= Pfalz =

Pfalz, Pfälzer, or Pfälzisch are German words referring to Palatinate.

They may refer to:

== Places ==
- Pfalz, the Palatinate (region) of Germany
  - Nordpfalz, the North Palatinate
  - Vorderpfalz, the Anterior Palatinate
  - Südpfalz, the South Palatinate
  - Westpfalz, the West Palatinate
- Pfalz, the Palatinate wine region of Germany
  - Pfälzische Weinkönigin, the Palatine Wine Queen elected representative of the region
- the Pfalz, nickname for Pfalzgrafenstein Castle, Germany. Also a general, regional term for a castle
- Pfälzerwald, the Palatinate Forest
- Rheinland-Pfalz, the current federal German state of Rhineland-Palatinate
- Königspfalz or Kaiserpfalz, palaces and castles across the Holy Roman Empire that served as temporary seats of power for the king or emperor in the Early and High Middle Ages.

== Historic states ==
- Kurpfalz, the Electoral Palatinate of the Holy Roman Empire. Historic houses and states include:
  - Pfalz-Birkenfeld, the House of Palatinate-Birkenfeld
  - Pfalz-Birkenfeld-Bischweiler
  - Pfalz-Birkenfeld-Gelnhausen
  - Pfalz-Birkenfeld-Zweibrücken
  - Pfalz-Kleeburg
  - Pfalz-Landsberg
  - Pfalz-Lautern
  - Pfalz-Mosbach
  - Pfalz-Mosbach-Neumarkt
  - Pfalz-Neuburg
  - Pfalz-Palatinate-Neumarkt, the House of Palatinate-Neumarkt
  - Pfalz-Simmern, the House of Palatinate-Simmern
  - Pfalz-Simmern-Zweibrücken
  - Pfalz-Simmern-Kaiserslautern
  - Pfalz-Simmern-Sponheim
  - Pfalz-Sulzbach
  - Pfalz-Sulzbach-Hilpoltstein
  - Pfalz-Zweibrücken
  - Pfalz-Zweibrücken-Birkenfeld
  - Pfalz-Zweibrücken-Vohenstrauss-Parkstein

== People ==
- Elisabeth-Charlotte Wittelsbach von Pfalz (1652-1722)
- Friedrich V von der Pfalz (1596-1632)
- Heinrich Friedrich von der Pfalz (1614-29)
- Karl I. Ludwig von der Pfalz (1617-80)
- Ludwig I von Pfalz-Zweibrücken (1424-89)
- Sophie von der Pfalz (1630-1714)
- Wolfgang Wilhelm von Pfalz-Neuburg (1578-1653)

== Transportation ==
=== Aircraft ===
- Pfalz Flugzeugwerke, a German World War I aircraft manufacturer
  - Pfalz D.III, 1917 biplane fighter
  - Pfalz D.VI, 1917 sesquiplane fighter aircraft not put into production
  - Pfalz D.VII, late 1917 biplane fighter not put into production
  - Pfalz D.VIII, 1918 biplane fighter
  - Pfalz D.XII, 1918 biplane fighter
  - Pfalz D.XV, 1918 single seat biplane fighter
  - Pfalz Dr.I, 1917 triplane fighter
  - Pfalz Dr.II, 1917 triplane fighter prototype

=== Rail ===
- Pfalz, a German steam locomotive preserved at the Neustadt/Weinstrasse Railway Museum
- Pfälzische Nordbahn, the Palatine Northern Railway
- Pfälzische Ludwigsbahn, historic name for the Mannheim–Saarbrücken railway
- Pfälzische Maximiliansbahn, historic name for the Neustadt–Wissembourg railway

=== Ships ===
- SS Pfalz, the name for three different steamships operated by German shipping company Norddeutscher Lloyd

== Other uses ==
- Pfälzisch, a dialect of the German language

== See also ==
- Falz (disambiguation)
- Pfaltz (disambiguation)
