= Palatinate =

Palatinate or county palatine may refer to:

- the territory or jurisdiction of a count palatine

== United Kingdom and Ireland ==
- County palatine in England and Ireland
- Palatinate (colour), a shade of purple used by the City of Durham and Durham University
- Palatinate (newspaper), student newspaper of Durham University

== Germany ==
- Electoral Palatinate (1085–1803), or County Palatine of the Rhine (1085–1803; German: Kurpfalz), a historical state of the Holy Roman Empire
- Rhineland-Palatinate (Rheinland-Pfalz), federal state in western Germany
  - Palatinate (region) (Pfalz, former Rheinpfalz), in Rhineland-Palatinate
  - The Bavarian Circle of the Rhine, a detached part of Bavaria from 1816 until 1946 which was renamed Palatinate (Pfalz) in 1837 (sometimes called the Rhenish Palatinate (Rheinpfalz)). Became part of Rhineland-Palatinate in 1946 and is the predecessor and namesake of the modern region.
  - Palatinate (wine region), in Rhineland-Palatinate
  - Palatinate Forest
- Palatinate of Saxony (Pfalzgrafschaft Sachsen), a historical palatinate in the Saale-Unstrut region
- Upper Palatinate (Oberpfalz), administrative region in Bavaria
- Several sub-branches of the Palatine branch of the House of Wittelsbach:
  - House of Palatinate-Birkenfeld, based in Birkenfeld
  - Palatinate-Birkenfeld-Bischweiler, based in Bischwiller
  - Palatinate-Birkenfeld-Gelnhausen, based in Gelnhausen
  - Palatinate-Birkenfeld-Zweibrücken, based in Zweibrücken
  - Palatinate-Kleeburg, based in Kleeburg
  - Palatinate-Landsberg, based at Landsberg Castle in Heiligenstein
  - Palatinate-Lautern, based in Kaiserslautern and Neustadt an der Weinstrasse
  - Palatinate-Mosbach, based in Mosbach
  - Palatinate-Mosbach-Neumarkt, based in Mosbach
  - Palatinate-Neuburg, based in Neuburg an der Donau
  - House of Palatinate-Neumarkt, based in Neumarkt in der Oberpfalz
  - House of Palatinate-Simmern, based in Simmern
  - Palatinate-Simmern and Zweibrücken, based in Zweibrücken
  - Palatinate-Simmern-Kaiserslautern, based in Simmern
  - Palatinate-Simmern-Sponheim, based in Simmern
  - Palatinate-Sulzbach, based in Sulzbach
  - Palatinate-Sulzbach-Hilpoltstein, based in Hilpoltstein
  - Palatine Zweibrücken, based in Zweibrücken
  - Palatinate-Zweibrücken-Birkenfeld, based in Birkenfeld
  - Palatinate-Zweibrücken-Vohenstrauss-Parkstein, based in Vohenstrauss

== Greece ==
- County Palatine of Cephalonia and Zakynthos

== Hungary ==
- Palatine of Hungary
- List of palatines of Hungary

== Poland ==
- Voivodeships of Poland

== Ukraine ==
- Subdivisions of Zaporozhian Sich and Polish–Lithuanian Commonwealth (also known as voivodeships)

== See also ==
- Palatine (disambiguation)
- Pfalz (disambiguation)
- Pfaltz (disambiguation)
