= Mosbach =

- Town
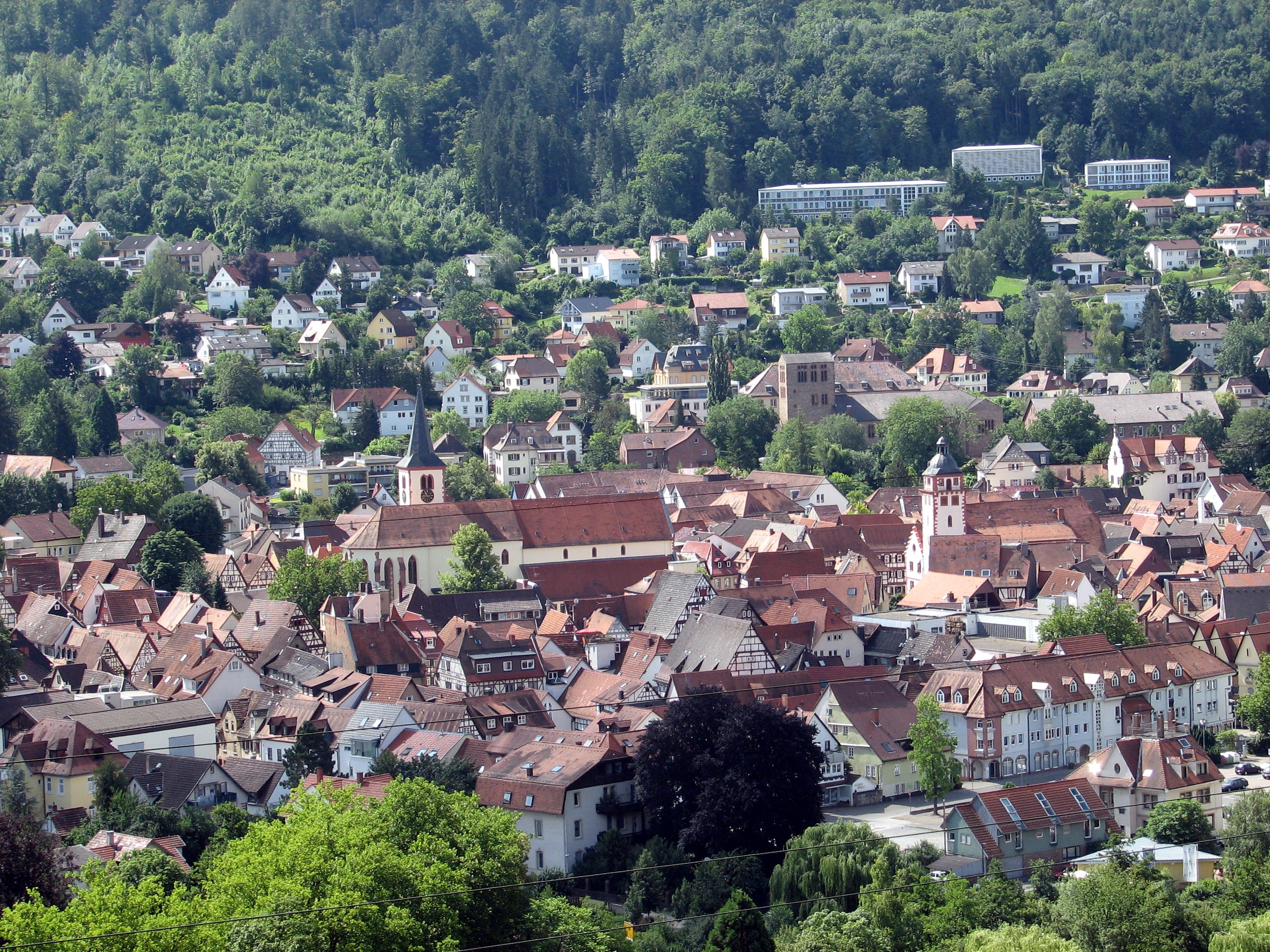

- Coat of arms

- Location of Mosbach within Neckar-Odenwald-Kreis district
- Interactive map of Mosbach
- Location within Germany Location within Baden-Württemberg
- Coordinates: 49°21′8″N 9°8′48″E
- Country: Germany
- State: Baden-Württemberg
- Admin. region: Karlsruhe
- District: Neckar-Odenwald-Kreis
- Subdivisions: 6

Government
  - Mayor (2022–30): Julian Stipp

Area
  - Total: 62.16 km^{2} (24.00 sq mi)
- Elevation: 156 m (512 ft)

Population (2025-12-31)
  - Total: 24,393
  - Density: 392.4/km^{2} (1,016/sq mi)
- Time zone: UTC+01:00 (CET)
  - Summer (DST): UTC+02:00 (CEST)
- Postal codes: 74821
- Dialling codes: 06261, 06263 (Reichenbuch), 06267 (Sattelbach)
- Vehicle registration: MOS, BCH
- Website: www.mosbach.de

Mosbach (German pronunciation: [ˈmoːsbax]; South Franconian: Mossbach) is a town in the north of Baden-Württemberg, Germany. It is the seat of the Neckar-Odenwald district and has a population of approximately 25,000 distributed in six boroughs: Mosbach Town, Lohrbach, Neckarelz, Diedesheim, Sattelbach and Reichenbuch.

== Geography ==
Mosbach is located about 35 km east of Heidelberg, south of the Odenwald mountains at a height of 134-354m at the confluence of the Neckar and the Elz. The town is part of the conservation area Neckartal-Odenwald Nature Park and the UNESCO Bergstrasse-Odenwald Nature Park.

Climate data for Mosbach (precipitation normals 1991-2020)
Month	Jan	Feb	Mar	Apr	May	Jun	Jul	Aug	Sep	Oct	Nov	Dec	Year
Average precipitation mm	90.0	76.6	77.2	51.1	81.0	71.1	81.6	71.1	67.1	79.8	82.6	109.6	938.8
Average precipitation inches	3.54	3.02	3.04	2.01	3.19	2.80	3.21	2.80	2.64	3.14	3.25	4.31	36.95
Source: Deutscher Wetterdienst

== History ==
The settlement of Mosbach developed around the Benedictine monastery of Mosbach Abbey ("Monasterium Mosabach"), the first written record of which dates from the 9th century. In 1241 rights and privileges had been granted to Mosbach as an Imperial free city. These rights were lost in 1362 when Mosbach became part of the Electorate of the Palatinate. With the division of the lands of King Rupert in 1410, Mosbach became the capital of a small principality known as Palatinate-Mosbach as the inheritance for his son Otto I. With the death of his brother John, Count Palatine of Neumarkt 1443, the territory of Palatinate-Neumarkt was added in a personal union to Palatinate-Mosbach creating the territory of Palatinate-Mosbach-Neumarkt. This principality was dissolved with the death of Count Palatine Otto II in 1499. The city and adjoining territory reverted to the Electorate of the Palatinate, and Mosbach became the capital of the administrative district of "Oberamt Mosbach". In 1806 the city was made part of the Grand Duchy of Baden. In World War II, the Mosbach area was the location of a Daimler-Benz underground airplane engine factory, codenamed "Goldfisch". It was occupied by the 289th Combat Engineer Battalion in the immediate postwar period.

== Twin towns and sister cities ==
Mosbach is twinned with:

- Budapest II, Hungary
- Château-Thierry, France
- Finike, Turkey
- Lymington, England, United Kingdom
- Rosolina, Italy

== Points of interest ==
Historic sites include:

- the historic town centre with the pedestrian area and timber-framed houses, such as:
  - the Palm House built in 1610, which is the town's emblem
  - the Salzhaus, which is the oldest timber-framed house
- old town hall with tower
- the former collegiate church, now a parish church, of which the nave is used by the Protestants, and the chancel by the Roman Catholics
- the Tempelhaus in Neckarelz, which has the character of both a castle and a church.

Mosbach lies on two heritage routes:

- the Burgenstraße (“Castle Road”), linking many historic castles
- the Deutsche Fachwerkstraße (“German Half-timbered Road”), joining the locations of many of the best German half-timbered buildings
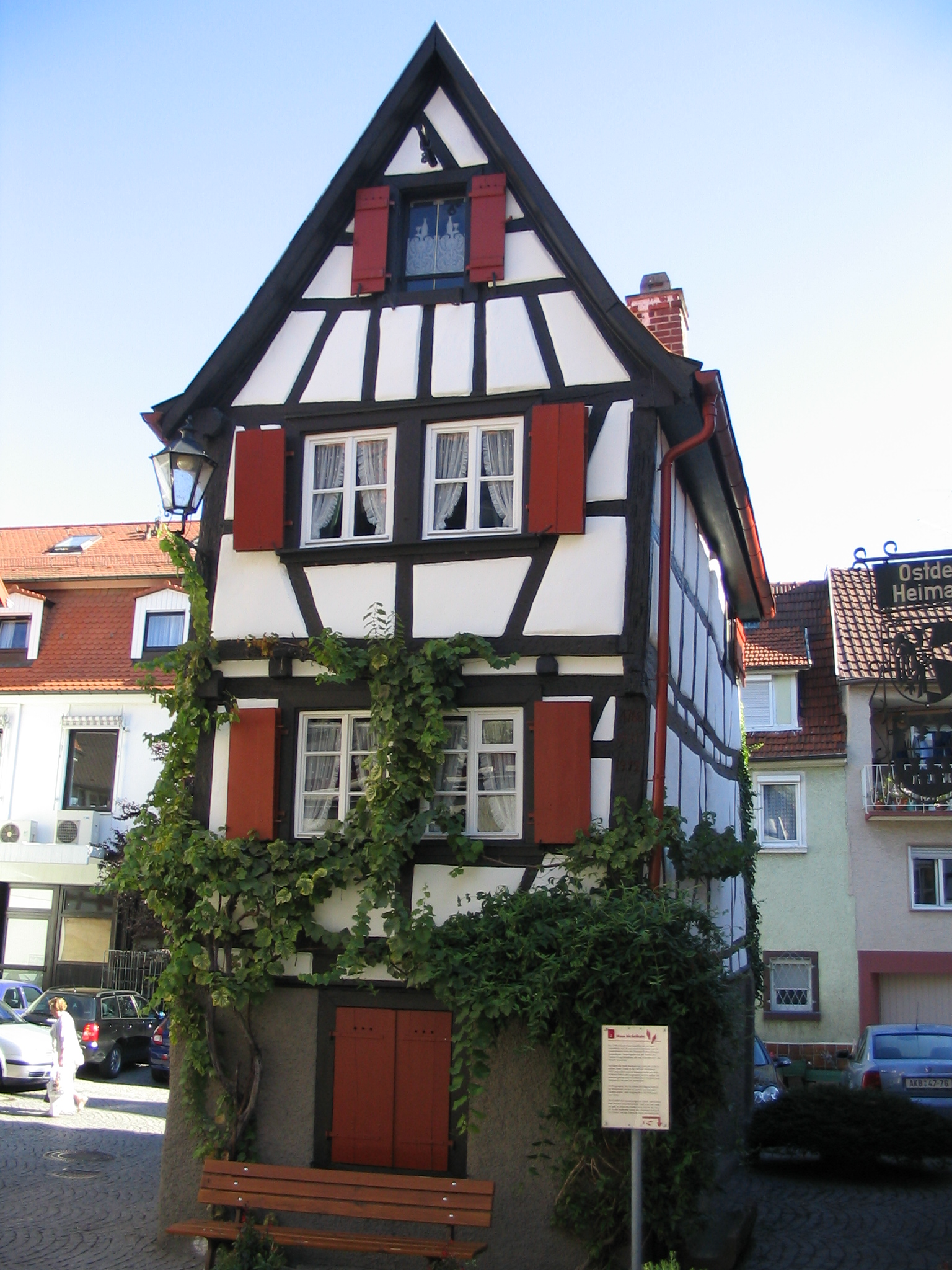
Kickelhain House

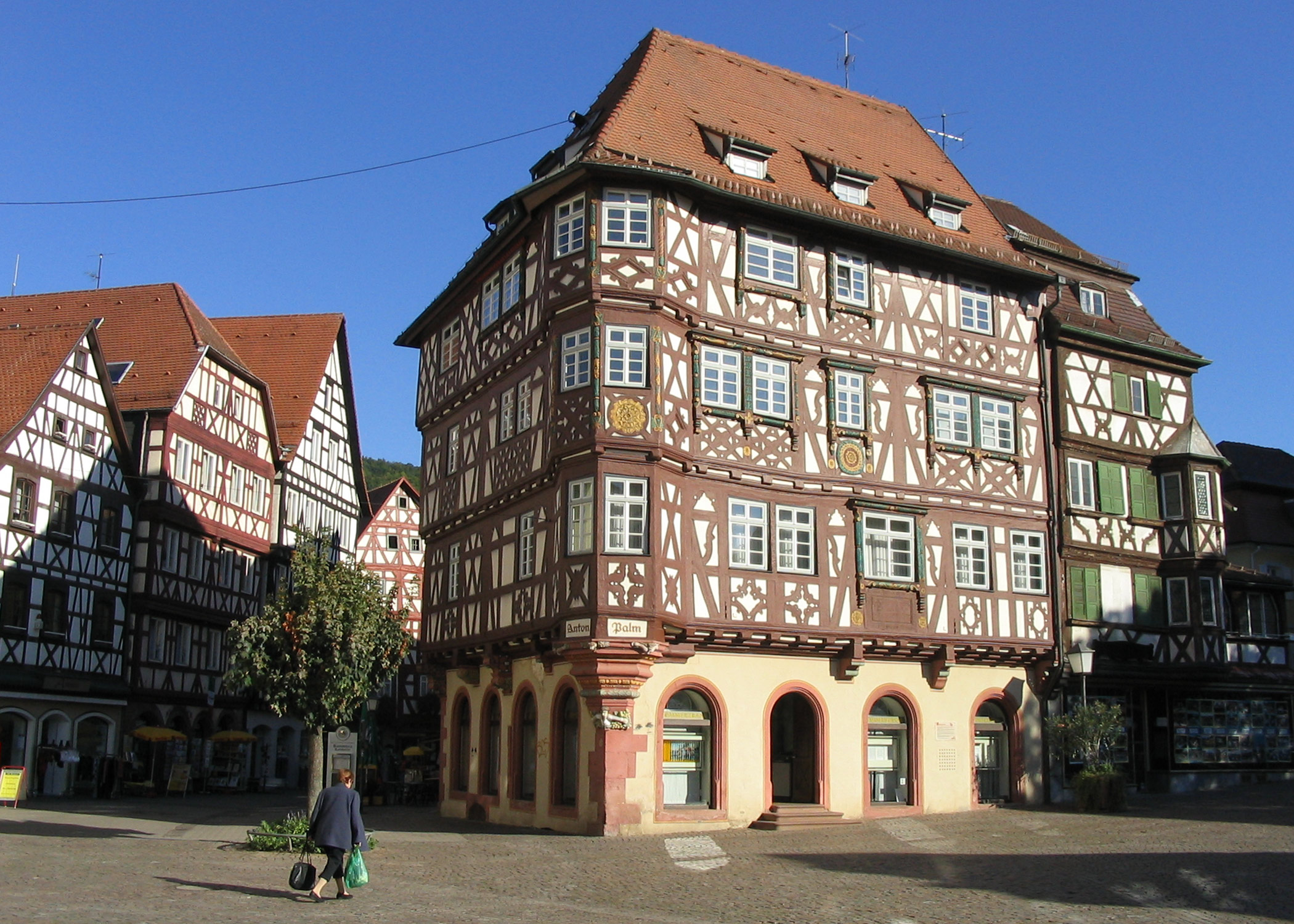
The “Palmsche Haus” at the market place

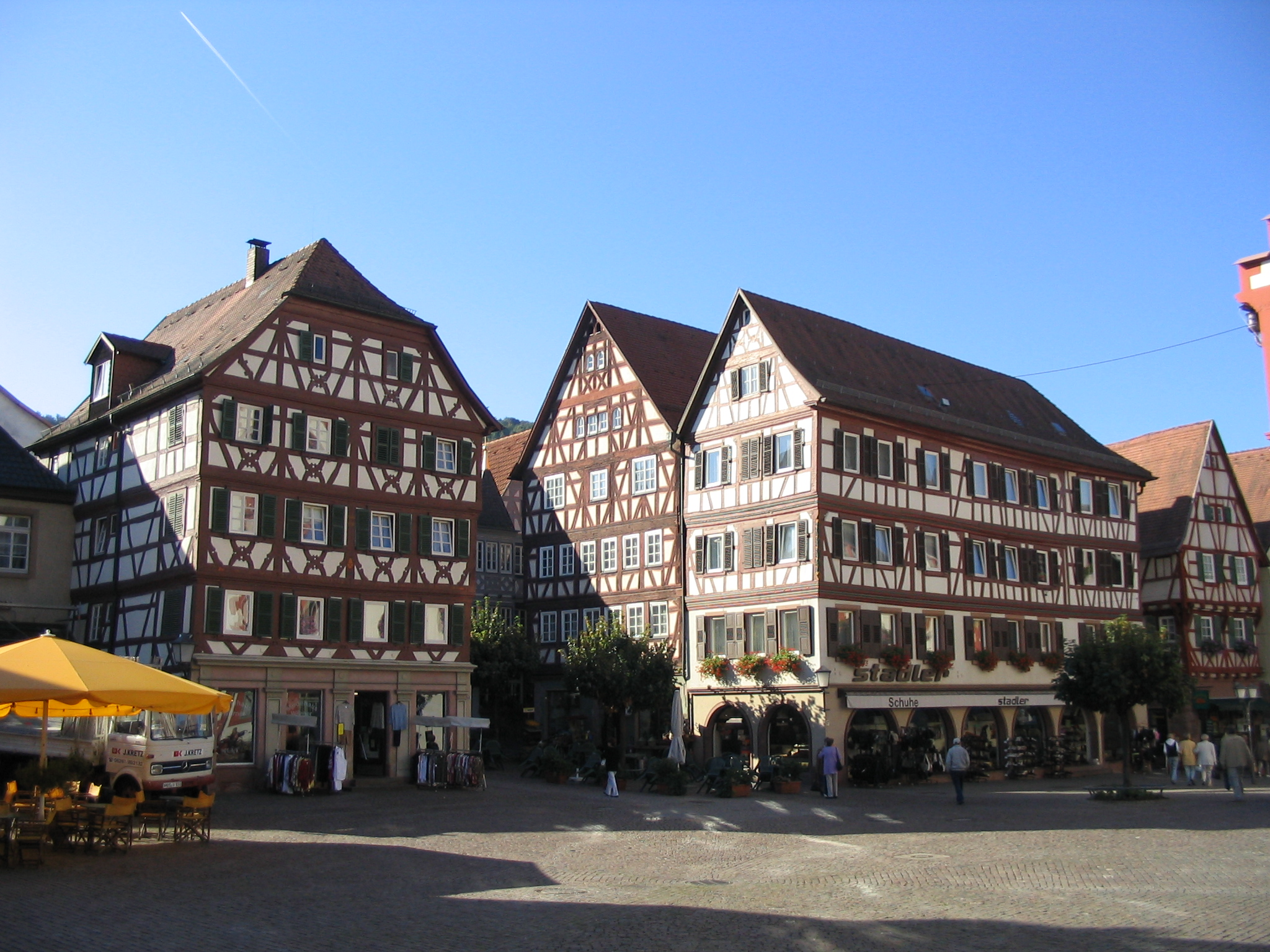
Market place, opposite side to the “Palmsche Haus”

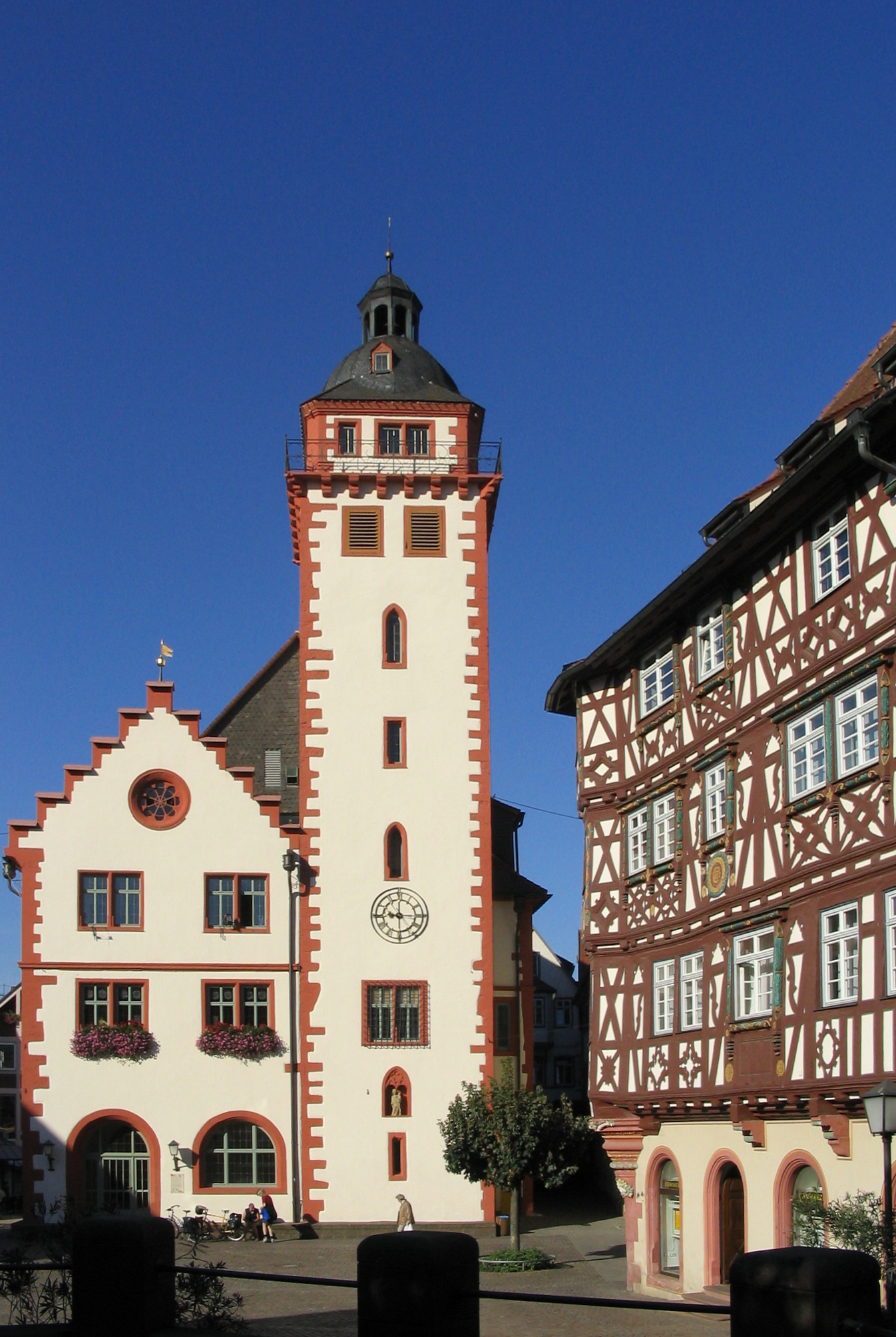
Town hall

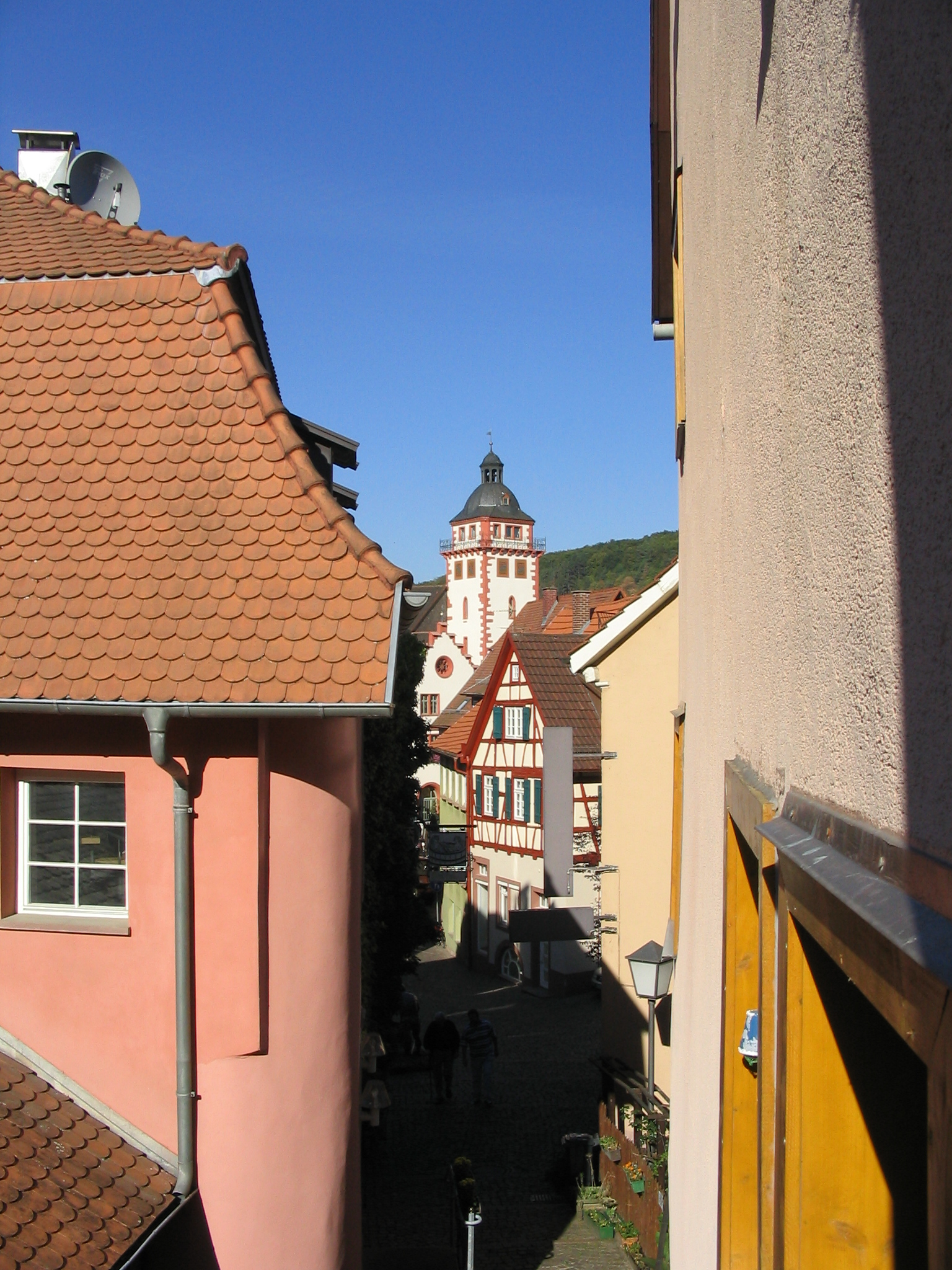
A picturesque corner

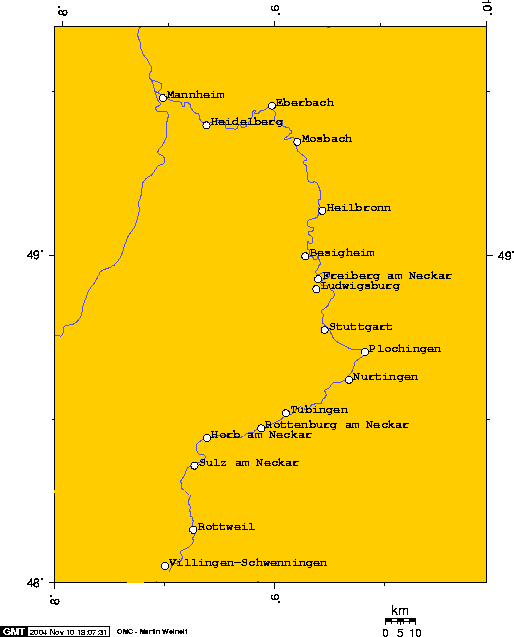
Mosbach and the other cities on the Neckar River

== Notable people born in Mosbach ==
- TM Garret, German-American human-rights activist
- Franz Müller, German film director, screenwriter and producer

== See also ==
- Schloss Mosbach
