= Otto of Bavaria =

Otto of Bavaria may refer to:

- Otto I, Duke of Swabia and Bavaria (955–982)
- Otto of Nordheim (c. 1020–1083)
- Otto I Wittelsbach, Duke of Bavaria (1117–1183)
- Otto VIII, Count Palatine of Bavaria (before 1180 – 7 March 1209)
- Otto II Wittelsbach, Duke of Bavaria (1206–1253)
- Otto III, Duke of Bavaria (1261–1312)
- Otto IV, Duke of Lower Bavaria (1307–1334)
- Otto V, Duke of Bavaria (1346–1379)
- Otto Henry, Count Palatine of Sulzbach (1556–1604)
- Otto Henry, Elector Palatine (1502–1559)
- Otto I, Count Palatine of Mosbach (1390–1461)
- Otto II, Count Palatine of Mosbach-Neumarkt (1435–1499)
- Charles II Otto, Count Palatine of Zweibrücken-Birkenfeld (1625–1671)
- Otto of Greece (1815–1867)
- Otto, King of Bavaria (1848–1916)
