= John Charles, Count Palatine of Gelnhausen =

German prince (1638-1704)

John Charles, Count Palatine of Birkenfeld at Gelnhausen
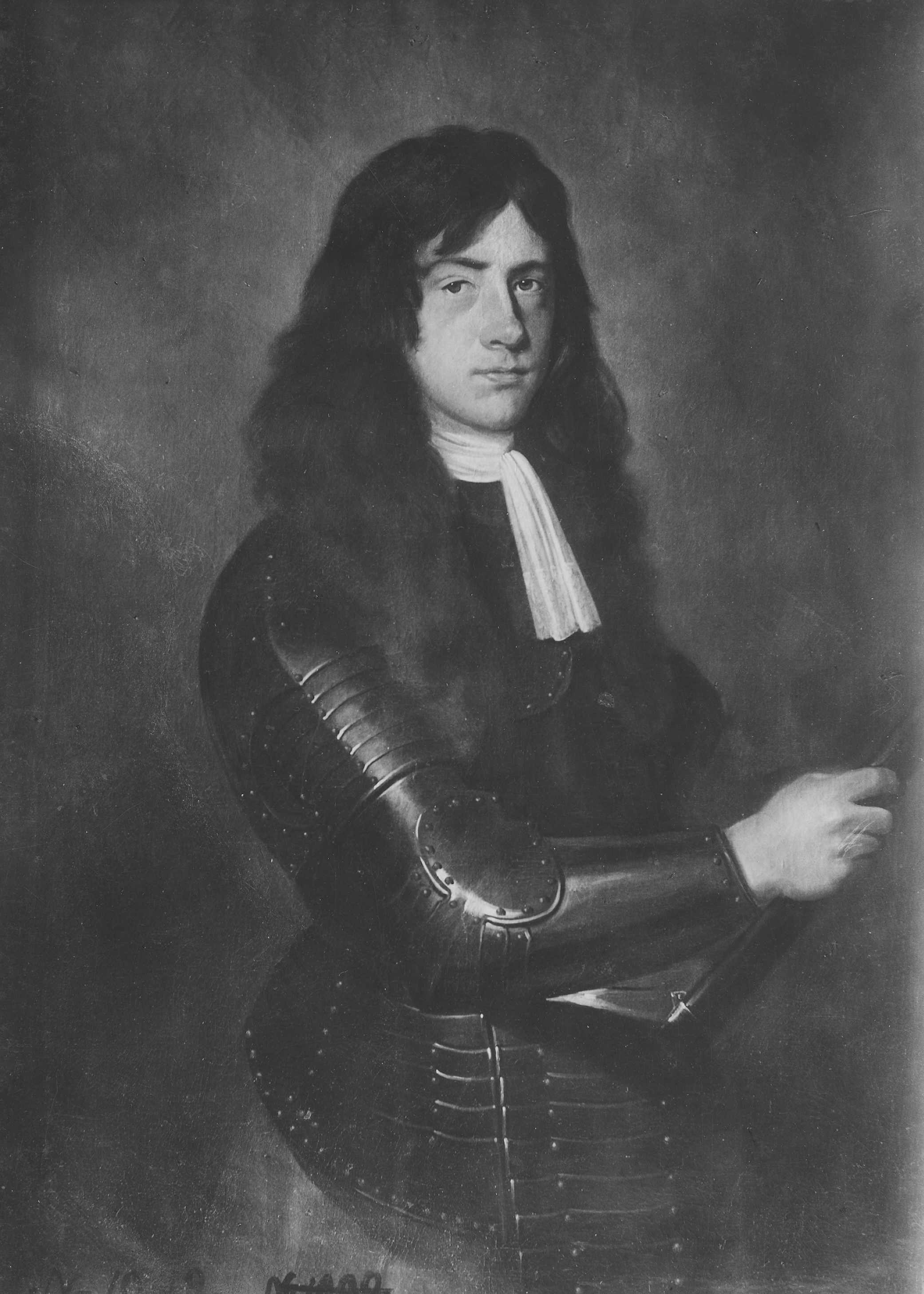
- Born: 17 October 1638; Bischweiler
- Died: 21 February 1704 (aged 65); Gelnhausen
- Noble family: House of Wittelsbach
- Spouses: Countess Palatine Sophie Amalie of Zweibrücken; Esther Maria von Witzleben
- Issue: Frederick Bernard; Johan; Wilhelm
- Father: Christian I, Count Palatine of Birkenfeld-Bischweiler
- Mother: Magdalene Catherine, Countess Palatine of Zweibrücken

John Charles, Count Palatine of Birkenfeld at Gelnhausen (17 October 1638 – 21 February 1704), was a German prince and ancestor of the cadet branch of the royal family of Bavaria known, from the early 19th century, as Dukes in Bavaria. He took Gelnhausen as the name of his branch of the family after acquiring that estate in 1669.

== Early life ==
John Charles was the younger of two sons of Christian I, Count Palatine of Zweibrücken-Birkenfeld-Bischweiler and his wife, Magdalene Catherine, Countess Palatine of Zweibrücken, daughter of Count Palatine John II of Zweibrücken.

== Education and career ==
Together with his older brother Christian II of Birkenfeld, he was educated by Philip Jacob Spener and later studied at the University of Strasbourg. Thereafter, the brothers took a grand tour lasting five years, which took them to, among other places, France, Holland, England, Sweden and Switzerland.

He participated as a cavalry commander in the army of a Palatine cousin who in 1654 had become king of Sweden as Charles X and waged war against Denmark. Later he fought against the Turks in Hungary. He then entered Dutch service. He participated in 1674 in the battle of Seneffe and was promoted to the rank of First Army Leader. He then left the military and retired to Gelnhausen.

== Founder of Gelnhausen branch ==
In 1669 John Charles bought the Fürstenhof ("Princely court") of Gelnhausen, which included the Residenz, gardens and parcels of land that had first been granted by the Holy Roman Emperor to an earlier Wittelsbach, the Elector Palatine Louis III in 1435. In 1671 John Charles and his brother jointly inherited the county palatine of Birkenfeld.

In 1673 they agreed that although Christian would keep Birkenfeld as well as another inheritance, Bischweiler, John Charles would receive the Neuburg appanage, a civil list of 6,000 florins constituting one-third of the revenues from yet another family estate, the county-palatine of Neuburg – plus annual delivery of four cart-loads of Moselle wine from the cellars of Trarbach. In compacts with his brother Christian II signed in 1681 and 1683, John Charles was deputised with the administration of Gelnhausen.

== First marriage ==
John Charles married his first wife, Princess Sophie Amalie of Zweibrücken, in 1685 in Weikersheim. She was a daughter of Prince Frederick, Count Palatine of Zweibrücken and Countess Anna Juliane von Nassau-Saarbrücken, the widow of Count Siegfried of Hohenlohe-Weikersheim.

== Second marriage ==
Although Sophie Amalie died 30 November 1695 without having borne him a male heir, John Charles wrote Christian on 25 July 1696 declaring that if, feeling unable to continue living alone and heeding his heart's desire, he were to remarry it would only be a marriage of affection, since he was in no position to maintain a lady of rank. Three days later, he wed his late wife's lady-in-waiting, Esther Maria von Witzleben-Elgersburg, the 30-year-old widow of Johann Friedrich von Brömbsen. Although her family belonged to the ancient Thuringian nobility they lacked the status of Imperial immediacy enjoyed by the Counts Palatine. Esther Maria was daughter of Georg Friedrich von Witzleben-Elgersburg, Chief ranger (Oberförstmeister) at the court of the Duchy of Saxe-Römhild and his wife, Maria Magdalena von Hanstein, whose grandmother Sibylla was also a member of Witzleben family. Within weeks John Charles found himself trying to conciliate his disapproving brother, disclosing the marriage but assuring him that it was a strictly private arrangement, and that should any children be born thereof he "would claim no more for them than to be taken as nobles, so that there is nothing to fear with regard to the succession." By August Johann Carl had entered into an agreement (Vertrag) to this effect with his older brother, but later changed his mind. He petitioned the Emperor to make his wife an Imperial countess, while Christian II refused to recognise the children born to his brother's marriage subsequently (three sons and two daughters) as agnates of the dynasty.

== Dynasts ==
John Charles died in 1704 and his widow filed a lawsuit against his brother in the Aulic Council of the Empire on 3 September 1708. She obtained, on 11 April 1715, full recognition for herself and her children as princely dynasts. Her brother-in-law Christian II acquiesced in an agreement of 29 October 1716, recognising her children's Palatine titles and succession rights, and increasing their allowance from 6,000 to 50,000 gulden. Nonetheless, other branches of the House of Wittelsbach continued to treat John Charles's children as morganatic, declining to acknowledge their eligibility to inherit the dynasty's patrimonies. In the Wittelsbach family compact of 1771 establishing reciprocal inheritance rights between the Palatine and Bavarian branches, heirs to their realms were restricted to agnates who were legitimate and "not born of unequal marriage" (nicht ex dispari matrimonio). However the Peace of Teschen which concluded the War of the Bavarian Succession in 1779 finally recognised, in Article 8, the dynastic rights of the descendants of John Charles and Esther Marie von Witzleben, whose grandson, Wilhelm, received in 1803 the Duchy of Berg as an appanage from the Elector of Bavaria in compensation for the cession of his territories on the left bank of the Rhine to Napoleon.

Berg was summarily re-allocated to Napoleon's brother-in-law, Joachim Murat, by Bavaria in 1806 in exchange for the Margraviate of Ansbach, but the title of Duke in Bavaria, granted by the Holy Roman Emperor to Count Palatine Wilhelm on 16 February 1799 continued to be borne by their direct descendants and recognised until abolition of the German Empire in 1918, and remains in use by their adopted descendants in the 21st century.

== Issue ==
John Charles and Sophie Amalie of Zweibrücken had one daughter:

- Juliane Magdalene (1686–1720)

married in 1704 Duke Joachim Frederick, Duke of Schleswig-Holstein-Sonderburg-Plön (1668-1722)

John Charles and Esther Maria von Witzleben had five children:

- Frederick Bernard (1697–1739)

married in 1737 Princess Ernestine Louise of Waldeck (1705-1782)

- Johan (1698–1780)

married Wild- and Rhinegravine Sophie Charlotte of Salm-Dhaun (1719-1770)

- Wilhelm (1701–1760), field marshal in the Hungarian army and later general of the cavalry in the Dutch army
- Charlotte Catherine (1699–1785)

married in 1745 Prince Frederick William, Prince of Solms-Braunfels (1696-1761)

- Sophie Marie (1702–1761)

married in 1722 Count Heinrich XXV Reuss von Schleiz zu Köstritz (1681-1748)

== Ancestry ==
Ancestors of John Charles, Count Palatine of Gelnhausen

16. Louis II, Count Palatine of Zweibrücken
8. Wolfgang, Count Palatine of Zweibrücken
17. Landgravine Elisabeth of Hesse
4. Charles I, Count Palatine of Zweibrücken-Birkenfeld
18. Philip I, Landgrave of Hesse
9. Landgravine Anna of Hesse
19. Duchess Christine of Saxony
2. Christian I, Count Palatine of Birkenfeld-Bischweiler
20. Ernest I, Duke of Brunswick-Lüneburg
10. William, Duke of Brunswick-Lüneburg
21. Duchess Sophia of Mecklenburg
5. Duchess Dorothea of Brunswick-Lüneburg
22. Christian III of Denmark
11. Princess Dorothea of Denmark
23. Dorothea of Saxe-Lauenburg
1. John Charles, Count Palatine of Gelnhausen
24. Wolfgang, Count Palatine of Zweibrücken (= 8)
12. John I, Count Palatine of Zweibrücken
25. Landgravine Anna of Hesse (= 9)
6. John II, Count Palatine of Zweibrücken
26. William, Duke of Jülich-Cleves-Berg
13. Duchess Magdalene of Jülich-Cleves-Berg
27. Archduchess Maria of Austria
3. Countess Palatine Magdalene Catherine of Zweibrücken
28. René I, Viscount of Rohan
14. René II, Viscount of Rohan
29. Infanta Isabella of Navarre
7. Catherine de Rohan
30. Jean V de Parthenay
15. Catherine de Parthenay
31. Antoinette d'Aubeterre

== Titulature ==
As a member of the House of Wittelsbach, he held the titles of Count Palatine of the Rhine, Duke in Bavaria, Count of Veldenz, Sponheim, Rappoltstein and Hohenack. As head of his own cadet branch of the dynasty, he was known as the Count Palatine of Birkenfeld at Gelnhausen. All of his dynastic male-line descendants have borne since 1799, as their primary title, "Duke or Duchess in Bavaria", embellished since 1845 with the style of Royal Highness.

== Bibliography ==
- Nathanael von Schlichtegroll: Genealogische lebens-skizzen der vorfahren des bayerischen königs-hauses bis auf Otto den Grossen von Wittelsbach, J. Rösl, 1842, p. 57
- Johann Samuel Ersch: Allgemeine Encyklopädie der Wissenschaften und Künste: in alphabetischer Folge, Section 2: H - N, vol. 21, Johann (Infant von Castilien) - Johann-Boniten, part 2, vol. 21, Gleditsch, 1842, p. 189
- Maximilian V. Sattler: Lehrbuch der bayerischen Geschichte, Lindauer, 1868, p. 412 Online

== References and notes ==
John Charles, Count Palatine of Gelnhausen House of Wittelsbach Born: 17 October 1638 Died: 21 February 1704
Preceded by Christian I as Count Palatine of Birkenfeld-Bischweiler	Count Palatine of Gelnhausen; 1654-1704	Succeeded by Frederick Bernard
