= Count Palatine William of Gelnhausen =

- Born: 4 January 1701; Gelnhausen
- Died: 25 December 1760 (aged 59); The Hague
- Noble family: House of Wittelsbach
- Father: John Charles, Count Palatine of Gelnhausen
- Mother: Esther Maria of Witzleben-Elgersburg

Count Palatine William of Birkenfeld-Gelnhausen (4 January 1701 in Gelnhausen – 25 December 1760 in The Hague) was a titular Count Palatine of Zweibrücken-Birkenfeld and an Imperial Field Marshal.

== Life ==
William was the youngest son of the Count Palatine John Charles of Gelnhausen (1638–1704) from his second marriage, Esther Maria (1665–1725), a daughter of George Frederick, Baron Witzleben of Elgersburg.

William served from 1729 in the Austrian army and was wounded during the Battle of Mollwitz. In 1742, he won a victory against the French general Bouffleur and drove the French from Tein. In 1743, he became General of the Cavalry in the Dutch army. In 1754, he accompanied Emperor Francis I to his coronation in Frankfurt. In the same year, he became imperial field marshal. In 1757 he was appointed governor of Namur.
