= John, Count Palatine of Gelnhausen =

Count Palatine of Gelnhausen (1739-1780)

John
- Count Palatine of Gelnhausen
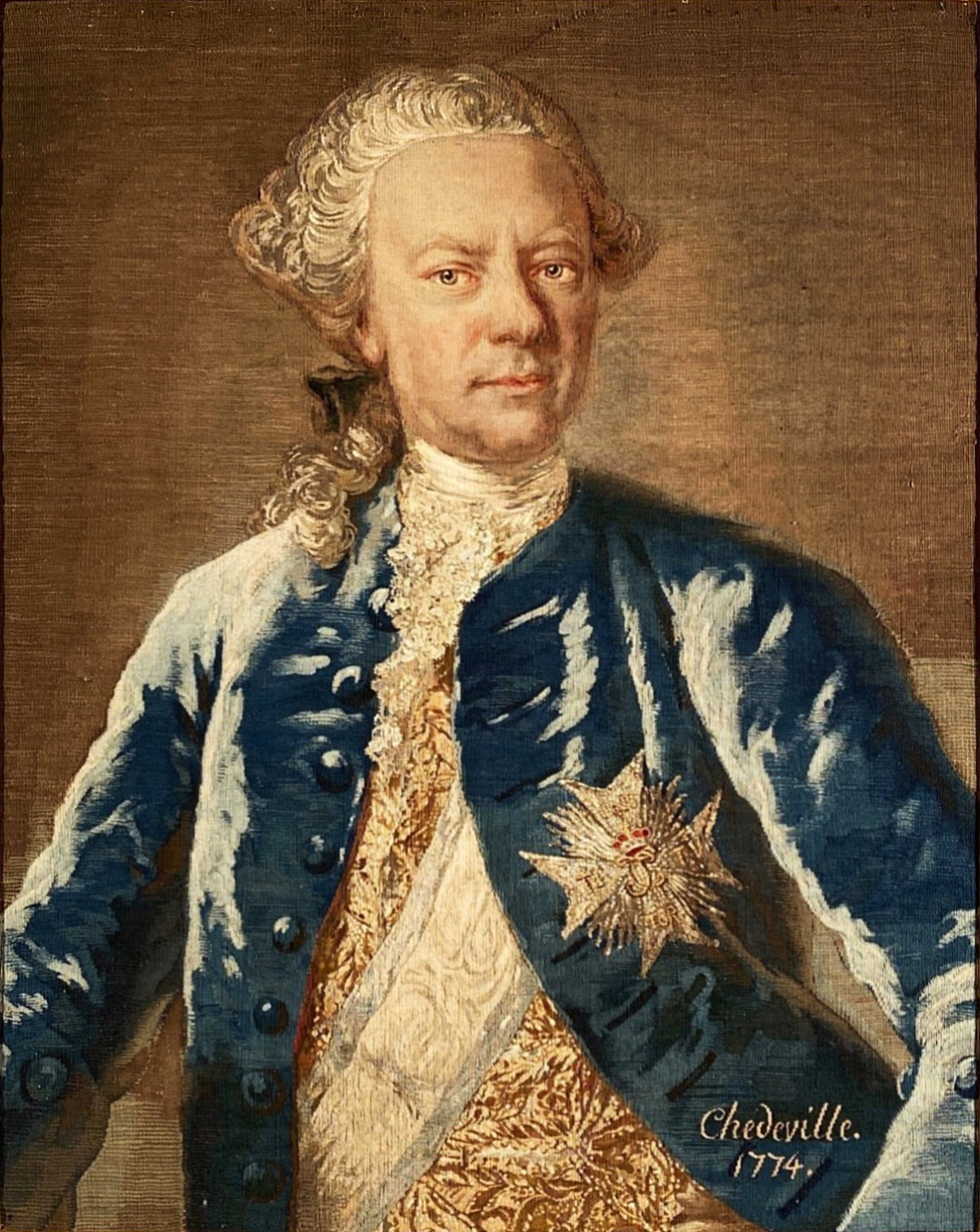
- Born: 24 May 1698; Gelnhausen
- Died: 10 February 1780 (aged 81); Mannheim
- Noble family: House of Wittelsbach
- Spouse: Sophie Charlotte of Salm-Dhaun
- Issue: William
- Father: John Charles, Count Palatine of Gelnhausen
- Mother: Esther Maria of Witzleben-Elgersburg

John, Count Palatine of Gelnhausen (24 May 1698 in Gelnhausen – 10 February 1780 in Mannheim) was Count Palatine and Duke of Zweibrücken-Birkenfeld at Gelnhausen.

== Life ==
John was the younger son of the Duke and Count Palatine John Charles of Birkenfeld-Gelnhausen (1638-1704) from his second marriage with Esther Maria (1665–1725), a daughter of Baron George Frederick of Witzleben-Elgersburg.

He was a Feldzeugmeister in the army of the Electoral Palatinate and commander of all troops and knights of the Palatinate Order of St. Hubert. John was also a governor of Palatine Duchy of Jülich and commander of the fortress of Jülich. He mainly lived in Mannheim. After the death of his brother Frederick Bernard in 1739, he succeeded as Count Palatine of Birkenfeld-Gelnhausen.

== Marriage and issue ==
Johann married Sophie Charlotte (1719–1770), daughter of the Wild- and Rhinegrave Charles of Salm-Dhaun, in 1743 in Dhaun. Sophie Charlotte was the granddaughter of two of Johann's first cousins, making the couple first cousins twice removed in descent from Christian I, Count Palatine of Birkenfeld-Bischweiler. They had eight children:

- Charles John Louis (1745–1789)
- Louise (1748–1829) married Count Henry XXX of Reuss-Gera (1727–1802)
- Johanna Sophie (1751–1752)
- William (1752–1837), Duke in Bavaria; married in 1780 Countess Palatine Maria Anna of Zweibrücken-Birkenfeld (1753–1824)
- Friederike (1753–1753)
- Sophia (1757–1760)
- Christian (1760–1761)
- John (1766–1768)

== Ancestors ==
Ancestors of John, Count Palatine of Gelnhausen

16. Wolfgang, Count Palatine of Zweibrücken
8. Charles I, Count Palatine of Zweibrücken-Birkenfeld
17. Anna of Hesse
4. Christian I, Count Palatine of Birkenfeld-Bischweiler
18. William, Duke of Brunswick-Lüneburg
9. Dorothea of Brunswick-Lüneburg
19. Dorothea of Denmark
2. John Charles, Count Palatine of Gelnhausen
20. John I, Count Palatine of Zweibrücken
10. John II, Count Palatine of Zweibrücken
21. Magdalene of Jülich-Cleves-Berg
5. Countess Palatine Magdalena Katharina of Zweibrücken
22. René II, Viscount of Rohan
11. Catherine de Rohan
23. Catherine of Parthenay
1. John, Count Palatine of Gelnhausen
24. Job William of Witzleben
12. Eric Frederick of Witzleben
25. Maria Magdalena of Wangenheim
6. George Frederick of Witzleben-Elgersburg
26. George Frederick of Erffa
13. Anna Agnes of Erffa
27. Sabina of Dohlau
3. Esther Maria of Witzleben-Elgersburg
28. Caspar of Hantein
14. Rudolf of Hanstein
29. Sibylla of Hoheneck
7. Maria Magdalena of Hanstein
30. Bernard of Bibra
15. Maria Sibylla of Bibra
31. Sibylla of Witzleben

John, Count Palatine of Gelnhausen House of Wittelsbach Born: 24 May 1698 Died: 10 February 1780
Preceded by Frederick Bernard	Count Palatine of Gelnhausen; 1739-1780	Succeeded by Charles John Louis
