= Frederick Bernard, Count Palatine of Gelnhausen =

- Born: 28 May 1697; Gelnhausen
- Died: 5 August 1739 (aged 42); Gelnhausen
- Noble family: House of Wittelsbach
- Spouse: Ernestine Louise of Waldeck-Pyrmont
- Father: John Charles, Count Palatine of Gelnhausen
- Mother: Esther Maria of Witzleben-Elgersburg

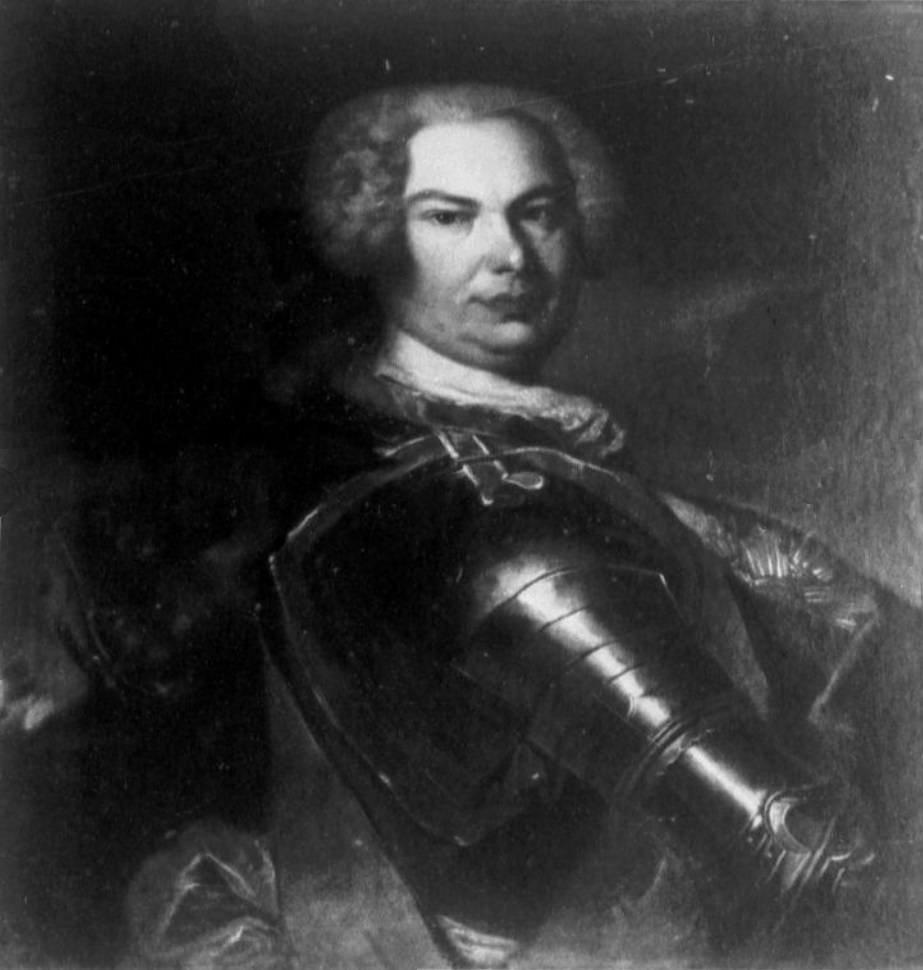
Portrait of Frederick Bernard, Count Palatine of Gelnhausen (1697-1739)

Frederick Bernard, Count Palatine of Gelnhausen (28 May 1697 in Gelnhausen – 5 August 1739, ibid.) was Count Palatine and Duke of Birkenfeld-Gelnhausen.

== Life ==
Frederick Bernard was the eldest son of the Duke and Count Palatine John Charles of Gelnhausen (1638-1704) from his second marriage to Esther Maria (1665-1725), the daughter of Baron George Frederick of Witzleben-Elgersburg.

In 1704, he succeeded his father as Count Palatine of Birkenfeld-Gelnhausen. He served in the French army as a colonel of the Royal Alsatian regiment. He was a knight of the Order of Saint Hubert. A treaty of 1736 with Caroline, the regent of Zweibrücken, granted Frederick Bernard an annual allowance of 12000guilders.

Frederick Bernard died in 1739 without a male heir. Gelnhause was inherited by his younger brother John.

== Marriage and issue ==
Frederick Bernard married on 30 May 1737 in Arolsen to Princess Ernestine Louise of Waldeck-Pyrmont (1705-1782), the daughter of Friedrich Anton Ulrich, Prince of Waldeck and Pyrmont. Her mother was Frederick Bernard's cousin, Countess palatine Louise of Palatinate-Birkenfeld-Bischweiler. Frederick Bernard and Ernestine Louise had two daughters:

- Caroline Louise (1738-1782)
- Ernestine Friederike Auguste (1739-1746)

== Ancestors ==
Ancestors of Frederick Bernard, Count Palatine of Gelnhausen

16. Wolfgang, Count Palatine of Zweibrücken
8. Charles I, Count Palatine of Zweibrücken-Birkenfeld
17. Anna of Hesse
4. Christian I, Count Palatine of Birkenfeld-Bischweiler
18. William, Duke of Brunswick-Lüneburg
9. Dorothea of Brunswick-Lüneburg
19. Dorothea of Denmark
2. John Charles, Count Palatine of Gelnhausen
20. John I, Count Palatine of Zweibrücken
10. John II, Count Palatine of Zweibrücken
21. Magdalene of Jülich-Cleves-Berg
5. Countess Palatine Magdalene Catherine of Zweibrücken
22. René II, Viscount of Rohan
11. Catherine of Rohan
23. Catherine of Parthenay
1. Frederick Bernard, Count Palatine of Gelnhausen
24. Job William of Witzleben
12. Eric Frederick of Witzleben
25. Maria Magdalena of Wangenheim
6. George Frederick of Witzleben-Elgersburg
26. George Frederick of Erffa
13. Anna Agnes of Erffa
27. Sabina of Dohlau
3. Esther Maria of Witzleben-Elgersburg
28. Caspar of Hantein
14. Rudolf of Hanstein
29. Sibylla of Hoheneck
7. Maria Magdalena of Hanstein
30. Bernard of Bibra
15. Maria Sibylla of Bibra
31. Sibylla of Witzleben

== Footnotes ==
Frederick Bernard, Count Palatine of Gelnhausen House of Wittelsbach Born: 28 May 1697 Died: 5 August 1739
Preceded by John Charles	Count Palatine of Gelnhausen; 1704-1739	Succeeded by John
