= Schloss Mosbach =

Castle in Germany

Coordinates: 49.3508496°N 9.145065°E

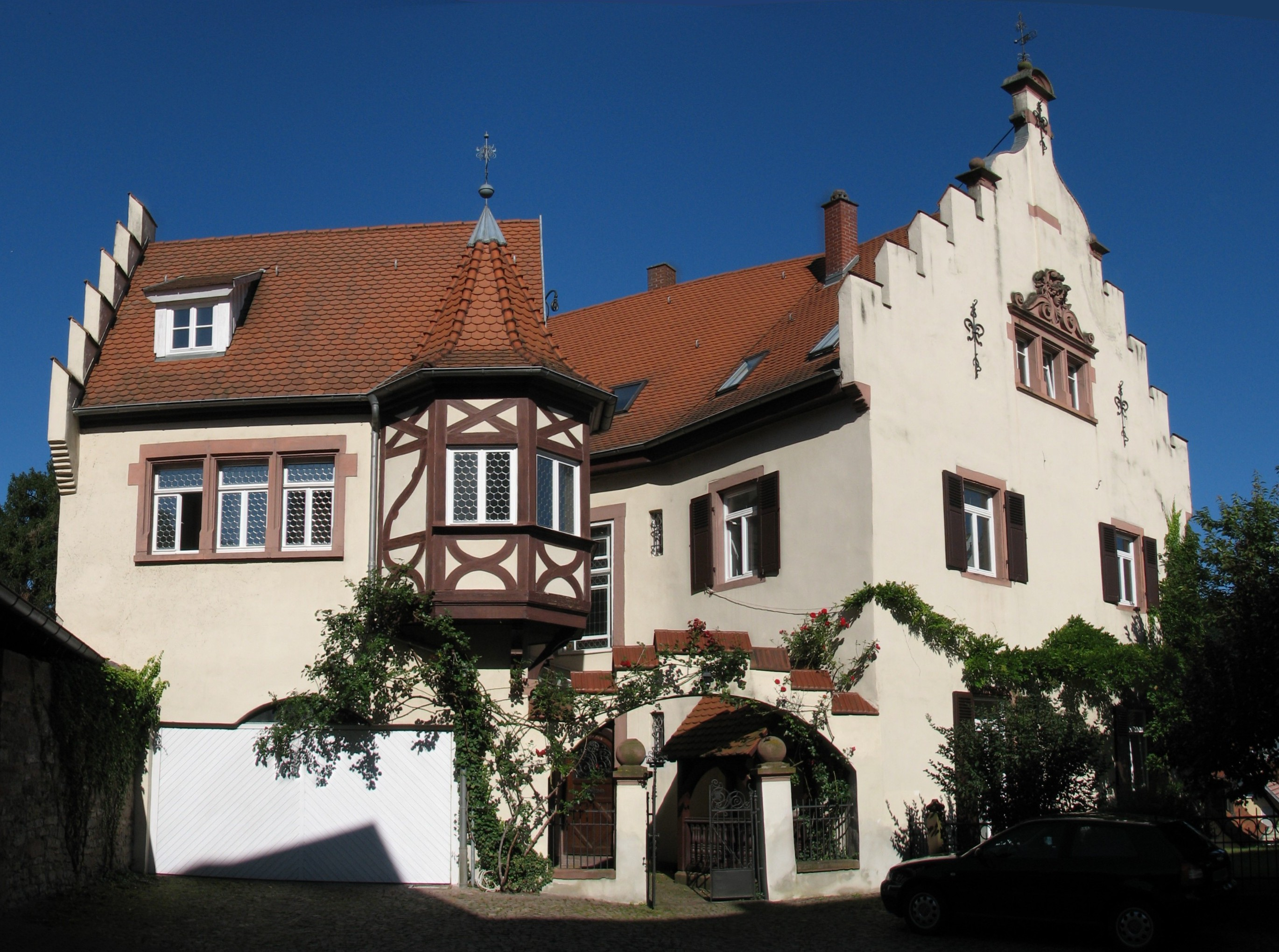
Schloss Mosbach

Schloss Mosbach (Mosbach castle) is a castle in Mosbach, Neckar-Odenwald district, Baden-Württemberg, Germany, dating back to the 14th century.

== History ==
The first evidence of the construction of the residence in Mosbach can be traced back to when the town's fortification was erected by Count Palatine Otto I early in the fourteenth century. The context of the castle's first reigning occupant helps amplify its importance today and at the time it was first built.

Through the partition of King Rupert's lands among the four surviving sons at the time of his death, Mosbach came to be the center of power for that portion of the Palatinate inherited by Otto, with Mosbach Castle as the sovereign's residence. Count Palatine Otto I, who was born in Mosbach in 1390 and then chose to have his residence there as the heir to the Palatinate Electorate in 1410, and his son Otto II, had the Castle expanded considerably after 1430, although the work done on the building was not intended to exude grandness.

The most influential period for the Castle came in 1427 when, alongside the duties involved in administering the Palatinate-Mosbach, Otto I assumed the guardianship of his nephew Louis IV (Ludwig IV) and held the regency by default while his brother Louis III was too weakened and ill to rule upon his return from a crusade to Jerusalem in 1427. Otto I's nephew was still a minor and did not reach the age of majority until 1442. Starting in 1448 the sphere of influence of the Palatinate of Mosbach and its residence once again expanded when Otto I inherited half of the territory of the extinct Palatinate-Neumarkt and purchased the other half from his brother Stefan (Stephen), establishing a further residence in Neumarkt.

The castle's present-day appearance largely stems from renovation carried out in 1898, including bay windows, half-timbered walls and transverse gables.

== See also ==
- List of castles in Baden-Württemberg
- List of castles in Germany
