= Palatine German =

Palatine German may refer to:

- Palatine German language
- The Palatines, a people from the Palatinate

== See also ==
- Palatinate (region)
- Palatinate (disambiguation)
