= Falz (disambiguation) =

Falz or FALZ may refer to:

- FALZ, the DS100 code for Alzey station, Rhineland-Palatinate, Germany
- Falz, stage name for Nigerian rapper Folarin Falana (born 1990)

== See also ==
- Falz-Fein (disambiguation)
- Pfalz (disambiguation)
- Pfaltz (disambiguation)
