= Hoffenheim =

- Stadtteil of Sinsheim
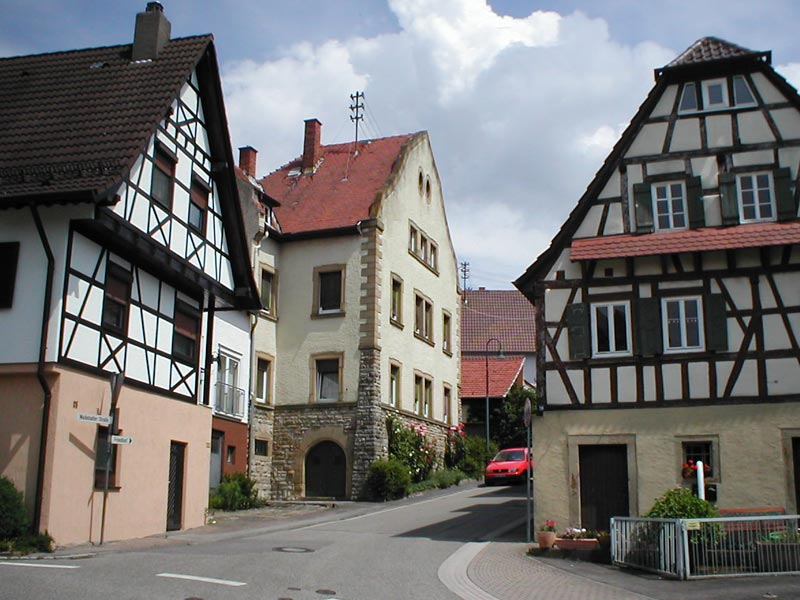
- Historical houses in Wainstädter Straße

- Coat of arms
- Interactive map of Hoffenheim
- Location within Germany Location within Baden-Württemberg
- Coordinates: 49°16′20″N 08°50′40″E
- Country: Germany
- State: Baden-Württemberg
- Admin. region: Karlsruhe
- District: Rhein-Neckar-Kreis
- Town: Sinsheim

Population (2020)
  - Total: 3,191
- Time zone: UTC+01:00 (CET)
  - Summer (DST): UTC+02:00 (CEST)
- Postal codes: 74889
- Dialling codes: 07261
- Vehicle registration: HD

Hoffenheim (German pronunciation: [ˈhɔfn̩haɪm]) is a village in Rhein-Neckar-Kreis, Baden-Württemberg, Germany. It belongs to the municipality of Sinsheim and, as of 2020, it has a population of 3,191.

== History ==
The village, settled since prehistoric times, and first mentioned in 773 as Hovaheim in the Lorsch codex, was officially incorporated on July 1, 1972, into Sinsheim.

== Geography ==
Hoffenheim is located in the Rhine-Neckar metropolitan region, close to the Neckartal-Odenwald nature park. It is 3 kilometres (1.9 mi) to the west of Sinsheim, 6 kilometres (3.7 mi) south of Meckesheim and only approximately 20 kilometres (12 mi) from Heidelberg.

== Sport ==
Hoffenheim is the historic home to football club TSG 1899 Hoffenheim which currently plays in the Bundesliga, Germany's top division, although the senior side now play their home games in the Rhein-Neckar-Arena, located in another Sinsheim suburb, Steinsfurt.

== Gallery ==
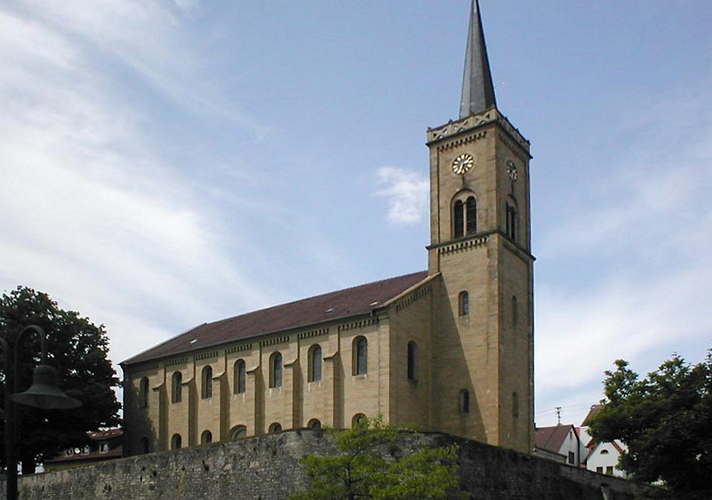
Village church

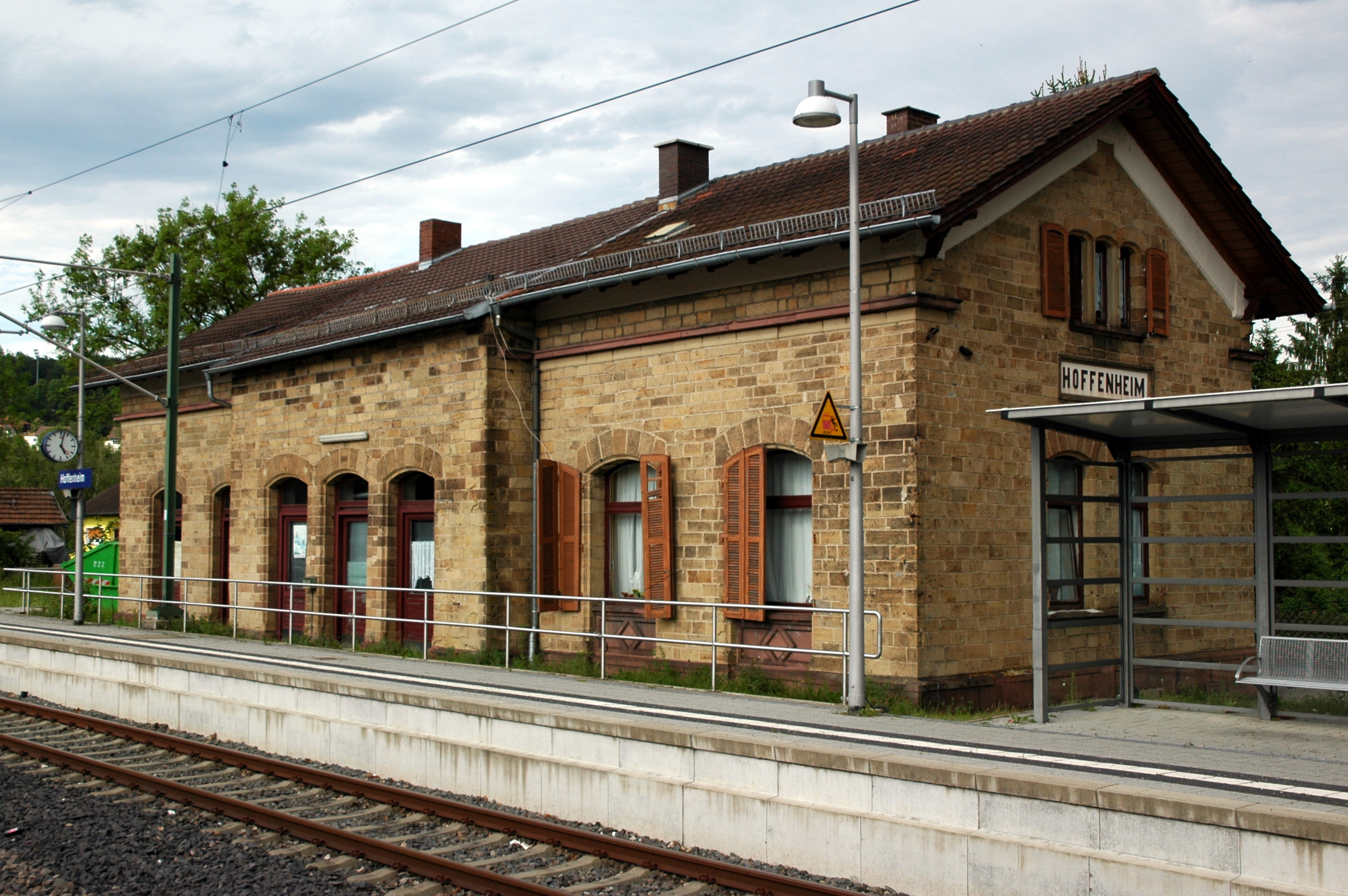
Railway station

== Personalities ==
- Volker Kauder (b. 1949 in Hoffenheim), politician (CDU)
- Dietmar Hopp (b. 1940), co-founder of SAP
- Golineh Atai (b. 1974), German journalist and TV-correspondent
