= Coleman Kaserne =

US Army base in Hessen, Germany, 1933–1992

Coordinates: 50°12′28″N 9°10′20″E

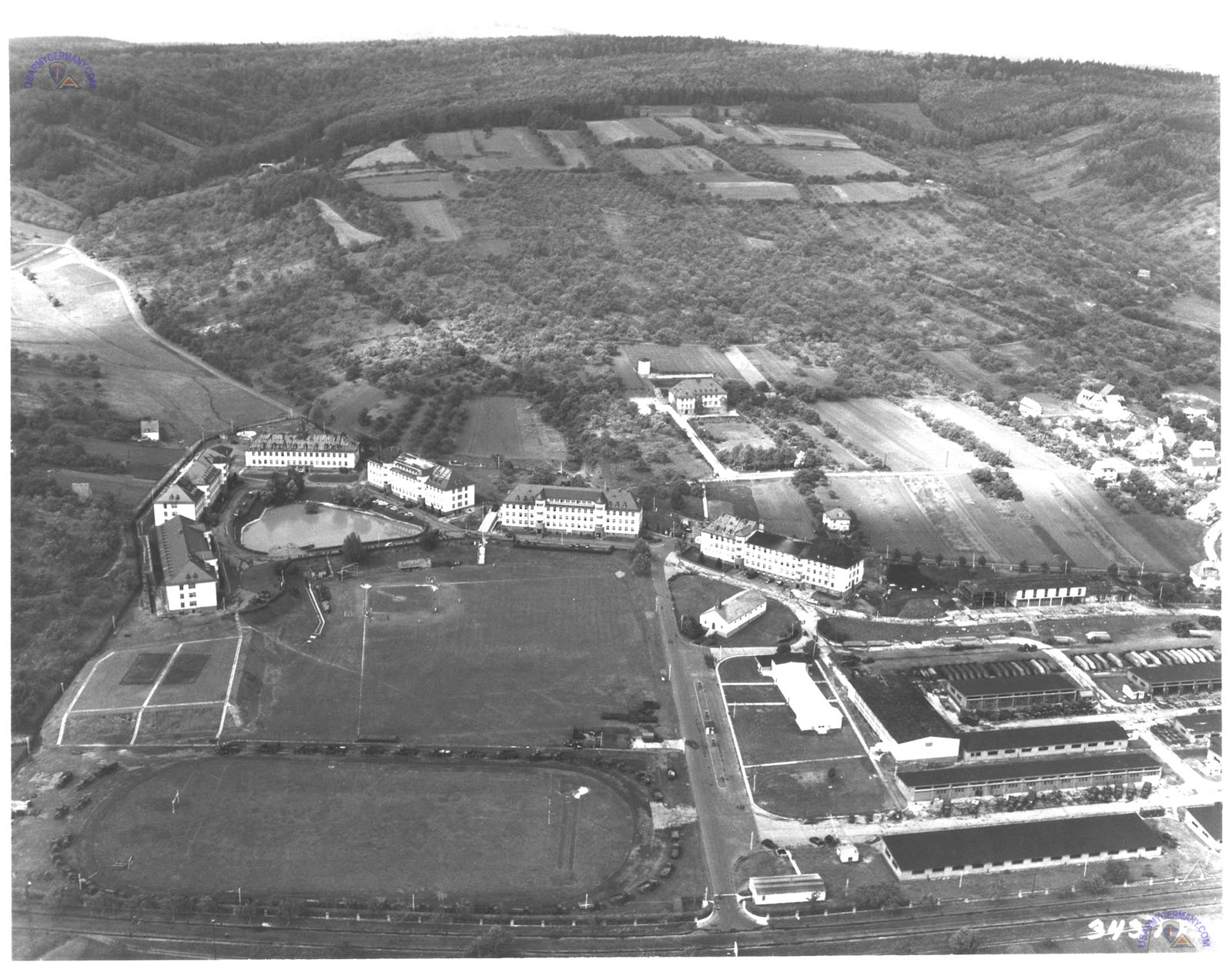
Coleman Kaserne in 1950.

Coleman Kaserne (original German name: Kaserne Gelnhausen) was a United States Army base located in the German city of Gelnhausen, located in the state of Hessen. Coleman Kaserne should not be confused with the U.S. Army "Coleman Barracks" which is located in Mannheim. Kaserne is a German word for barracks.

== History ==
Built for the Wehrmacht, construction of the base was started in 1933 and completed in 1936. It was the garrison of the Wehrmacht's 9th Anti-Tank Battalion (Panzer-Abwehrabteilung 9, abbreviated as PzAbwAbt 9). As part of the German 9th Infantry Division, PzAbwAbt 9 departed for the Western Front in September 1939 (ultimately, the unit was assigned to the war against the Soviet Union); it never returned to Gelnhausen. The Kaserne was captured by the U.S. Army in 1945. In the late 1940s the kaserne was simply called Gelnhausen Kaserne. In 1947 a segregated unit, the 547th Engineer Construction Battalion, was stationed at Gelnhausen Kaserne. In 1948 the 547th was redesignated as an Engineer Combat Battalion, and was assigned to the U.S. Constabulary. The 547th relocated from Gelnhausen to Darmstadt in August, 1951. Also, Gelnhausen Kaserne was temporary home for Headquarters, 14th Armored Cavalry Regiment of the U.S. Constabulary in the late 1940s. Coleman Kaserne received its name in 1950. It was named for Lt Kenneth W. Coleman, a Black soldier who was assigned to the 761st Tank Battalion, and who was killed in combat in the autumn of 1944 in NW Europe. He received the Silver Star.

The 4th Infantry Division (4th ID) occupied Coleman Kaserne from 1951 to 1956 (Most of that time was during the U.S. Occupation Zone in western Germany; the U.S. Occupation in western Germany ended on May 5, 1955). "Combat Command B" (CCB) of the 3rd Armored Division (3rd AD) from Fort Knox, Kentucky, moved into Coleman Kaserne on 30 June 1956, replacing the units from the 4th ID, which rotated to Fort Lewis, Washington. 3AD's Combat Command B converted to the designation, 2nd Brigade, 3rd Armored Division as part of the 1963 ROAD conversion (ROAD: Reorganization Objective Army Division, an Army initiative to reorganize the structure of their divisions). Initial ROAD-authorized battalions at Coleman Kaserne were 1st Battalion, 33rd Armor; 1st and 2nd Battalions, 48th Infantry (Mechanized) (the 1st Bn is currently a Basic Training Unit at Fort Leonard Wood, Missouri); and the 2nd Battalion, 6th Field Artillery. Support units assigned to Coleman Kaserne were the 503rd Military Police and Company E, 122nd Maintenance Battalion.

Following 3rd AD inactivation in 1992, the part of the Coleman Kaserne complex known as Coleman Village became a bedroom community for the 414th Base Support Battalion (BSB). Coleman Village then became quarters for married personnel and their families assigned to the 1st Armored Division's 1st Squadron of the 1st Cavalry Regiment a.k.a. "The Blackhawk Squadron", located at Armstrong Barracks in Büdingen. Shortly thereafter, Coleman Kaserne was returned to the German authorities and was temporarily used to house refugees seeking asylum.

== Notable residents ==
- Jeremy Jones, news editor for ABC affiliate KTUL in Tulsa, Oklahoma was born November, 2nd 1981 at Gelnhausen.
- Tia and Tamera Mowry, actresses, both born July 6, 1978, at Gelnhausen
- Like many American soldiers, Colin Powell, then lieutenant of the 3rd Armored Division, served at Coleman Kaserne in the 2d Armored Rifle Battalion, 48th Infantry (1958-1960). Many years later a street on the kaserne was named after him. During the Second Gulf War there was some discussion about renaming the street because of Germany's stance on the war. The mayor of Gelnhausen strongly objected.

== Present day ==
The base was decommissioned. Many of the original barracks buildings and soldiers' accommodation still stand. They have been modernized and are now home to local businesses and authorities. For a time, the district military replacement office for the Rhine-Main region was housed there. It was later also used as asylum and refugee accommodation. Today, the Coleman Center with stores and supermarkets is located on the site of the barracks. The former parade ground is used for circus performances and music events. The site is also home to a Martin Luther Foundation senior citizens' center and a nursing home.

== Sources ==
- Die Panzer-Abwehrabteilung 9 in Gelnhausen und ihr Schicksal, 1935–1945, Maerchenstrassen-Verlag, 1996, 36396 Steinau an der Strasse, Germany, ISBN 3-924 798-12-5
- 3rd Armored Division Yearbook 1963
- Spearhead Newspaper, May 21, 1973, published by the 3rd Armored Division, Frankfurt, Germany
