= SS Pfalz =

Several steamships have borne the name Pfalz, after the Palatinate region in Germany:

- SS Pfalz (1893) was a 3,849-ton passenger/cargo ship launched on 31 July 1893, by Wigham Richardson, Low Walker, England. Renamed Gertrude Woermann in 1904, and wrecked off Swakopmund, German South-West Africa, on 19 November that same year.
- SS Pfalz (1912) was a 7,128-ton cargo ship launched on 31 August 1912, by Flensburger Schiffbau-Gesellschaft in Flensburg, Germany as Ramses. Renamed Pfalz in 1922, Tiflis in 1933 and Tbilisi in 1937. Struck a submarine-laid mine and sank off the Yenisei Gulf on 7 September 1943.
- SS Pfalz (1913) was a 6,570-ton cargo ship built in 1913 by Bremer Vulkan in Bremen, Germany. Captured by Australian forces in 1914 and renamed Boorara in 1915. Renamed Nereus in 1926. Wrecked off Vancouver Island on 8 August 1937.
