= Pfaltz =

Pfaltz, an obsolete spelling of Pfalz, may refer to:

- Ober Pfaltz or Upper Palatinate, a district in Bavaria, Germany

== People with the surname ==
- Andreas Pfaltz (born 1948), Swiss chemist
- Hugo Pfaltz (1932–2019), American politician

== See also ==
- Falz (disambiguation)
- Pfalz (disambiguation)
