= Falz-Fein =

Falz-Fein may refer to:

- 9838 Falz-Fein, a minor planet
- Woldemar von Falz-Fein (1877–1946), Russian-born Liechtenstein baron and Olympian
- Eduard Theodor von Falz-Fein, a bobsledder
- Eduard von Falz-Fein (1912–2018), a Russian-born businessman, journalist, public figure and sportsman from Liechtenstein
