= House of Palatinate-Birkenfeld =

Collateral line of the Palatine Wittelsbachs

Coat of arms of Georg Wilhelm, Count Palatine of Zweibrücken-Birkenfeld

The House of Palatinate-Birkenfeld (German: Pfalz-Birkenfeld), later Palatinate-Birkenfeld-Zweibrücken, was the name of a collateral line of the Palatine Wittelsbachs. The Counts Palatine from this line initially ruled over only a relatively unimportant territory, namely the Palatine share of the Rear County of Sponheim; however, their importance steadily grew. All living members of the House of Wittelsbach descend from Palatinate-Birkenfeld, which thus became the parent branch of the Kings of Bavaria.

== History ==
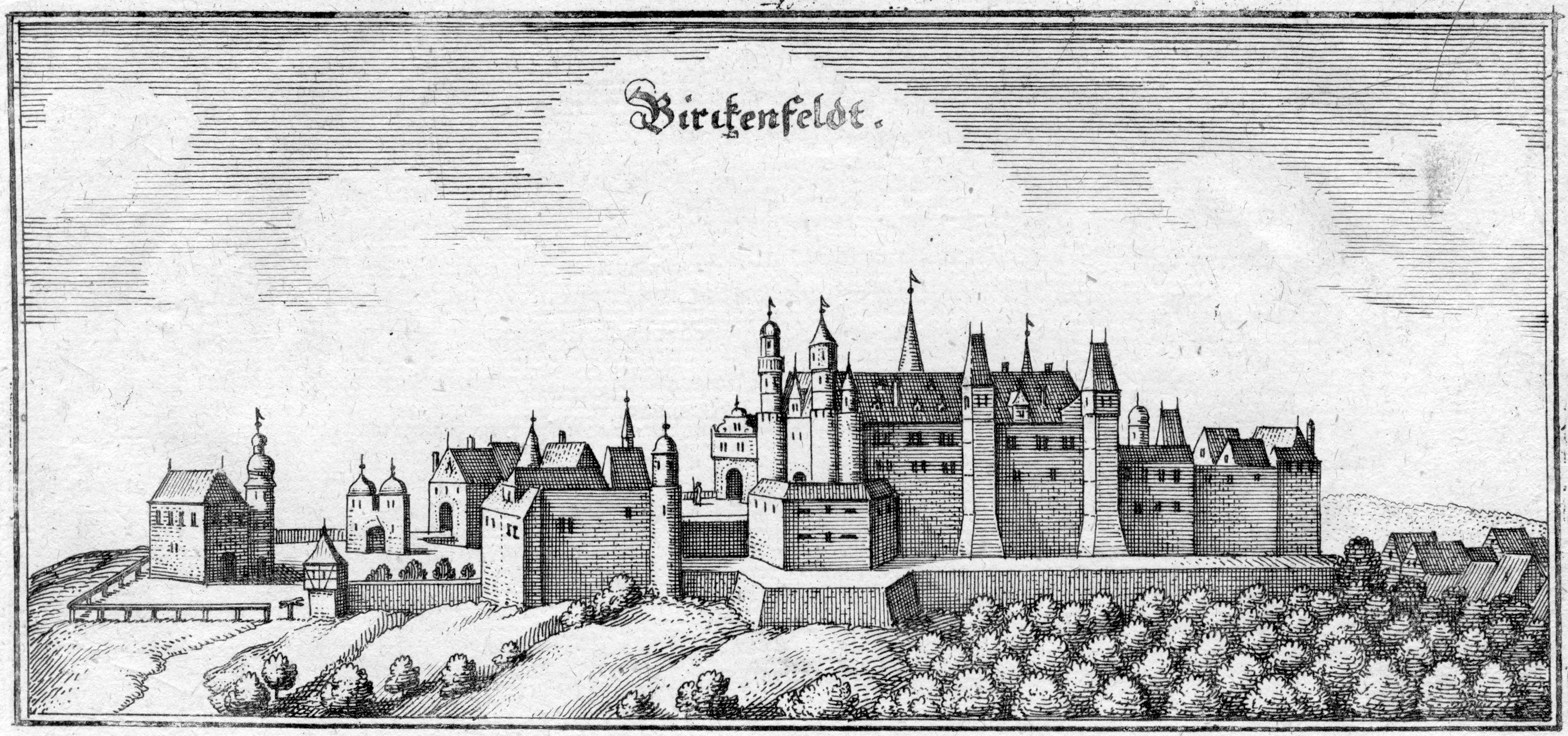
Birkenfeld Castle 1645

The patriarch of the line was Charles I, Count Palatine of Zweibrücken-Birkenfeld. He was a son of Wolfgang, Count Palatine of Zweibrücken, who when he died in 1569, bequeathed the Palatine share of the Rear County of Sponheim to Charles. Charles chose Birkenfeld as his residence and in 1595, through the Treaty of Kastellaun with his joint ruler the Margrave of Baden, Edward Fortunatus, secured exclusive rule in the districts of Birkenfeld and Allenbach (until 1671). Under him, Birkenfeld Castle underwent major expansion. Following Charle' death in 1600, he was succeeded by Georg Wilhelm, who ruled until 1669. He was succeeded by Karl Otto, who died in 1671. The inheritance passed to Christian II, a son of Georg Wilhelm's younger brother, who had previously received the Lordship of Bischweiler from the holdings of Zweibrücken and thus founded the Palatinate-Birkenfeld-Bischweiler line. His son Christian III ended official residency at Birkenfeld in 1717 and resided primarily in Bischweiler, alternating with Zweibrücken after 1734, in which year he succeeded to the Duchy of Zweibrücken. He was succeeded by his son Christian IV, who however was married below his station, to the dancer Marianne Camasse, so that his sons were not entitled to inherit. After Christian's death his nephew Karl III August Christian became ruler. Under his rule, the Rear County of Sponheim was finally partitioned. It was agreed that of the two joint rulers, the Margrave of Baden was to make the division and then the Count Palatine by Rhine was to choose his share. Possibly the hope on the Baden side was that Karl III August would decide on the portion in which Birkenfeld and the family seat were located; nonetheless, Karl III August decided upon the Mosel region around Trarbach, so that after 1776 the Birkenfeld region became the exclusive possession of Baden. His brother Maximilian I Joseph succeeded him after his death in 1795. As a result of the wars of succession of the French Revolution he was the last Duke of Zweibrücken, becoming in 1799 Palatine and Bavarian Elector and in 1806 the first King of Bavaria.

Prior to this, in 1645, John Charles, a younger brother of Christian II, had founded the collateral line of Palatinate-Birkenfeld-Gelnhausen. From 1799 on, his descendants were styled "His Royal Highness Duke in Bavaria".

== Counts Palatine of Birkenfeld ==
=== Palatinate-Birkenfeld ===
- Karl I (1584–1600)
- Georg Wilhelm (1600–1669)
- Karl II Otto (1669–1671)

=== Palatinate-Bischweiler-Birkenfeld ===
- Christian II (1671–1717)
- Christian III (1717–1735), 1731 Count Palatine and Duke of Zweibrücken

=== Palatinate-Birkenfeld-Zweibrücken ===
- Christian IV (1735–1775)
- Karl III August Christian (1775–1795)
- Maximilian I Joseph (1795–1825)

== Literature ==
- Lazer, Stephen A. State Formation in Early Modern Alsace, 1648-1789. Martlesham: Boydell & Brewer, 201 9
- Rodewald, Heinrich: Das Birkenfelder Schloß. Leben und Treiben an einer kleinen Fürstenresidenz 1584-1717. Enke, Birkenfeld 1927.
- Wild, Klaus Eberhard: Zur Geschichte der Grafschaften Veldenz und Sponheim und der Birkenfelder Linien der pfälzischen Wittelsbacher. Mitteilungen des Vereins für Heimatkunde im Landkreis Birkenfeld 43. Birkenfeld 1982.

== Sources ==
- www.genealogienetz.de
