= George William, Count Palatine of Zweibrücken-Birkenfeld =

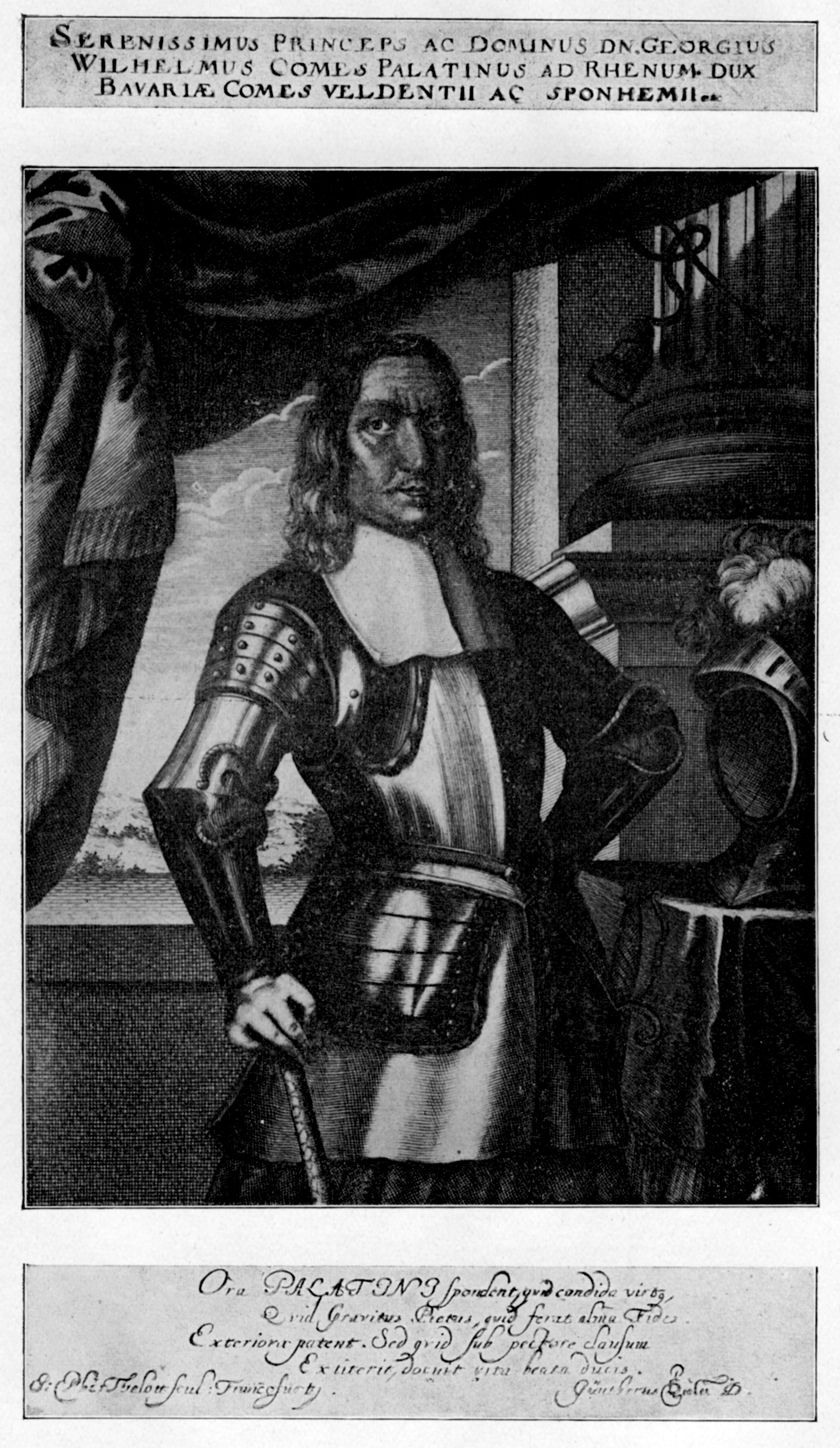
- Count Palatine George William of Zweibrücken-Birkenfeld
- Born: Georg Wilhelm von Pfalz-Zweibrücken-Birkenfeld; 6 August 1591; Ansbach
- Died: 25 December 1669 (aged 78); Birkenfeld
- Noble family: House of Wittelsbach
- Spouses: Dorothea of Solms-Sonnenwalde; Juliana of Salm-Grumbach; Anne Elizabeth of Öttingen-Öttingen
- Issue: Anne Sophie; Elizabeth Juliana; Maria Magdalena; Charles Otto
- Father: Charles I, Count Palatine of Zweibrücken-Birkenfeld
- Mother: Dorothea of Brunswick-Lüneburg

George William (6 August 1591 – 25 December 1669), titular Count Palatine of the Rhine, Duke in Bavaria, Count of Veldenz and Sponheim was the Duke of Zweibrücken-Birkenfeld from 1600 until 1669.

== Life ==
Arms of George William.

George William was born in Ansbach in 1591 as the eldest son of Charles I, Count Palatine of Zweibrücken-Birkenfeld. He succeeded his father in 1600 as Count of Sponheim. He was joint ruler in the Sponheimish condominium together with Margrave Wilhelm of Baden, whose counter-Reformationist movements he laboriously repelled. George William finished the expansion of Castle Birkenfeld, which his father had begun, and set the ground stone for the castle chapel. He is seen as an economical and prudent regent, though he could not do much through the Thirty Years' War. His lands were invaded during the Thirty Years' War in 1635, and in the same year the plague broke out killing 416 people. In the year 1666 he appointed Günter Heyler as court preacher to Birkenfeld. George William died in Birkenfeld in 1669. He was buried in the parish church of Birkenfeld; later his tomb was moved to the chapel of Birkenfeld castle and finally to Meisenheim.

== Marriages and Issue ==
George William married firstly on 30 November 1616 to Dorothea (1586–1625), daughter of Otto, Count of Solms-Sonnenwalde. They had the following children:

1. Dorothea Amalie (30 March 1618 – 6 August 1635)
2. Anne Sophie (12 April 1619 – 1 September 1680), Princess-Abbess of Quedlinburg.
3. Elizabeth Juliana (28 October 1620 – 28 October 1651).
4. Maria Magdalena (8 August 1622 – 27 October 1689), married in 1644 to Anton Günther I, Count of Schwarzburg-Sondershausen.
5. Clara Sybille (14 January 1624 – 1 February 1628).
6. Charles Otto (5 September 1625 – 30 March 1671).

George William married secondly on 30 November 1641 Juliana (1616–1647), daughter of Johann, Wild- und Rheingraf in Grumbach und Rheingrafenstein. They divorced on 18 November 1642 because on 14 February of that year (and only four months after the wedding) Juliana gave birth a child, whose father was in fact Rheingraf Johann Ludwig of Salm-Dhaun.

George William married thirdly on 8 March 1649 to Anne Elizabeth (3 November 1603 – 3 June 1673), daughter of Louis Eberhard, Count of Öttingen-Öttingen. They had no children.

== Ancestors ==
Ancestors of George William, Count Palatine of Zweibrücken-Birkenfeld

8. Louis II, Count Palatine of Zweibrücken
4. Wolfgang, Count Palatine of Zweibrücken
9. Elisabeth of Hesse
2. Charles I, Count Palatine of Zweibrücken-Birkenfeld
10. Philip I, Landgrave of Hesse
5. Anna of Hesse
11. Christine of Saxony
1. George William, Count Palatine of Zweibrücken-Birkenfeld
12. Ernest I, Duke of Brunswick-Lüneburg
6. William, Duke of Brunswick-Lüneburg
13. Sophia of Mecklenburg-Schwerin
3. Dorothea of Brunswick-Lüneburg
14. Christian III of Denmark
7. Dorothea of Denmark
15. Dorothea of Saxe-Lauenburg

== Literature ==
- (in German) Rodewald, Heinrich. Pfalzgraf Georg Wilhelm v. Birkenfeld und seine Kämpfe um das Luthertum in der hinteren Grafschaft Sponheim in den Jahren 1629-1630. Heuser, 1925
- (in German) Dotzauer, Winfried. Geschichte des Nahe-Hunsrück-Raumes von den Anfängen bis zur Französischen Revolution. Franz Steiner Verlag, 2001, p. 351
- (in German) Jahresbericht [afterw.] Trierer Jahresberichte, 1858, p. 50 (digitized)

Regnal titles
Preceded by Charles I	Duke of Zweibrücken-Birkenfeld; 1600 – 1669	Succeeded by Charles II Otto
