= Otto I, Count Palatine of Mosbach =

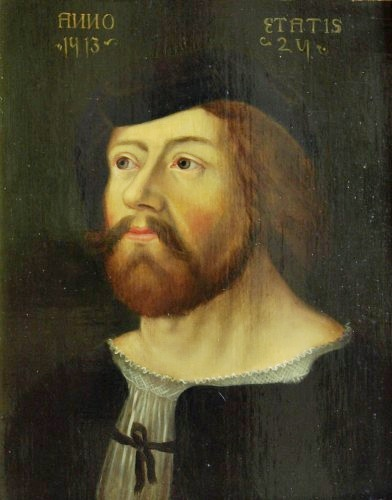
- Born: 24 August 1390; Mosbach
- Died: 5 July 1461 (aged 70); Reichenbach
- Buried: Benedictine Abbey in Reichenbach
- Noble family: Wittelsbach
- Spouse: Joanna of Bavaria-Landshut
- Father: Rupert, King of Germany
- Mother: Elisabeth of Nuremberg

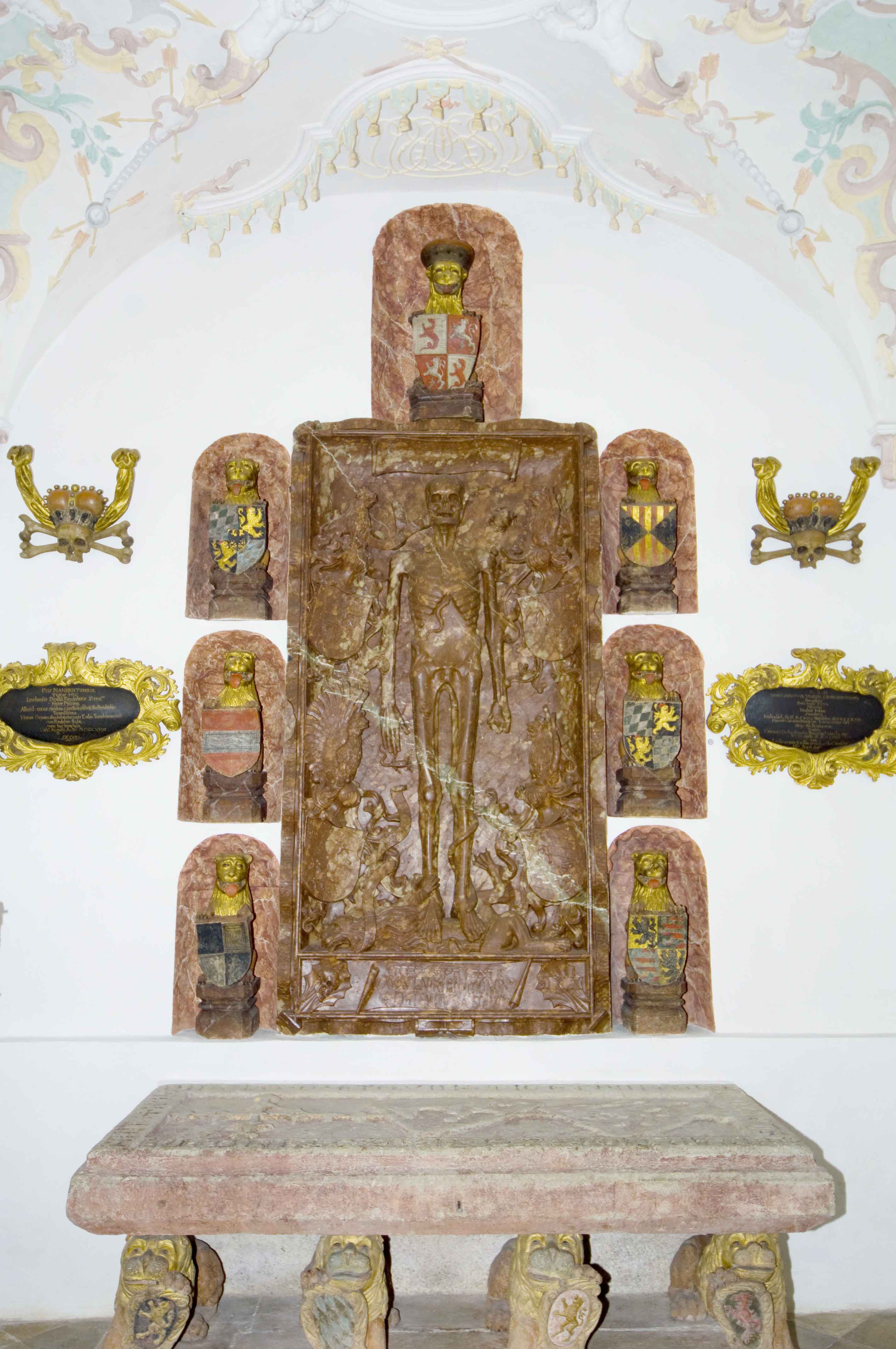
Otto's gravestone, in front of the wall monument to his son John, at Reichenbach.

Otto I (24 August 1390 – 5 July 1461) was the Count Palatine of Mosbach from 1410 until 1448, and the Count Palatine of Mosbach-Neumarkt from 1448 until 1461.

== Life ==
Otto was born in Mosbach in 1390, into the House of Wittelsbach, as the youngest son of Rupert III of the Palatinate, King of Germany, and his wife, Elisabeth of Nuremberg.

== Reign ==
In 1410 after the death of his father, the territories of the Palatinate were divided between his four sons; Otto received the territory around Mosbach and Eberbach. He made Mosbach his capital and began the construction of a new residence there. Otto became the regent of the Electorate of the Palatinate and guardian of his nephew Louis IV after his brother Louis III returned from a pilgrimage to Jerusalem seriously ill and died soon after. He held the regency until 1442.

In 1448 he inherited half of the territory of the extinct Palatinate-Neumarkt line and purchased the other half from his brother Stephen, and he also established a residence in Neumarkt.

== Marriage and issue ==
Otto married Joanna of Bavaria-Landshut (1413 – 20 July 1444), the daughter of duke Henry XVI, Duke of Bavaria in January 1430 and had the following children:

1. Margaret (2 March 1432 – 14 September 1457)
2. Amalie (22 February 1433 – 5 December 1488)
3. Otto (26 June 1435 – 8 April 1499)
4. Rupert (25 November 1437 – 1 November 1465)
5. Dorothea (24 August 1439 – 15 May 1482) prioress in the Liebenau monastery
6. Albert (6 September 1440 – 20 August 1506)
7. Anne (born 1441) prioress in the Himmelskron monastery
8. John (1 August 1443 – 4 October 1486)
9. Barbara (July 1444 - ?) nun in the Liebenau monastery near Worms

== Death ==
Otto died on 5 July 1461 in Reichenbach, aged 70. He was buried in the Benedictine Reichenbach Abbey.

Otto I, Count Palatine of Mosbach House of Wittelsbach Born: 24 August 1390 Died: 5 July 1461
Royal titles
Preceded by Rupert III	Count Palatine of Mosbach; 1410–1448	Title merged with Count Palatine of Mosbach-Neumarkt
Preceded by Christopher	Count Palatine of Neumarkt; 1448; With: Stephen	Title merged with Count Palatine of Mosbach-Neumarkt
New title Consolidation of Count Palatines of Mosbach and Neumarkt	Count Palatine of Mosbach-Neumarkt; 1448–1461	Succeeded by Otto II
