= Charles II Otto, Count Palatine of Zweibrücken-Birkenfeld =

- Born: 5 September 1625; Birkenfeld
- Died: 30 March 1671 (aged 45); Birkenfeld
- Buried: Meisenheim
- Noble family: House of Wittelsbach
- Spouses: Margaret Hedwig, Countess of Hohenlohe-Neuenstein
- Father: George William, Count Palatine of Zweibrücken-Birkenfeld
- Mother: Dorothea, Countess of Solms-Sonnenwalde

Charles II Otto (German: Karl II Otto) (5 September 1625 – 30 March 1671) was the Duke of Zweibrücken-Birkenfeld from 1669 until 1671.

== Life ==
Charles Otto was born in Birkenfeld in 1625, into the House of Wittelsbach, as an only son of George William, Count Palatine of Zweibrücken-Birkenfeld by his first wife, Countess Dorothea of Solms-Sonnenwalde (1586–1625). He succeeded his father in 1669.

== Marriage ==
Charles Otto married his cousin, Countess Margaret Hedwig of Hohenlohe-Neuenstein (1 January 1625 – 24 December 1676), the daughter of Count Kraft VII, Count of Hohenlohe-Neuenstein, on 30 November 1616 and had the following children:

1. Charles William (22 August 1659 – 18 April 1660)
2. Charlotte Sophie (14 April 1662 – 14 August 1708)
3. Hedwig Eleanore (17 August 1663 – 12 April 1721)

== Death ==
Charles Otto died 30 March 1671 in Birkenfeld and was buried in Meisenheim.

== Ancestors ==
Ancestors of Charles II Otto, Count Palatine of Zweibrücken-Birkenfeld

8. Wolfgang, Count Palatine of Zweibrücken
4. Charles I, Count Palatine of Zweibrücken-Birkenfeld
9. Anna of Hesse
2. George William, Count Palatine of Zweibrücken-Birkenfeld
10. William VI, Duke of Brunswick-Lüneburg
5. Dorothea of Brunswick-Lüneburg
11. Dorothea of Denmark
1. Charles II Otto, Count Palatine of Zweibrücken-Birkenfeld
12. Frederick Magnus I, Count of Solms-Laubach
6. Otto, Count of Solms-Sonnenwalde
13. Agnes of Wied
3. Dorothea of Solms-Sonnenwalde
14. Albert, Count of Nassau-Weilburg
7. Anna Amalia of Nassau-Weilburg
15. Anna of Nassau-Dillenburg

Regnal titles
Preceded by George William	Duke of Zweibrücken-Birkenfeld; 1669 – 1671	Succeeded by Christian II
