= Neckartal-Odenwald Nature Park =

Coordinates: 49.46252°N 8.98392°E

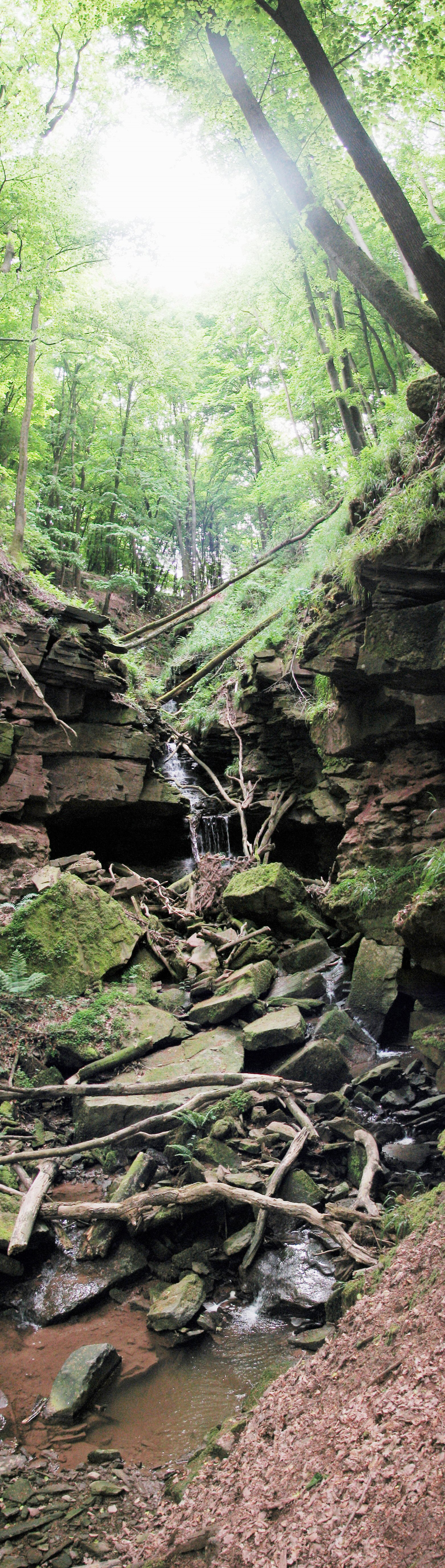
Neckartal-Odenwald Nature Park

The Neckartal-Odenwald Nature Park (German: Naturpark Neckartal-Odenwald) is one of the largest nature parks in Baden-Württemberg, Germany with a size of 1520 km². In the north, the Bergstraße-Odenwald Nature Park is located in Hesse and Bavaria, some areas in the north of Baden-Württemberg belong to both nature parks. The nature park is run by Naturpark Neckartal-Odenwald e. V., which was founded in Eberbach in 1980.

== Geography ==
The nature park is located in the north of the federal state of Baden-Württemberg in the administrative districts of Rhein-Neckar-Kreis and Neckar-Odenwald-Kreis.

It encompasses the wooded low mountain range landscape of the Odenwald with the bordering landscapes of Bergstrasse in the west, Bauland in the east, Kraichgau in the south and the Neckar valley.

The diversity of the landscape also translates into geological diversity, where we can observe granite formations (Odenwald and Bergstraße), sandstone formations (Rear Odenwald, Maly and partially Kraichgau) and limestone formations (Kraichgau and Bauland), as well as the visible activity of volcanoes from 65 million years ago (Katzenbuckel).

The 1:50,000 scale hiking map of the Neckartal-Odenwald Nature Park in the southwest and southeast, published by the Baden-Württemberg State Surveying Office, for example, provides detailed presentation.
