= Palatinate-Birkenfeld-Gelnhausen =

German polity

Coordinates: 50.2079°N 9.1911°E

Palatinate-Birkenfeld-Gelnhausen; Pfalz-Birkenfeld-Gelnhausen
1654–1799
Capital; Circle; Bench	Gelnhausen none none
Partitioned from P.-B.-Bischweiler	1654
Duchy in Bavaria	1799

Palatinate-Birkenfeld-Gelnhausen was a state of the Holy Roman Empire seated in Gelnhausen in the south of modern Hesse, Germany.

Palatinate-Birkenfeld-Gelnhausen was partitioned from Palatinate-Birkenfeld-Bischweiler in 1654. It was a mediate state with few rights. In 1799 the Counts Palatine were granted the title "Duke in Bavaria" by their distant relations, the Duke of Bavaria, which, in 1806, became the first King of Bavaria.

These two lines are the only branches of the House of Wittelsbach which did not eventually become extinct.

Name	Reign
John Charles	1654–1704
Frederick Bernard	1704–1739
John	1739–1780
Charles	1780–1789
William	1789–1799
