= Palatinate-Birkenfeld-Zweibrücken =

Coordinates: 49.2512°N 7.3675°E

Palatinate-Birkenfeld-Zweibrücken; Pfalz-Birkenfeld-Zweibrücken
1731–1797
Capital; Circle; Bench	Zweibrücken; Upper Rhenish; Council of Princes
P.-Z.-Birkenfeld	1731
Ceded to France	1797

Palatinate-Birkenfeld-Zweibrücken was a state of the Holy Roman Empire based around the Duchy of Zweibrücken in modern Rhineland-Palatinate, Germany.

Palatinate-Birkenfeld-Zweibrücken was created in 1731 when Christian III of Palatinate-Zweibrücken-Birkenfeld inherited the Duchy of Zweibrücken. Christian soon died in 1735 and was succeeded by his son Christian IV. Christian IV began his reign obtaining politically favourable conditions for his state, and in this end he formed a close relationship with the court of France. Although he bankrupted the state through his alchemy, art collecting, construction work and a failed attempt to establish a porcelain industry in Zweibrücken, he was considered a good Duke, especially in comparison to his nephew Charles III who succeeded him in 1775.

Charles III began his reign as an absolutist ruler, and in the first two years he endeavoured to dismiss the court and restore the financial situation of the state. He greatly expanded the size of the household of the Duchy which quickly developed into a financial burden itself, further increasing his unpopularity. In 1778/9 the Potato War was fought on Charles' behalf by Prussia and Saxony to prevent Charles Theodore, Duke of Bavaria, exchanging the Duchy of Bavaria for the Austrian Netherlands as Charles was the heir of Bavaria. When the French Revolution broke out he managed to obtain the neutrality of his state by the French, but in 1795 the French invaded and annexed Zweibrücken and Charles fled to Mannheim and later Heidelberg-Rohrbach. He was succeeded in title by his brother Maximilian Joseph in 1795. In 1797 Palatinate-Birkenfeld-Zweibrücken was formally ceded to France, although two years later Maximilian inherited Bavaria.

Name	Reign	Notes
Christian III	1731–1735	Count Palatine of Zweibrücken-Birkenfeld
Christian IV	1735–1775	
Charles III	1775–1795	
Maximilian Joseph	1795–1797	King of Bavaria
