= Otto II, Count Palatine of Mosbach-Neumarkt =

Otto II Mathematicus (26 June 1435 – 8 April 1499) was the Count Palatine of Mosbach-Neumarkt from 1461 until 1499.

== Life ==
Otto was born in 1435 as the eldest son of Otto I, Count Palatine of Mosbach-Neumarkt. He succeeded his father in 1461 and spent most of his life in Neumarkt. He managed to end the controversy of Wolfstein, a castle and city opposite Neumarkt with the same rights which was ruled by the House of Wolfstein, after acquiring the pawned castle from the Neuschönenbergs. Otto II also had a strong interest in astronomy and mathematics, which led to his title "Mathematicus", and he established an observatory on the castle at Neumarkt. In 1490 he retired all active rulership over Mosbach-Neumarkt to Philip, Elector of the Palatinate, and spent the remainder of his life in scientific pursuits.

Otto died in Neumarkt in 1499 childless and was buried in the Church of St Maria. Mosbach-Neumarkt passed to the Electoral Palatinate after his death.

Regnal titles
Preceded by Otto I	Count Palatine of Mosbach-Neumarkt; 1461 – 1499	Succeeded by Philip
