= Palatinate-Mosbach-Neumarkt =

Palatinate-Mosbach-Neumarkt; Pfalz-Mosbach-Neumarkt
1448–99
Capital; Circle; Bench	Mosbach none none
Palatinate-Mosbach	1448
Extinct; to the Palatinate	1499

Palatinate-Mosbach-Neumarkt was a state of the Holy Roman Empire based around Mosbach and Eberbach in the north of modern Baden-Württemberg, and Neumarkt in the Upper Palatinate of Bavaria, Germany.

Palatinate-Mosbach-Neumarkt was created in 1448 when Otto I of Palatinate-Mosbach obtained the entirety of Palatinate-Neumarkt. Otto I's successor Otto II ended the long-running dispute between the House of Wittelsbach and the House of Wolfstein when he acquired the castle of Wolfstein from Neushönenberg. In 1490 all territorial rights over the state were transferred to Philip, Elector Palatine, and Otto II died heirless in 1499.
