= Palatinate-Mosbach =

Palatinate-Mosbach Pfalz-Mosbach
- 1410–1448
- Status: State of the Holy Roman Empire
- Capital: Mosbach
- History
  - Partitioned from the Palatinate: 1410
  - United with Palatinate-Neumarkt: 1448
Preceded by	Succeeded by
Electoral Palatinate	Palatinate-Mosbach-Neumarkt

Palatinate-Mosbach was a state of the Holy Roman Empire centred on Mosbach and Eberbach in the north of modern Baden-Württemberg, Germany.

Palatinate-Mosbach was created in 1410 out of the partition of the Palatinate after the death of King Rupert III for his son Otto. In 1448 Otto inherited half of Palatinate-Neumarkt, purchased the other half, and renamed his state Palatinate-Mosbach-Neumarkt.
