= Palatinate-Zweibrücken-Birkenfeld =

State in the Holy Roman Empire (1569-1731)

Palatinate-Zweibrücken-Birkenfeld Pfalz-Zweibrücken-Birkenfeld (German)
- 1569–1731
- Coat of arms
- Status: State of the Holy Roman Empire
- Capital: Birkenfeld
- Common languages: German
- Religion: Lutheranism (1569–1588); Calvinism (1588–1731)
- Government: Imperial Estate
- Count
  - 1569–1600 (first): Charles I
  - 1717–1731 (last): Christian III
- History
  - Partition of Palatine Zweibrücken: 1569
  - Separation of Palatinate-Birkenfeld-Bischweiler: 1600
  - Incorporation into Palatine Zweibrücken: 1731
| Preceded by | Succeeded by |
| Palatine Zweibrücken | Palatine Zweibrücken; Palatinate-Birkenfeld-Bischweiler |
- Today part of: Germany

Palatinate-Zweibrücken-Birkenfeld (Note: German: Pfalz-Zweibrücken-Birkenfeld) was a state of the Holy Roman Empire based around Birkenfeld within the Upper Rhenish Circle. It was formed in 1569, after the partition of Palatine Zweibrücken and was reincorporated into that state in 1731.

== History ==
Palatinate-Zweibrücken-Birkenfeld was created in 1569 in the partition of the County Palatine of Zweibrücken after the death of Wolfgang for his youngest son Charles I. After Charles' death in 1600 his state was partitioned into itself and Palatinate-Birkenfeld-Bischweiler by his sons, with George William succeeding him in Birkenfeld.

In 1635 the state was invaded and devastated during the Thirty Years' War, and in the same year decimated by an outbreak of the Plague. George William died in 1669 and was succeeded by his son Charles II Otto. Two years later he died, and with him the male line of the branch, so the state passed to Christian II of Palatinate-Birkenfeld-Bischweiler. Christian II died in 1717 and was succeeded by his son Christian III.

In 1731 Christian inherited the Duchy of Zweibrücken and its seat in the Imperial Diet, and renamed his territories to Palatinate-Birkenfeld-Zweibrücken.

== List of rulers ==
| Name | Reign | Notes |
|---|---|---|
| Charles I | 1569–1600 | |
| George William | 1600–1669 | |
| Charles II Otto | 1669–1671 | |
| Christian II | 1671–1717 | Count Palatine of Birkenfeld-Bischweiler |
| Christian III | 1717–1731 | Count Palatine of Birkenfeld-Zweibrücken |
