= Gelnhausen =

- Town
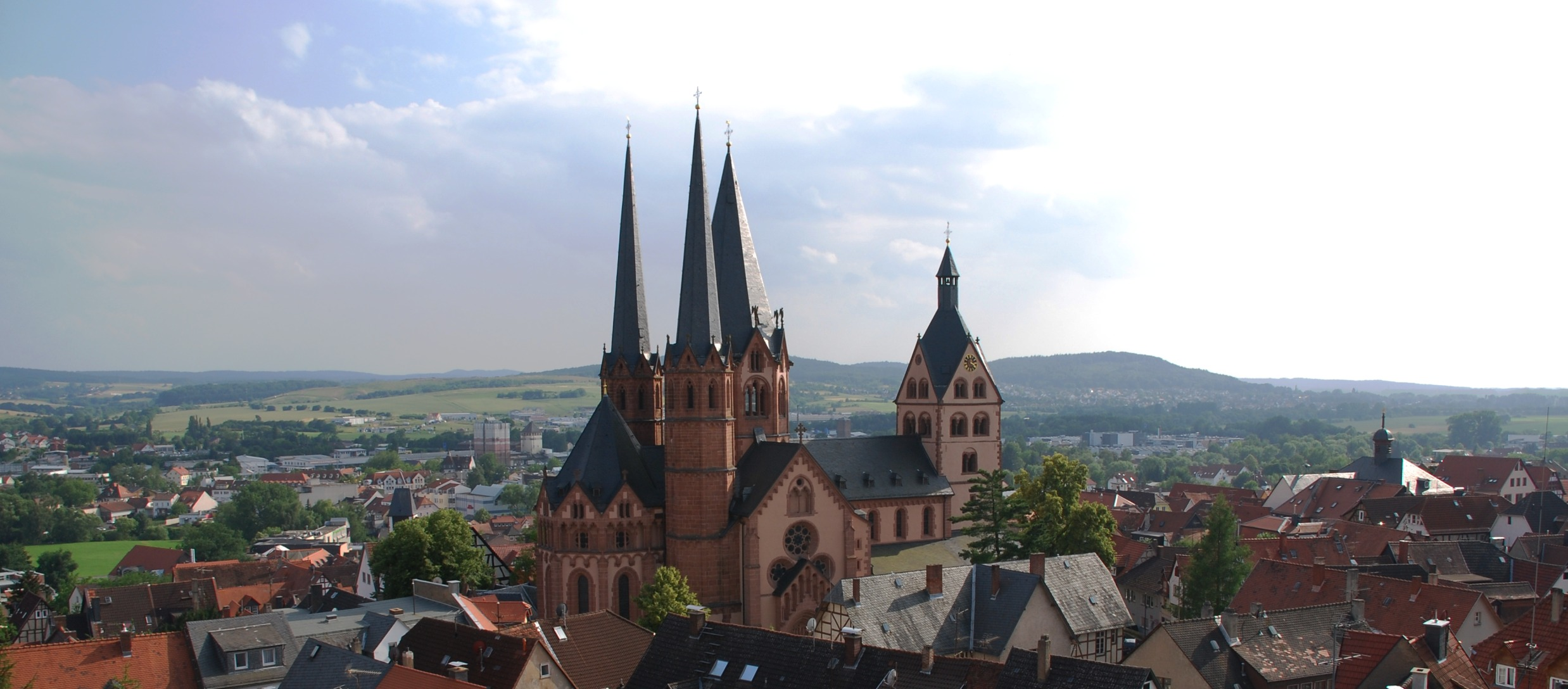
- View of Gelnhausen with the Marienkirche

- Coat of arms

- Location of Gelnhausen within Main-Kinzig-Kreis district
- Interactive map of Gelnhausen
- Location within Germany Location within Hesse
- Coordinates: 50°12′N 09°10′E
- Country: Germany
- State: Hesse
- Admin. region: Darmstadt
- District: Main-Kinzig-Kreis
- Subdivisions: 6 districts

Government
  - Mayor (2017–23): Daniel Christian Glöckner

Area
  - Total: 45.15 km^{2} (17.43 sq mi)
- Elevation: 180–312 m (591–1,024 ft)

Population (2025-12-31)
  - Total: 23,401
  - Density: 518.3/km^{2} (1,342/sq mi)
- Time zone: UTC+01:00 (CET)
  - Summer (DST): UTC+02:00 (CEST)
- Postal codes: 63571
- Dialling codes: 06051
- Vehicle registration: MKK, GN, SLÜ
- Website: www.gelnhausen.de

Gelnhausen (German pronunciation: [ɡɛlnˈhaʊzn̩]) is a town, and the capital of the Main-Kinzig-Kreis, in Hesse, Germany. It is located approximately 40 kilometers east of Frankfurt am Main, between the Vogelsberg mountains and the Spessart range at the river Kinzig. It is one of the eleven towns (urban municipalities) in the district. Gelnhausen has around 22,000 inhabitants.

== History ==
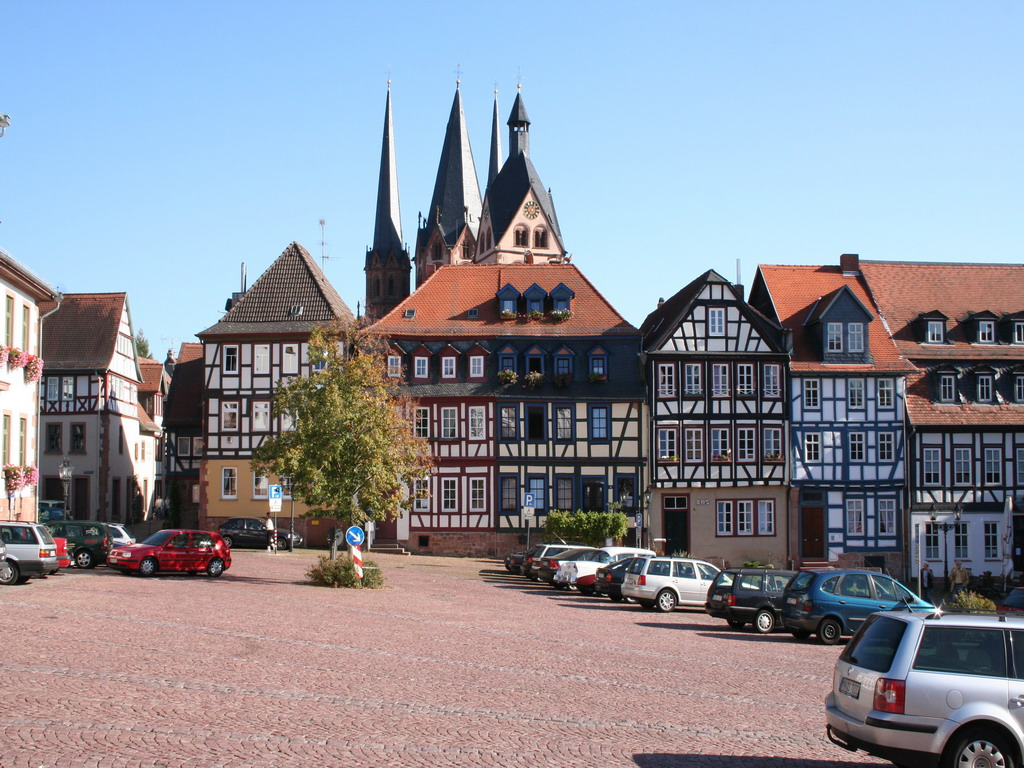
Obermarkt

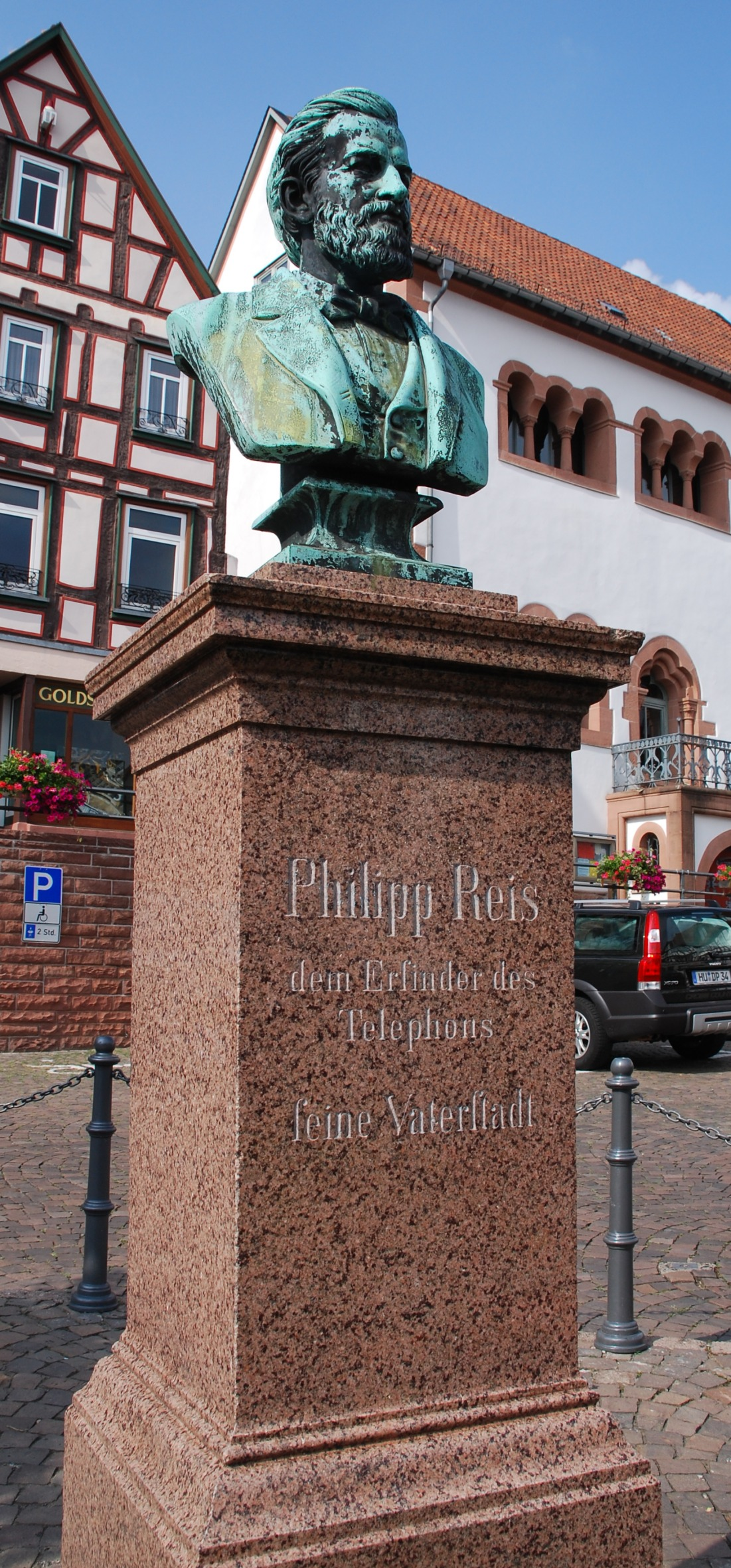
Monument to Philipp Reis, an early telephone inventor

Gelnhausen is located on the German Fairy Tale Route, a tourist route, and nicknamed "Barbarossastadt". The Imperial Palace Gelnhausen was founded by Emperor Frederick Barbarossa between 1169 and 1170 because the Gelnhausen settlements were at the intersection of the Via Regia trade road. Gelnhausen received town privileges. The emperor also granted trade privileges like the staple right which forced traveling merchants to offer their goods in the town for three days. In 1180 the Gelnhausen Act was passed and Henry the Lion exiled. Westphalia became a district of Cologne, while the rest of Henry's Saxony territory passed to Count of Anhalt Bernhard. Henry's Bavarian territories were bestowed upon Otto of Wittelsbach who had been a loyal ally of Emperor Barbarossa.

Gelnhausen was a thriving trade town and head of a league of 16 towns of the Wetterau region. However prosperity came to an end in 1326 when Emperor Louis IV gave the town in pawn to the counts of Hanau, redeemed shortly afterwards. In 1349 Count Günther von Schwarzburg received Gelnhausen from Emperor Charles IV for renouncing his claims as elected King of the Romans, in condominium with the counts of Hohnstein, who sold their share to Schwarzburg in 1431. Schwarzburg was acquired in 1435 by Elector Palatine Louis III and the Hanau, since raised to a county.

Repeated plundering in the Thirty Years' War as depicted by Hans Jakob Christoffel von Grimmelshausen in his novel Simplicius Simplicissimus made it nearly uninhabitable. In 1736, the extinction of the comital line of Hanau meant the condominium share was inherited by the Landgraviate of Hesse-Kassel, who acquired the Palatinate's share ten years later.

The varying lords made continued attempts to challenge Gelnhausen's imperial immediacy, it however formally remained a Reichsstadt. During the German Mediatisation of 1803 the city became a part of the Landgraviate of Hesse-Kassel, which was raised to an electorate and, after the Austro-Prussian War of 1866, was annexed by Prussia. At this time Gelnhausen had completely recovered, and with the Gründerzeit economic boom it became a centre of the German rubber industry.

In 1996, the town hosted the 36th Hessentag state festival.

== The Holocaust ==
During the Nazi era, Gelnhausen was reported judenfrei on November 1, 1938, by propaganda newspaper Kinzigwacht after its synagogue was closed and remaining local Jews forced to leave the town.

From the 1930s Gelnhausen was a garrison town of the German Wehrmacht and, after World War II, of the United States Army. The US Army closed Coleman Kaserne in 2007.

== Arts and culture ==
- Medieval town center with historic buildings like the Romanisches Haus (ca. 1180), the Gotisches Haus (1351/52).
- The Kaiserpfalz Gelnhausen is an Imperial Palace and was erected between 1160 and 1180 at the time of Gelnhausen's foundation southeast of the town on an island in the Kinzig river. The groundwork is stabilized by 12,000 logs, driven into the earth. Today it is the best preserved Kaiserpfalz from this era.
- The Marienkirche is the most recognizable landmark of Gelnhausen. It shows both Romanesque (like the six-storey west tower) and Gothic architecture (the octagonal crossing tower and the east towers) elements. The church was built from local bunter between 1170 and 1250 by Selbold Abbey, replacing a simple chapel from ca. 1100 of which some traces remain. In 1543, Gelnhausen turned Protestant and the church became the Protestant parish church.
- The Catholic church Peterskirche has its origins in the early 13th century. Rich citizens of Gelnhausen planned to erect a church within the town, causing a conflict with the Selbold Abbey that owned the clerical patronage for Gelnhausen. This conflict was escalated up to Pope Gregory IX who decided in favour of the abbey. From the 13th to the 15th century the church was used for weddings, baptisms, and funerals. After the Reformation, the building became the property of the town. It subsequently fell into ruin and was sold in 1830 to a local merchant. After the demolition of the second tower, a cigar factory was built in it. In 1920, the Catholic community of Gelnhausen bought the church and partly restored it over an 18-year period. A complete restoration took place in from 1982 till 1983.

== Town twinning ==
Gelnhausen is twinned with:

- Clamecy, France
- Marling, Italy

== Transport ==
Gelnhausen lies directly on the German autobahn A66. Gelnhausen station is located on the Kinzig Valley Railway, a major line between Frankfurt and Fulda. Regional services from Frankfurt to Fulda or Wächtersbach stop in Gelnhausen.

== Notable people ==
- August Brey (1864–1937), politician, member of the Weimar National Assembly, born in Ronnenberg
- Johann Heinrich Cassebeer (1784–1850), naturalist and mayor of Gelnhausen
- Hans Fischinger (1909-1944), film director, brother of Oskar
- Oskar Fischinger (1900–1967), film director
- Hans Joachim Fröhlich (died 2008), forestry scientist and conservationist, born at Meerholz, Gelnhausen
- Jost Hoen (c. 1500–1569), teacher, pedagogue and statesman
- Tia and Tamera Mowry (born 1978), actresses
- Klaus Ploghaus (born 1956), athlete (hammer throw, 3rd place in the 1984 Summer Olympics)
- Johann Philipp Reis (1834–1874), inventor of one of the first telephones
- Friedrich Armand Strubberg (1806–1889), merchant, physician, colonist in North America, who claimed to be a direct descendant of Frederick I of Sweden. Buried in Gelnhausen
- Hans Jakob Christoffel von Grimmelshausen (c. 1622–1676), writer; In his work Simplicissimus, the sacking of Gelnhausen during the Thirty Years' War is graphically described
- Wolfram Weimer (born 1964), chief editor of the Cicero magazine
- Ernest Kees *1789 in Gelnhausen, Fächerfabrikant in Paris

Like many American soldiers, in 1959 Colin Powell, then lieutenant of the 3rd Armored Division, served at Coleman Kaserne. A street was named after him. During the Second Gulf War, there was some discussion about renaming the street because of Germany's stance on the war. The mayor of Gelnhausen strongly objected.

== See also ==
- Palatinate-Birkenfeld-Gelnhausen
