= Charles I, Count Palatine of Zweibrücken-Birkenfeld =

Charles I
- Count Palatine of Zweibrücken-Birkenfeld
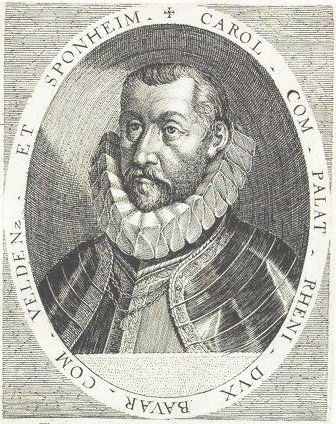
- Charles I, Count Palatine by Rhine
- Born: 4 September 1560; Neuburg an der Donau
- Died: 16 December 1600 (aged 40); Birkenfeld
- Burial: Meisenheim
- Spouse: Dorothea of Brunswick-Lüneburg (m. 1590)
- Issue Detail: George William, Count Palatine of Zweibrücken-Birkenfeld; Sophie, Countess of Hohenlohe-Neuenstein; Frederick of Zweibrücken-Birkenfeld; Christian I, Count Palatine of Birkenfeld-Bischweiler
- House: Wittelsbach
- Father: Wolfgang, Count Palatine of Zweibrücken
- Mother: Anna of Hesse

Charles I of Zweibrücken-Birkenfeld (4 September 1560 – 16 December 1600), Count Palatine of the Rhine, Duke in Bavaria, Count to Veldenz and Sponheim was the Duke of Zweibrücken-Birkenfeld from 1569 until 1600.

== Early life and ancestry ==
Charles was born in Neuburg in 1560, a member of the House of Wittelsbach, as the youngest son of Wolfgang, Count Palatine of Zweibrücken by his wife, Anna of Hesse, daughter of Philip I, Landgrave of Hesse.

== Biography ==
After his father's death in 1569, Charles and his brothers partitioned his territories: Charles, as the youngest son, received only the Palatine share on the Rear County of Sponheim, a small territory around Birkenfeld.

Charles I is the founder of the House of Palatinate-Birkenfeld. He was a prince of a relatively unimportant state, and his chief fame is that the Dukes and later Kings of Bavaria descended from him.

== Marriage and issue ==
Charles married Duchess Dorothea of Brunswick-Lüneburg (1 January 1570 – 15 August 1649), a member of the House of Welf and daughter of William VI, Duke of Brunswick-Lüneburg, and Princess Dorothea of Denmark, on 23 February 1590.

Together, they had four children:

1. George William (6 August 1591 – 25 December 1669)
2. Sophie (29 March 1593 – 16 November 1676), married to Crato VII of Hohenlohe-Neuenstein (14 November 1582 – 11 October 1641)
3. Frederick (29 October 1594 – 20 July 1626)
4. Christian (3 November 1598 – 6 September 1654)

== Death ==
Charles died in Birkenfeld in 1600, aged 40. He was interred, alongside his wife, in the Schlosskirche Meisenheim, Bad Kreuznach, Rhineland-Palatinate.

== Ancestors ==
Ancestors of Charles I, Count Palatine of Zweibrücken-Birkenfeld

16. Louis I, Count Palatine of Zweibrücken
8. Alexander, Count Palatine of Zweibrücken
17. Johanna of Croÿ
4. Louis II, Count Palatine of Zweibrücken
18. Kraft VI, Count of Hohenlohe-Weikersheim
9. Margarete of Hohenlohe-Neuenstein
19. Helene of Württemberg
2. Wolfgang, Count Palatine of Zweibrücken
20. Louis II, Landgrave of Lower Hesse (= 24)
10. William I, Landgrave of Lower Hesse
21. Mechthild of Württemberg-Urach (= 25)
5. Elisabeth of Hesse
22. William IV, Duke of Brunswick-Lüneburg
11. Anna of Brunswick
23. Elizabeth of Stolberg-Wernigerode
1. Charles I, Count Palatine of Zweibrücken-Birkenfeld
24. Louis II, Landgrave of Lower Hesse (= 20)
12. William II, Landgrave of Hesse
25. Mechthild of Württemberg-Urach (= 25)
6. Philip I, Landgrave of Hesse
26. Magnus II, Duke of Mecklenburg
13. Anna of Mecklenburg-Schwerin
27. Sophie of Pomerania-Stettin
3. Anna of Hesse
28. Albert III, Duke of Saxony
14. George, Duke of Saxony
29. Sidonie of Poděbrady
7. Christine of Saxony
30. Casimir IV Jagiellon
15. Barbara Jagiellon
31. Elisabeth of Austria

Preceded by Wolfgang of Palatinate-Zweibrücken	Duke of Zweibrücken-Birkenfeld; 1569–1600	Succeeded by George William of Palatinate-Zweibrücken-Birkenfeld
Preceded by Wolfgang of Palatinate-Zweibrücken	Duke of Zweibrücken-Birkenfeld; 1569–1600	Succeeded by Christian I of Palatinate-Birkenfeld-Bischweiler
