= House of Palatinate-Neumarkt =

Palatinate-Neumarkt (German: Pfalz-Neumarkt) was a subdivision of the Wittelsbach dynasty of the German Electoral Palatinate. Its capital was Neumarkt in der Oberpfalz.

== History ==
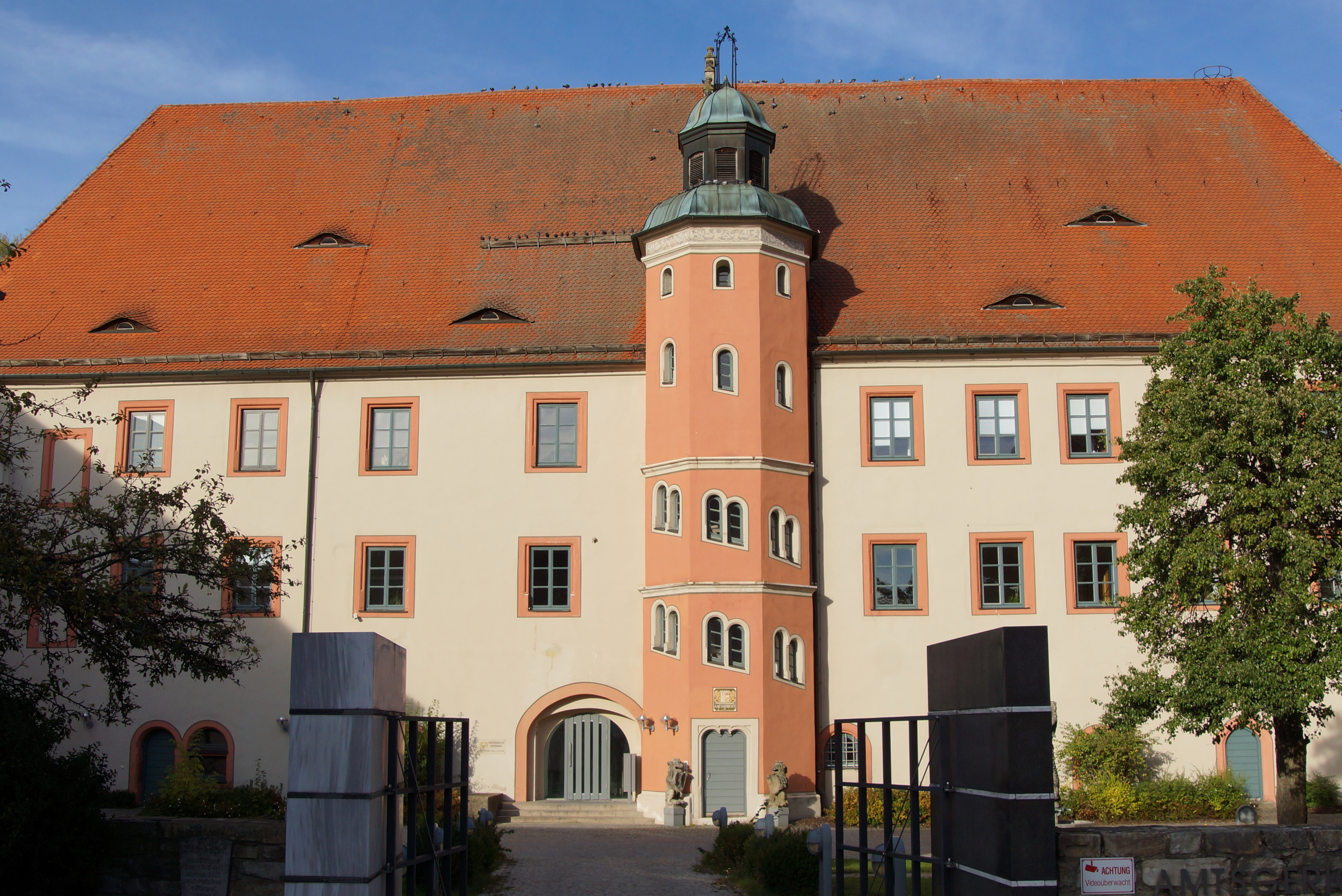
Neumarkt Castle.

Palatinate-Neumarkt was first formed from the lineage of Rupert of Germany following his death in 1410. The title was first granted to John, Count Palatine of Neumarkt in 1410. His son, Christopher of Bavaria, who would later become the monarch of the Kalmar Union, inherited the title in 1443. Palatinate-Neumarkt ceased to exist after the death of Christopher. the properties of the house were inherited by Palatinate-Mosbach, later becoming Palatinate-Mosbach-Neumarkt.

In 1524, a new apanage named Palatinate-Neumarkt was created for Wolfgang of the Palatinate. When he died in 1558, it fell back to the Electoral Palatinate.

== List of counts palatinate of Neumarkt ==
- John, Count Palatine of Neumarkt, 1410–1443
- Christopher of Bavaria, 1443–1448
- Wolfgang of the Palatinate, 1524–1558
