= Alexandre Berthier, 4th Prince of Wagram =

French noble

Alexandre Berthier
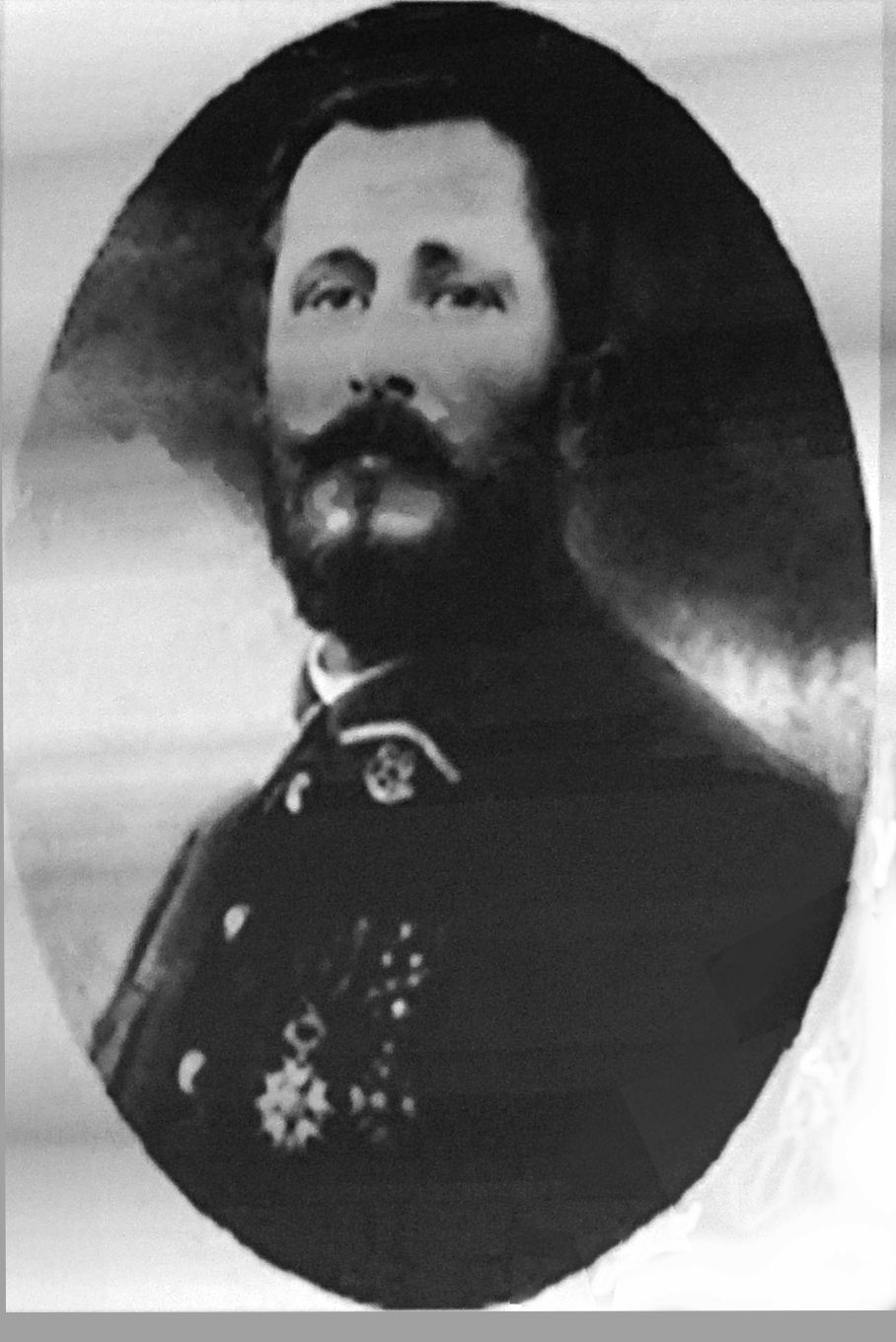

4th Prince of Wagram
- Tenure: 15 July 1911 – 30 May 1918
- Predecessor: Alexandre Berthier
- Full name: Alexandre Louis Philippe Marie Berthier
- Born: 20 July 1883; Paris
- Died: 30 May 1918 (aged 34); Fort de Condé-sur-Aisne
- Buried: Château de Grosbois
- Noble family: Berthier
- Father: Alexandre Berthier, 3rd Prince of Wagram
- Mother: Baroness Bertha Clara von Rothschild

Alexandre Louis Philippe Marie Berthier, 4th Prince de Wagram (20 July 1883 – 30 May 1918) was a French nobleman and an art collector.

== Early life ==
Born as the son of Alexandre Berthier, 3rd Prince of Wagram (1836–1911) and Baroness Bertha Clara von Rothschild (1862–1903), a member of the German branch of the prominent Rothschild family, Alexandre Berthier grew up at the family's ancestral home, the Château de Grosbois, a large estate in Boissy-Saint-Léger, southeast of Paris. He had two sisters, Elisabeth (1885–1960) and Marguerite (1887–1966), the latter of whom married Prince Jean Victor de Broglie.

== Biography ==
Alexandre Berthier was an active collector of modern art. He owned works by prominent artists such as Alfred Sisley, Camille Pissarro, Claude Monet, and Pierre-Auguste Renoir. In his will, he bequeathed 17 of Renoir’s paintings to the French nation.

Before leaving for the French Army and serving in World War I on 1 August 1914, Berthier bequeathed the Château de Grosbois to his sister. He served as an army captain and led a company of chasseurs during the Third Battle of the Aisne. He sustained fatal wounds from shell fire at Fort de Condé-sur-Aisne and died on 30 May 1918. Never married, he had no legitimate children. However he did have a daughter, Monique, born in 1914 out of wedlock, whose mother was Marie-Louise Salivas. There were prolonged legal proceedings in 1922 and a settlement was agreed upon. Monique was entitled to the name Berthier de Wagram. The nobility title became extinct upon his death. Berthier was buried at the Château de Grosbois, alongside his father and grandfather.

Alexandre Berthier served as the model for a minor character in Marcel Proust's multi-part novel In Search of Lost Time. His mother is mentioned more frequently as Princess of Iéna.

== Ancestry ==
Ancestors of Alexandre Berthier, 4th Prince of Wagram

16. Jean-Baptiste Berthier
8. Louis-Alexandre Berthier, 1st Prince of Wagram, Sovereign Prince of Neuchâtel and Vice-Constable of the Empire
17. Marie Françoise L'Huillier de La Serre
4. Napoléon Alexandre Berthier, 2nd Prince of Wagram
18. Duke Wilhelm in Bavaria
9. Duchess Maria Elisabeth in Bavaria
19. Countess Palatine Maria Anna of Zweibrücken-Birkenfeld
2. Alexandre Berthier, 3rd Prince of Wagram
20. François Clary
10. Joseph Nicolas Clary, 1st Comte Clary et de l'Empire
21. Françoise Rose Somis
5. Françoise Clary
22. Marie François Rouyer, 1st Baron Rouyer et de l'Empire
11. Malcy Anne Jeanne Rouyer
1. Alexandre Louis Philippe Marie Berthier, 4th Prince of Wagram
24. Mayer Amschel Rothschild (=28)
12. Carl Mayer, Baron von Rothschild
25. Guttle Schnapper (=29)
6. Mayer Carl, Baron von Rothschild
26. Moses Isaac Herz
13. Adelheid Herz
27. Klara Salomon-Saaling
3. Bertha Clara von Rothschild
28. Mayer Amschel Rothschild (=24)
14. Nathan Mayer, Baron von Rothschild
29. Guttle Schnapper (=25)
7. Louise von Rothschild
30. Levy Barent Cohen
15. Hannah Barent-Cohen
31. Lydia Diamantschleifer
