= Alexandre Berthier, 3rd Prince of Wagram =

French nobleman

Alexandre Berthier
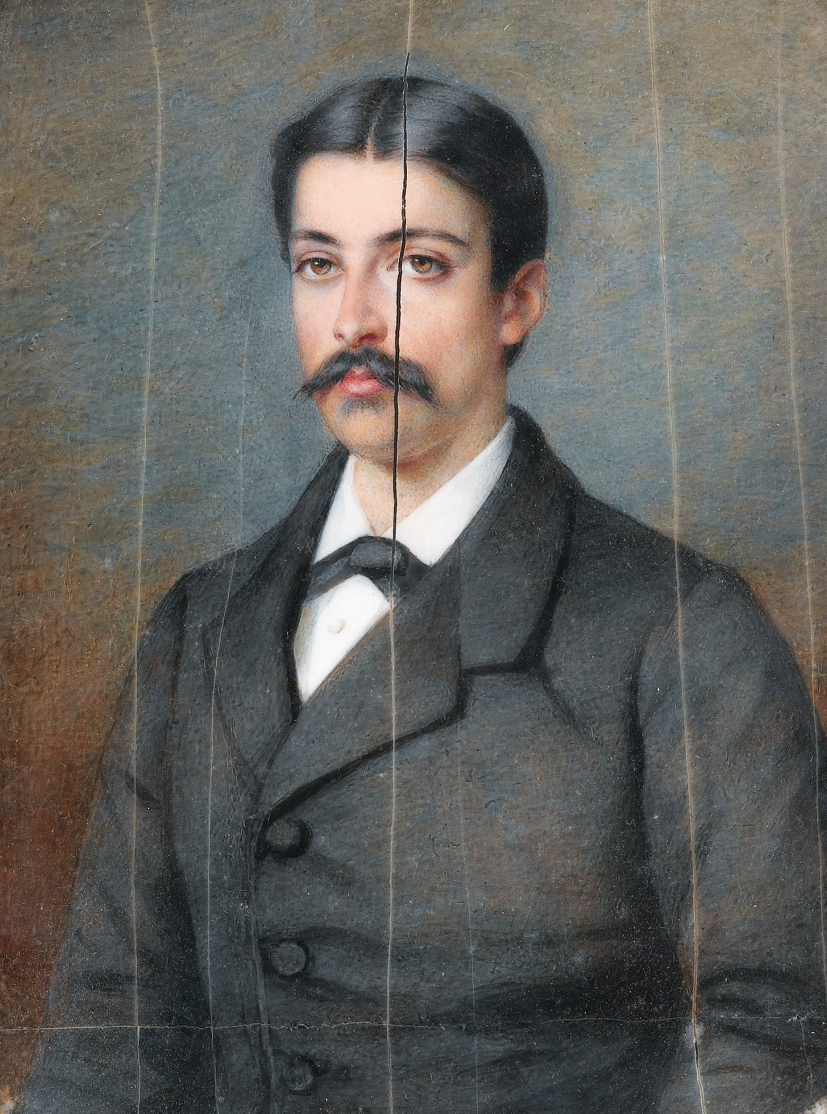
- Portrait by Pierre de Pommayrac, 1866

3rd Prince of Wagram
- Tenure: 10 February 1887 - 15 July 1911
- Predecessor: Napoléon Alexandre Berthier
- Successor: Alexandre Berthier
- Full name: Louis Philippe Marie Alexandre Berthier
- Born: 24 March 1836; Paris
- Died: 15 July 1911 (aged 75); Château de Grosbois
- Buried: Château de Grosbois
- Noble family: Berthier
- Spouse: Bertha Clara von Rothschild
- Issue: Alexandre Berthier, 4th Prince of Wagram; Elisabeth Berthier; Marguerite Berthier
- Father: Napoléon Alexandre Berthier, 2nd Prince of Wagram
- Mother: Zénaïde Françoise Clary

Louis Philippe Marie "Alexandre" Berthier, 3rd Prince of Wagram (24 March 1836, Paris – 15 July 1911, Château de Grosbois) was a French nobleman and prince of Wagram. He was the son of Napoléon Alexandre Berthier and Zénaïde Françoise Clary and grandson of Louis Alexandre Berthier, who had been Chief of Staff to Napoleon I.

== Marriage and family ==
On 24 March 1882 he married Bertha Clara von Rothschild (1862–1903), daughter of Mayer Carl von Rothschild. The couple had three children:

- Alexandre Louis Philippe Marie Berthier, 4th Prince of Wagram (1883 – 30 May 1918)
- Elisabeth Berthier de Wagram, (1885–1960), married Prince Henri de La Tour d'Auvergne-Lauraguais (1876–1914)
- Marguerite Berthier de Wagram, (5 Dec 1887 – 25 Jun 1966), married Prince Jacques de Broglie (1878–1974)
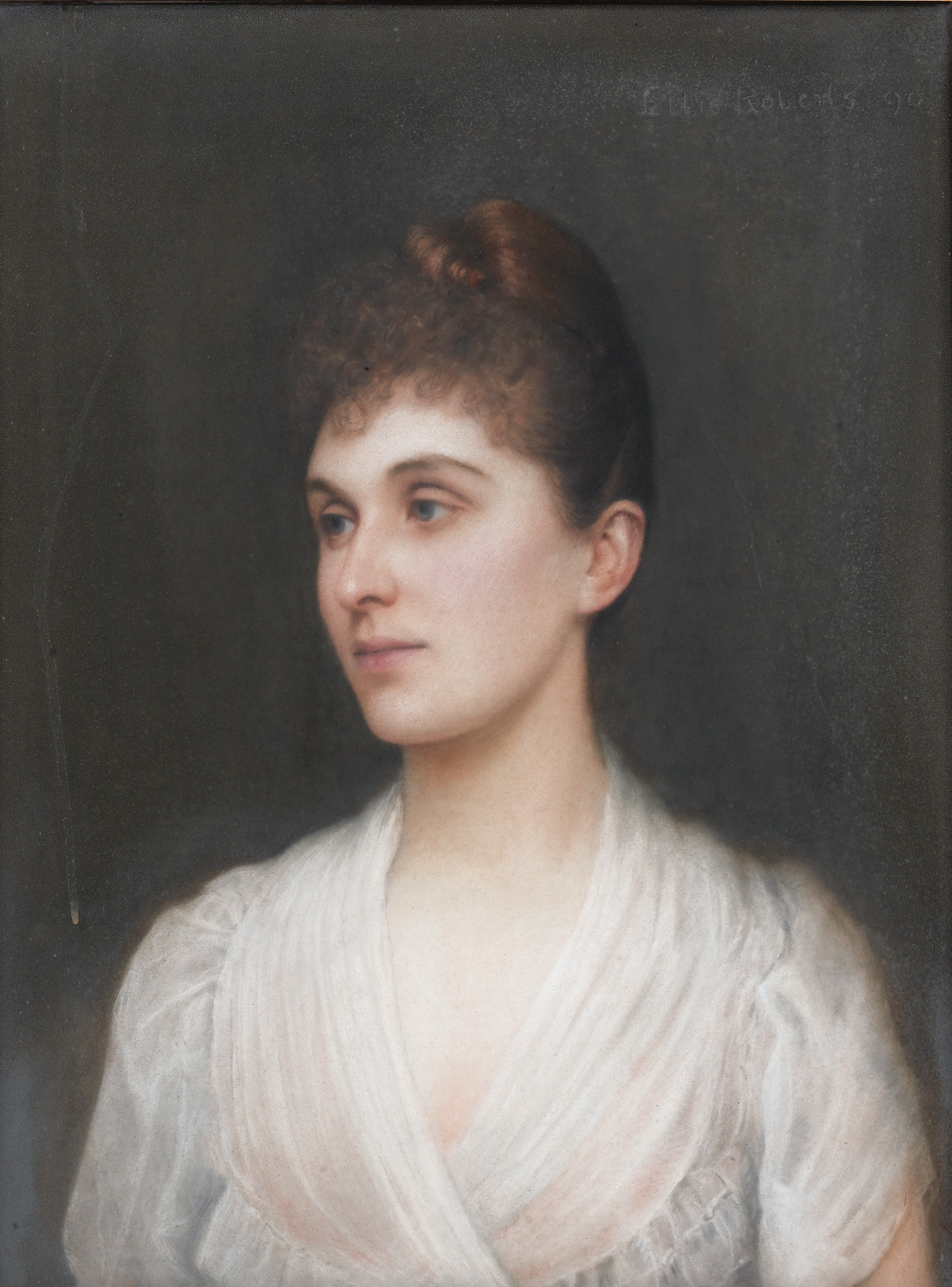
  Bertha-Clara von Rothschild (Ellis William Roberts, 1890)

The 2nd, the 3rd and the 4th Prince of Wagram are buried at the Château de Grosbois.

== Ancestry ==
Ancestors of Alexandre Berthier, 3rd Prince of Wagram

16. Michel Berthier
8. Jean-Baptiste Berthier
17. Jeanne Dumez
4. Louis-Alexandre Berthier, 1st Prince of Wagram, Sovereign Prince of Neuchâtel
18. César Alexandre L'Huillier de La Serre
9. Marie Françoise L'Huillier de La Serre
19. Barbe-Françoise de Marne
2. Napoléon Alexandre Berthier, 2nd Prince of Wagram
20. John, Count Palatine of Gelnhausen
10. Duke Wilhelm in Bavaria
21. Wild- and Rhinegravine Sophie Charlotte of Salm-Dhaun
5. Duchess Maria Elisabeth in Bavaria
22. Frederick Michael, Count Palatine of Zweibrücken
11. Countess Palatine Maria Anna of Zweibrücken-Birkenfeld
23. Countess Palatine Maria Franziska of Sulzbach
1. Alexandre Berthier, 3rd Prince of Wagram
24. Joseph Clary
12. François Clary
25. Françoise Agnès Ammoric
6. Joseph Nicolas Clary, 1st Count Clary
26. Joseph Ignace Somis
13. Françoise Rose Somis
27. Catherine Rose Soucheiron
3. Zénaïde Françoise Clary
28. Claude François Rouyer
14. Marie François Rouyer, Baron Rouyer
29. Marie Anne Gouzot
7. Anne Jeanne Rouyer
15. Sophie Thérèse Claudine Grand
