= Napoléon Alexandre Berthier, 2nd Prince of Wagram =

French politician and nobleman

Napoléon Alexandre Berthier
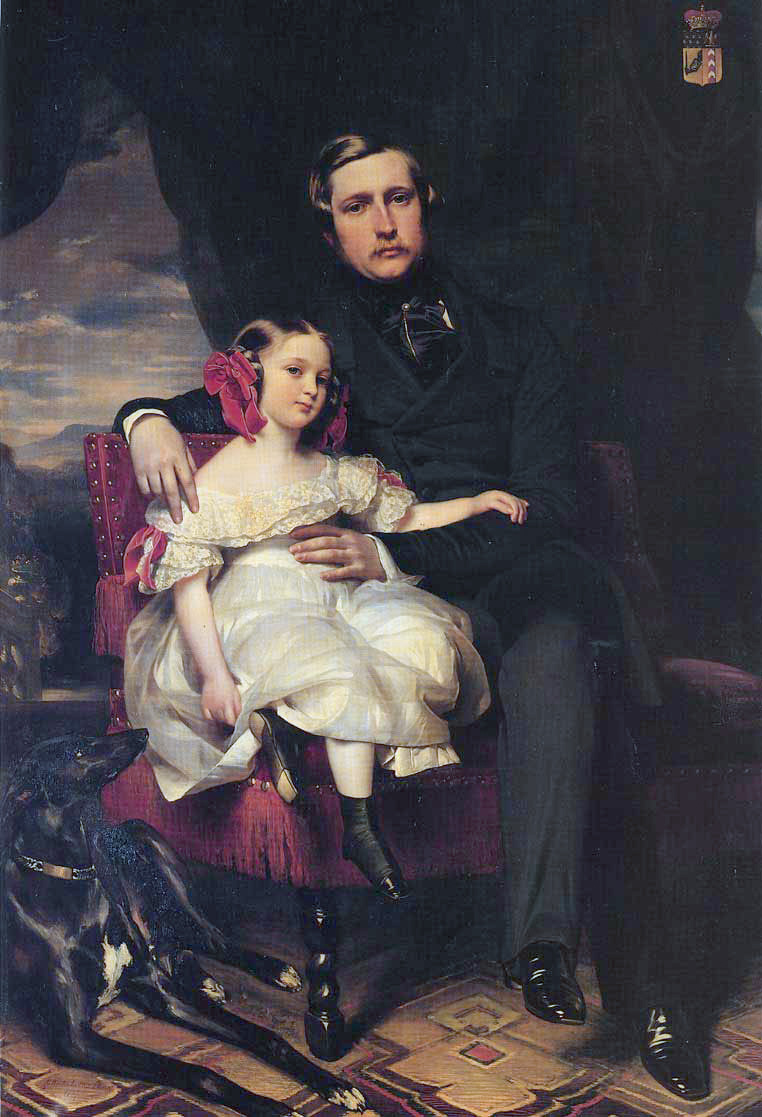
- The prince de Wagram and his daughter Malcy by Winterhalter.

2nd Prince of Wagram
- Tenure: 1 June 1815 - 10 February 1887
- Predecessor: Louis-Alexandre Berthier
- Successor: Alexandre Berthier
- Born: 11 September 1810; Paris
- Died: 10 February 1887 (aged 76); Paris
- Noble family: Berthier
- Spouse: Zénaïde Françoise Clary (m. 1834; died 1884)
- Issue: Malcy Louise Caroline Frédérique Berthier, Princess of Wagram; Alexandre Berthier, 3rd Prince of Wagram; Elisabeth Alexandrine Maria Berthier, Princess of Wagram
- Father: Louis-Alexandre Berthier, 1st Prince of Wagram
- Mother: Duchess Maria Elisabeth in Bavaria

Napoléon Alexandre Louis Joseph Berthier, 2nd Prince of Wagram (11 September 1810, Paris – 10 February 1887, Paris) was a French politician and nobleman. He was the son of Louis-Alexandre Berthier, 1st Prince of Wagram, and Duchess Maria Elisabeth in Bavaria (and by his mother, grandnephew of King Maximilian I of Bavaria).

== Marriage and family ==
On 29 June 1831, he married Zénaïde Françoise Clary (25 November 1812, Paris – 27 April 1884, Paris). She was the daughter of Nicolas Joseph Clary and Malcy Anne Jeanne Rougier. She was also the niece of Désirée Clary, former fiancée to Napoleon Bonaparte and the wife of Jean-Baptiste Bernadotte - King Charles XIV of Sweden.

They had three children:

- Malcy Louise Caroline Frédérique Berthier, Princess of Wagram (1832–1884), who married Joachim, 4th Prince Murat. Malcy and Joachim were the parents of Joachim, 5th Prince Murat.
- Louis Philippe Marie Alexandre Berthier, 3rd Prince of Wagram (1836–1911)
- Elisabeth Alexandrine Maria Berthier, Princess of Wagram (1849–1932), who married Count Étienne-Guy de Turenne d'Aynac.

The 2nd, the 3rd and the 4th Prince of Wagram are buried at the Château de Grosbois.

== Ancestry ==
Ancestors of Napoléon Alexandre Berthier, 2nd Prince of Wagram

8. Michel Berthier
4. Jean-Baptiste Berthier
9. Jeanne Dumez
2. Louis-Alexandre Berthier, 1st Prince of Wagram, Sovereign Prince of Neuchâtel
10. César Alexandre L'Huillier de La Serre
5. Marie Françoise L'Huillier de La Serre
11. Barbe-Françoise de Marne
1. Napoléon Alexandre Berthier, 2nd Prince of Wagram
12. John, Count Palatine of Gelnhausen
6. Duke Wilhelm in Bavaria
13. Wild- and Rhinegravine Sophie Charlotte of Salm-Dhaun
3. Duchess Maria Elisabeth in Bavaria
14. Frederick Michael, Count Palatine of Zweibrücken
7. Countess Palatine Maria Anna of Zweibrücken-Birkenfeld
15. Countess Palatine Maria Franziska of Sulzbach

== Bibliography ==
- "Napoléon Alexandre Berthier, 2nd Prince of Wagram", in Adolphe Robert and Gaston Cougny, Dictionnaire des parlementaires français (1789–1891), Bourloton, Paris, 1889 Edition details Wikisource
