= César Berthier =

French Napoleonic War general

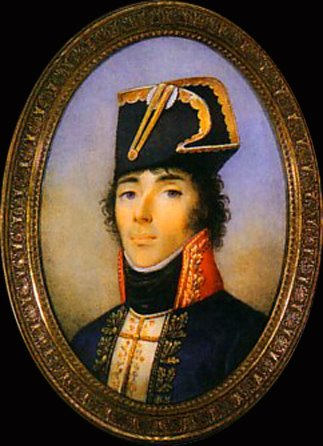
Portrait of Louis Cesar Berthier.

Louis César Gabriel Berthier de Berluy (French pronunciation: [lwi sezaʁ ɡabʁijɛl bɛʁtje də bɛʁlɥi]; 9 November 1765 Versailles – 17 August 1819 Château de Grosbois (Seine-et-Oise)), was a French Napoleonic War general.

== Early life ==
He was the son of Jean-Baptiste Berthier (1721-1804), an engineer and lieutenant-colonel ennobled by Louis XV, and a brother of Louis-Alexandre Berthier the Empire maréchal, the division general Victor Léopold Berthier, and maréchal de camp Joseph-Alexandre Berthier, 1st Viscount Berthier (1821).

César was born on 9 November 1765, at 3, rue de l’Indépendance américaine, in Saint-Louis parish, at Versailles, and was baptised on 20 November.

== Career ==
After the coup of 18 Brumaire in Year VIII (9 November 1799) he was appointed inspector of reviews. At Marengo on 25 Prairial in the year VIII (14 June 1800), he was made adjutant to Joachim Murat, commander of the cavalry. Promoted to Brigadier General on September 4, 1802, he succeeded his brother Victor Léopold Berthier the following year as chief of staff in Paris, the latter being called to leave for Germany.

He was made a commander in the Legion of Honor on 14 January 1804, and in 1805 he obtained the command of an army of observation on the coast of Holland. He became a division general on 3 January 1806.

== At Corfu ==
The Septinsular Republic was ceded by Russia to France as part of the Treaties of Tilsit in 1807. In August 1807, Berthier arrived in Corfu from Taranto with 4,000 men of the 5th Italian Regiment of the Line, the 6th French Regiment of the Line, two artillery companies, two companies of sappers, supplies and ammunition. The Ionian Islands were occupied by the 4th Light.

Berthier announced on 1 September at the Septinsular Senate that the Ionian Islands were annexed to France.

When he became "commander of Corfu," Caesar Berthier settled in the Fortezza Vecchia, in the building occupied before him by Venetian provveditores, general Antoine Gentili and Louis François Jean Chabot, then before that Sebastiano Mocenigo. Although Napoleon promised that the Seven Islands would retain their independence, Berthier hoisted the French flag over the citadel, which was not seen as an encouraging sign by the local population.

On March 28, 1808, he was replaced by his former assistant, François-Xavier Donzelot.

== End of the empire and restoration ==
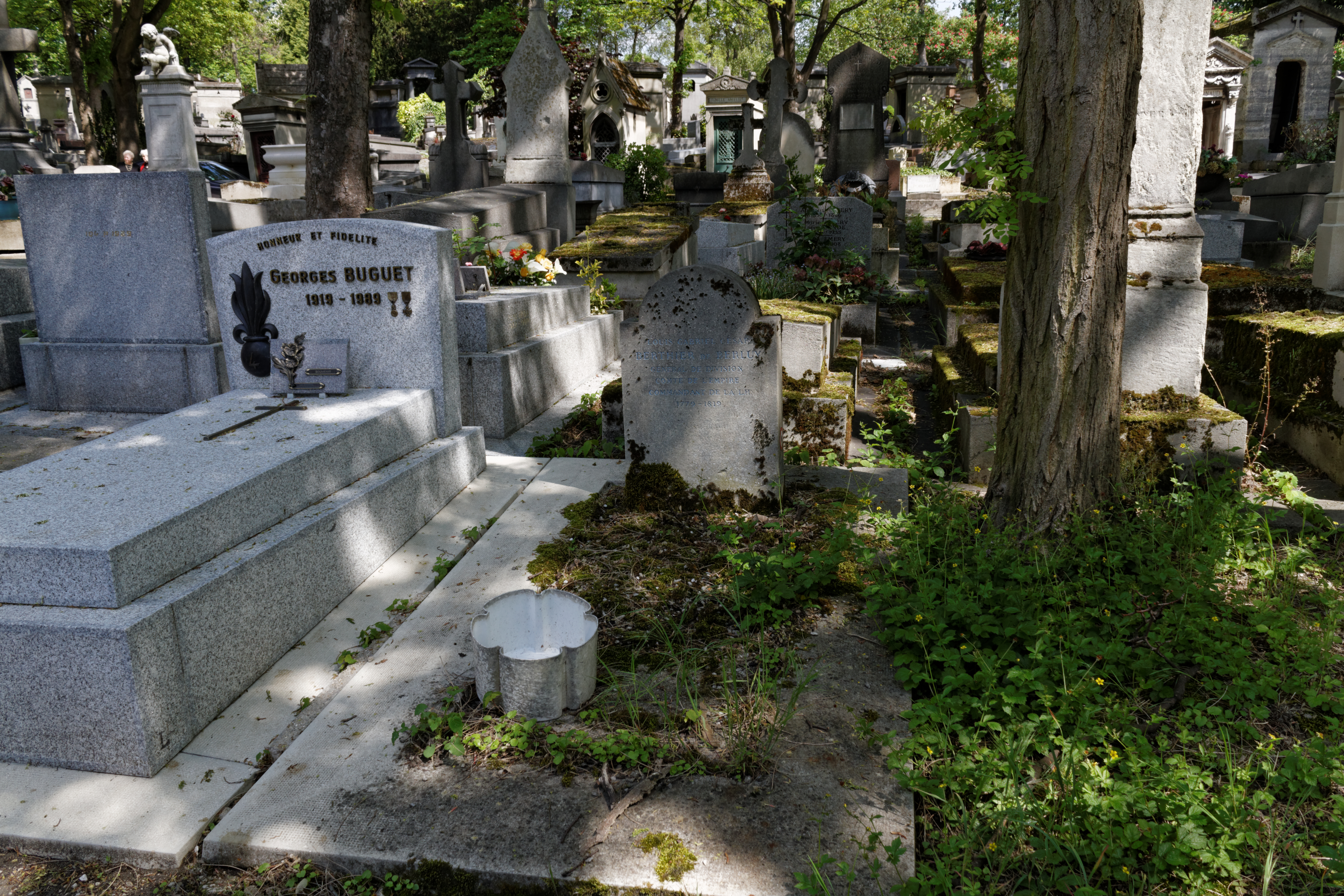
Tomb at the Père Lachaise Cemetery

He commanded the 27th military division in Turin (1808-1811) and the 23rd Military Division in Corsica (1811-1814).

Also in Italy he was appointed head of the house of Pope Pius VII, who was being held prisoner in Savona by Napoleon (1809-1814). He was then governor of Piedmont replacing General Jacques-François Menou.

He was made a knight of the Order of the Lion "Bavaria" and count of the Empire on February 13, 1813.

He rallied to the Bourbons in 1814. He was awarded the Cross of St. Louis on 24 October 1814. In 1819 he was assigned the rank of lieutenant general in the infantry's General Inspectorate.

But on 17 August 1819, while visiting the Castle of Grosbois near Boissy-Saint-Léger, the country house of his sister-in-law Duchess Maria Elisabeth in Bavaria, Princess of Neufchatel and Wagram, he died accidentally (by drowning or struck with apoplexy) in a pond on the grounds of the castle.
