= Fort de Condé-sur-Aisne =

- Part of Séré de Rivières system
- France
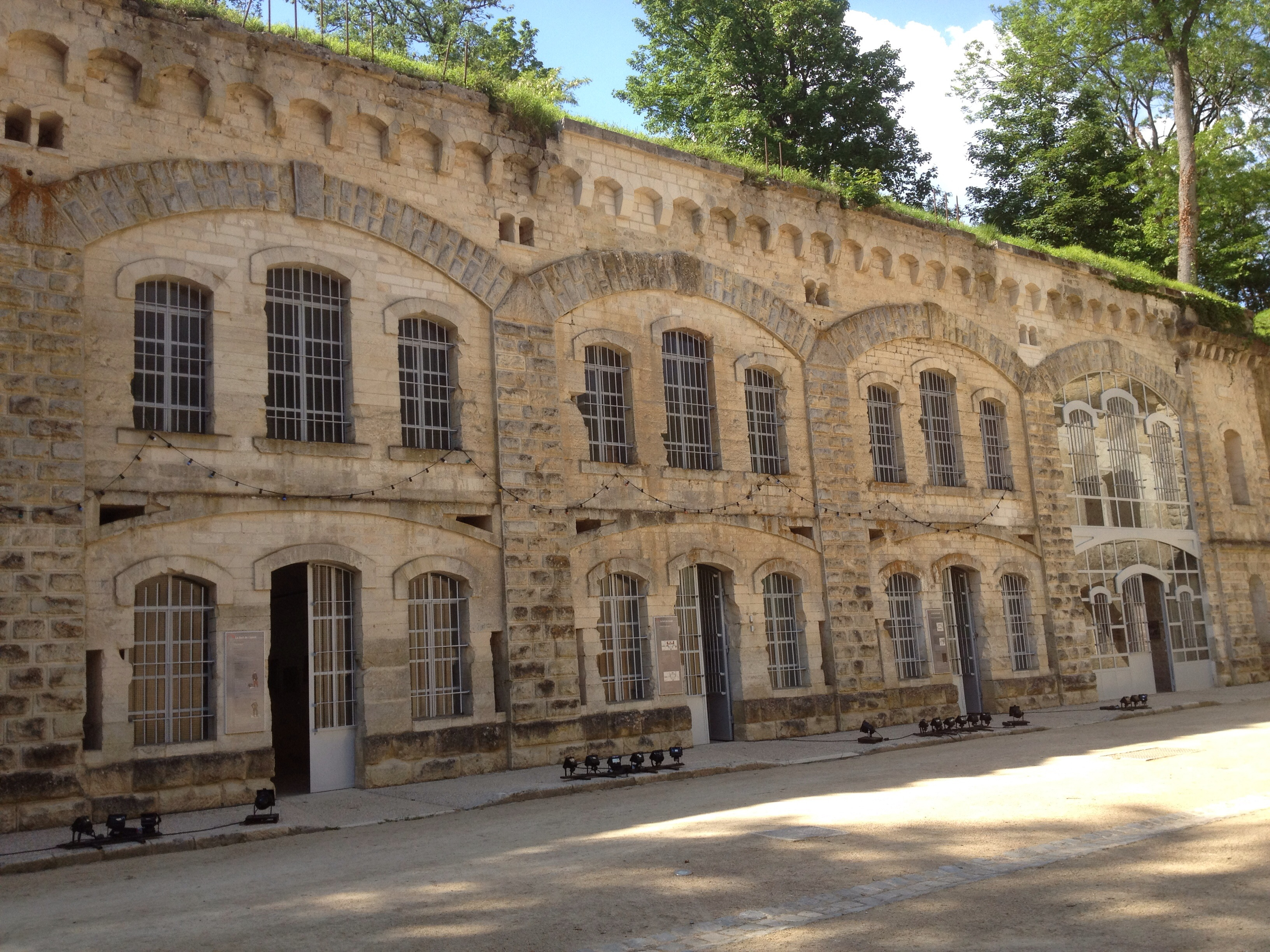

Site information
- Type: Fort
- Controlled by: France
- Open to the public: Yes
- Condition: Preserved

Location
- Coordinates: 49.401227°N 3.454°E

Site history
- Built: 1878
- Materials: Brick, stone

The Fort de Condé, or Fort Pille, is a fortification of the Séré de Rivières system, built in France between 1877 and 1883 to defend the area between Soissons and Laon. It is located on the heights of the confluence of the Aisne and the Vesle near the communes of Condé-sur-Aisne and Chivres-Val. Although the fort was considered obsolete at the start of World War I, its command of strategic ground made it a coveted objective throughout the war, changing hands several times. Following the war it was used in support service before its abandonment and purchase by a local community. It has been under preservation since 1979 and may be visited.

== Military function ==
The Fort de Condé comprised part of the outermost defenses fortifications that denied access to Paris for an invading force, one of several similar forts in the vicinity of Laon. These forts were constructed in response to the French defeat in the Franco-Prussian War, in which France lost its eastern provinces to Germany, forcing France to build new and updated frontier fortifications.

The Fort de Condé controlled the high ground along the Chemin des Dames, which linked Reims, Laon and Soissons, and could bombard the Aisne and Vesle valleys. The fort also provided support to the nearby Fort de la Malmaison.

== Description ==
The five-sided masonry fort was built by Dollot and Fortier at a cost of 1,850,000 francs-d'or. The fort covered 13 hectares (32 acres) and could accommodate almost 650 men and 20 officers. An infirmary for 80 invalids was also provided, as well as stabling for 12 horses, powder and ammunition magazines, a forge, a workshop and two wells. The fort featured two Mougin casemates mounting 155 mm guns, as well as an initial18 guns on the rampart and 8 guns in a separate battery. Two casemates in the main fort were planned to provide indirect fire. The fort is roughly pentagonal, and features two double caponiers and a single caponier. One of the double caponiers provides covering fire to the fort's entrance.

== History ==
In 1885 two companies of the French 67th Infantry Regiment (500 men) occupied the fort. Unfortunately, technological progress in explosives had overtaken fortress design and construction, and the fort was obsolete, insufficiently resistant to high-explosive artillery shells. The fort became a simple casernement for military personnel. The fort was abandoned in 1912 as a result of its functional obsolescence.

The fort's location close to the Chemin des Dames made the fort a coveted objective by both sides during the First World War. Captured without resistance by the Germans on 1 September 1914, the fort was recaptured by French and British forces on 15 September after several attacks, but was re-taken by the Germans in a counter-attack. The site was used as a German hospital until it was returned to France without opposition in the Chemin des Dames offensive on 16 April 1917. Generals Pershing and Franchet d’Espérey observed fighting along the Chemin des Dames from the post in October 1917. The fort was recaptured by the Germans on 28 May 1918 during the May offensive, and re-recaptured by France on 7 August 1918. It was finally decommissioned as a fortification in 1927.

The fort served as a center for the disassembly of explosive shells. On 18 December 1953, an accident inside the fort caused the death of three people: Gustave Rouxhet, Joseph Gronowski and Marceau Dagry. A commemorative plaque on the site recalls this event.

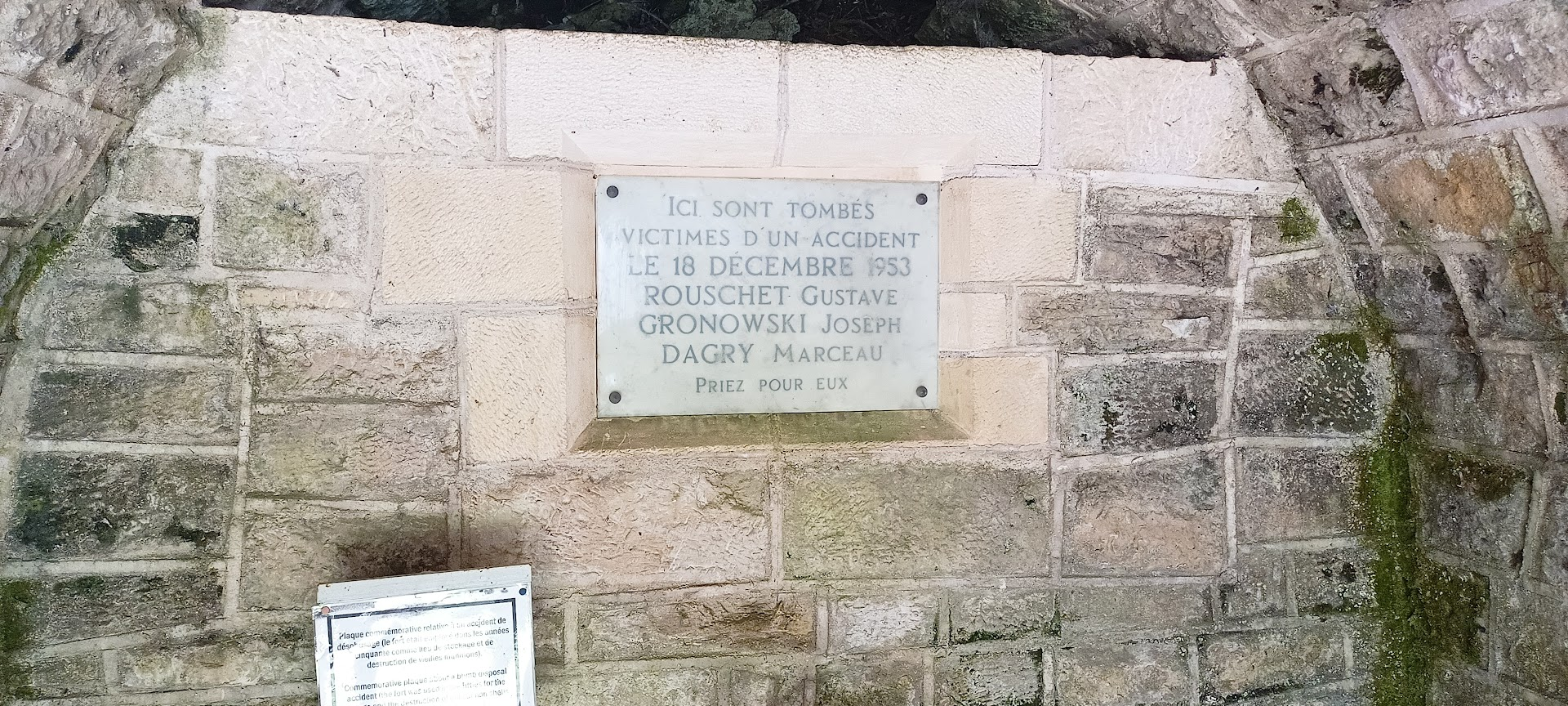
Commemorative plaque – Fort de Condé (Aisne)

The fort was purchased by the commune of Chivres-Val for use as a quarry in 1959.

An association to restore the fort was formed in 1979, handing over custody of the fort in 2000 to the Communauté de Communes du Val de l’Aisne which has undertaken restoration work. The site is used for exhibitions, theater and son et lumière shows. Since 2001 the Fort de Condé has been recorded on the French Inventaire Supplémentaire des Monuments Historiques.
