= Duke Pius August in Bavaria =

Pius August
- Duke of Bavaria
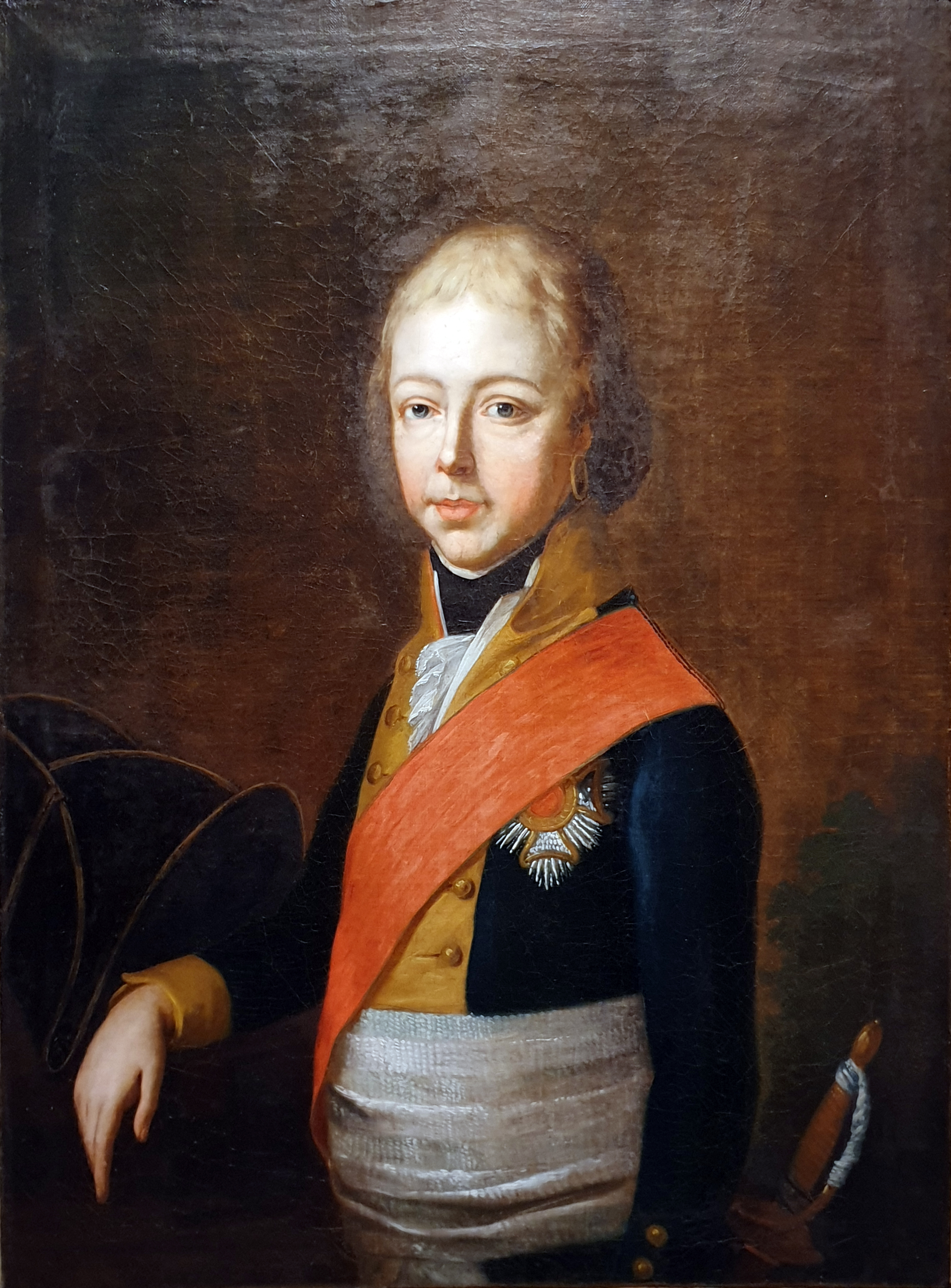
- 1800 portrait
- Born: 1 August 1786; Landshut, Electorate of Bavaria
- Died: 3 August 1837 (aged 51); Bayreuth, Kingdom of Bavaria
- Spouse: Princess Amélie Louise of Arenberg (m. 1807; died 1823)
- Issue: Duke Maximilian Joseph in Bavaria
- House: Wittelsbach
- Father: Duke Wilhelm in Bavaria
- Mother: Countess Palatine Maria Anna of Zweibrücken-Birkenfeld

Duke Pius August of Bavaria, full German name: Pius August Herzog in Bayern (1 August 1786 – 3 August 1837) was a Duke in Bavaria as a member of the Palatine Birkenfeld-Gelnhausen line of the House of Wittelsbach. He was the paternal grandfather of Empress Elisabeth of Austria through his son Duke Maximilian Joseph in Bavaria, as well as the great-grandfather of Queen Elisabeth of the Belgians and an ancestor of the current generations of the Belgian and Italian Royal Families and the Grand Ducal Family of Luxembourg.

== Early life ==
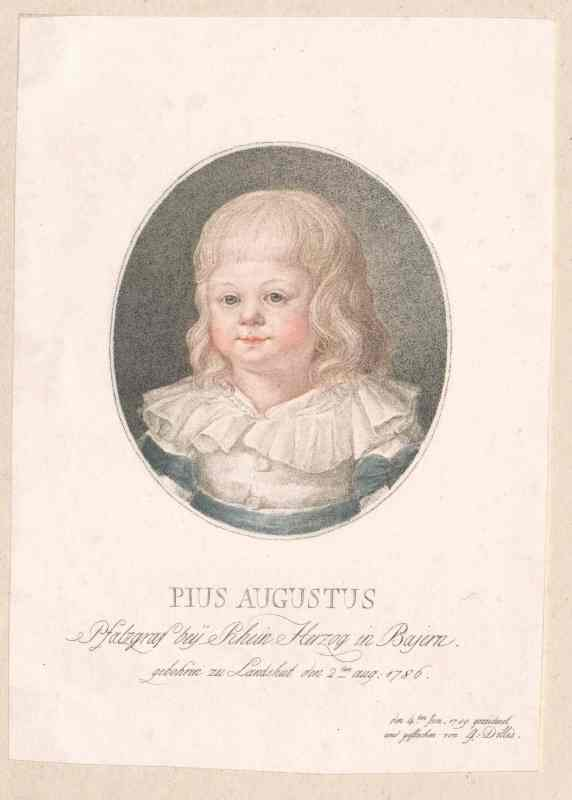
Pius August as a child

Pius August was born on 1 August 1786 in Landshut as the third child and eldest surviving son of the then Count Palatine Wilhelm of Birkenfeld-Gelnhausen and his wife, Countess Palatine Maria Anna of Zweibrücken-Birkenfeld. His father was a member of the non-reigning Palatinate-Birkenfeld-Gelnhausen line of the widely branched House of Wittelsbach, and his mother was a daughter of Count Palatine Frederick Michael of Zweibrücken-Birkenfeld-Bischweiler, and sister of Maximilian Joseph, later King of Bavaria.

== Marriage and issue ==
Pius August married Princess Amélie Louise of Arenberg, daughter of Prince Louis Marie of Arenberg and his wife, Marie Adélaïde Julie de Mailly-Nesle, Dame d'Ivry-sur-Seine, on 26 May 1807 in Brussels. Pius August and Amélie Louise had one son:

- Duke Maximilian Joseph in Bavaria (4 December 1808 – 15 November 1888)

== Later life ==
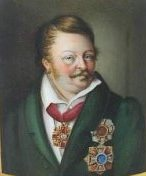
Duke Pius August in Bavaria

Duke Pius August was a major general in the royal Bavarian Army and commanded the 8th Infantry Regiment in Bayreuth. In 1815, Pius August became an honorary member of the Bavarian Academy of Sciences and Humanities. He loved to travel.

== Ancestry ==
Ancestors of Duke Pius August in Bavaria

8. John Charles, Count Palatine of Gelnhausen
4. John, Count Palatine of Gelnhausen
9. Esther Maria von Witzleben
2. Duke Wilhelm in Bavaria
10. Charles, Wild- and Rhinegrave of Salm-Dhaun
5. Wild- and Rhinegravine Sophie Charlotte of Salm-Dhaun
11. Countess Louise of Nassau-Ottweiler
1. Duke Pius August in Bavaria
12. Christian III, Count Palatine of Zweibrücken
6. Frederick Michael, Count Palatine of Zweibrücken
13. Countess Caroline of Nassau-Saarbrücken
3. Countess Palatine Maria Anna of Zweibrücken-Birkenfeld
14. Joseph Charles, Hereditary Prince of Sulzbach
7. Countess Palatine Maria Franziska of Sulzbach
15. Countess Palatine Elisabeth Auguste Sofie of Neuburg
