= Ellis William Roberts =

English painter

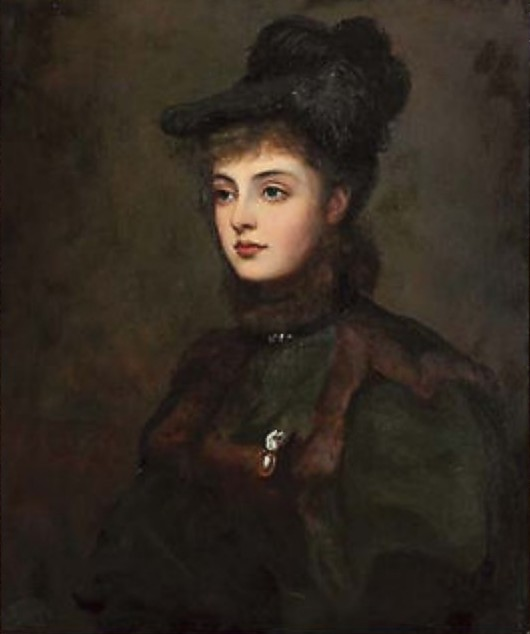
Lady Margaret Scott (1897) by Ellis William Roberts

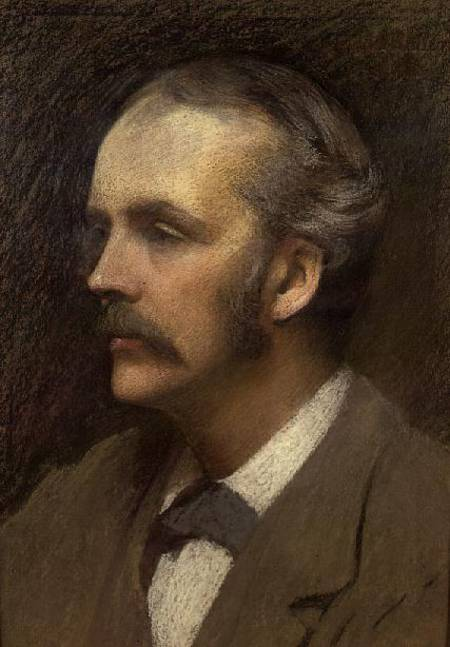
Arthur James Balfour (1892) by Ellis William Roberts

Ellis William Roberts (1860–1930) was an English portrait painter. He began his career as a painter of pottery at the Mintons factory in Stoke-on-Trent, then won a prize of thirty pounds. The prize enabled him to undertake two years of advanced training in South Kensington, London, at what is now the Royal College of Art. There he was given a travelling studentship, and he set himself up as a painter. By the early 1900s he was well-known for his portraits of the beautiful women and girls of London society.

Two of his paintings are in the collection of the Potteries Museum & Art Gallery, Stoke-on-Trent, while several are in the possession of the National Trust.

His paintings are today regarded as smooth and rather bland; many at the time also felt so, including George Moore, the novelist and critic, who delivered a hostile assessment in 1896.
