= Chivres-Val =

- Commune
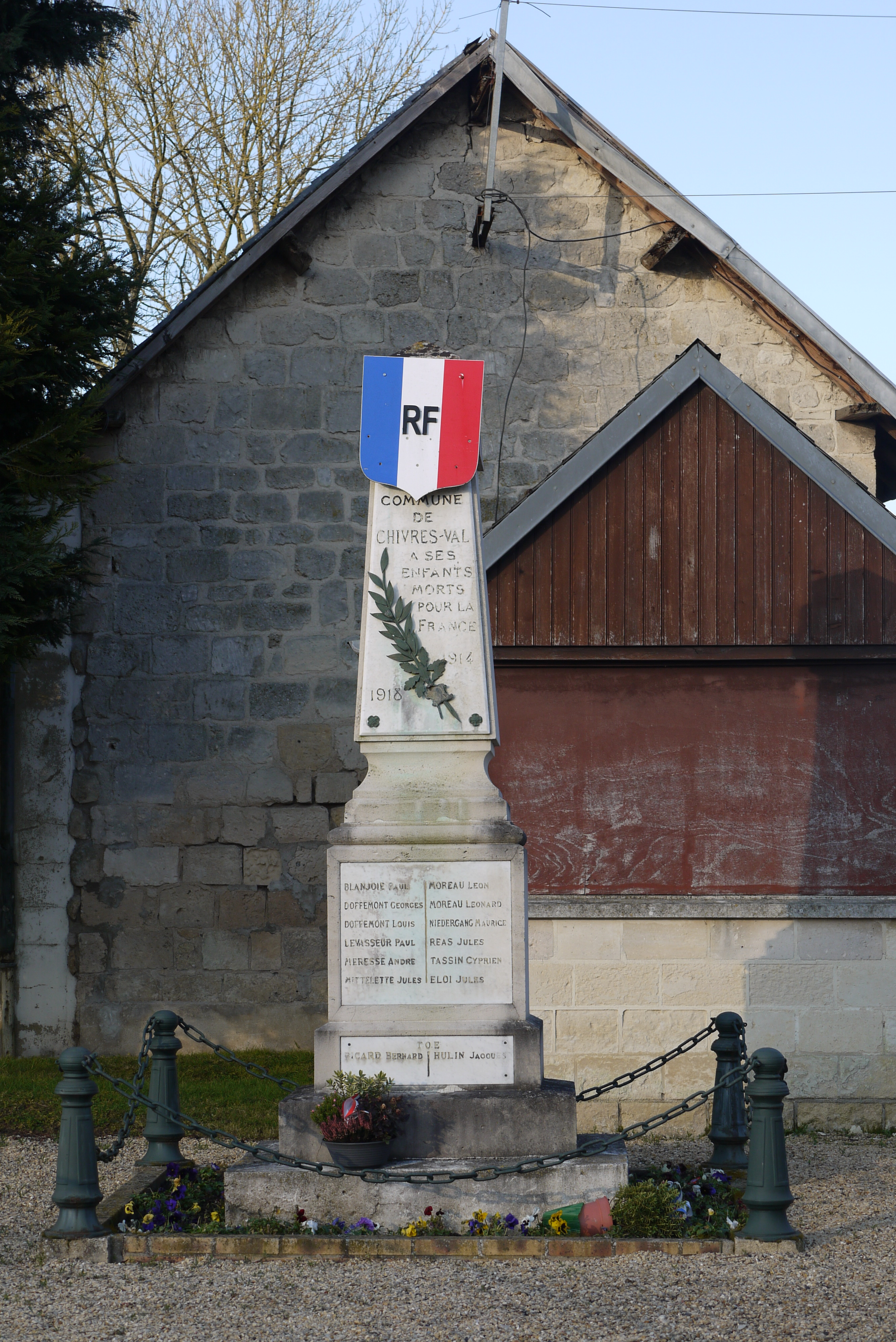
- The monument to the dead of Chivres-Val
- Location of Chivres-Val
- Location within France Location within Hauts-de-France
- Coordinates: 49°23′46″N 3°26′10″E
- Country: France
- Region: Hauts-de-France
- Department: Aisne
- Arrondissement: Soissons
- Canton: Fère-en-Tardenois
- Intercommunality: Val de l'Aisne

Government
  - Mayor (2026–32): Romuald Demottier
- Area^{1}: 5.54 km^{2} (2.14 sq mi)
- Elevation: 90 m (300 ft)
- Highest elevation: 168 m (551 ft)
- Lowest elevation: 54 m (177 ft)
- Population (2023): 526
  - Density: 94.9/km^{2} (246/sq mi)
- Time zone: UTC+01:00 (CET)
  - Summer (DST): UTC+02:00 (CEST)
- INSEE/Postal code: 02190 /02880
- ^{1} French Land Register data, which excludes lakes, ponds, glaciers > 1 km^{2} (0.386 sq mi or 247 acres) and river estuaries.

Chivres-Val (French pronunciation: [ʃivʁ val]) is a commune in the Aisne department in Hauts-de-France in northern France.

== Population ==
Historical population
Year	Pop.	±% p.a.
1968	385	—
1975	471	+2.92%
1982	501	+0.89%
1990	596	+2.19%
1999	575	−0.40%
2007	588	+0.28%
2012	586	−0.07%
2017	530	−1.99%
2023	526	−0.13%
Source: INSEE

== See also ==
- Communes of the Aisne department
