= Louis-Alexandre Berthier =

French general and politician (1753–1815)

Marshal of the Empire Louis-Alexandre Berthier Prince of Neuchâtel and Valangin, Prince of Wagram
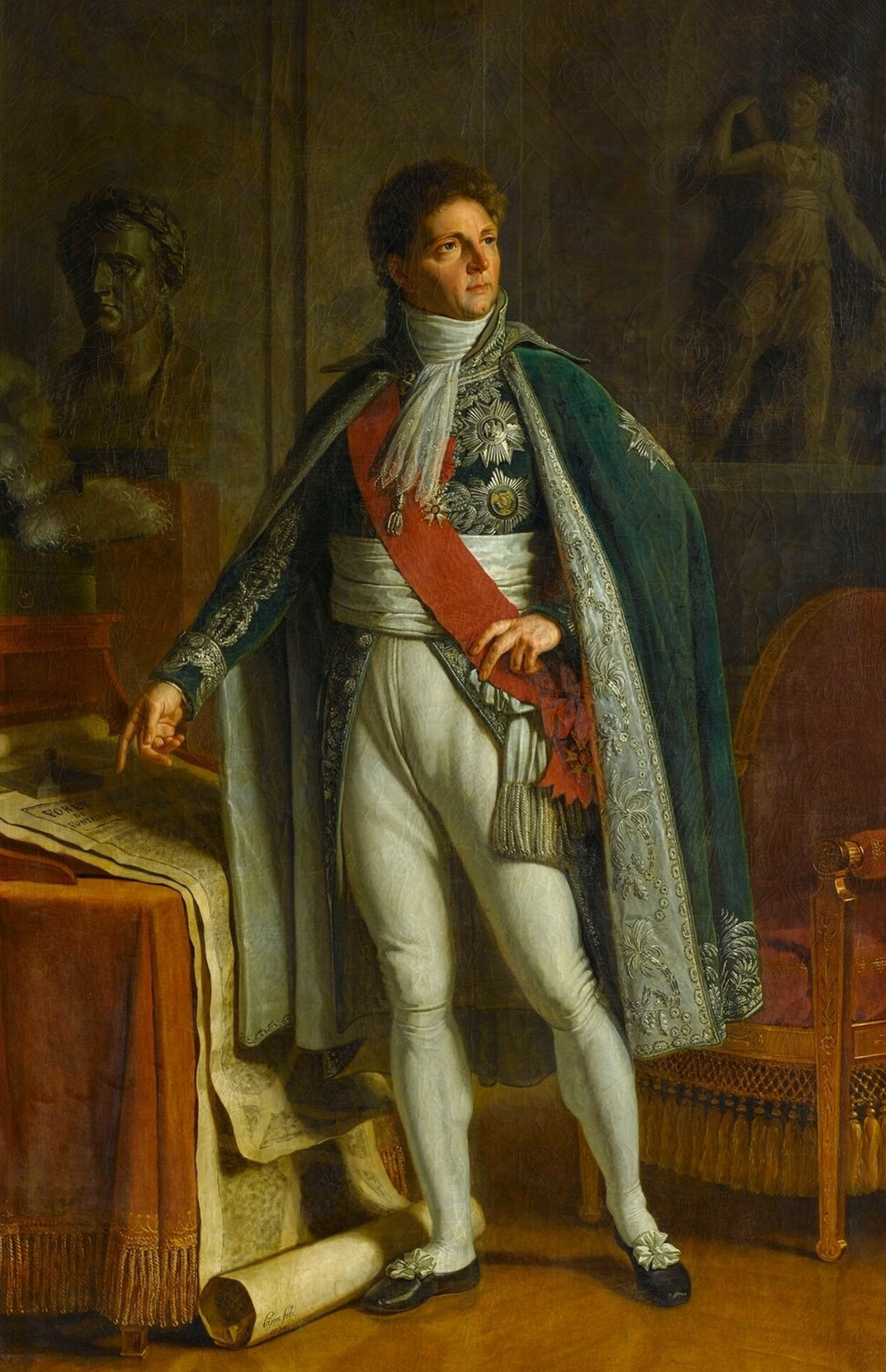
- Portrait by Jacques Pajou, 1808

Minister of War
- In office 11 November 1799 – 2 April 1800
- Preceded by: Edmond Louis Alexis Dubois-Crancé
- Succeeded by: Lazare Carnot
- In office 8 October 1800 – 19 August 1807
- Preceded by: Lazare Carnot
- Succeeded by: Henri Guillaume Clarke, Duke of Feltre

Sovereign Prince of Neuchâtel and Valangin
- In office 25 February 1806 – 3 June 1814
- Preceded by: Frederick William III of Prussia
- Succeeded by: Frederick William III of Prussia

Personal details
- Born: 20 November 1753 Versailles, Kingdom of France
- Died: 1 June 1815 (aged 61) Bamberg, Kingdom of Bavaria
- Spouse: Maria Elisabeth (m. 1808)
- Relations: César Berthier (brother)
- Children: 3, including Napoléon Alexandre
- Parent: Jean-Baptiste Berthier (father)
- Awards: Grand Cross of the Legion of Honour; Commander of the Order of Saint Louis; Vice-Grand Constable of France

Military service
- Allegiance: Kingdom of France; Kingdom of the French; French First Republic; First French Empire; Kingdom of France (Bourbon)
- Branch/service: Army
- Years of service: 1764–1815
- Rank: Marshal of the Empire
- Battles/wars: American Revolutionary War; French Revolutionary Wars; War of the First Coalition; Italian campaigns of the French Revolutionary Wars; Battle of Lodi; Battle of Rivoli; War of the Second Coalition; Battle of Marengo; Napoleonic Wars; War of the Third Coalition; Battle of Austerlitz; War of the Fourth Coalition; Battle of Jena-Auerstedt; Battle of Friedland; Peninsular War; French invasion of Russia; War of the Sixth Coalition

Louis-Alexandre Berthier, prince de Neuchâtel et Valangin, prince de Wagram (English: /ˈbɜːrtieɪ/ BUR-tee-ay, French: [lwi alɛksɑ̃dʁ bɛʁtje]; 20 November 1753 – 1 June 1815) was a French military commander who served during the French Revolutionary Wars and the Napoleonic Wars. He was twice Minister of War of France and was made a Marshal of the Empire in 1804. Berthier served as chief of staff to Napoleon Bonaparte from his first Italian campaign in 1796 until his first abdication in 1814. The operational efficiency of the Grande Armée owed much to his considerable administrative and organizational skills.

Born into a military family, Berthier served in the American Revolutionary War and survived suspicion of monarchism during the Reign of Terror before a rapid rise in the ranks of the French Revolutionary Army. Although a key supporter of the coup against the Directory that gave Napoleon supreme power, and present for his greatest victories, Berthier strongly opposed the progressive stretching of lines of communication during the Russian campaign. Allowed to retire by the restored Bourbon regime, he died by either suicide or murder shortly before the Battle of Waterloo. Berthier's reputation as a superb operational organiser remains strong among current historians.

== Early life ==
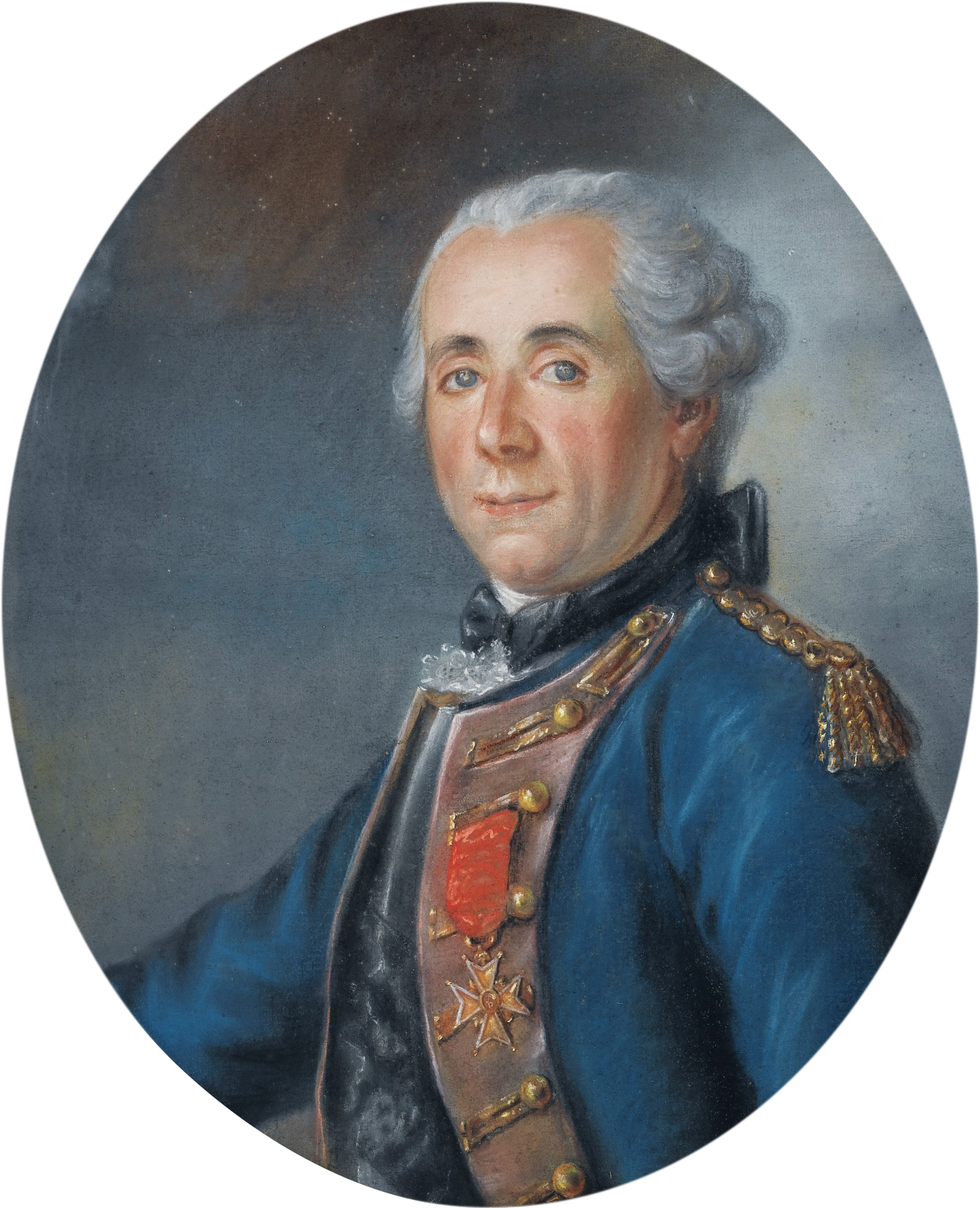
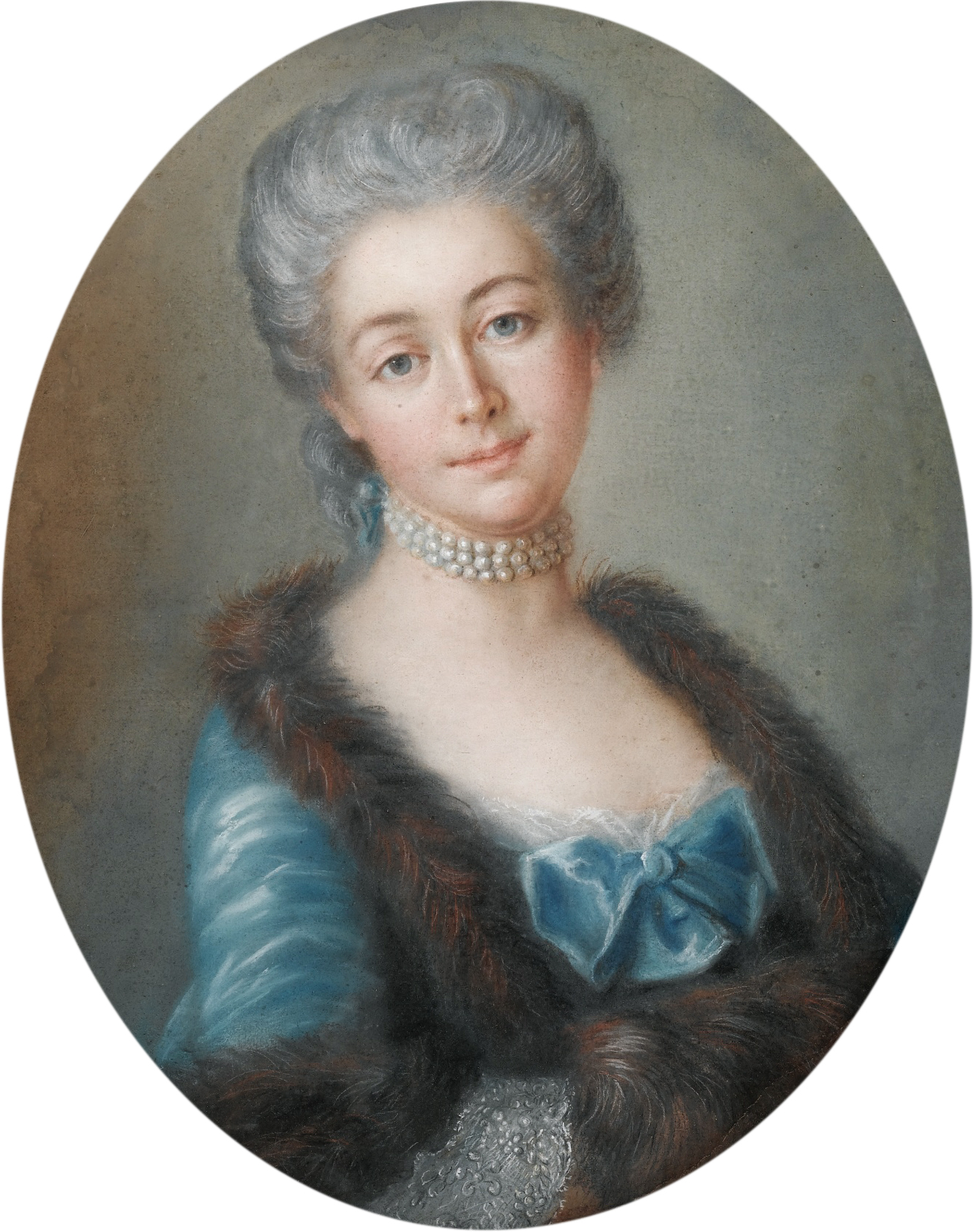
Berthier's parents: Jean-Baptiste Berthier and Marie Françoise L'Huillier de La Serre

Berthier was born in Versailles on 20 November 1753. He was the eldest of five surviving children of Lieutenant-Colonel Jean-Baptiste Berthier (1721–1804), an officer in the Corps of Topographical Engineers, and his first wife (married in 1746) Marie Françoise L'Huillier de La Serre. Three of his brothers also served in the French Army, with two, César (1765–1819) and Victor-Léopold (1770–1807), becoming generals during the Napoleonic Wars.

== Early career ==
As a boy, Berthier was instructed in the military art by his father, an officer of the Corps de genie (Engineer Corps). In 1764 he was admitted to the Royal Engineering School of Mézières, as a second lieutenant, graduating as a topographical engineer two years later, at the age of 12. In March 1772, Berthier entered the army as a lieutenant in the Flanders Legion. He then joined the Prince of Lambesc's Lorraine Dragoon Regiment in August 1776, and was promoted to captain in June 1777.

Berthier first saw action during the American Revolutionary War, in which he served from 1780 to 1783 as a staff officer under Jean-Baptiste Donatien de Vimeur, Count of Rochambeau. On his return, having attained the rank of colonel, he was employed in various staff posts and was made a Knight of Saint Louis in 1788. In July 1789, at the start of the French Revolution, Berthier was made a lieutenant-colonel as well as chief of staff of the Versailles National Guard, and in this role protected King Louis XVI's family from popular violence. In 1791, he aided in the emigration of the king's aunts Victoire and Adélaïde.

== French Revolutionary Wars ==
In 1792, Berthier was promoted to maréchal de camp and posted to the Army of the North. He was appointed chief of staff to Marshal Nicolas Luckner, and played a distinguished part in the Argonne campaign of Generals Dumouriez and Kellermann. He served with great credit in the War in the Vendée of 1793–1796. Berthier was made a brigade general in March 1795 and a general of division three months later.

Berthier first met Napoleon Bonaparte, when he was a general in March 1796, and was at once made chief of staff to the Army of Italy, which Bonaparte had recently been appointed to command. He served in the Italian campaign of 1796, distinguishing himself at the Battle of Lodi. In January 1797 he played an important role in the Battle of Rivoli, relieving General Joubert when the latter was attacked by the Austrian general Jozsef Alvinczi. His power of work, accuracy and quick comprehension, combined with his long and varied experience and his complete mastery of detail, made Berthier the ideal chief of staff. In this capacity, Berthier was Napoleon's most valued assistant for the rest of his career.

Berthier accompanied Napoleon throughout the campaign of 1797, and was left in charge of the army after the Treaty of Campo Formio. He was in this post in 1798 when he entered Italy, invaded the Vatican, organized the Roman Republic, and took Pope Pius VI prisoner. Berthier supervised the Pope's relocation to Valence, where, after a tortuous journey, Pius died. The death of the Pope dealt a major blow to the Vatican's political power.

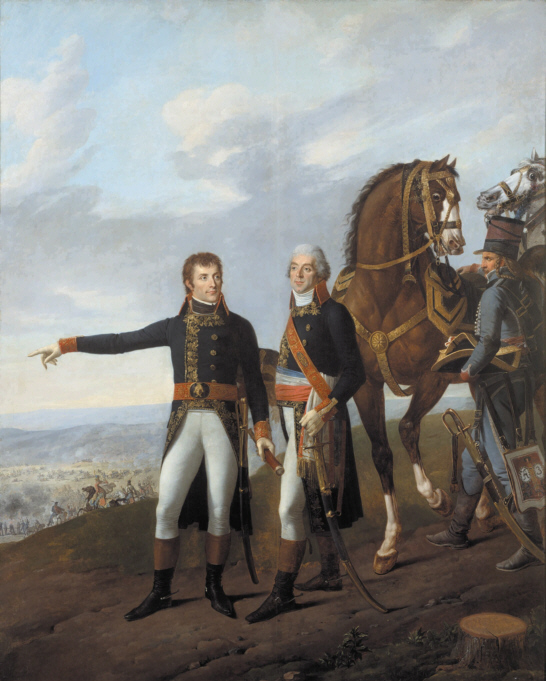
General Bonaparte and his chief of staff General Berthier at the Battle of Marengo, by Joseph Boze, 1800–1801

After this, Berthier joined his chief in Egypt, serving there until Napoleon's return. He assisted in the Coup of 18 Brumaire (9 November 1799), afterwards becoming Minister of War for a time. During the Battle of Marengo, Berthier was the nominal head of the Army of Reserve, but the First Consul accompanied the army and he acted in reality, as always, as chief of staff to Napoleon.

Despite serving as a staff officer, Berthier had at one point received a battlefield injury. A contemporary subordinate staff officer, Brossier, reports that at the Battle of Marengo:

The General-in-Chief Berthier gave his orders with the precision of a consummate warrior, and at Marengo maintained the reputation that he so rightly acquired in Italy and in Egypt under the orders of Bonaparte. He himself was hit by a bullet in the arm. Two of his aides-de-camp, Dutaillis and La Borde, had their horses killed.

At the close of the campaign, he was employed in civil and diplomatic business. This included a mission to Spain in August 1800, which resulted in the retrocession of Louisiana to France by the Treaty of San Ildefonso on 1 October 1800, and led to the Louisiana Purchase.

== Napoleonic Wars ==
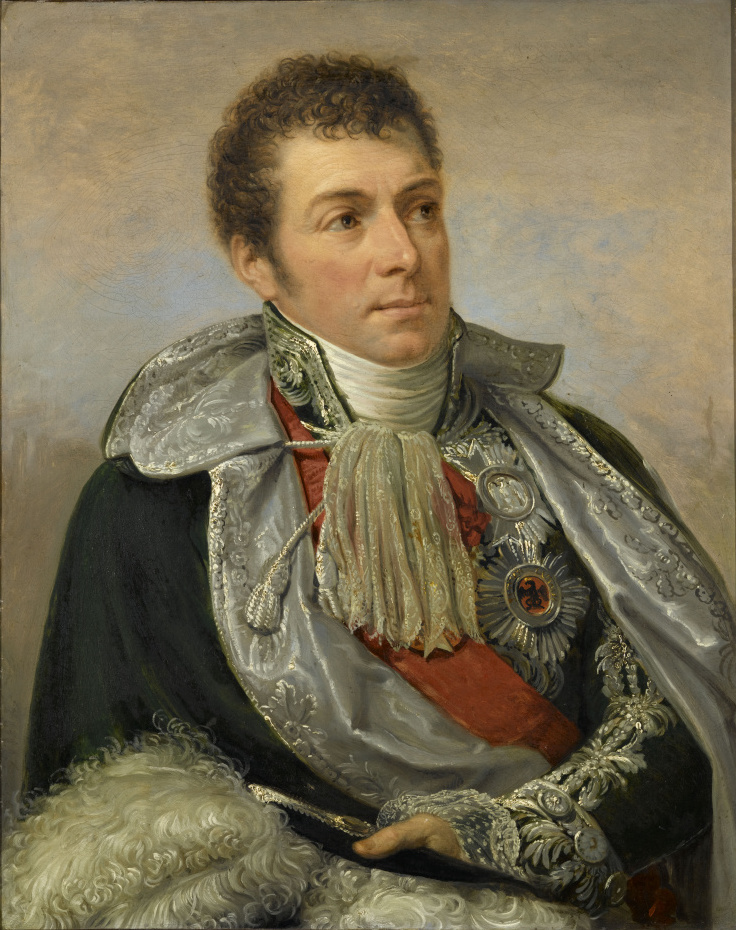
Portrait by Andrea Appiani

In May 1804, Napoleon became Emperor and at once made Berthier a Marshal of the Empire. He took part in the campaigns of Austerlitz, Jena, and Friedland. Berthier was made Grand Huntsman in 1804 and Vice-Constable of the Empire in 1807. In 1806, when Napoleon deposed King Frederick William III of Prussia from the Principality of Neuchâtel (now the Swiss canton of Neuchâtel), Berthier was appointed its ruler, with the title of Prince of Neuchâtel and Duke of Valangin. This lasted until his abdication on 3 June 1814. Berthier never visited Neuchâtel, where he was represented by a governor, although he was well acquainted with its affairs.

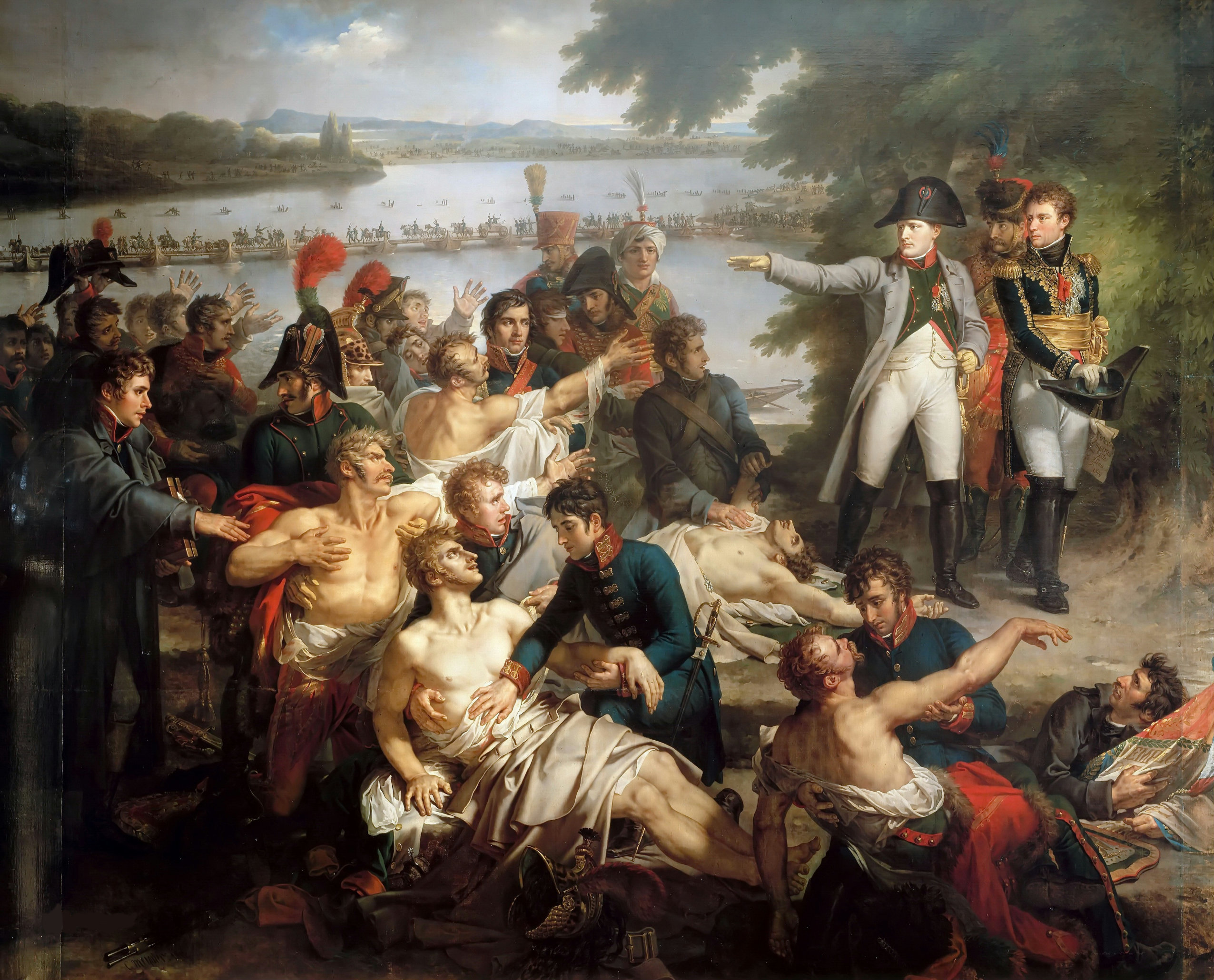
Napoleon's Return to the Island of Lobau After the Battle of Essling by Charles Meynier, 1812. Berthier is shown alongside Napoleon.

In 1808, Berthier served in the Peninsular War, and in 1809, served in the Austrian theatre during the War of the Fifth Coalition, after which he was given the victory title of Prince of Wagram. He was with Napoleon in Russia in 1812, and took part in the extremely unusual council of war on whether to proceed, being one of several who advised against an advance on Moscow which Napoleon had decided on, encouraged by Joachim Murat who was blamed by many for the horse-killing pace of the march into Russia. Berthier is said to have burst into tears at the decision. He served in Germany in 1813, and in north-east France in 1814, fulfilling, until the fall of the French Empire, the functions of chief of staff of the Grande Armée.

== Personal life ==
Coat of arms of Louis-Alexandre Berthier

In 1796, Berthier fell in love with Giuseppa Carcano, marquise Visconti di Borgorato, who was to be his mistress for the duration of the First French Empire, despite the emperor's disapproval. Even when Napoleon forced him to marry a Bavarian princess, the Duchess Maria Elisabeth, in 1808, Berthier managed to keep his mistress and his wife together under the same roof, a state of affairs which infuriated the emperor.

On 9 March 1808, Berthier married Elisabeth who was the only daughter of Duke Wilhelm in Bavaria and Countess Palatine Maria Anna of Zweibrücken-Birkenfeld-Rappoltstein, the sister of King Maximilian I Joseph of Bavaria, and a relative of the Russian emperor through the Wittelsbach line on the Bavarian side and Prussian (Mecklenburg) side of her lineage.

They had one son and two daughters:

- Napoléon-Alexandre, 2nd Duke and 2nd Prince of Wagram (11 September 1810 – 10 February 1887), married on 29 June 1831 to Zénaïde Françoise Clary (25 November 1812 – 27 April 1884). They had two daughters, Malcy Louise Caroline Frédérique Berthier Princess of Walgram (1832–1884), Elisabeth Alexandrine Maria Berthier Princess of Wagram (1849–1932) and a son, Louis Philippe Marie Alexandre Berthier, 3rd Prince of Wagram (1836–1911)
- Caroline-Joséphine, Princess of Wagram (22 August 1812 – 1905), married on 9 October 1832 to Alphonse Napoléon, Baron d'Hautpoul (29 May 1806 – 25 April 1889)
- Marie Anne Wilhelmine Alexandrine Elisabeth, Princess of Wagram (19 February 1816 – 23 July 1878). Born shortly after her father's death. Married on 24 June 1834 to Jules Lebrun, 3rd Duke of Plaisance (19 April 1811 – 15 January 1872)

== Later life ==
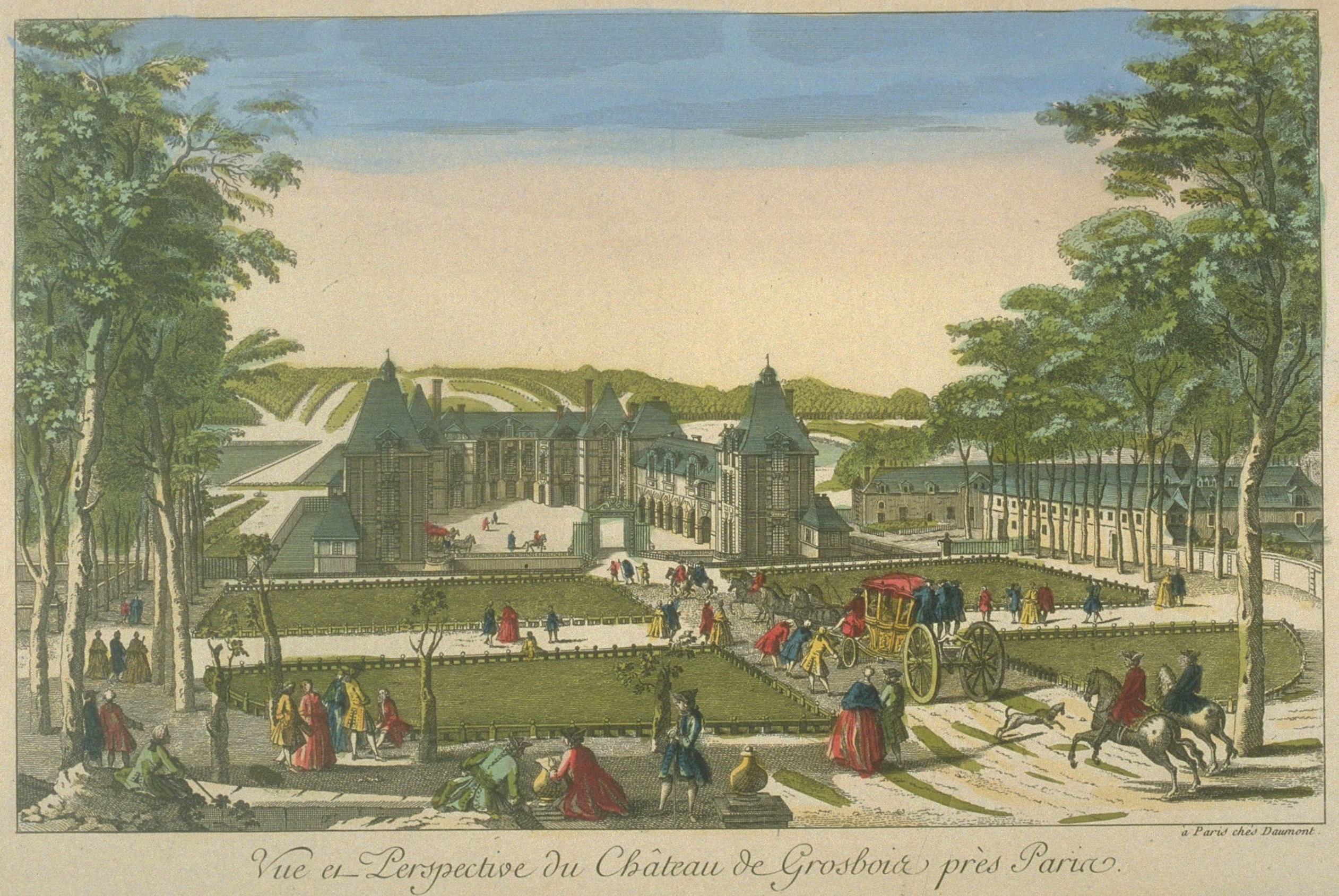
Berthier's estate Château de Grosbois in Val-de-Marne, France

Following Napoleon's first abdication, Berthier retired to Château de Grosbois, his 600-acre (2.4 km^{2}) estate at Boissy-Saint-Léger, Val-de-Marne. He made peace with King Louis XVIII in 1814 and accompanied the king on his solemn entry into Paris. During Napoleon's short exile on Elba, he informed Berthier of his projects. Berthier was much perplexed as to his future course and, being unwilling to commit to Napoleon, fell under the suspicion both of his old leader and of Louis XVIII.

== Death ==
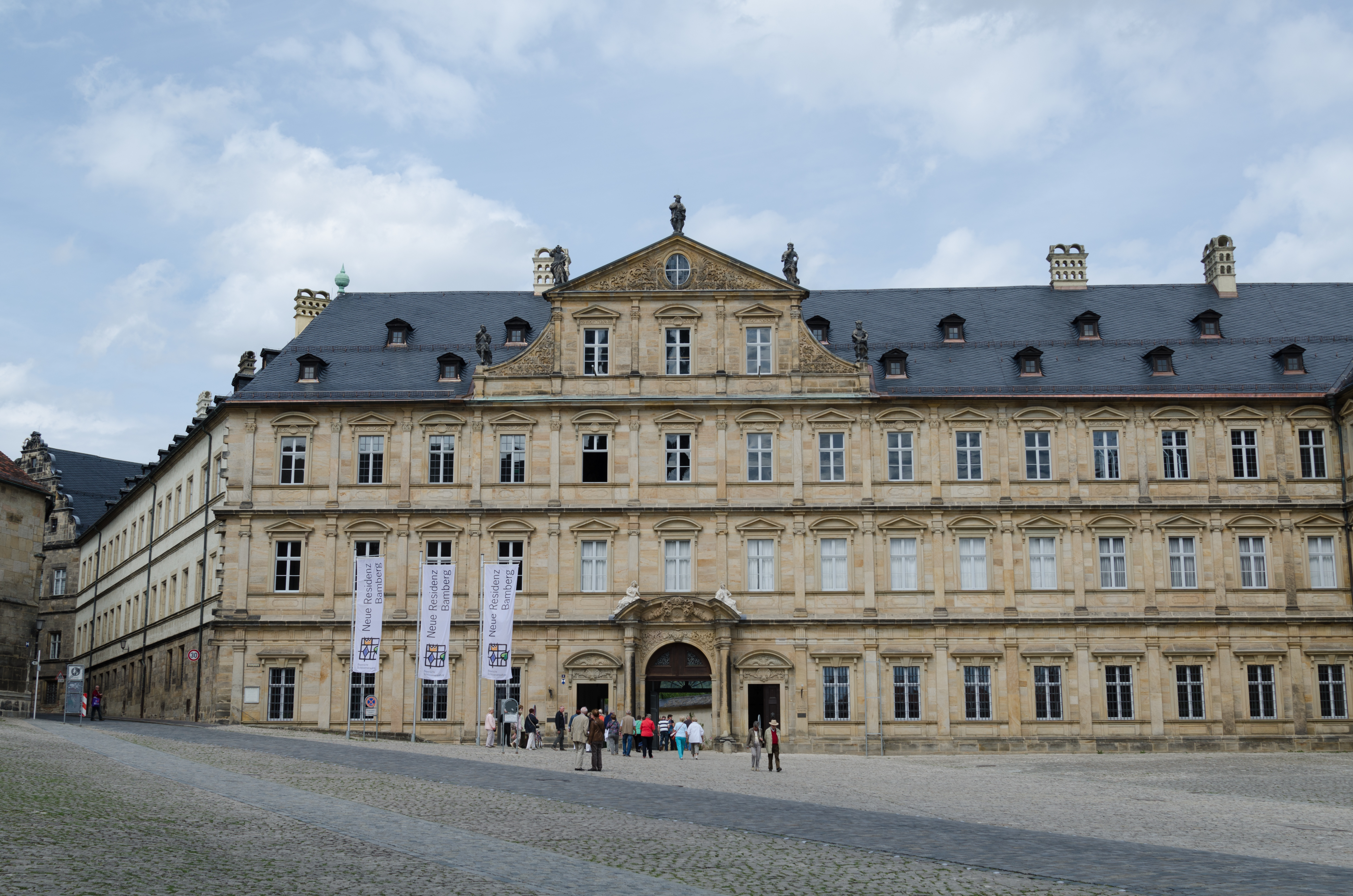
The Neue Residenz in Bamberg where Berthier died falling from a third floor window

On Napoleon's return to France in March 1815, Berthier withdrew to the Bavarian city of Bamberg. On 1 June 1815 he died from a fall from an upstairs window at the Neue Residenz, a 17th-century Bishop's residence. The manner of his death remains uncertain because he fell from a casement window with a sill 4 ft (1.2 m) from the floor, making an accident seem unlikely. According to some accounts, he was assassinated by members of a secret society, while others say he threw himself from the window, maddened at the sight of Russian troops marching to invade France. It remains unclear whether his defenestration was suicide or murder.

His loss was keenly felt by Napoleon, who wished he had his former Chief of Staff at Waterloo:

If Berthier had been there, I would not have met this misfortune.

== Character assessment ==
Berthier was an immensely skilled chief of staff, but he was not a great field commander. When he was in temporary command in 1809, the French army in Bavaria underwent a series of reverses. Despite the fact that his merit as a general was completely overshadowed by the genius of Napoleon, Berthier was nevertheless renowned for his excellent organising skills and being able to understand and carry out the emperor's directions to the minutest detail. General Paul Thiébault wrote of him:

No one could have better suited General Bonaparte, who wanted a man capable of relieving him of all detailed work, to understand him instantly and to foresee what he would need.

== In popular culture ==
=== Literature ===
Berthier is mentioned and/or appears in several of Sir Arthur Conan Doyle's Brigadier Gerard stories, including How the Brigadier Was Tempted by the Devil (1895), and in Leo Tolstoy's War and Peace. He is the main character in the 2024 French historical novel, York-Town, by Gérard Cardonne.

=== Video games ===
Berthier is prominently featured in the 2010 video game Napoleon: Total War, where he serves as the narrator of the campaign/story mode, and the battle advisor to the French faction during battles. He is also featured prominently in the three tutorial missions in the game, and also appears in two of the game's historical battles. The game is slightly inaccurate in Berthier's life, in that Berthier gives the narration about the Battle of Waterloo, regardless of a win or a loss, while in real life, Berthier died shortly before the battle from a fall in his home.

== Bibliography ==
- Watson, S.J. (1957), By Command of the Emperor: A Life of Marshal Berthier, London: The Bodley Head

== Archive sources ==
The Berthier collection is conserved in the archives of the State of Neuchâtel. It contains more than 2'000 items inventoried in 1895–1896 by Albert Dufourcq. The collection contains correspondence sent and received by the prince in connection with the general affairs of the Principality or particular affairs.

- Berthier Alexandre, Fonds: Alexandre Berthier (1789–1816). Archives de l'État de Neuchâtel.

Political offices
Preceded by Edmond Louis Alexis Dubois-Crancé	Minister of War; 11 November 1799 – 2 April 1800	Succeeded by Lazare Carnot
Preceded by Lazare Carnot	Minister of War; 8 October 1800 – 19 August 1807	Succeeded by Henri Clarke, duc de Feltre
Regnal titles
Preceded by Frederick William III	Prince of Neuchâtel; 25 February 1806 – 3 June 1814	Succeeded by Frederick William III
