= Countess Palatine Maria Anna of Zweibrücken-Birkenfeld =

Maria Anna of Zweibrücken-Birkenfeld
- Countess Palatine of Birkenfeld-Gelnhausen; Duchess in Bavaria
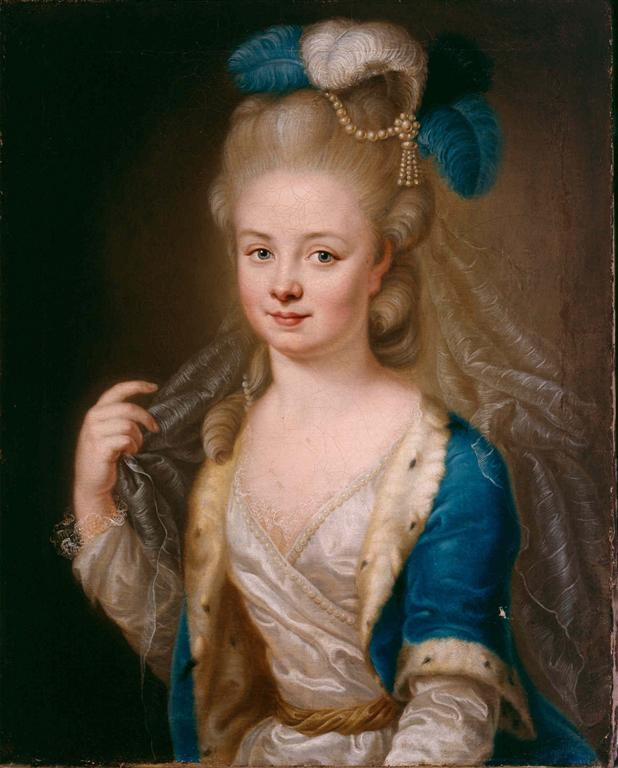
- Portrait by Heinrich Carl Brandt
- Born: 18 July 1753; Schwetzingen
- Died: 4 February 1824 (aged 70); Bamberg
- Spouse: Duke Wilhelm in Bavaria
- Issue: Maria Elisabeth, Princess of Neûchatel; Duke Pius August
Names
- Maria Amalie Auguste
- House: House of Wittelsbach
- Father: Frederick Michael of Zweibrücken-Birkenfeld
- Mother: Countess Palatine Maria Franziska of Sulzbach

Countess Palatine Maria Anna of Zweibrücken-Birkenfeld-Bischweiler (18 July 1753 – 4 February 1824) was Countess Palatine of Birkenfeld-Gelnhausen and Duchess in Bavaria, through her marriage to Duke Wilhelm in Bavaria. Maria Anna was a great-grandmother of Empress Elisabeth of Austria through her son Duke Pius August in Bavaria.

== Family ==
Maria Anna was born in Schwetzingen, as the second daughter of Count Palatine Frederick Michael of Palatinate-Zweibrücken-Birkenfeld-Bischweiler and his wife, Countess Palatine Maria Francisca of Palatinate-Sulzbach. She was the sister of Maximilian Joseph, later King of Bavaria and Amalie, the last Electress and first Queen of Saxony.

== Marriage and issue ==
Maria Anna married Duke Wilhelm in Bavaria, a son of John, Count Palatine of Gelnhausen and his wife Sophie Charlotte of Salm-Dhaun, on 30 January 1780 in Mannheim. Wilhelm and Maria Anna had two children:

- unnamed son (6 May 1782)
- Duchess Maria Elisabeth Amalie Franziska in Bavaria (5 May 1784 – 1 June 1849) married the French Marshall Louis Alexandre Berthier, 1st Duc de Wagram and had issue.
- Duke Pius August in Bavaria (1 August 1786 – 3 August 1837)

== Ancestry ==
Ancestors of Countess Palatine Maria Anna of Zweibrücken-Birkenfeld

16. Christian I, Count Palatine of Birkenfeld-Bischweiler
8. Christian II, Count Palatine of Zweibrücken-Birkenfeld
17. Countess Palatine Magdalena Katharina of Zweibrücken
4. Christian III, Count Palatine of Zweibrücken
18. Johann Jakob, Count of Rappoltstein
9. Countess Katharina Agathe of Rappoltstein
19. Wild- and Rhinegravine Anna Claudia of Salm-Kyrburg
2. Frederick Michael, Count Palatine of Zweibrücken
20. Gustav Adolf, Count of Nassau-Saarbrücken
10. Ludwig Kraft, Count of Nassau-Saarbrücken
21. Countess Eleonore Claire of Hohenlohe-Neuenstein
5. Countess Caroline of Nassau-Saarbrücken
22. Heinrich Friedrich, Prince of Hohenlohe-Langenburg
11. Princess Philippine Henriette of Hohenlohe-Langenburg
23. Countess Juliana Dorothea of Castell-Remlingen
1. Countess Palatine Maria Anna of Zweibrücken-Birkenfeld
24. Christian Augustus, Count Palatine of Sulzbach
12. Theodore Eustace, Count Palatine of Sulzbach
25. Countess Amalie of Nassau-Siegen
6. Count Palatine Joseph Charles of Sulzbach
26. William, Landgrave of Hesse-Rotenburg
13. Landgravine Maria Eleonore of Hesse-Rotenburg
27. Countess Maria of Löwenstein-Wertheim-Rochefort
3. Countess Palatine Maria Franziska of Sulzbach
28. Philip William, Elector Palatine
14. Charles III Philip, Elector Palatine
29. Landgravine Elisabeth Amalie of Hesse-Darmstadt
7. Countess Palatine Elisabeth Auguste Sofie of Neuburg
30. Bogusław Radziwiłł
15. Ludwika Karolina Radziwiłł
31. Anna Maria Radziwiłł
