= Duchess Maria Elisabeth in Bavaria =

Duchess Maria Elisabeth
- Princess of Wagram
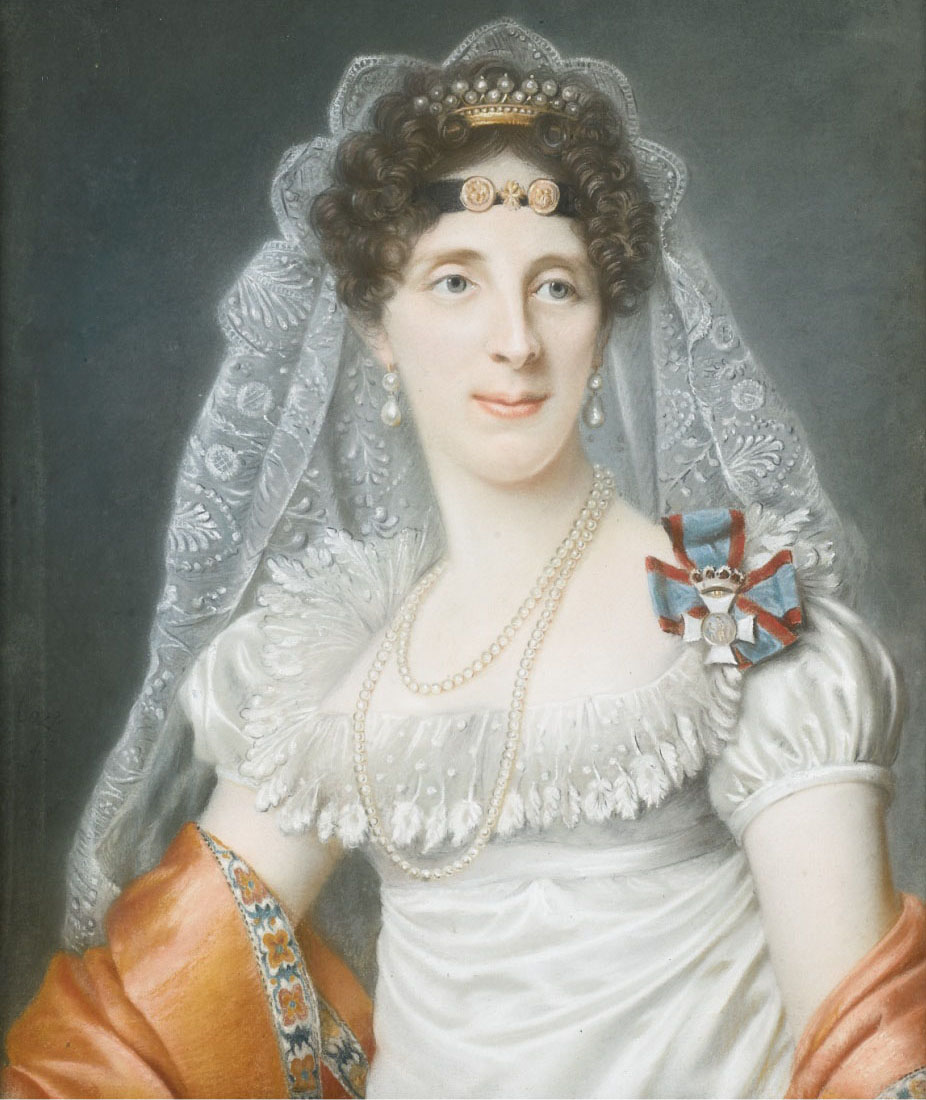
- Portrait by Joseph Boze

Princess consort of Neuchâtel
- Tenure: 9 March 1808 – 3 June 1814
- Born: 5 May 1784; Landshut, Electorate of Bavaria
- Died: 1 June 1849 (aged 65); Paris, France
- Spouse: Louis-Alexandre Berthier
- Issue: Napoléon Alexandre Berthier, 2nd Prince of Wagram; Caroline Joséphine, Baroness of Hautpoul; Marie Anne, Duchess of Plaisance
Names
- German: Maria Elisabeth Amalie Franziska
- House: Wittelsbach
- Father: Duke Wilhelm in Bavaria
- Mother: Countess Palatine Maria Anna of Zweibrücken-Birkenfeld

Duchess Maria Elisabeth Amalie Franziska in Bavaria (5 May 1784 – 1 June 1849) was a Duchess in Bavaria as a member of the Palatine Birkenfeld-Gelnhausen line of the House of Wittelsbach and through her marriage to Louis-Alexandre Berthier became Princess of Wagram and Princess of Neuchâtel.

== Life ==
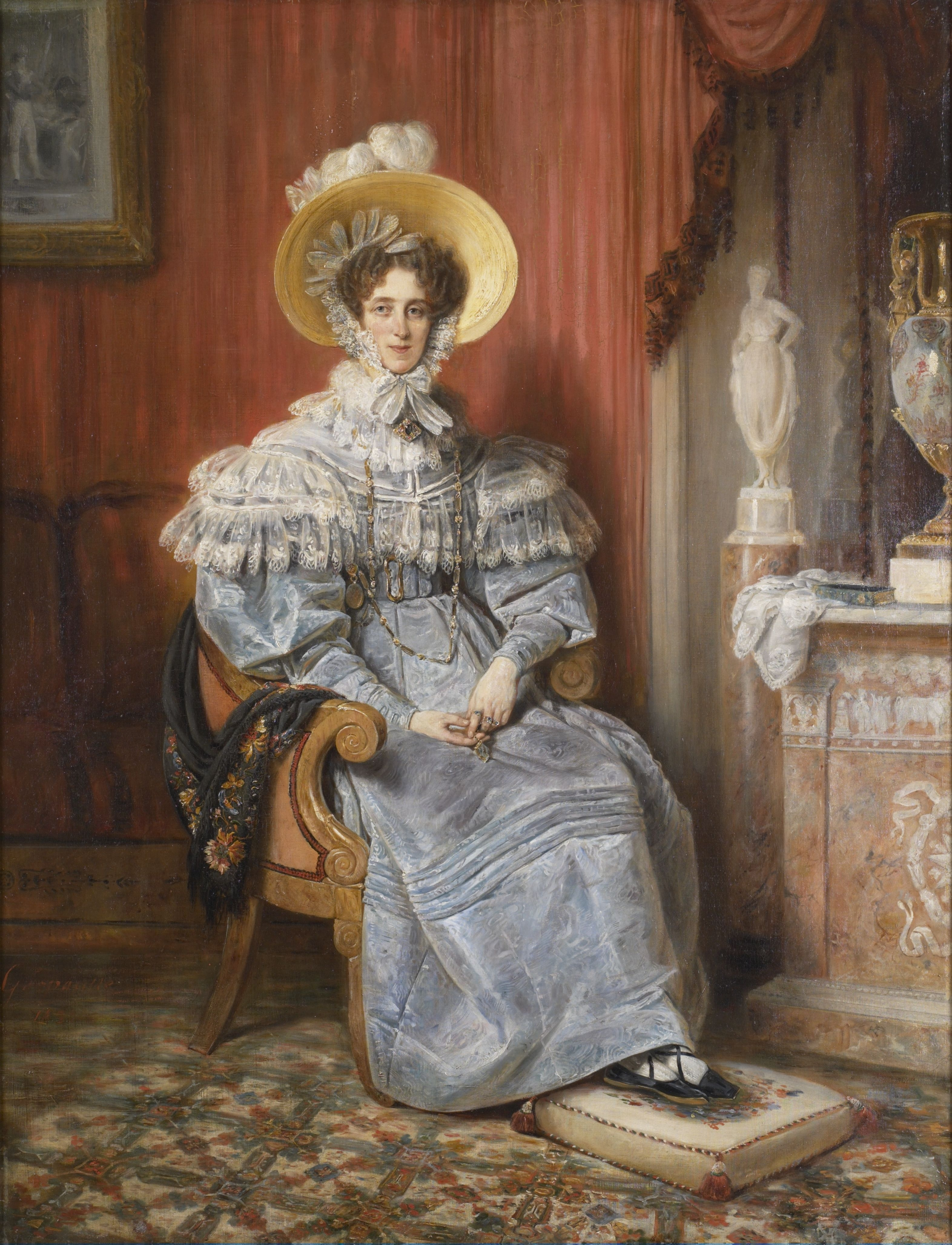
The Princess in 1832 by François-Gabriel Lépaulle

Maria Elisabeth was born in Landshut, Electorate of Bavaria, the only daughter and second child of Duke Wilhelm in Bavaria and his wife Countess Palatine Maria Anna of Zweibrücken-Birkenfeld, sister of the future king Maximilian I Joseph of Bavaria. She died in Paris, France, aged 65.

== Marriage and issue ==
Maria Elisabeth married Louis-Alexandre Berthier (20 February 1753 – 1 June 1815), 1st Prince of Wagram, 1st Sovereign Prince of Neuchâtel and a Marshal of France, on 9 March 1808. The marriage took place at the explicit request of Emperor Napoleon I. They had one son and two daughters :

- Napoléon Alexandre, 2nd Prince, 1st Duke (11 September 1810 – 10 February 1887) married on 29 June 1831 Zénaïde Françoise Clary (25 November 1812 – 27 April 1884) and had issue, extinct in male line in 1918
- Caroline Joséphine (22 August 1812 – 1905) married on 9 October 1832 Alphonse Napoléon, Baron of Hautpoul (29 May 1806 – 25 April 1889)
- Marie Anne Wilhelmine Alexandrine Elisabeth (19 February 1816 – 23 July 1878) married on 24 June 1834 Jules Lebrun, 3rd Duke of Plaisance (19 April 1811 – 15 January 1872)

== Ancestry ==
Ancestors of Duchess Maria Elisabeth in Bavaria

16. Christian I, Count Palatine of Birkenfeld-Bischweiler
8. John Charles, Count Palatine of Gelnhausen
17. Countess Palatine Magdalene Catherine of Zweibrücken
4. John, Count Palatine of Gelnhausen
18. Georg Friedrich von Witzleben
9. Esther Maria von Witzleben
19. Maria Magdalena von Hanstein
2. Duke Wilhelm in Bavaria
20. John Philip II, Wild- and Rhinegrave of Salm-Dhaun
10. Charles, Wild- and Rhinegrave of Salm-Dhaun
21. Countess Anna Catherine of Nassau-Ottweiler
5. Wild- and Rhinegravine Sophie Charlotte of Salm-Dhaun
22. Frederick Louis, Count of Nassau-Ottweiler
11. Countess Louise of Nassau-Ottweiler
23. Countess Christiane of Ahlefeldt
1. Duchess Maria Elisabeth in Bavaria
24. Christian II, Count Palatine of Zweibrücken-Birkenfeld
12. Christian III, Count Palatine of Zweibrücken
25. Countess Katharina Agathe of Rappoltstein
6. Frederick Michael, Count Palatine of Zweibrücken
26. Louis Crato, Count of Nassau-Saarbrücken
13. Countess Caroline of Nassau-Saarbrücken
27. Countess Philippine Henriette of Hohenlohe-Langenburg
3. Countess Palatine Maria Anna of Zweibrücken-Birkenfeld
28. Theodore Eustace, Count Palatine of Sulzbach
14. Joseph Charles, Hereditary Prince of Sulzbach
29. Landgravine Maria Eleonore of Hesse-Rotenburg
7. Countess Palatine Maria Franziska of Sulzbach
30. Charles III Philip, Elector Palatine
15. Countess Palatine Elisabeth Auguste Sofie of Neuburg
31. Princess Ludwika Karolina Radziwiłł
