= Princes of Wagram =

Arms of the 1st Prince of Wagram

Prince of Wagram (French: Prince de Wagram; [pʁɛ̃s də vaɡ.ʁam]) was a title of French nobility that was granted to Marshal Louis-Alexandre Berthier in 1809. It was created as a victory title by Emperor Napoleon I after the Battle of Wagram. Berthier had previously been granted the title of Sovereign Prince of Neuchâtel in 1806.

After the death of Berthier in 1815, the subsequent inheritors of the title lived at the Château de Grosbois, a large estate in Boissy-Saint-Léger, Val-de-Marne, southeast of Paris. Since the 4th Prince of Wagram, Alexandre Berthier, had not yet married when he was killed in action during World War I, the title became extinct in 1918.

== List of titleholders ==
Image	Name	Birth date	Death date	succession
	Louis-Alexandre Berthier, 1st Prince of Wagram	20 November 1753	1 June 1815 (aged 62)	newly created Prince of Wagram on 31 December 1809
	Napoléon Alexandre Louis Joseph Berthier, 2nd Prince of Wagram	10 September 1810	10 February 1887 (aged 76)	son of the 1st Prince of Wagram
	Louis Philippe Marie Alexandre Berthier, 3rd Prince of Wagram	24 March 1836	15 July 1911 (aged 75)	son of the 2nd Prince of Wagram
	Alexandre Louis Philippe Marie Berthier, 4th Prince of Wagram	20 July 1883	30 May 1918 (aged 34)	son of the 3rd Prince of Wagram

== Tombs ==
The 1st Prince of Wagram is buried in the Wittelsbach crypt at Tegernsee Abbey, while the 2nd, the 3rd and the 4th Prince are buried at the Château de Grosbois.
