= Duke Wilhelm in Bavaria =

Wilhelm
- Count Palatine of Birkenfeld-Gelnhausen; Duke in Bavaria
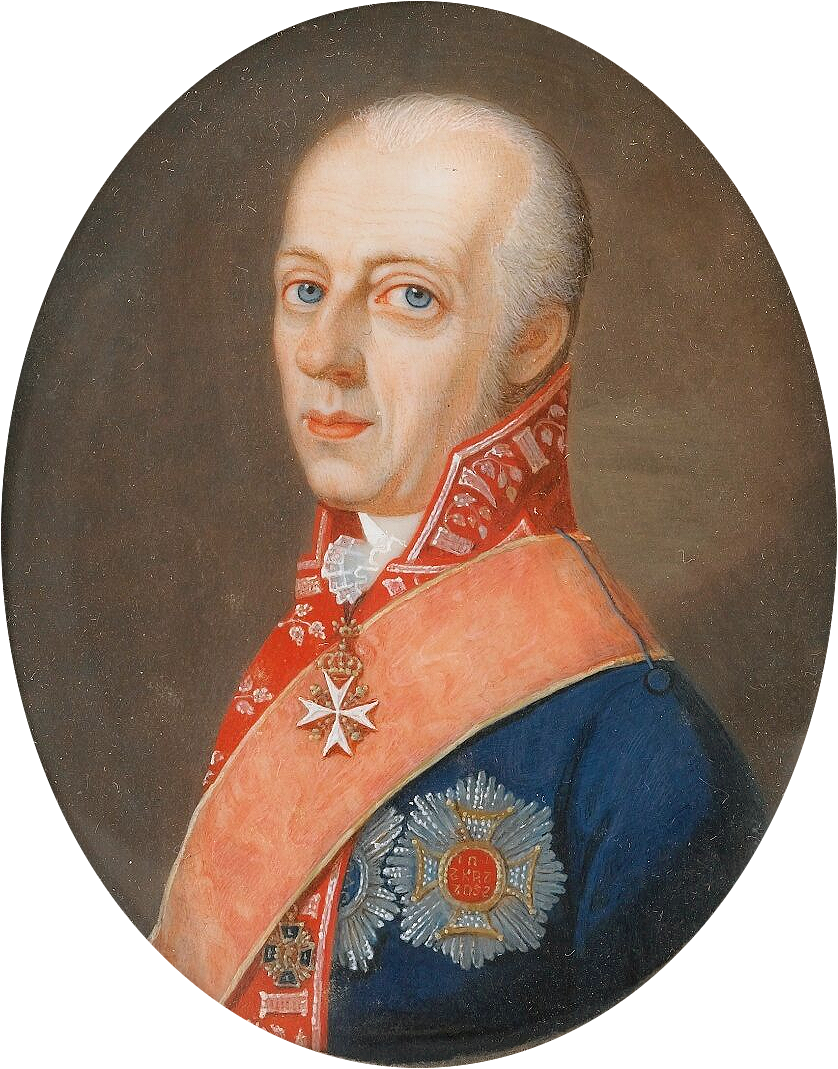
- Born: 10 November 1752; Gelnhausen, Palatinate-Birkenfeld-Gelnhausen, Holy Roman Empire
- Died: 8 January 1837 (aged 84); Landshut or Bamberg, Kingdom of Bavaria
- Burial: Tegernsee Abbey
- Spouse: Countess Palatine Maria Anna of Zweibrücken-Birkenfeld
- Issue: Maria Elisabeth, Princess of Neûchatel; Duke Pius August
- House: House of Wittelsbach
- Father: John, Count Palatine of Gelnhausen
- Mother: Wildgravine and Rhinegravine Sophie Charlotte of Salm-Dhaun

Duke Wilhelm in Bavaria (full German name: Wilhelm, Herzog in Bayern; 10 November 1752 – 8 January 1837) was a German prince of the House of Wittelsbach.

Born into a non-ruling cadet branch of the widely branched House of Wittelsbach, Wilhelm was Count Palatine of Birkenfeld-Gelnhausen between 1789 and 1799 and first Duke in Bavaria from 16 February 1799 until his death in 1837. He never ruled over his own principality, but from 17 December 1803 to 20 March 1806 he was titled Duke of Berg.

== Early life ==
Wilhelm was born on 10 November 1752 in Gelnhausen in the Palatinate-Birkenfeld-Gelnhausen. He was the second son and the fourth of eight children born to John, Count Palatine of Gelnhausen and his wife Wild- and Rhinegravine Sophie Charlotte of Salm-Dhaun.

Wilhelm converted to Catholicism on 15 August 1769. In 1778, he became an honorary member of the Bavarian Academy of Sciences and Humanities.

== Marriage and issue ==
Wilhelm married Countess Palatine Maria Anna of Zweibrücken-Birkenfeld, sister of the first King of Bavaria Maximilian I, daughter of Frederick Michael, Count Palatine of Zweibrücken and his wife Countess Palatine Maria Franziska of Sulzbach, on 30 January 1780 in Mannheim. Wilhelm and Maria Anna had two children:

- unnamed son (6 May 1782)
- Duchess Maria Elisabeth Amalie Franziska in Bavaria (5 May 1784 – 1 June 1849) married the French Marshall Louis Alexandre Berthier, 1st Prince de Wagram and had issue.
- Duke Pius August in Bavaria (1 August 1786 – 3 August 1837)

== Duke in Bavaria ==
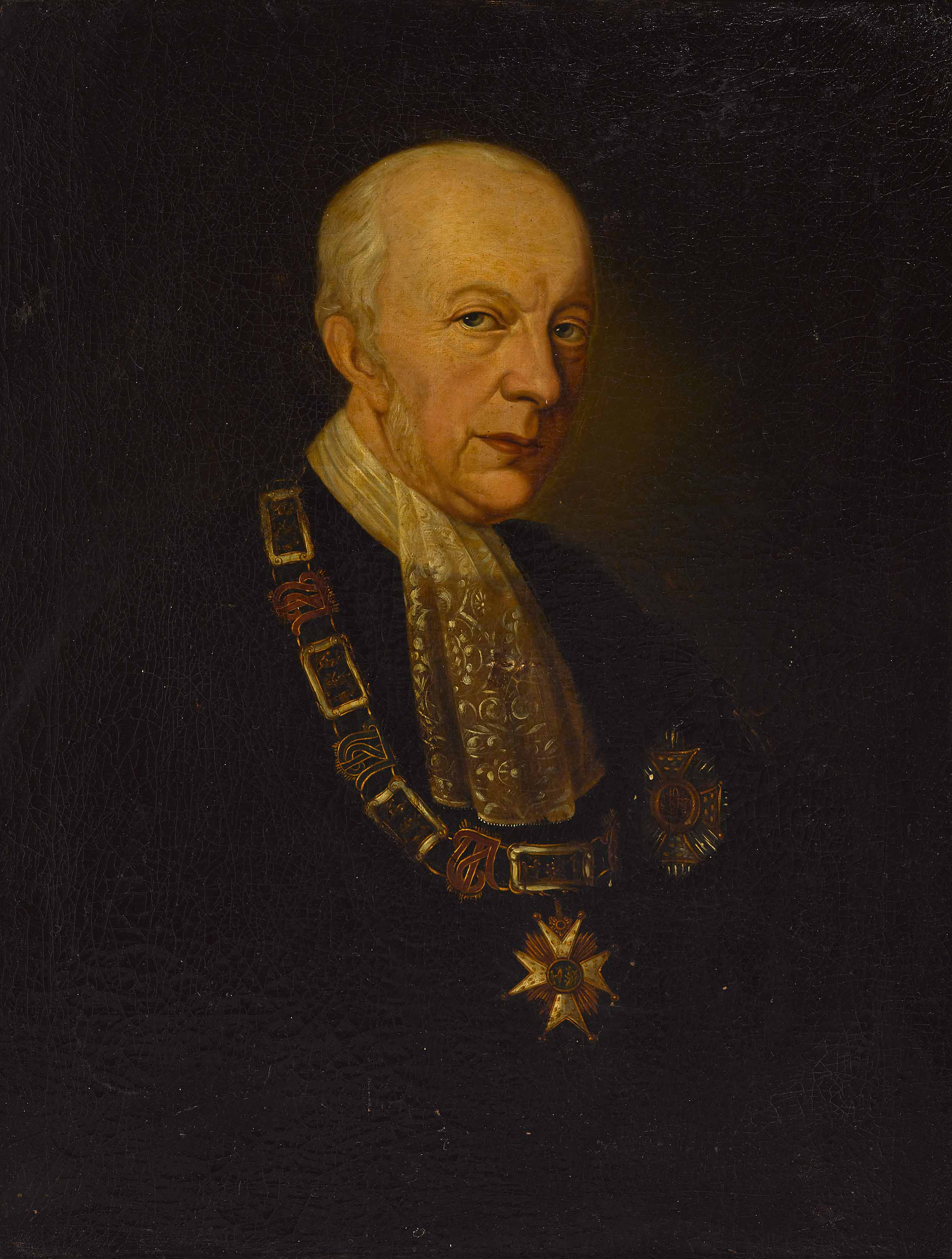
Duke Wilhelm in his old age, c. 1820

As his elder brother Charles John Louis, Count of Palatine-Gelnhausen died unmarried and without issue, on 31 March 1789, Wilhelm succeeded him as head of the Gelnhausen branch of the House of Wittelsbach.

On 16 February 1799, the head of the House of Wittelsbach Charles Theodore, Elector of Bavaria died. At the time there were two surviving branches of the Wittelsbach family: Zweibrücken (headed by Duke Maximilian Joseph) and Birkenfeld (headed by Count Palatine Wilhelm). Maximilian Joseph inherited Charles Theodor's title of Elector of Bavaria, while Wilhelm was compensated with the title of Duke in Bavaria. The form Duke in Bavaria was selected because in 1506 primogeniture had been established in the House of Wittelsbach resulting in there being only one Duke of Bavaria at any given time.

== Death ==
Duke Wilhelm died on 8 January 1837 in Landshut or Bamberg in the Kingdom of Bavaria. He was interred at the family burial crypt of the Dukes in Bavaria at Tegernsee Abbey.

== Ancestry ==
Ancestors of Duke Wilhelm in Bavaria

8. Christian I, Count Palatine of Birkenfeld-Bischweiler
4. John Charles, Count Palatine of Gelnhausen
9. Countess Palatine Magdalene Catherine of Zweibrücken
2. John, Count Palatine of Gelnhausen
10. Georg Friedrich von Witzleben
5. Esther Maria von Witzleben
11. Maria Magdalena von Hanstein
1. Duke Wilhelm in Bavaria
12. John Philip II, Wild- and Rhinegrave of Salm-Dhaun
6. Charles, Wild- and Rhinegrave of Salm-Dhaun
13. Countess Anna Catherine of Nassau-Ottweiler
3. Wild- and Rhinegravine Sophie Charlotte of Salm-Dhaun
14. Frederick Louis, Count of Nassau-Ottweiler
7. Countess Louise of Nassau-Ottweiler
15. Countess Christiane of Ahlefedlt-Rixingen

Duke Wilhelm in Bavaria House of Palatinate-Birkenfeld-Gelnhausen Cadet branch of the House of Wittelsbach Born: 10 November 1752 Died: 8 January 1837
German nobility
Preceded by Charles John Louis	Count Palatine of Birkenfeld-Gelnhausen; 31 March 1789 – 16 February 1799	Succeeded by None
