= Château de Grosbois =

Castle in Val-de-Marne, France

Coordinates: 48°44′7″N 2°31′39″E

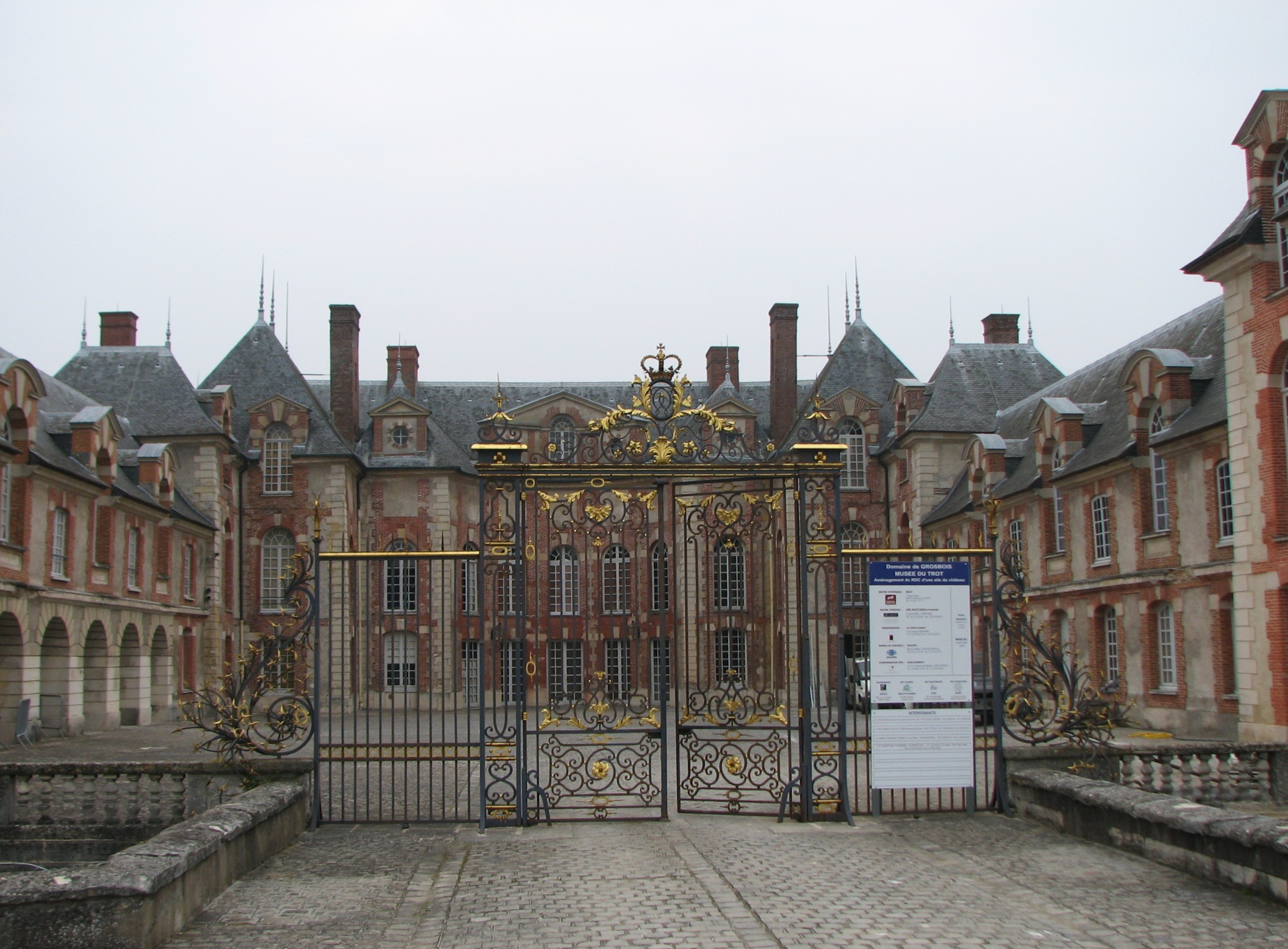
Entrance to the château de Grosbois

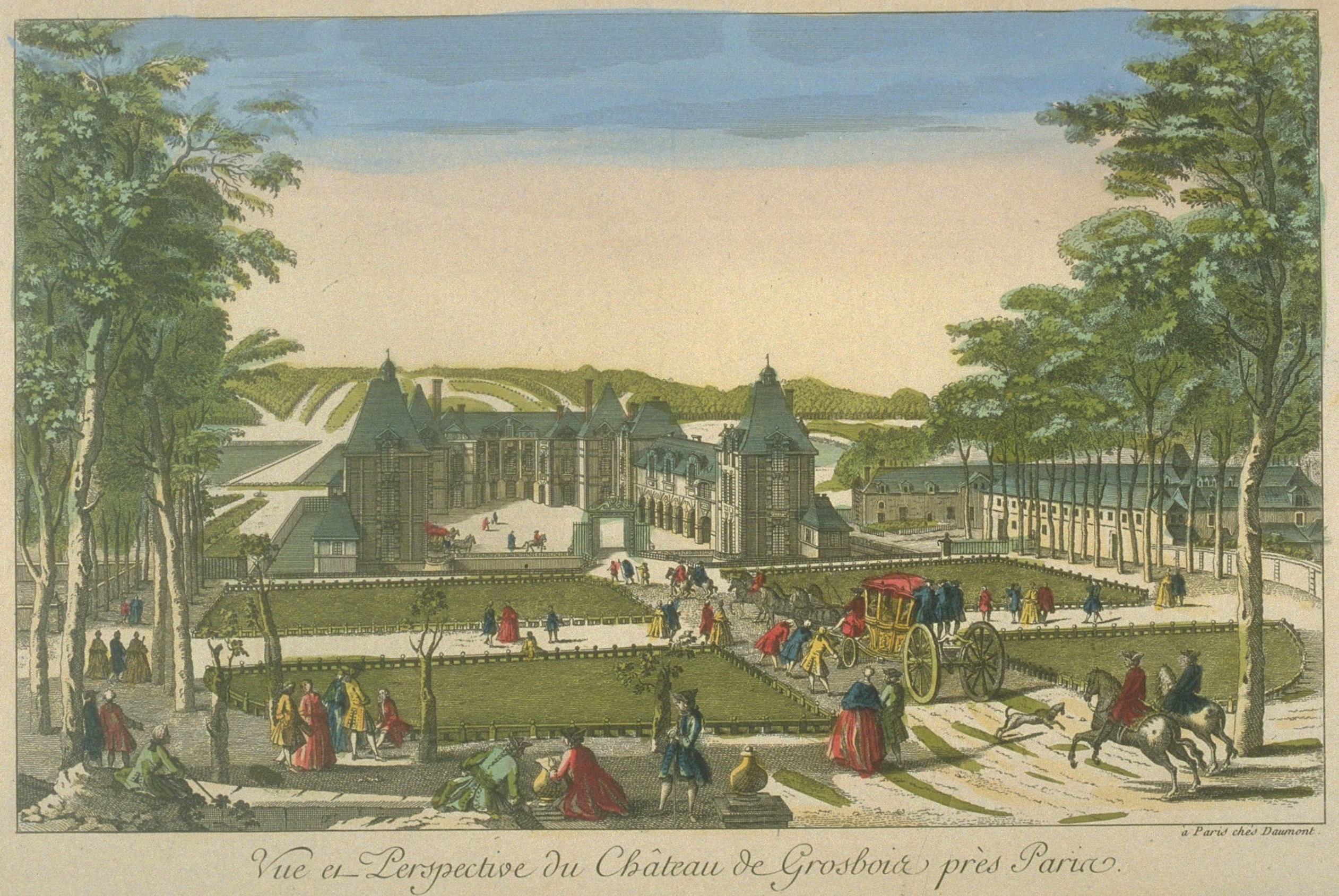
The château de Grosbois in the 19th century

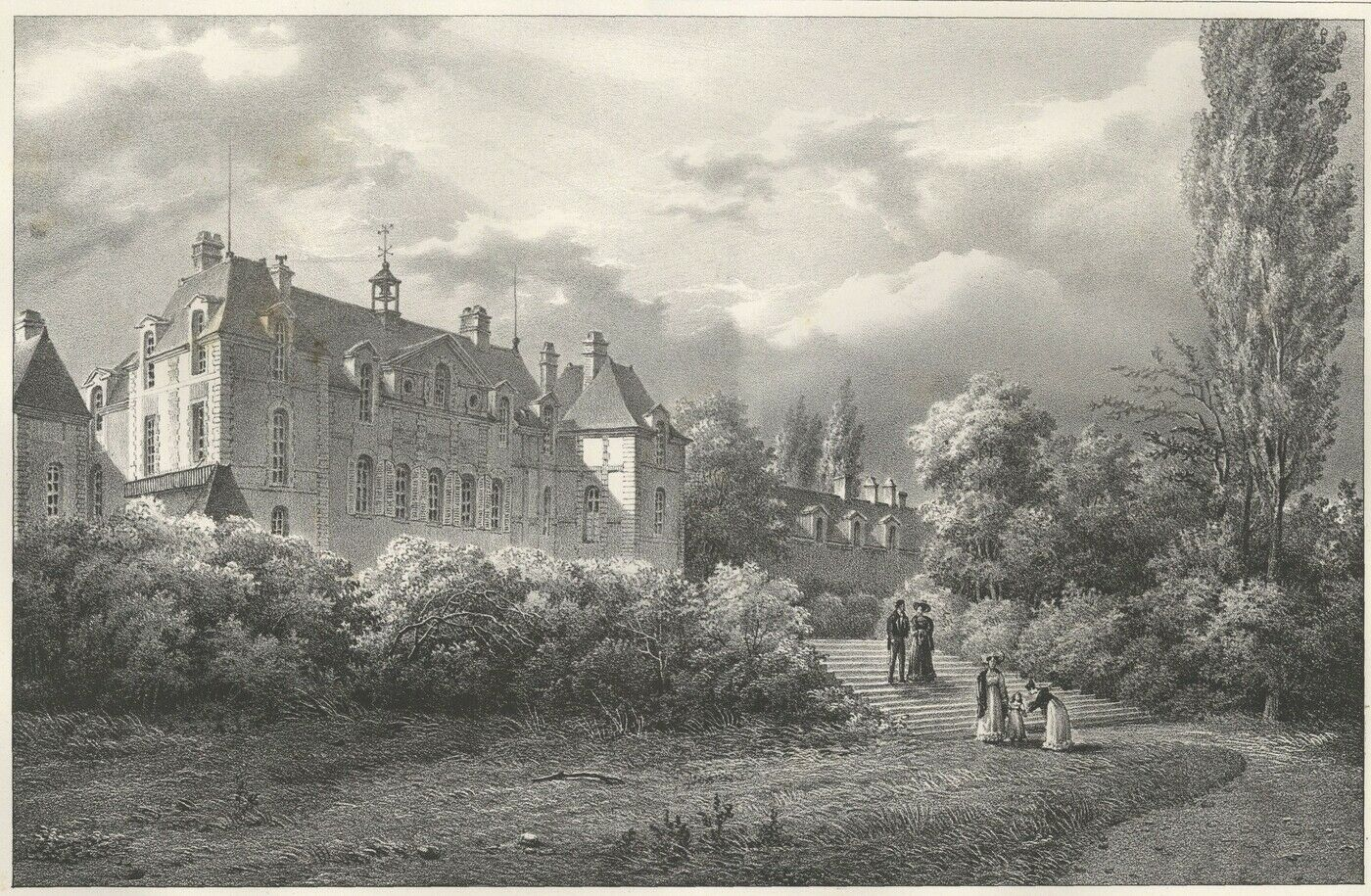
Château de Grosbois, lithograph by C. Molle from a drawing by Charles-Caïus Renoux

The château de Grosbois (French pronunciation: [ʃɑto də ɡʁobwɑ]) is a castle in Boissy-Saint-Léger, Val-de-Marne, France.

== History ==
In 1190, Philip II of France gave lands at Grosbois to the abbey of Saint-Victor, in exchange for lands in the bois de Vincennes. The abbey ceded these lands in 1563 to Raoul Moreau, trésorier de l'Épargne relation Nicolas Harlay de Sancy, surintendant des Finances et des Bâtiments du roi, built a château there at the start of the 17th century. This was still incomplete in 1616, when it was sold to Charles de Valois (1573–1650), count of Auvergne then duke of Angoulême (1619), illegitimate son of Charles IX of France by Marie Touchet. Valois completed the château around 1640, notably building the enclosing wall (1623) and the two wings. On his death in 1650 the estate passed to his granddaughter, wife of Louis, Duke of Joyeuse.

In 1718, the estate was bought by Samuel-Jacques Bernard (1686-1753), son of the financier Samuel Bernard, who commissioned the woodwork in the salon Régence. He then sold it to Germain Louis Chauvelin in 1731, who in 1762 sold it in turn to François Marie Peyrenc de Moras. She left it to her great-niece Anne Marie de Merle de Beauchamps in 1771 - Anne Marie was daughter of an ambassador to the king of Portugal and wife of Pierre Paul Gilbert des Voisins, président to the parlement de Paris. She and her husband sold it to the comte de Provence in 1776.

It was confiscated as national property on the French Revolution and sold on 9 November 1797 to Barras, known as 'the king of the Directory'. After 18 brumaire, Barras was exiled to Belgium and sold the château, in 1801, to général Moreau. In 1804, after Moreau's arrest, Napoleon bought the château via Fouché and in 1805 granted it to maréchal Berthier, prince of Wagram. Berthier spent much money embellishing it, expanding the library, the galerie des Batailles, the salon de l'Empereur and the salon des Huissiers. He also built two more pavilions and the entrance gate across the road. He enlarged the estate to make it the best hunting-ground in the French Empire and gave grand festivals there. His son Napoléon Berthier expanded the library, which included over 3,000 works.

On August 1, 1914, Alexander Louis Philippe Marie Berthier, the 4th Prince of Wagram, left Grosbois to his sister, Elisabeth Berthier de Wagram, Princesse de la Tour d’Auvergne, before leaving for the army. He died April 30, 1918, from battle wounds. He was unmarried and was the last Prince of Wagram. The 2nd, the 3rd and the 4th Prince of Wagram are buried at Grosbois Castle.

During the war, Grosbois Castle served as a hospital for the Red Cross with 30 beds. Army troops were also quartered by the hundreds in the castle. Elisabeth Berthier de Wagram was the last owner of the line of Berthier. She died in 1960. Due to taxes, upkeep and other financial reasons, the property was sold in 1962 to René Ballière, president of the Société d’encouragement à l’élevage du cheval français, who bought the estate to set up a training centre for racehorses.

== Architecture ==
Designed by an unknown architect, the château de Grosbois is clearly influenced by those designed by Jacques Androuet du Cerceau. On a U plan, it is made up of a central wing curved into an exedra, flanked by two pavilions of the same height and by two lower wings at right angles. It is built on a rectangular platform in the middle of a once water-filled moat, now dry. It is reached by three bridges.
