= Jean-Baptiste Berthier =

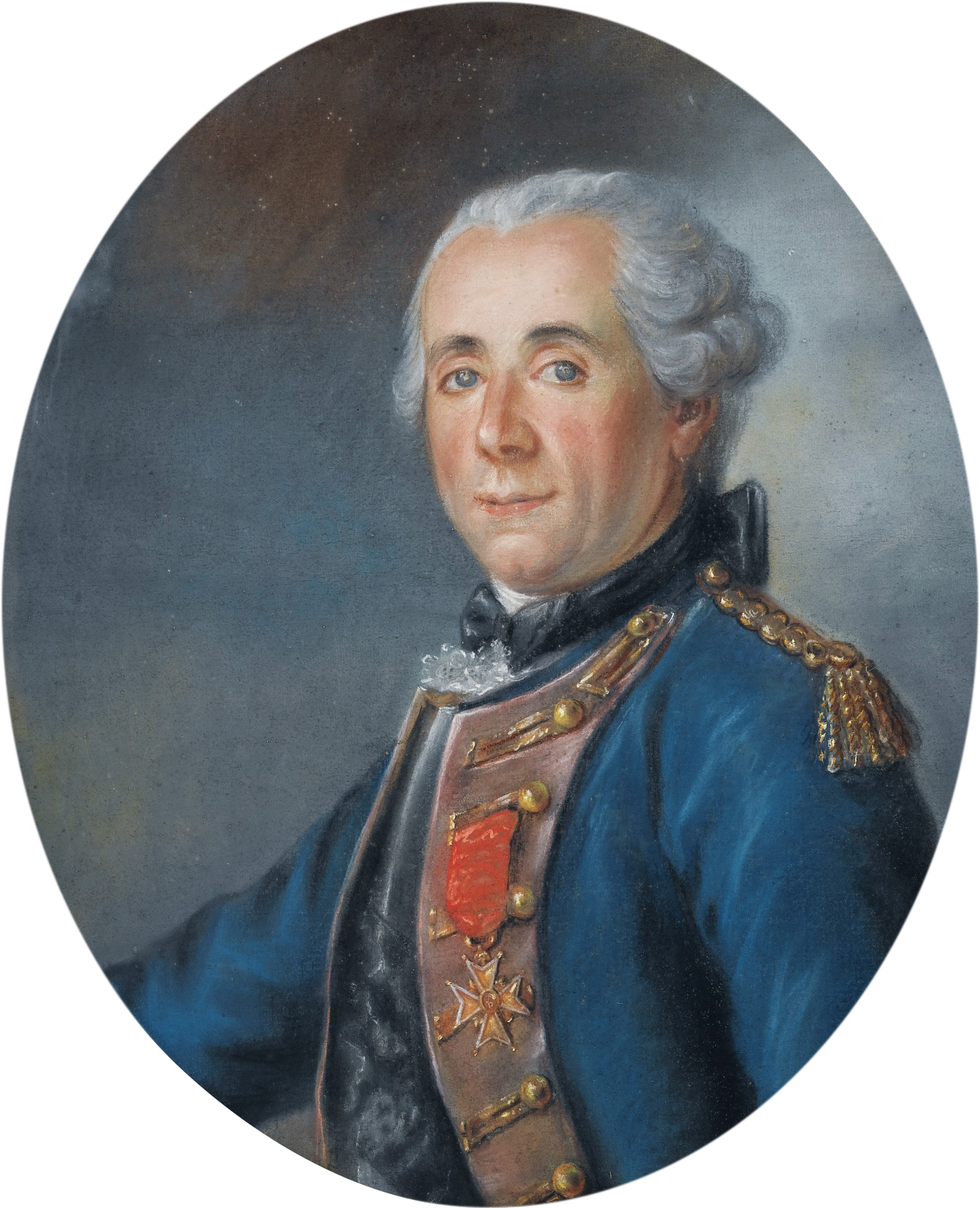
- Jean-Baptiste Berthier
- Born: 6 January 1721; Tonnerre, France
- Died: 21 May 1804 (aged 83); Paris, First French Empire
- Occupations: Military officer, architect, cartographer
- Spouses: Marie Françoise L'Huillier de La Serre; Françoise Chéron
- Children: Louis Alexandre Berthier; Charles Berthier; César Berthier; Victor-Léopold Berthier; Madame d'Ogeranville; Alexandre Joseph Berthier

Jean-Baptiste Berthier (1721–1804) was an officer (Lieutenant-Colonel) in the French Corps of Topographical Engineers during the reigns of Louis XV and Louis XVI.

== Biography ==
=== Early life ===
Jean-Baptiste Berthier was born on 6 January 1721 in Tonnerre, France.

=== Career ===
After attracting the attention of marchal de camp Charles Louis Auguste Fouquet, duc de Belle-Isle, he was deputed by him to supervise construction of several prominent Paris public buildings, notably those of the ministries of war, navy and foreign affairs in Versailles.

In 1758, he was made Director of Military Survey to King Louis XV, a position he retained with Louis XVI for whom he prepared the famous topographic maps of the Royal hunting grounds.

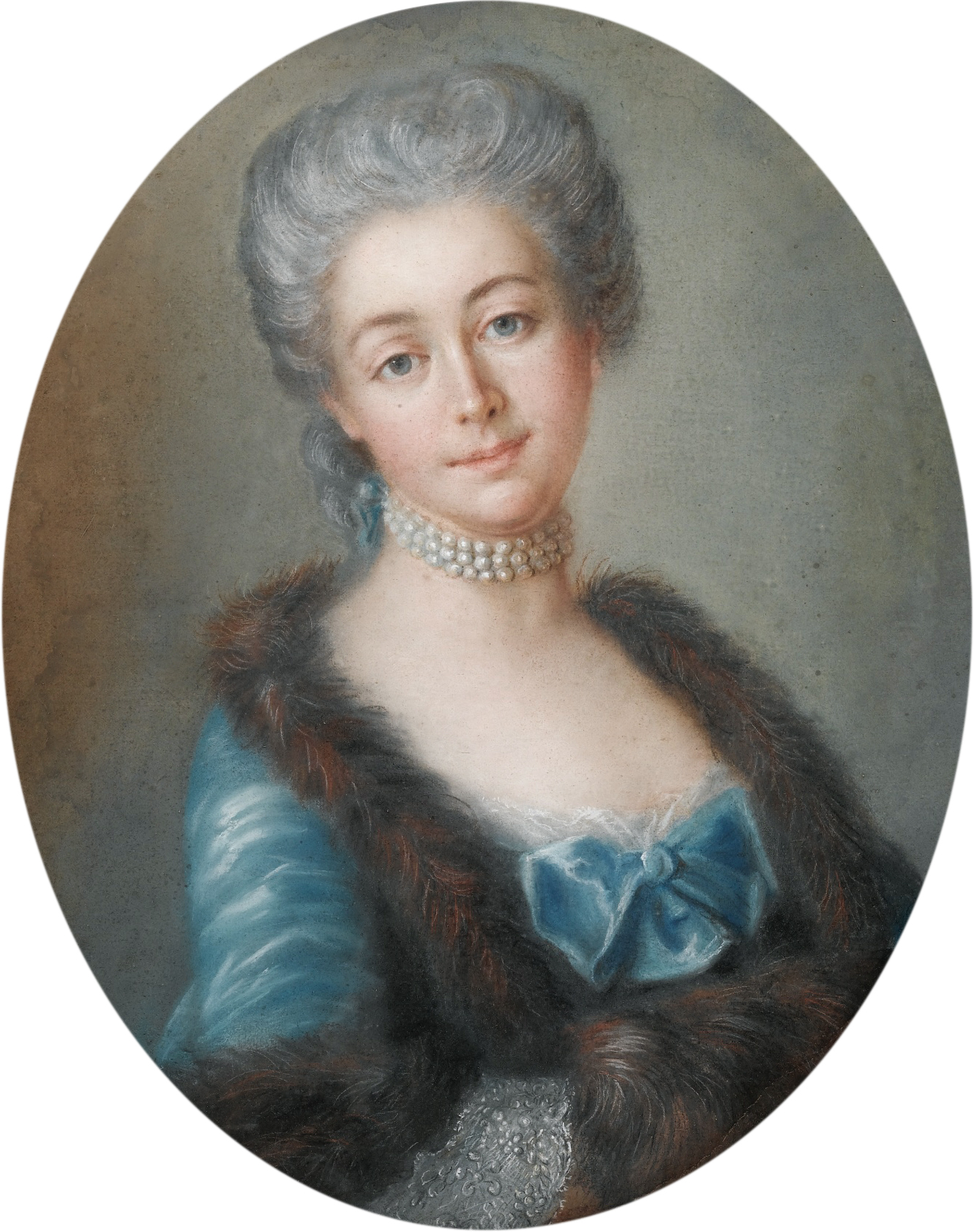
Marie Françoise L'Huillier de La Serre

=== Personal life ===
He married his first wife, Marie Françoise L'Huillier de La Serre, in 1746. Together, they had seven children, with all his sons following him into the military and three of them becoming generals in Napoleon's army.

- Berlouis Berthier (1751–1778), died in America early in the American Revolutionary War, possibly as a result of a duel
- Louis Alexandre Berthier (1753–1815), Marshal of the Empire
- Antoinette Berthier (born 1757), married Major Pascal-Pierre Pérache de Franqueville
- Thérèse Berthier (1760–1827), married General François d'Avrange d'Haugéranville, remembered as Madame d'Ogeranville.
- César Berthier (1765–1819), General
- Louis-Stanislas-Marie (born 1767), died in infancy
- Victor-Léopold Berthier (1770–1807), General

Widowed, he remarried Françoise Chéron. They had a son Alexandre Joseph Berthier (1792–1849), who married his niece Thérèse Léopoldine Berthier (1806–1882), and had issue, Viscounts Berthier de Wagram, extinct in 1949.

=== Death ===
He died on May 21, 1804, in Paris, France from a stroke.

== Sources ==
- Watson, S.J., By Command of the Emperor: A Life of Marshal Berthier, The Bodley Head, London, 1957
- Junot Abrantès, Laure, Memoirs of Napoleon, His Court and Family, R. Bentley, London, 1836
