= Countess Palatine Dorothea Catherine of Birkenfeld-Bischweiler =

- Coat-of-arms of Birkenfeld-Birkenfeld
- Born: 3 July 1634; Bischweiler
- Died: 7 December 1715 (aged 81); Neunkirchen
- Noble family: Wittelsbach
- Spouse: John Louis, Count of Nassau-Ottweiler
- Father: Christian I, Count Palatine of Birkenfeld-Bischweiler
- Mother: Magdalene Catherine, Countess Palatine of Zweibrücken

Countess Palatine Dorothea Catherine of Birkenfeld-Bischweiler (3 July 1634 – 7 December 1715) was a Countess Palatine of Zweibrücken-Birkenfeld-Bischweiler by birth and, by marriage, Countess of Nassau-Ottweiler.

== Life ==
Dorothea Catherine was born in Bischweiler, a daughter of the Count Palatine Christian I of Zweibrücken-Birkenfeld-Bischweiler (1598–1654) from his first marriage with Magdalene Catherine (1606–1648), daughter of the Count Palatine John II of Zweibrücken.

She married in 1649 in Bischweiler with Count John Louis of Nassau-Ottweiler (1625–1690), the founder of the line Nassau-Ottweiler.

After her husband's death Dorothea Catherine lived on her widow seat, Neunkirchen Castle near Ottweiler and was active in charity. She supported the construction and maintenance of a hospital in Ottweiler by contributing substantial financial resources. She died in Neunkirchen.

== Issue ==
From her marriage, Dorothea Catherine had the following children:

- Christian Louis (1650-1650)
- Frederick Louis (1651–1728)

married firstly on 28 July 1680 Countess Christiane of Ahlefeldt (1659-1695)
married secondly on 27 September 1697 Countess Louise Sophie of Hanau-Lichtenberg (1662-1751)

- Anna Catherine (1653–1731)

married in 1671 to John Philip Wild- and Rhinegrave of Salm-Dhaun (1645-1693)

- Wolrad (1656–1705)
- Charles Siegfried (1659–1679)
- Louis (1661–1699)

married on 9 April 1694 Countess Louise Amalie of Hornes (1665-1728)

- Louise (1662–1741)
- Maurice (1664–1666)
