= Frederick Louis, Count of Nassau-Ottweiler =

Frederick Louis of Nassau-Ottweiler
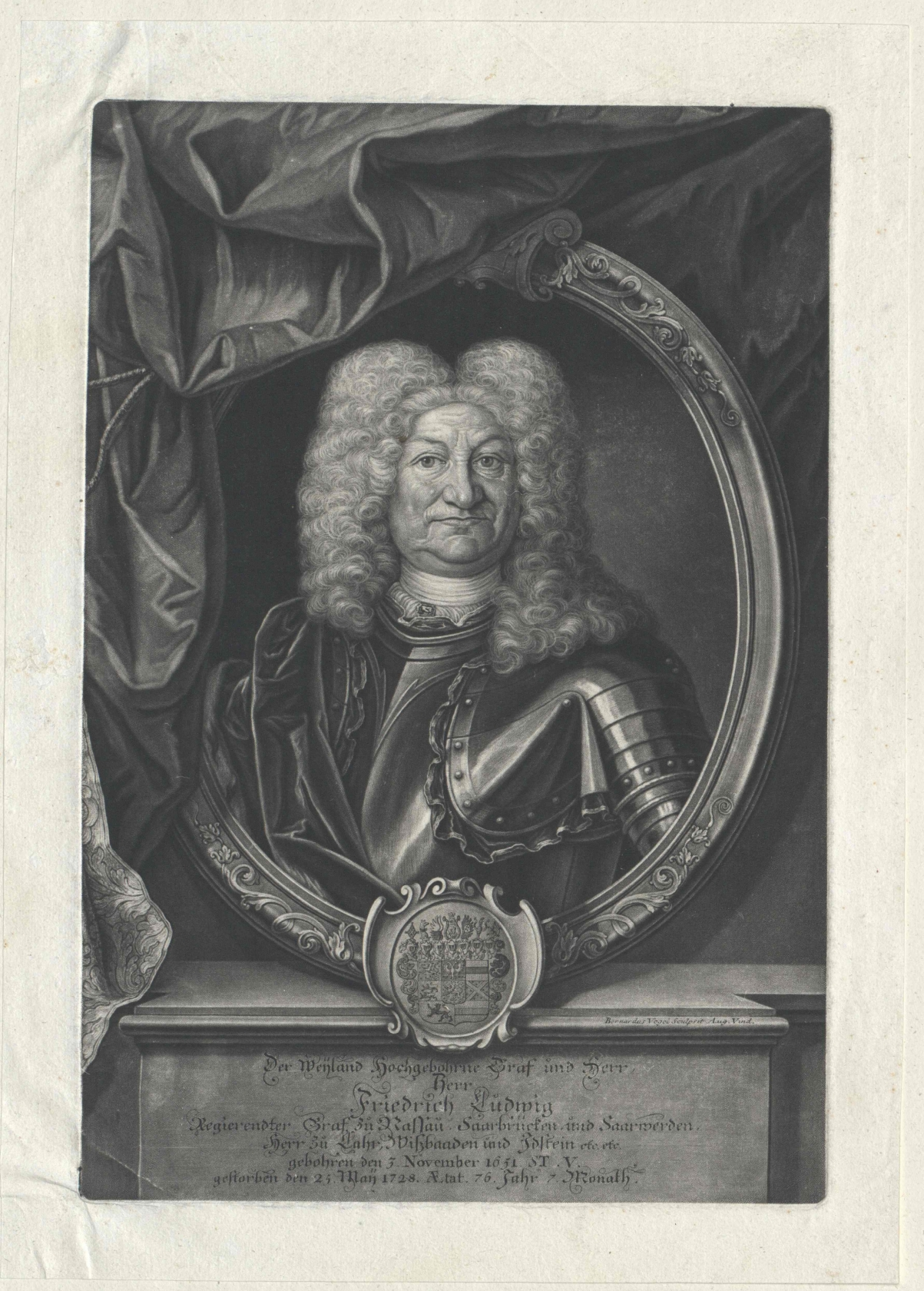
- Born: 13 November 1651; Ottweiler
- Died: 25 May 1728 (aged 76); Saarbrücken
- Noble family: House of Nassau
- Spouses: Christiane of Ahlefeldt-Rixingen; Louise Sophie of Hanau-Lichtenberg
- Father: John Louis, Count of Nassau-Ottweiler
- Mother: Countess Palatine Dorothea Catherine of Birkenfeld-Bischweiler

Frederick Louis of Nassau-Ottweiler (13 November 1651 – 25 May 1728) was a member of the House of Nassau.

== Biography ==
He was born in Ottweiler, the son of John Louis, Count of Nassau-Ottweiler and Countess Palatine Dorothea Catherine of Birkenfeld-Bischweiler. He was Count of Nassau-Ottweiler from 1680 until his death. From 1721, he was also Count of Nassau-Idstein; from 1723 also Count of Nassau-Saarbrücken. When he died in Saarbrücken, without a male heir, his territories fell to his cousin Charles of Nassau-Usingen after his death in 1728.

== Family ==
Frederick Louis married on 28 July 1680 with Countess Christiane von Ahlefeldt (1659–95), the daughter of Count Friedrich von Ahlefeldt and his first wife Countess Margarethe Dorothea zu Rantzau (1642-1665). They had eight daughters:

- Dorothea Friederike (1681–1691)
- Charlotte Marie (1684–1690)
- Christiane Charlotte (1685–1761), married first Charles Louis, Count of Nassau-Saarbrücken; secondly Frederick III, Landgrave of Hesse-Homburg
- Louise (1686–1773), married Charles, Wild- and Rhinegrave of Salm-Dhaun (1675–1733)
- Sophia Amalia (1688–1753), married Georg Friedrich, Burggraf von Kirchberg zu Hachenburg (1683–1749)
- Maria (1690–1714)
- Dorothea (1692–1740), married Walrad, Wild- and Rhinegrave of Salm-Dhaun (1686–1730)
- Eleonore (1693–1693)

After Christiane's death, Frederick Louis married on 27 September 1697 Countess Louise Sophie of Hanau-Lichtenberg (11 April 1662 in Bischofsheim am Hohen Steg – 9 April 1751 in Ottweiler), the daughter of Johann Reinhard II of Hanau-Lichtenberg and Countess Palatine Anna Magdalena of Birkenfeld-Bischweiler. This marriage produced one child, a stillborn son, in 1698.

== Ancestry ==
Ancestors of Frederick Louis, Count of Nassau-Ottweiler

8. Louis II, Count of Nassau-Weilburg
4. William Louis, Count of Nassau-Saarbrücken
9. Anna Maria of Hesse-Kassel
2. John Louis, Count of Nassau-Ottweiler
10. Georg Friedrich, Margrave of Baden-Durlach
5. Anna Amalia of Baden-Durlach
11. Juliana Ursula of Salm-Neuville
1. Frederick Louis, Count of Nassau-Ottweiler
12. Charles I, Count Palatine of Zweibrücken-Birkenfeld
6. Christian I, Count Palatine of Birkenfeld-Bischweiler
13. Dorothea of Brunswick-Lüneburg
3. Dorothea Catherine of Birkenfeld-Bischweiler
14. John II, Count Palatine of Zweibrücken
7. Magdalene Catherine of Zweibrücken
15. Catherine de Rohan

Frederick Louis, Count of Nassau-Ottweiler House of Nassau Born: 13 November 1651 Died: 25 May 1728
Preceded by John Louis	Count of Nassau-Ottweiler; 1680-1728	Succeeded by Charles
Preceded by George August	Count of Nassau-Idstein; 1721-1728	Succeeded by Charles
Preceded by Charles Louis	Count of Nassau-Saarbrücken; 1723-1728	Succeeded by Charles
