= Salm (state) =

Historic counties and principalities

County (Counties) of Salm Grafschaft(en) Salm
- 1019–1815
- Flag Coat of Arms (1019–1355)
- Status: State of the Holy Roman Empire, then State of the Confederation of the Rhine
- Capital: Vielsalm (originally)
- Government: Principality
- Historical era: Middle Ages
  - Partitioned from County of Saarbrücken: 1019
  - First partitioned into Lower and Upper Salm: 1165
  - Lower Salm extinct; to Reifferscheid-Dyck: 1416
  - Part of Upper Salm to Wild- and Rhinegraves: 1475
  - Annexed to Imperial département of Lippe: 1810–11
  - Mediatised to Prussia: 1815
Preceded by	Succeeded by
County of Saarbrücken	Kingdom of Prussia

Salm is the name of several historic countships and principalities in present Germany, Belgium, Luxembourg and France.

== History ==
=== Origins and first division ===
The County of Salm arose in the tenth century in Vielsalm, in the Ardennes region of present Belgium. It was ruled by a junior branch of the House of Ardenne–Luxembourg, called the House of Salm.

In 1165, it was divided into the counties of Lower Salm, in the Ardennes, situated in Belgium and Luxembourg, and the county of Upper Salm, situated in the Vosges mountains, present France.

=== Upper Salm ===
In 1246 the County of Upper Salm was split up, and the County of Salm-Blankenburg came into existence, next to it.

In 1431 the County of Upper Salm was split up again, and the County of Salm-Badenweiler came into existence, next to it.

The County of Upper Salm was inherited by the Wild- and Rhinegraves in 1475, who then called their fief the Wild- and Rhinegraviate of Upper Salm.

In 1499 the Wild- and Rhinegraviate of Salm was divided up into two entities, the Wild- and Rhinegraviate of Salm-Kyrburg and the Wild- and Rhinegraviate of Salm-Dhaun.

==== Salm-Blankenburg ====
The county became extinct in 1506, and was inherited by the House of Lorraine.

==== Salm-Badenweiler ====
In 1520 the County of Salm-Badenweiler was split up, and the County of Salm-Neuburg came into existence, next to it. In 1653 the fief was inherited by the Austrian House of Sinzendorf, but the House of Salm kept using the title until 1784, when the last lord died.

The county was annexed by the House of Lorraine from 1600 until 1608, when it came back into the family. 1670 the territory was finally annexed by France.

==== Salm-Brandenbourg ====
In 1490, Anne d'Haraucourt, Dame of Brandenbourg (1465–1550) married Count Johann VI of Salm (1452–1505). As the only child of her parents, she inherited Brandenbourg and brought it into the House of Salm. It was first inherited by her childless grandson, Count Claudius of Salm (d. 1583), who left the territory to his younger brother, Count Paul of Salm (d. 1595). His only surviving child, Christina of Salm, was his sole heir. In 1600, she also inherited Badenweiler possessions of her uncle. After that, a division took place: some of her possessions were kept with her and later inherited by the House of Lorraine; another half was kept within the House of Salm. From this Salm half later emerged the Principality of Salm.

==== Salm-Kyrburg ====
In 1607 the Wild- and Rhinegraviate of Salm-Kyrburg was divided in three by splitting off the Wild- and Rhinagraviate of Salm-Mörchingen and the Wild- and Rhinagraviate of Salm-Tronecken from the original Wild- and Rhinegraviate. In 1637 the lord of Salm-Tronecken died and his territories were joined with ... . In 1681 the last lord of Salm-Kyrburg died, and his territories were joined with Salm-Mörchingen.

In 1688 the last lord of Salm-Mörchingen died. His territories were joined with ... .

In 1743 a completely new territory of Salm-Kyrburg was created, this time the Principality of Salm-Kyrburg. It was shortly annexed by France in 1811 and mediatised in 1813. But the family kept using the titles.

==== Salm-Dhaun ====
In 1561 the Wild- and Rhinegraviate of Salm-Neuweiler and the Wild- and Rhinegraviate of Salm-Grumbach were split off Salm-Dhaun.

In 1697 the Wild- and Rhinegraviate of Salm-Püttlingen was split off Salm-Dhaun.

In 1748 the Salm-Dhaun branch of the family became extinct, its territories went to the branch of Salm-Püttlingen.

===== Salm-Püttlingen =====
Salm-Püttlingen became extinct in 1750. Their territories passed to Salm-Dhaun. Caroline of Salm was the heiress and, after her, her grandson Dominic Constantine, Prince of Löwenstein-Wertheim-Rochefort.

===== Salm-Neuweiler =====
In 1610 the Wild- and Rhinegraviate of Salm was split off Salm-Neuweiler. It was elevated to the Principality of Salm in 1623.

In 1803, when the Bishopric of Münster was secularized, part of it was given to the princes of Salm-Salm who by then already were in possession of the Lordship of Anholt. This new Principality of Salm, covering the area around Borken, Ahaus and Bocholt, was a member of the Confederation of the Rhine. In 1810 it was annexed by France, as a part of the Imperial département of Lippe. After the defeat of Napoleon in 1815, it was mediatized to Prussia. The family branch exist until today.

In 1696 Salm-Neuweiler was divided in two, the Wild- and Rhinegraviate of Salm-Leuze and the Wild- and Rhinegraviate of Salm-Hoogstraten. Their lands were incorporated into Belgium. The branches became extinct in 1887 and 1186.

===== Salm-Grumbach =====
In 1668 the Wild- and Rhinegraviate of Rheingrafenstein-Grenzweiler was split off Salm-Grumbach. It was mediatised and incorporated into Prussia. The branch extinction occurred in 1819.

In 1803 Salm-Grumbach was annexed by France. The lords of Salm-Grumbach received the Principality of Salm-Horstmar as compensation in 1803. It was mediatised in 1813. The family branch sold its titles to Salm-Salm in 1892.

== List of states ==
- 1019–1165 : County of Salm (Lower and Upper Salm)
  - 1165–1416 : County of Lower Salm / 1416–1628 : County of Salm-Reifferscheid / 1628-1639 Altgraviate of Salm-Reifferscheid
    - 1639–1803 : Altgraviate of Salm-Reifferscheid-Bedburg
      - 1803–1804 : Altgraviate of Salm-Reifferscheid-Krautheim
        - 1804–1806 : Principality of Salm-Reifferscheid-Krautheim (mediatised to Prussia, branch became extinct in 1893)
      - 1734–1790 : County of Salm-Reifferscheid-Raitz
        - 1790–1811 : Principality of Salm-Reifferscheid-Raitz (mediatised to Austria, branch still extant)
      - 1734–1811 : County of Salm-Reifferscheid-Hainsbach (mediatised to Prussia, branch became extinct in 1897)
    - 1639–1806 : Altgraviate of Salm-Reifferscheid-Dyck (mediatised to Prussia, branch became extinct in 1888)
  - 1165–1475 : County of Upper Salm / 1475-1499 : Wild- and Rhinegraviate of Upper Salm (House of Salm-Dhaun and House of Salm-Kyrburg)
    - 1210–1500 : County of Salm-Blankenburg (House of Lorraine)
    - 1431–1670 : County of Salm-Badenweiler (House of Bourbon)
      - 1490–1600 :County of Salm-Brandenbourg (House of Lorraine and House of Salm)
      - 1520–1784 : County of Salm-Neuburg (House of Sinzendorf)
    - 1499–1748 : Wild- and Rhinegraviate of Salm-Dhaun (House of Salm-Püttlingen)
      - 1697–1750 : Wild- and Rhinegraviate of Salm-Püttlingen (?)
      - 1561–1696 : Wild- and Rhinegraviate of Salm-Neuweiler (House of Salm-Leuze and House of Salm-Hoogstraten)
        - 1574-1738 : Wild- and Rhinegraviate of Salm-Salm
          - 1738–1810 : Principality of Salm-Salm (mediatised to Prussia)
        - 1696–1742 : Wild- and Rhinegraviate of Salm-Leuze
          - 1742–1743 : Principality of Salm-Leuze (House of Salm-Kyrburg)
        - 1696–1738 : Wild- and Rhinegraviate of Salm-Hoogstraten (later known as House of Salm-Salm)
      - 1561–1803 : Wild- and Rhinegraviate of Salm-Grumbach (mediatised to Prussia)
        - 1803–1813 : Principality of Salm-Horstmar (mediatised to Prussia, branch still extant)
        - 1668-????' Wild- and Rhinegraviate of Rheingrafenstein-Grenzweiler (branch became extinct in 1819)
    - 1499–1681 : Wild- and Rhinegraviate of Salm-Kyrburg (House of Salm-Mörchingen)
      - 1607-1637 : Wild and Rhinegraviate of Salm-Tronecken (branch became extinct in 1637)
      - 1607–1688 : Wild- and Rhinegraviate Salm-Mörchingen (branch became extinct in 1688)
    - 1743–1810 : Principality of Salm-Kyrburg (mediatised to Prussia)

== Rulers ==
=== House of Salm ===
Partitions of Salm under Salm rule

County of Salm (separated from the County of Luxembourg) (1019–1170)									County of Bentheim-Rheineck (1088–1176)
								County of Lower Salm (Salm-en-Ardennes) female-branch of Salm-Vianden (1170–1416)	County of Bentheim-Rheineck (1088–1176)
								County of Lower Salm (Salm-en-Ardennes) female-branch of Salm-Vianden (1170–1416)	Annexed to the County of Holland
							County of Salm-Blâmont (1246–1503)	County of Lower Salm (Salm-en-Ardennes) female-branch of Salm-Vianden (1170–1416)	Annexed to the County of Holland
							County of Salm-Blâmont (1246–1503)	Inherited by the Reifferscheidt family, which adopted the name Salm-Reifferscheidt	Annexed to the County of Holland
County of Puttlingen (1343–1368)	County of Upper Salm (Salm-en-Vosges) male main line of Salm (1170–1475)						County of Salm-Blâmont (1246–1503)	Inherited by the Reifferscheidt family, which adopted the name Salm-Reifferscheidt	Annexed to the County of Holland
				County of Badonviller (1475–1627)		County of Neuburg (1485–1654)	County of Salm-Blâmont (1246–1503)	Inherited by the Reifferscheidt family, which adopted the name Salm-Reifferscheidt	Annexed to the County of Holland
	County of Dhaun (1569–1750)			County of Badonviller (1475–1627)		County of Neuburg (1485–1654)	County of Salm-Blâmont (1246–1503)	Inherited by the Reifferscheidt family, which adopted the name Salm-Reifferscheidt	Annexed to the County of Holland
	County of Dhaun (1569–1750)			County of Badonviller (1475–1627)		County of Neuburg (1485–1654)	Annexed to the Duchy of Lorraine	Inherited by the Reifferscheidt family, which adopted the name Salm-Reifferscheidt	Annexed to the County of Holland
	County of Grumbach (1569–1803)	County of Neuviller (1569–1681)		County of Badonviller (1475–1627)		County of Neuburg (1485–1654)	Annexed to the Duchy of Lorraine	Inherited by the Reifferscheidt family, which adopted the name Salm-Reifferscheidt	Annexed to the County of Holland
County of Morchingen (1607–1718)	County of Grumbach (1569–1803)	County of Neuviller (1569–1681)	County of Kyrburg (female branch) (1475–1742)	County of Badonviller (1475–1627)		County of Neuburg (1485–1654)	Annexed to the Duchy of Lorraine	Inherited by the Reifferscheidt family, which adopted the name Salm-Reifferscheidt	Annexed to the County of Holland
County of Morchingen (1607–1718)	County of Grumbach (1569–1803)	County of Neuviller (1569–1681)	County of Kyrburg (female branch) (1475–1742)	Half of Badonviller raised to: Principality of Salm (Neuviller branch) (1623–1738)	Half of Badonviller annexed to the Duchy of Lorraine	County of Neuburg (1485–1654)	Annexed to the Duchy of Lorraine	Inherited by the Reifferscheidt family, which adopted the name Salm-Reifferscheidt	Annexed to the County of Holland
County of Morchingen (1607–1718)	County of Grumbach (1569–1803)	County of Neuviller (1569–1681)	County of Kyrburg (female branch) (1475–1742)	Half of Badonviller raised to: Principality of Salm (Neuviller branch) (1623–1738)	Half of Badonviller annexed to the Duchy of Lorraine	Sold to the Sinzendorf family	Annexed to the Duchy of Lorraine	Inherited by the Reifferscheidt family, which adopted the name Salm-Reifferscheidt	Annexed to the County of Holland
Annexed to the Duchy of Lorraine (1718-1729); Annexed to the Electoral Palatinate	County of Grumbach (1569–1803)	(Neuviller branch from 1681) Raised to: Principality of Salm-Kyrburg (1742–1813)	County of Leuze (1707–1742)	Half of Badonviller raised to: Principality of Salm (Neuviller branch) (1623–1738)	Half of Badonviller annexed to the Duchy of Lorraine	Sold to the Sinzendorf family	Annexed to the Duchy of Lorraine	Inherited by the Reifferscheidt family, which adopted the name Salm-Reifferscheidt	Annexed to the County of Holland
Annexed to the Duchy of Lorraine (1718-1729); Annexed to the Electoral Palatinate	Exchanged (by France) with: Principality of Salm-Horstmar (1803–1813)	(Neuviller branch from 1681) Raised to: Principality of Salm-Kyrburg (1742–1813)	Raised to: Principality of Salm-Salm (1742–1815)		Half of Badonviller annexed to the Duchy of Lorraine	Sold to the Sinzendorf family	Annexed to the Duchy of Lorraine	Inherited by the Reifferscheidt family, which adopted the name Salm-Reifferscheidt	Annexed to the County of Holland
Annexed to the Duchy of Lorraine (1718-1729); Annexed to the Electoral Palatinate	(mediatized to Prussia in 1813)	(mediatized to Prussia in 1813)	Annexed to France (1811) (mediatized to Prussia in 1813)		Half of Badonviller annexed to the Duchy of Lorraine	Sold to the Sinzendorf family	Annexed to the Duchy of Lorraine	Inherited by the Reifferscheidt family, which adopted the name Salm-Reifferscheidt	Annexed to the County of Holland

Table of rulers

Ruler	Born	Reign	Ruling part	Consort	Death	Notes
Giselbert	c.1007 Son of Frederick of Luxembourg, Count of Moselgau and Ermentrude of Gleiberg	1019 - 14 August 1059	County of Salm	Unknown seven children	14 August 1059 aged 51–52	Also Count of Luxembourg.
Herman I	c.1035 Son of Giselbert	14 August 1059 - 28 September 1088	County of Salm	Sophia of Formbach three children	28 September 1088; Cochem aged 52–53	Contested the Imperial throne against Henry IV, Holy Roman Emperor.
Otto I	c.1075 First son of Herman I and Sophia of Formbach	28 September 1088 - 1150	County of Bentheim and Rheineck	Gertrude of Northeim c.1115 three children	c.1150 aged 74–75	Children of Herman I, divided the land.
Herman II	c.1075 Second son of Herman I and Sophia of Formbach	28 September 1088 - 11 July 1135	County of Salm	Agnes of Bar c.1110 three children	11 July 1135 aged 59–60	Children of Herman I, divided the land.
Henry I	c.1110 First son of Herman II and Agnes of Bar	11 July 1135 - 1170	County of Salm	Clementia of Dagsburg two children	1170 aged 59–60	Children of Herman I, possibly ruled jointly.
Herman III	c.1110 Second son of Herman II and Agnes of Bar	11 July 1135 - c.1150?	County of Salm	Mathilde de Paroy no children	c.1150? aged 39–40?	Children of Herman I, possibly ruled jointly.
Sophia	c.1120 Daughter of Herman I and Sophia of Formbach	1150 - 26 September 1176	County of Bentheim and Rheineck	Gertrude of Northeim c.1115 three children	26 September 1176; Jerusalem aged 55–56	Heir of her father after his death. through her marriage, her property passed to the House of Holland.
Bentheim-Rheineck annexed to the County of Holland
Henry II	c.1140 Son of Henry I and Clementia of Dagsburg	1170-1204	County of Upper Salm (Salm-en-Vosges)	Judith (d.1186)c.1150 four/five children	c.1204 aged 63–64	Children of Henry I, divided the county.
Elisabeth	c.1140 Daughter of Henry I and Clementia of Dagsburg	1170-c.1200	County of Lower Salm (Salm-en-Ardennes)	Frederick II, Count of Vianden; 1159 four children	c.1200 aged 59–60	Children of Henry I, divided the county.
William I	c.1160 Son of Frederick II, Count of Vianden and Elisabeth	c.1200 - 5 September 1214	County of Lower Salm	Unknown three children	5 September 1214 aged 53–54	
Henry III	c.1175 Son of Henry II and Judith	1204 - August 1246	County of Upper Salm	Judith of Upper Lorraine (d.c.1245); 1189 seven children	August 1246 aged 70–71?	
Henry II	c.1180 First son of William I	c.1215	County of Lower Salm	Unknown at least one child?	c.1215/20? aged c.39-40?	
Gerhard	c.1180 Second son of William I	c.1215-1240	County of Lower Salm	Unknown at least one child?	1240 aged c.59-60	
Henry III	c.1200 Son of Henry II or Gerhard	1240-1246	County of Lower Salm	Unknown at least one child	1246 aged 45–46	
Henry IV	c.1230 Son of Henry of Salm, Lord of Viviers and Margaret of Bar	August 1246 - 8 January 1292	County of Upper Salm	Lauretta of Blieskastel; 1242 four children	8 January 1292 aged 61–62	Division of land: Frederick, son of Henry III, took Blâmont for himself; Henry IV, Henry III's grandson, inherited the rest of the county.
Frederick I	c.1220 Son of Henry III and Judith of Upper Lorraine	August 1246 - 1255	County of Salm-Blâmont	Jeanne de Dombasle (d.c.1240) c.1225 one child Jeanne of Bar (d.c.1300) c.1250 two children	1255 aged 34–35	Division of land: Frederick, son of Henry III, took Blâmont for himself; Henry IV, Henry III's grandson, inherited the rest of the county.
Henry IV	c.1220 Son of Henry III	1246-1259	County of Lower Salm	Clementia of Rozoy (c.1195-1285) c.1225 two children	1259 aged 38–39	
Regency of Jeanne of Bar (1255-1269)						
Henry I Strong-Head	1242 or 1255; Son of Frederick I and Jeanne of Bar	1255 - 1331	County of Salm-Blâmont	Kunigunde of Leiningen (1259-c.1310) c.1265 eight children	1331 aged 75–76 or 88-89	
William II	c.1240 Son of Henry IV and Clementia of Rozoy	1259-1292	County of Lower Salm	Richardis of Julich (c.1243-c.1295); 1265 at least two children	1292 aged 51–52	
John I	c.1250 Son of Henry IV and Lauretta of Blieskastel	8 January 1292 -c.1330	County of Upper Salm	Jeanne de Joinville (1266-c.1300); 1290 five children	c.1330 aged c.79-80?	
William III	c.1260 Son of William II and Richardis of Julich	1292-1297	County of Lower Salm	Catherine of Prouvy c.1280 five children	1297 aged 36–37	
Henry V	c.1280 Son of William III and Catherine of Prouvy	1297-1333	County of Lower Salm	Philippa of Grandpré c.1280 four children	1333 aged 59–60	
Simon I	c.1290 Son of John I and Jeanne of Joinville	c.1330 - 26 July 1346	County of Upper Salm	Matilda of Saarbrücken; 1334 one child	26 July 1346; Battle of Crécyaged c.55-56	
Henry II	c.1310 First son of Henry of Salm-Blâmont and Margaret of Montfaucon	1331 - 1342	County of Salm-Blâmont	Unmarried	1342 aged 31–32	Grandson of Henry I, left no descendants.
William IV	c.1300 First son of Henry V and Philippa of Grandpré	1334	County of Lower Salm	Unmarried	1334 aged 33–34	Left no descendants. He was succeeded by his brother.
John I	c.1300 Second son of Henry V and Philippa of Grandpré	1334-1336	County of Lower Salm	Unmarried	1336 aged 35–36?	Left no descendants. He was succeeded by his brother.
Henry VI	1315; Third son of Henry V and Philippa of Grandpré	1336-1360	County of Lower Salm	Mathilde of Thuin c.1345 two children	1360 aged 59–60	
Theobald I	c.1310 Second son of Henry of Salm-Blâmont and Margaret of Montfaucon	1342 - April/May 1376	County of Salm-Blâmont	Margaret d’Oricourt (1259-c.1310); 21 July 1346 seven children	April/May 1376 aged 75–76 or 88-89	Brother of Henry II.
John II	c.1335 Son of Simon I and Matilda of Saarbrücken	26 July 1346 - c.1400	County of Upper Salm	Margaret c.1350 no children Philippa of Falkenburg (1340–1385); 23 May 1355 fou children	c.1400 aged c.64-65	In 1396 John possibly associated his son to the rulership, as despite having predeceased him, Simon was by 1396 already Lord of Born, Sittard, Ravenstein and Susteren.
Simon II	c.1355 First son of John II and Philippa of Falkenburg	1396 - 16 January 1397	County of Upper Salm	Unmarried	16 January 1397 aged 63–64	In 1396 John possibly associated his son to the rulership, as despite having predeceased him, Simon was by 1396 already Lord of Born, Sittard, Ravenstein and Susteren.
John II	c.1350 First son of Henry VI and Mathilde of Thuin	1360-c.1380	County of Lower Salm	Unmarried	c.1380 aged 29–30	Left no descendants. He was succeeded by his brother.
Henry III	c.1350 Son of Theobald I and Margaret d’Oricourt	April/May 1376 - 1421	County of Salm-Blâmont	Walpurga of Vinstingen (d.c.1425); 1369/70 six children	1421 aged c.70-71	
Henry VII	c.1350 Second son of Henry VI and Mathilde of Thuin	c.1380-1416	County of Lower Salm	Philippa Mascherell van Schoonvorst; 1366 three children	1416 aged 65–66	
Lower Salm inherited by the Reifferscheidt family (see below the table)
John III	c.1370 Second son of John II and Philippa of Falkenburg	c.1400 - 2 July 1431	County of Upper Salm	Guillemette de Vergy (d.1412); 1403 one child Jeanne Alix de Joinville; 1422 one child	2 July 1431; Bulgneville aged 60–61	
Theobald II	c.1370 Son of Henry III and Walpurga of Vinstingen	1421- 2 September 1431	County of Salm-Blâmont	Margaret of Vaudémont (d.c.1470); 1415 six children	2 September 1431 aged 75–76 or 88-89	
Simon III	c.1405 Son of John III and Guillemette de Vergy	2 July 1431 - 1475	County of Upper Salm	Jeanne van Rotselaer (c.1430 - 2 Aug 1487) c.1420 two children	1475 aged 69–70	
Frederick II	c.1415 First son of Theobald II and Margaret of Vaudémont	2 September 1431 - 1494	County of Salm-Blâmont	Marie de Vienne, Lady of Saint-Georges c.1450 eight children	1494 aged c.78-79	
Jacob	c.1420 Son of Simon III and Jeanne van Rotselaer	1475	County of Upper Salm	Unmarried	1475 aged 54–55	Left no descendants.
John IV	c.1405 Son of John III and Jeanne Alix de Joinville	1475 - 14 June 1485	County of Salm-Badonviller	Margarete of Sirck (1437-12 February 1520) four children	14 June 1485 aged 63–64	Uncle and niece (or according to some sources, brother and sister), divided the county. John founded the Badonviller branch, and Johannetta the Salm-Kyrburg branch.
Johannetta	c.1420 Daughter of Simon III and Jeanne van Rotselaer	1475-1496	County of Salm-Kyrburg	John V, Rheingraf of Stein and Dhaun (17 November 1436 - September 1495); 14 November 1459 four children	1496 aged 75–76	Uncle and niece (or according to some sources, brother and sister), divided the county. John founded the Badonviller branch, and Johannetta the Salm-Kyrburg branch.
John V	1451; First son of John IV and Margarete of Sirck	14 June 1485 - 11 April 1505	County of Salm-Badonviller	Anne de Haraucourt (1465-14 May 1550) four children	11 April 1505 aged 53–54	Children of John IV, divided the land.
Nicholas I	1459; Vielsalm; Second son of John IV and Margarete of Sirck	14 June 1485 - 4 May 1530	County of Salm-Neuburg	Elisabeth von Rogendorff (d.1550); 18 June 1502 eight children	4 May 1530; Marchegg aged 70–71	Children of John IV, divided the land.
Claude	c.1450 First son of Frederick II and Marie de Vienne	1494 - 4 July 1496	County of Salm-Blâmont	Unknown at least one child	4 July 1496 aged 45–46	
Louis	c.1450 Second son of Frederick II and Marie de Vienne	4 July 1496 - 1503	County of Salm-Blâmont	Bonne de Neuchâtel no children	1503 aged 52–53	
John VI	c.1460 Son of John V, Rheingraf of Stein and Dhaun and Johannetta	1496 - 27 December 1499	County of Salm-Kyrburg	Joanna, Countess of Moers and Saarwerden (d.1513); 17 November 1478 seven children	27 December 1499 aged 38–39	
Philip	8 September 1492; First son of John VI and Joanna of Moers and Saarwerden	27 December 1499 - 27 August 1521	County of Salm-Dhaun	Antoinette de Neufchatel (c. 1495/1500 - 29 October 1544); 31 May 1514; Amanck four children	27 August 1521; Yvoir aged 28	Children of John VI, divided the county.
John VII	1493; Second son of John VI and Joanna of Moers and Saarwerden	27 December 1499 - 11 December 1531	County of Salm-Kyrburg	Anna of Isenburg-Ronneburg; 9 January 1515 eight children	11 December 1531 aged 37–38	Children of John VI, divided the county.
Ulrich	c.1425 Second son of Theobald II and Margaret of Vaudémont	1503 - 3 May 1506	County of Salm-Blâmont	Unmarried	3 May 1506 aged 80–81	Uncle of Claude and Louis, also Bishop of Toul. After his childless death Blâmont was annexed to Lorraine.
Blâmont annexed to the Duchy of Lorraine
John VI	c.1495 Salm; Son of John V and Anne de Haraucourt	11 April 1505 - 15 March 1548	County of Salm-Badonviller	Louise de Stainville (1500 - 6 May 1554) four children	15 March 1548 aged 51–52	
Regency of Antoinette de Neufchatel (1521-1532)						
Philip Francis	4 August 1518; Dhaun; Son of Philip and Antoinette de Neufchatel	27 August 1521 - 28 January 1561	County of Salm-Dhaun	Maria Aegyptiaca of Oettingen-Oettingen; 27 January 1539 nine children	28 January 1561; Naumburg aged 42	
Nicholas II	1503; Son of Nicholas I and Elisabeth von Regendorff	4 May 1530 - 15 June 1550	County of Salm-Neuburg	Emiliana of Eberstein; 28 October 1524 two children Margareta Széchy of Felsőlendva; 8 September 1540 one child	15 June 1550; Eger aged 46–47	
Regency of Anna of Isenburg-Ronneburg (1531-1536)						
John VIII	1522; Son of John VII and Anna of Isenburg-Ronneburg	11 December 1531 - October 1548	County of Salm-Kyrburg	Anna of Hohenlohe-Waldenburg (1520 - 7 March 1594); 14 January 1540; Waldenburg three children	October 1548 aged 25–26	
John VII	c.1520 Son of John VI and Louise de Stainville	15 March 1548 - 14 January 1600	County of Salm-Badonviller	Unmarried	14 January 1600 aged 63–64	
Regency of Anna of Hohenlohe-Waldenburg (1548-1555)						
Otto I the Elder	15 January 1541? Son of John VIIIand Anna of Hohenlohe-Waldenburg	October 1548 - 7 June 1607	County of Salm-Kyrburg	Ottilia of Nassau-Weilburg; 23 June 1567; Weilburg thirteen children	7 June 1607; Kyrburg aged 66?	
Nicholas III	1528; First son of Nicholas II and Emiliana of Eberstein	15 June 1550 - 26 November 1580	County of Salm-Neuburg	Catherine of Isenburg-Büdingen (11 April 1532 - 16 April 1574); 1562 no children Judith of Polheim (5 March 1559 - 1613); 1575 no children	26 November 1580 aged 70–71	
John Philip I	30 September 1545; First son of Philip Francis and Maria Aegyptiaca of Oettingen-Oettingen	28 January 1561 - 3 October 1569	County of Salm-Dhaun	Diana de Dompmartin (1552–1625); 1566 no children	3 October 1569 aged 24	Left no children. His brothers split the patrimony.
Frederick I	3 February 1547; Dhaun; Second son of Philip Francis and Maria Aegyptiaca of Oettingen-Oettingen	3 October 1569 - 26 October 1608	County of Salm-Neuviller	Francisca of Salm-Badenweiler (1545 - 22 May 1587); 10 April 1570 six children Anna Emilia of Nassau-Weilburg (26 July 1549 - 7 January 1598); 27 May 1588; Saarbrücken no children Sybilla Juliana of Isenburg-Birstein (29 January 1574 - 2 May 1604); 15 July 1598; Birstein five children Anna Amalia of Erbach; 21 October 1604; Erbach im Odenwald three children	26 October 1608; Finstingen aged 61	Siblings of John Philip I, divided the county. Frederick inherited (possibly already in 1600) half of the County of Salm-Badonviller.
John Christopher	20 October 1555; Third son of Philip Francis and Maria Aegyptiaca of Oettingen-Oettingen	3 October 1569 - 3 August 1585	County of Salm-Grumbach	Dorothea of Mansfeld-Eisleben (1549–1626); 1581 two children	3 August 1585 aged 29	Siblings of John Philip I, divided the county. Frederick inherited (possibly already in 1600) half of the County of Salm-Badonviller.
Adolph Henry	1557; Fourth son of Philip Francis and Maria Aegyptiaca of Oettingen-Oettingen	3 October 1569 - 20 February 1606	County of Salm-Dhaun	Juliana of Nassau-Siegen; 24 April 1588 ten children	20 February 1606 aged 49	Siblings of John Philip I, divided the county. Frederick inherited (possibly already in 1600) half of the County of Salm-Badonviller.
Julius I	11 November 1531; Second son of Nicholas II and Emiliana of Eberstein	26 November 1580 - 2 July 1595	County of Salm-Neuburg	Elisabeth Thurzó of Bethlenfalva (d.29 November 1573) c.1570 no children Anna Maria of Dietrichstein (7 December 1557 - 5 March 1586); 1575 one child	2 July 1595 aged 63	
Regency of Dorothea of Mansfeld-Eisleben (1585-1596)						
John	1582; Son of John Christopher and Dorothea of Mansfeld-Eisleben	3 August 1585 - 19 January 1630	County of Salm-Grumbach	Anna Juliana of Inner Mansfeld (5 April 1591 - 1626); 3 July 1609 six children	19 January 1630 aged 47–48	
Weichard	16 September 1575; Son of Julius Iand Anna Maria of Dietrichstein	2 July 1595 - 1617	County of Salm-Neuburg	Sidonia von Munchwitz (1579–1638); 26 November 1596 seven children	1617 aged 41–42	
Christina Catharina	1575; Daughter of Paul of Salm-Badenweiler and Marie La Veneur	14 January 1600 - 31 December 1627	County of Salm-Badonviller (in half Badonviller)	Francis II, Duke of Lorraine; 1597 six children	31 December 1627 aged 51–52	Niece of John VII, and Duchess consort of Lorraine. She inherits her uncle's land. A division took place: some of the Badonviller possessions were kept with her and later inherited by Lorraine; another half was kept within the Salm family, specifically of the Dhaun branch. From this Salm half emerged the Principality of Salm.
Half of Badonviller annexed to the Duchy of Lorraine; the other part formed the Principality of Salm
Wolfgang Frederick	1589; Dhaun; Son of Adolph Henry and Juliana of Nassau-Siegen	20 February 1606 - 24 December 1638	County of Salm-Dhaun	Elisabeth of Solms-Braunfels (8 October 1593 - 14 August 1637); 1619 seven children Joanna of Hanau-Münzenberg (12 April 1610 - 26 July 1673); 1637 no children	24 December 1638; Dhaun aged 48–49	
John IX	1575; First son of Otto I and Ottilia of Nassau-Weilburg	7 June 1607 - 1623	County of Salm-Mörchingen	Anna Catharina of Criechingen (d.1638); 15 October 1593 nine children	1623 aged 47–48	Children of Otto I, divided their patrimony.
John Casimir	6 July 1577; Kyrburg; Second son of Otto I and Ottilia of Nassau-Weilburg	7 June 1607 - 4 February 1651	County of Salm-Kyrburg	Dorothea of Solms-Laubach (31 January 1579 - 19 July 1631); 17 May 1607; Laubach eight children Anna Juliana of Leiningen-Hardenburg (1599–1685); 1633 no children	4 February 1651; Kyrburg aged 73	Children of Otto I, divided their patrimony.
Otto II	5 September 1578; Third son of Otto I and Ottilia of Nassau-Weilburg	7 June 1607 - 4 February 1651	County of Salm-Kyrburg (at Dhronecken)	Claudia von Manderscheid-Schleiden (7 October 1581 - 1 January/14 December 1622); 22 November 1614 no children Philippa Barbara von Fleckenstein (d.1637); 21 July 1623 no children	3 April 1637; Strasbourg aged 58	Children of Otto I, divided their patrimony.
Philip Otto	22 May 1575; Dhaun; First son of Frederick I and Francisca of Salm-Badenweiler	26 October 1608 - 23 November 1634	County of Salm-Badonviller (in half Badonviller; 1608–1623) Principality of Salm (1623–1634)	Christine de Croy (1590 - 17 January 1664); 1616 three children	23 November 1634; Neuviller aged 59	Children of Frederick I, divided the county. On 8 January 1623, Ferdinand II, Holy Roman Emperor granted Philip Otto the title of Prince. John George left no male descendants, and his county passed to his half-brother.
John George	1580; Neuviller; Second son of Frederick I and Francisca of Salm-Badenweiler	26 October 1608 - 13 September 1650	County of Salm-Neuviller	Margaret of Inner Mansfeld (August 1592 - 1638); 21 October 1609 two children Anna Maria of Criehingen (7 April 1614 - 7 November 1676); 17 November 1644 no children	13 September 1650 aged 69–70	Children of Frederick I, divided the county. On 8 January 1623, Ferdinand II, Holy Roman Emperor granted Philip Otto the title of Prince. John George left no male descendants, and his county passed to his half-brother.
Julius II	1600; First son of Weichard and Elisabeth von Regendorff	1617 - May 1654	County of Salm-Neuburg	Juliana of Collalto (1625–1647) c.1640? no children Maria Salomea of Windisch-Gretz (d. 28 May 1665) c.1650 one child	May 1654 aged 53–54	
Otto Louis	13 October 1597; First son of John IX and Anna Catharina of Criechingen	1623 - 6 October 1634	County of Salm-Mörchingen	Anna Magdalena of Hanau-Lichtenberg (14 December 1600 - 22 February 1673); 1633 no children	6 October 1634; Speyer aged 36	Children of John IX, ruled jointly.
John X	c.1600 Second son of John IX and Anna Catharina of Criechingen	1623-1634	County of Salm-Mörchingen	Unmarried	1634 aged c.33-34	Children of John IX, ruled jointly.
Adolph	1614; Son of John and Anna Juliana of Inner Mansfeld	19 January 1630 - 16 November 1668	County of Salm-Grumbach	Anna Juliana of Salm-Dhaun (1622–1667); 1640 sixteen children	16 November 1668 aged 53–54	
Louis	1618; First son of Philip Otto and Christine de Croy	23 November 1634 - 1636	Principality of Salm	Unmarried	1636 aged 17–18	Left no descendants; he was succeeded by his brother.
Regency of Anna Magdalena of Hanau-Lichtenberg (1634-1648)						With no descendants, left the county to his wife.
John XI	17 April 1635; Son of Otto Louis and Anna Magdalena of Hanau-Lichtenberg	17 April 1635 - 16 November 1688	County of Salm-Mörchingen	Elisabeth Johanna of Palatinate-Veldenz; 27 December 1669; Mörchingen no children	16 November 1688; Flönheim aged 53	With no descendants, left the county to his wife.
Leopold Philip Charles	1619; Neuviller; Second son of Philip Otto and Christine de Croy	1636 - 15 December 1663	Principality of Salm	Maria Anna of Bronckhorst-Batenburg (4 May 1624 - 16 October 1661); 22 October 1641 three children	15 December 1663; Anholt aged 43–44	
John Louis	1620; Dhaun; Son of Wolfgang Frederick and Elisabeth of Solms-Braunfels	24 December 1638 - 6 November 1673	County of Salm-Dhaun	Elisabeth of Salm-Neuviller (1620–1653); 30 October 1643 five children Eva Dorothea of Hohenlohe-Waldenburg (3 February 1624 - 5 February 1678); 31 August 1649; Neuenstein seven children	6 November 1673; Vienna aged 52–53	
Frederick Magnus	29 July 1606; Neuviller; Son of Frederick I and Anna Amalia of Erbach	13 September 1650 - 25 January 1673	County of Salm-Neuviller	Marguerite Tissard two children	25 January 1673; Maastricht aged 66	
George Frederick	31 May 1611; Son of John Casimir and Dorothea of Solms-Laubach	4 February 1651 - 3 August 1681	County of Salm-Kyrburg	Anna Elisabeth of Stolberg (7 July 1611 - 16 December 1671); 19 February 1638 six children Anna Elisabeth of Daun-Falkenstein; 19 July 1672 no children	3 August 1681 aged 70	Left no male descendants; the county was inherited by the Neufville line of the family.
Charles	1604; Second son of Weichard and Elisabeth von Regendorff	1654	County of Salm-Neuburg	Elisabeth Bernardine of Tübingen; 26 November 1637 ten children	1662 aged 57–58	Sold the county to the Sinzendorf family in the same year of his accession.
Neuburg sold to the Sinzendorf family
Charles Theodore Otto	7 July 1645; Anholt; Son of Leopold Philip Charles and Maria Anna of Bronckhorst-Batenburg	15 December 1663 - 10 November 1710	Principality of Salm	Luise Marie of the Palatinate; 20 March 1671; Asnières-sur-Seine four children	10 November 1710; Aachen aged 65	
George Frederick	4 April 1641; First son of Adolph and Anna Juliana of Salm-Dhaun	16 November 1668 - 1687	County of Salm-Grumbach	Unmarried	1687 aged 45–46	Left no descendants. He was succeeded by his brother.
Charles Florentin	14 January 1638; Neuviller; Son of Frederick Magnus and Marguerite Tissard	25 January 1673 - 4 September 1676	County of Salm-Neuviller	Maria Gabriella of Lalaing (c.1640-1709); 14 September 1657; Maastricht six children	4 September 1676; Pietersheim (close to Lanaken) aged 38	
John Philip II	28 October 1645; Dhaun; Son of John Louis and Elisabeth of Salm-Neuviller	6 November 1673 - 26 June 1693	County of Salm-Dhaun	Anna Catherine of Nassau-Ottweiler; 11 November 1761; Ottweiler seven children	26 June 1693; Dhaun aged 28	
Frederick II	28 December 1658; First son of Charles Florentin and Marie Gabrielle de Lalaing	4 September 1676 - 29 December 1696	County of Salm-Neuviller	Brigitte Louise de Rubempré (d.15 August 1730) no children	29 December 1696 aged 38	Left no descendants. His brothers split the patrimony.
Frederick II	28 December 1658; First son of Charles Florentin and Marie Gabrielle de Lalaing	3 August 1681 - 29 December 1696	County of Salm-Kyrburg	Brigitte Louise de Rubempré (d.15 August 1730) no children	29 December 1696 aged 38	Left no descendants. His brothers split the patrimony.
Leopold Philip William	26 December 1642; Second son of Adolph and Anna Juliana of Salm-Dhaun	1687 - 25 August 1719	County of Salm-Grumbach	Frederica Juliana of Salm-Kyrburg (9 October 1651 - 7 February 1705); 23 September 1673 three children	25 August 1719 aged 76	
Elisabeth Johanna of Palatinate-Veldenz	22 February 1653; Lauterrecken; Daughter of Leopold Louis, Count Palatine of Veldenz and Agatha Christine of Hanau-Lichtenberg	16 November 1688 - 5 February 1718	County of Salm-Mörchingen	John XI; 27 December 1669; Mörchingen no children	5 February 1718; Mörchingen aged 64	
Morchingen was annexed to Lorraine (1718-29) and then the Electoral Palatinate
Charles	21 September 1675; Dhaun; First son of John Philip II and Anna Catherine of Nassau-Ottweiler	26 June 1693 - 26 March 1733	County of Salm-Dhaun	Louise of Nassau-Ottweiler; 19 January 1704; Ottweiler ten children	26 March 1733; Dhaun aged 57	
William Florentin	12 May 1670; Second son of Charles Florentin and Marie Gabrielle de Lalaing	29 December 1696 - 6 June 1707	County of Salm-Leuze	Maria Anna of Mansfeld (16 October 1680 - 16 January 1723); 28 September 1699; Vienna one child	6 June 1707 aged 37	Brothers of Frederick II, divided the land between them.
Henry Gabriel	21 July 1674; Third son of Charles Florentin and Marie Gabrielle de Lalaing	29 December 1696 - 15 October 1716	County of Salm-Kyrburg	Marie Therese de Croy (1678 - 18 June 1713); 17 November 1478 seven children	15 October 1716 aged 42	Brothers of Frederick II, divided the land between them.
Nicholas Leopold	25 January 1701; Nancy; Son of William Florentin and Maria Anna of Mansfeld	6 June 1707 - 4 February 1770	County of Salm-Leuze (1696–1742) Principality of Salm-Salm (1742–1770)	Dorothea Franziska Agnes, Princess of Salm (21 February 1702 – 25 January 1751); 25 March 1719; Anholt eighteen children Christina Anna of Salm (29 April 1707 - 19 August 1775); 12 July 1753; Anholt no children	4 February 1770; Hoogstraten aged 69	
Louis Otto	24 October 1674; Aachen; Son of Charles Theodore Otto and Luise Marie of the Palatinate	10 November 1710 - 23 November 1738	Principality of Salm	Albertina Johannetta of Nassau-Hadamar; 20 July 1700; Anholt three children	23 November 1738; Anholt aged 64	
John Dominic	26 July 1708; First son of Henry Gabriel and Marie Therese de Croy	15 October 1716 - 2 June 1778	County of Salm-Kyrburg (1716–1743) Principality of Salm-Kyrburg (1743–1778)	Unmarried	2 June 1778; Kirn aged 69	Children of Henry Gabriel, ruled jointly.
Philip Joseph	21 July 1709; Second son of Henry Gabriel and Marie Therese de Croy	15 October 1716 - 7 June 1779	County of Salm-Kyrburg (1716–1743) Principality of Salm-Kyrburg (1743–1778)	Maria Theresa Josepha of Horn (19 October 1725 - 19 June 1783); 12 August 1742; Ische ten children	7 June 1779; Paris aged 69	Children of Henry Gabriel, ruled jointly.
Charles Louis Philip	27 May 1678; Son of Leopold Philip William and Frederica Juliana of Salm-Kyrburg	25 August 1719 - 1 June 1727	County of Salm-Grumbach	Maria Wilhelmina Henrietta of Nassau-Usingen (13 April 1679 - 1 November 1718); 10 January 1701; Usingen ten children Sophia Dorothea of Nassau-Saarbrücken (14 July 1670 - 21 June 1748); 13 July 1720; Grumbach no children	1 June 1727 aged 49	
Charles Walrad William	10 October 1701; Son of Charles Louis Philip and Maria Wilhelmina Henrietta of Nassau-Usingen	1 June 1727 - 11 July 1763	County of Salm-Grumbach	Juliana Fransisca van Prösing; 13 September 1728; Grumbach seventeen children	11 July 1763 aged 61	
Regency of Louise of Nassau-Ottweiler (1733-1738)						Left no descendants. He was succeeded by his uncle, Christian Otto.
John Philip III	20 January 1724; First son of Charles and Louise of Nassau-Ottweiler	27 March 1733 - 13 September 1742	County of Salm-Dhaun	Unmarried	13 September 1742; Dhaun aged 18	Left no descendants. He was succeeded by his uncle, Christian Otto.
Dorothea Franziska Agnes	21 January 1702; Anholt; Daughter of Louis Otto and Albertina Johannetta of Nassau-Hadamar	23 November 1738 - 25 January 1751	Principality of Salm	Nicholas Leopold; 25 March 1719; Anholt eighteen children	25 January 1751; Anholt aged 49	Heiress of the principality, married Nicholas Leopold, Count of Leuze, who would become later the Prince of Salm-Salm. This princely status, despite being given in 1743 by the Holy Roman Emperor, was recognized by France only after Dorothea's death, in 1751, evidence that until then she may have been recognized as the owner of the principality.
Salm inherited by the County of Leuze
Christian Otto	14 April 1680; Dhaun; Second son of John Philip II and Anna Catherine of Nassau-Ottweiler	13 September 1742 - 24 April 1748	County of Salm-Dhaun	Unmarried	24 April 1748; Dhaun aged 68	Like his nephew, to whom he succeeded, he also didn't marry or had children. The county passed to one of his nephews, son of his brother Walrad.
John Frederick	24 July 1724; Dhaun; Son of Walrad Victor of Salm-Dhaun, Lord of Putlingen and Dorothea of Nassau-Ottweiler	24 April 1748 - 27 January 1750	County of Salm-Dhaun	Carolina Frederica of Salm-Grumbach (4 April 1733 - 23 July 1783); 25 October 1747; Grumbach four children	27 January 1750; Dhaun aged 28	Left no surviving descendants. Dhaun possibly passed to Salm-Salm.
Salm-Dhaun possibly annexed to Salm-Grumbach
Charles Louis William	14 July 1729; Grumbach; Son of Charles Walrad William and Juliana Fransisca van Prösing	11 July 1763 - 23 May 1799	County of Salm-Grumbach	Elisabeth Christiana Marianna of Leiningen-Dagsburg (27 October 1753 - 16 February 1792); 17 May 1768; Hardenburg five children Augusta Louise of Solms-Braunfels (15 January 1764 - 8 September 1797); 3 September 1792; Braunfels two children Frederica Wilhelmina of Sayn-Wittgenstein-Hohenstein (26 March 1767 - 20 December 1849); 22 January 1798 one child	23 May 1799; Wetzlar aged 69	
Louis Charles Otto	22 August 1721; Hoogstraten; Son of Nicholas Leopold and Dorothea Franziska of Salm	4 February 1770 - 29 July 1778	Principality of Salm-Salm	Unmarried	29 July 1778; Senones aged 56	Left no descendants. He was succeeded by his nephew.
Constantine	22 November 1762; Hoogstraten; Son of Maximilian Frederick Ernest of Salm-Salm and Maria Louise of Hesse-Rotenburg	29 July 1778 - 13 December 1810	Principality of Salm-Salm	Victoria Felicitas of Löwenstein-Wertheim -Rochefort (2 January 1769 - 29 November 1786); 31 December 1782; Pütlingen two children Maria Walpurga of Sternberg-Manderscheid (11 May 1770 - 16 June 1806); 4 February 1788; Wiener Neustadt seven children Catharina Bender (19 January 1791 - 13 March 1831); 12 June 1810; The Hague (morganatic) five children	25 February 1828; Karlsruhe aged 65	
Salm-Salm was annexed to France (1810-1815) and then the Kingdom of Prussia
Frederick III	3 May 1744; Son of Philip Joseph and Maria Theresa Josepha of Horn	7 June 1779 - 23 July 1794	Principality of Salm-Kyrburg	Joanna Franziska of Hohenzollern-Sigmaringen; 29 November 1781; Strasbourg four children	23 July 1794 aged 50	
Regency of Amalie Zephyrine of Salm-Kyrburg and [Maurice of Salm-Kyrburg (1794-1810)						Under regency of his aunt and uncle, by the time he reached majority the principality lost its sovereignty.
Frederick IV	14 December 1789; Paris; Son of Frederick III and Joanna Franziska of Hohenzollern-Sigmaringen	23 July 1794 - 13 December 1810	Principality of Salm-Kyrburg	Cécile-Rosalie Prévost; 11 January 1815; Paris one child	14 August 1859; Fontainebleau aged 69	Under regency of his aunt and uncle, by the time he reached majority the principality lost its sovereignty.
Kyrburg was annexed to France (1810-1815) and then the Kingdom of Prussia
Regency of Frederica Wilhelmina of Sayn-Wittgenstein-Hohenstein (1799-1815)						Under regency of his mother; Lost sovereignty after the German mediatization.
William Frederick	11 March 1799; Grumbach; Son of Charles Louis William and Frederica Wilhelmina of Sayn-Wittgenstein-Hohenstein	23 May 1799 - 9 June 1815	County of Salm-Grumbach (1799–1803) Principality of Salm-Horstmar (1803–1813)	Elisabeth Anna Carolina of Solms-Rödelheim (9 June 1806 - 5 February 1885); 5 October 1826; Hungen five children	27 March 1865 aged 66	Under regency of his mother; Lost sovereignty after the German mediatization.
Grumbach annexed to France; Horstmar annexed to the Kingdom of Prussia

=== The successors of the House of Salm: the Reifferscheid family ===
The counts of Lower Salm became extinct in 1416, and the county was inherited by the House of Reifferscheid-Dyck. In 1628 the county was elevated to an altgraviate, and henceforth the fief was renamed the Altgraviate of Salm-Reifferscheid.

In 1639 the Altgraviate was divided up into the Altgraviate of Salm-Reifferscheid-Bedburg, to the Northwest of Cologne, and the Altgraviate of Salm-Reifferscheid-Dyck, Neuss.

House of Reifferscheidt-Dyck (1416–1803; in Dyck, from 1639 in Bedburg, renamed Krautheim 1803–1806)

- Otto (1416–1455)
- John I (1455–1475)
- John II (1475–1479)
- Peter (1479–1505)
- John III (1505–1537)
- John IV (1537–1559)
- Werner (1559–1629)
- Ernst Frederick, (1629–1639) first altgrave
- Ernest Salentin (1639–1684)
- Francis Ernest (1684–1721)
- August Eugene Bernard (1721–1767)
- William (1767–1775)
- Joseph (1775–1806) in pretence until 1861

House of Reifferscheidt-Dyck (in Bedburg 1639–1803, renamed Krautheim 1803–1806)

- Erik Adolf (1639–1673)
- Francis William (1673–1734)
- Charles Anthony (1734–1755)
- Sigismund (1755–1798)
- Francis William, reign (1798–1806) last altgrave (1803–1804), first prince (1804–1806) died 1831

==== Salm-Reifferscheidt-Raitz and Salm-Reifferscheidt-Hainsbach ====
In 1734 the Altgraviate of Salm-Reifferscheid-Bedburg was divided in three by splitting off the Altgraviate of Salm-Reifferscheid-Raitz, from Bohemian descent, and the Altgraviate of Salm-Reifferscheid-Hainsbach from the original altgraviate.

In 1803 the, smaller, Altgraviate of Salm-Reifferscheid-Bedburg was renamed the Altgraviate of Salm-Reifferscheid-Krautheim. In 1804 it was raised to a principality, und existed until 1806, when it was mediatised.

House of Reifferscheid-Dyck (in Raitz 1734–1811)

- Anthony (1734–1769)
- Charles Joseph, last altgrave (1769–1790), first prince (1790–1811)

House of Reifferscheidt-Dyck (in Hainsbach 1734–1811)

- Leopold Anthony (1734–1769)
- Francis Wenceslaus (1769–1811), died 1832

== Titular princes post-Prussian mediatization (1806/11-) ==
=== House of Salm ===
==== Post-mediatized princes of Salm-Kyrburg ====
- Frederick IV, first mediatised prince (1813–1859)
- Frederick V (1859–1887)
- Frederick VI Louis (1887–1905)

==== Post-mediatized princes of Salm-Salm ====
Princely arms of Salm-Salm

- Constantin Alexander, first mediatised prince (1813–1828)
- Florentin (1828–1846)
- Alfred I (1846–1886)
- Nicolas Leopold II (1886–1908)
- Alfred II (1908–1923)
- Nicolas Leopold III (1923–1988)
- Charles-Philip (1988–present)
  - Emanuel, heir (born 1961)

=== House of Reifferscheidt ===
==== Post-mediatized princes of Salm-Reifferscheidt-Dyck ====
- Joseph (1806–1861) in pretence
- Alfred (1861–1888), title to branch of Salm-Reifferscheid-Krautheim

==== Post-mediatized princes of Salm-Reifferscheidt-Krautheim ====
- Francis William, 1806–1831
- Constantin (1831–1856), title in pretence
- Francis Charles (1856–1860)
- Leopold (1860–1893)
- Alfred (1893–1924)

==== Post-mediatized princes of Salm-Reifferscheidt-Hainsbach ====
- Francis Wenceslaus (1811–1832), title in pretence
- Francis Vincent (1832–1842)
- John (1842–1847)
- Francis Joseph (1847–1887)
- Alois (1887–1897)

==== Post-mediatized princes of Salm-Reifferscheidt-Raitz ====
- Hugh I Francis (1811–1836), title in pretence
- Hugh II Charles (1836–1888)
- Hugh III (1888–1890)
- Hugh IV (1890–1903)
- Hugh V Leopold (1903–1946)
- Hugh VI
- Hugh VII (born 1973)
