= Charles, Wild- and Rhinegrave of Salm-Dhaun =

Wild- and Rhinegrave of Salm-Dhaun

- Born: 21 September 1675; Hochstetten-Dhaun
- Died: 26 March 1733 (aged 57); Hochstetten-Dhaun
- Noble family: House of Salm
- Spouse: Louise of Nassau-Ottweiler
- Father: John Philip II, Wild- and Rhinegrave of Salm-Dhaun
- Mother: Anna Catherine of Nassau-Ottweiler

Wild- and Rhinegrave Charles of Salm-Dhaun (21 September 1675 – 26 March 1733) was Wild- and Rhinegrave of Salm-Dhaun from 1693 to 1733. He was born in Hochstetten-Dhaun, the son of Wild- and Rhinegrave John Philip II of Salm-Dhaun and his wife, Anna Catherine of Nassau-Ottweiler.

He married on 19 January 1704 in Ottweiler to his first cousin Louise, the daughter of Count Frederick Louis of Nassau-Ottweiler. Charles and Louise had ten children:

- Catherine Louise (born 1705)
- Caroline (born 1706)
- Christina (born 1710)
- Wilhelmina (born 1712)
- Albertine (born 1716)
- Charles Augustus (born 1718)
- Sophie Charlotte (born 1719)
- Louise (born 1721)
- John Philip III (born 1724)
- Jeanette Louise (born 1725)

Charles died in Hochstetten-Dhaun, aged 57.

Charles, Wild- and Rhinegrave of Salm-Dhaun House of Salm Born: 21 September 1675 Died: 26 March 1733
Preceded by John Philip II	Wild- and Rhinegrave of Salm-Dhaun; 1693-1733	Succeeded by John Philip III
