= John Philip II, Wild- and Rhinegrave of Salm-Dhaun =

John Philip II, Count of Salm-Dhaun
- Born: 28 October 1645; Hochstetten-Dhaun
- Died: 26 June 1693 (aged 47); Hochstetten-Dhaun
- Noble family: Salm-Dhaun
- Spouse: Anna Catherine of Nassau-Ottweiler
- Father: John Louis of Salm-Dhaun
- Mother: Elisabeth of Salm-Neufville

John Philip II of Salm-Dhaun (28 October 1645 – 26 June 1693) was Rhinegrave of Salm-Dhaun from 1673 until his death. He was the son of Count John Louis of Salm-Dhaun and his wife, Elisabeth of Salm-Neufville.

== Personal life ==
He married Anna Catherine, the daughter of John Louis, Count of Nassau-Ottweiler and Countess Palatine Dorothea Catherine of Birkenfeld-Bischweiler. They had seven children:

- Louis Philip (b. 1672)
- Sophia Dorothea (b. 1674)
- Charles (b. 1675)
- Philip Magnus (b. 1679)
- Christian Otto (b. 1680)
- Walrad (b. 1686)
- Ludovica Catharina (b. 1687)

John Philip II was born and died in Hochstetten-Dhaun.

John Philip II, Wild- and Rhinegrave of Salm-Dhaun House of Salm Born: 28 October 1645 Died: 26 June 1693
Preceded by John Louis	Wild- and Rhinegrave of Salm-Dhaun; 1673-1693	Succeeded by Charles
