= Magdalena Katharina of Zweibrücken =

Magdalena Catherine of Zweibrücken
- Coat-of-arms of Wittelsbach-Palatinate
- Born: 26 April 1607; Zweibrücken
- Died: 20 January 1648 (aged 40); Strasbourg
- Burial: Reformed Church in Bischweiler
- Spouse: Christian I, Count Palatine of Birkenfeld-Bischweiler (m. 1630)
- Issue: Dorothea Catherine, Countess of Nassau-Ottweiler; Countess Palatine Louise Sophie; Christian II, Count Palatine of Zweibrücken-Birkenfeld; John Charles, Count Palatine of Gelnhausen; Anna Magdalena, Countess of Hanau-Lichtenberg
- House: Wittelsbach
- Father: John II, Count Palatine of Zweibrücken
- Mother: Catherine de Rohan

Magdalena Catherine, Countess Palatine of Zweibrücken (German: Magdalena Katharina von Pfalz-Zweibrücken; 26 April 1607, Zweibrücken – 20 January 1648, Strasbourg) was a Countess Palatine of Zweibrücken by birth and by marriage Duchess and Countess Palatine of Birkenfeld.

== Life ==
Magdalena Catherine was the only child of the Duke and Count Palatine John II of Zweibrücken-Veldenz (1584–1635) from his first marriage to Catherine de Rohan (1578–1607), daughter of René II, de Rohan. From the second marriage of his father, she had seven half-siblings, of whom the oldest half-brother, Frederick inherited their father's position as Count Palatine and Duke of Zweibrücken.

She married on 14 November 1630 in Zweibrücken Count Palatine and Duke Christian I of Birkenfeld (1598–1654). Magdalena Catherine brought as a dowry to her husband the district of Bischweiler in Alsace into the marriage. The couple initially lived in a wing of Birkenfeld Castle. Later Christian built a castle of his own, which they used as a family residence. Bischweiler was completely destroyed in 1635 in the throes of the Thirty Years' War.

Magdalena Catherine died in exile in Strasbourg on 20 January 1648. She was buried in the Reformed Church of Bischweiler.

== Issue ==
From her marriage, Katharina Magdalena had the following children:

- Unnamed Son (* / † 1631)
- Gustav Adolph (* / † 1632)
- John Christian * (* / † 1633)
- Dorothea Catherine (1634–1715)

married in 1649 Count John Louis of Nassau-Ottweiler (1625–1690)

- Louise Sophie (1635–1691)
- Christian II (1637–1717), Duke and Count Palatine of Birkenfeld

married in 1667 Countess Catherine Agathe of Rappoltstein (1648–1683)

- John Charles (1638–1704), Count Palatine and Duke of Gelnhausen

married firstly, in 1685 Princess and Countess Palatine Sophie Amalie of Zweibrücken (1646–1695)
married secondly, in 1696 Esther Marie of Witzleben (1665–1725)

- Anna Magdalena (1640–1693)

married in 1659 Count Johann Reinhard II of Hanau-Lichtenberg (1628–1666)

== Ancestry ==
Ancestors of Magdalena Katharina of Zweibrücken

8. Wolfgang, Count Palatine of Zweibrücken
4. John I, Count Palatine of Zweibrücken
9. Anna of Hesse
2. John II, Count Palatine of Zweibrücken
10. William, Duke of Jülich-Cleves-Berg
5. Magdalene of Jülich-Cleves-Berg
11. Archduchess Maria of Austria
1. Magdalena Katharina of Zweibrücken
12. René I, Viscount of Rohan
6. René II, Viscount of Rohan
13. Isabella of Navarre
3. Catherine de Rohan
14. Jean V of Parthenay
7. Catherine de Parthenay
15. Antoinette d'Aubeterre
