= Christian II, Count Palatine of Zweibrücken-Birkenfeld =

Count Palatine of Zweibrucken-Birkenfeld (1671-1699)

Christian II
- Count Palatine of Zweibrücken-Birkenfeld
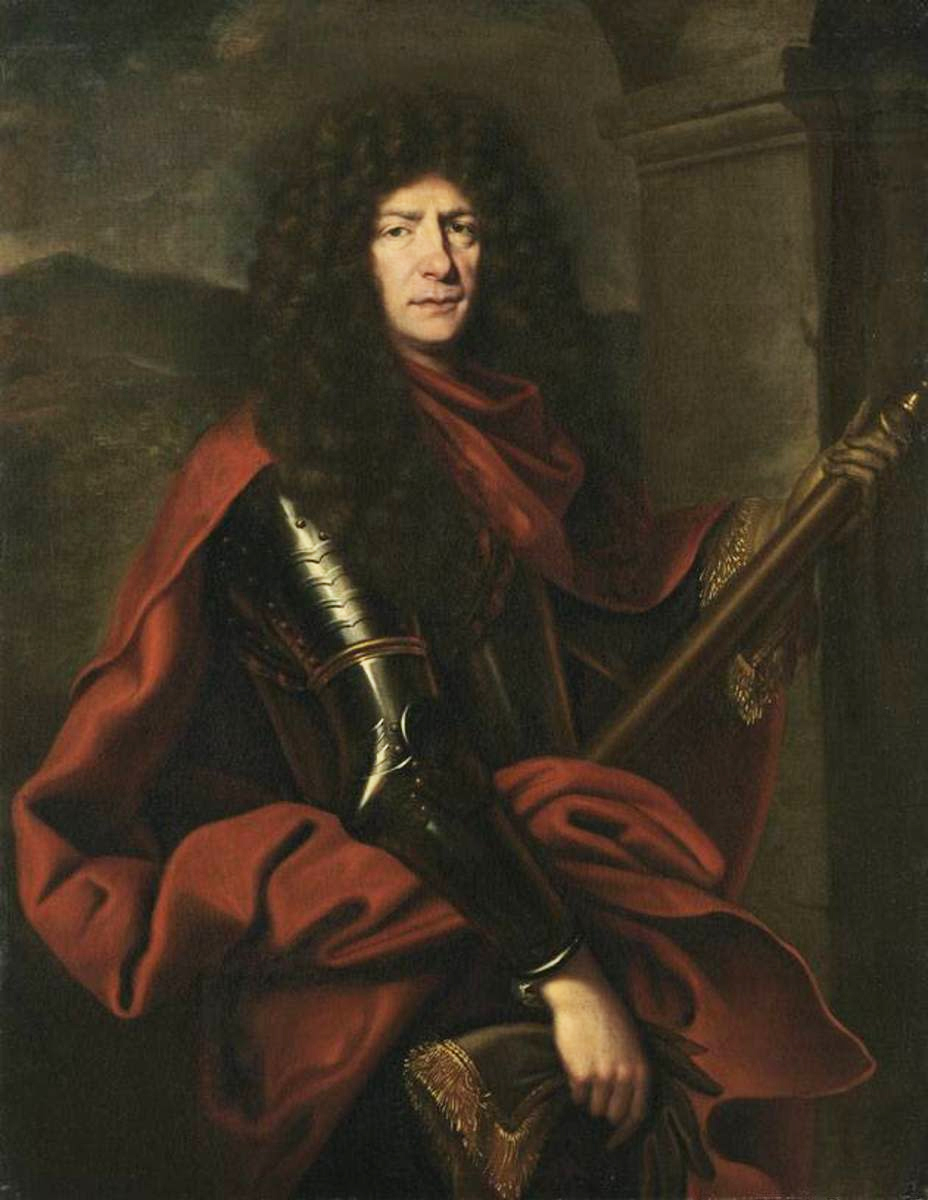
- Portrait by Theodor Roos
- Born: 22 June 1637; Bischwiller
- Died: 26 April 1717 (aged 79); Birkenfeld
- Spouse: Countess Katharina Agathe of Rappoltstein (m. 1667; died 1683)
- Issue: Magdalena Claudia, Countess of Hanau-Münzenberg; Christian III, Count Palatine of Zweibrücken; Louise, Princess of Waldeck and Pyrmont
- House: Wittelsbach
- Father: Christian I, Count Palatine of Birkenfeld-Bischweiler
- Mother: Countess Palatine Magdalene Catherine of Zweibrücken

Christian II (22 June 1637 – 26 April 1717) was the Duke of Birkenfeld-Bischweiler from 1654, the Duke of Zweibrücken-Birkenfeld from 1671, and the Count of Rappoltstein from 1673 until 1699.

== Early life and ancestry ==
Christian was born in Bischwiller in 1637, as the eldest surviving son of Christian I, Count Palatine of Birkenfeld-Bischweiler by his first wife, Countess Palatine Magdalene Catherine of Zweibrücken, both members of the House of Wittelsbach.

== Reign ==
After his father's death in 1654 he succeeded him to his territories around Bischweiler. In 1671 he inherited Palatinate-Zweibrücken-Birkenfeld from his cousin Charles II Otto. Through the inheritance of his wife, he was also the Count of Rappolstein from 1673 until he granted that title to his son Christian III.

== Marriage and issue ==
Christian II married Countess Catherine Agatha of Rappoltstein (15 June 1648 – 16 July 1683) on 5 September 1667.

Together, they had seven children:

1. Magdalena Claudia (16 September 1668 – 9 December 1704), married to Philipp Reinhard, Count of Hanau-Münzenberg
2. Louis (26 December 1669 – 2 April 1670)
3. Elizabeth Sophie Augusta (2 August 1671 – 18 October 1672)
4. Christina Catherine (2 August 1671 – 15 May 1673)
5. Charlotte Wilhelmina (18 October 1672 – 29 May 1673)
6. Christian (7 November 1674 – 3 February 1735)
7. Louise (28 October 1678 – 3 May 1753), married to Friedrich Anton Ulrich, Prince of Waldeck and Pyrmont

== Death ==
Christian II died on 26 April 1717, in Birkenfeld, aged 79. He was interred in the family vault in Birkenfeld, until 1776, when his body was, along with that of his wife, transferred and buried in the Schlosskirche Meisenheim, Bad Kreuznach.

== Ancestry ==
Ancestors of Christian II, Count Palatine of Zweibrücken-Birkenfeld

8. Wolfgang, Count Palatine of Zweibrücken (=24)
4. Charles I, Count Palatine of Zweibrücken-Birkenfeld
9. Anna of Hesse (=25)
2. Christian I, Count Palatine of Birkenfeld-Bischweiler
10. William, Duke of Brunswick-Lüneburg
5. Duchess Dorothea of Brunswick-Lüneburg
11. Dorothea of Denmark
1. Christian II, Count Palatine of Zweibrücken-Birkenfeld
12. John I, Count Palatine of Zweibrücken
6. John II, Count Palatine of Zweibrücken
13. Magdalene of Jülich-Cleves-Berg
3. Countess Palatine Magdalene Catherine of Zweibrücken
14. René II, Viscount of Rohan
7. Catherine de Rohan
15. Catherine de Parthenay

== Bibliography ==
- Maximilian V. Sattler: Lehrbuch der bayerischen Geschichte, Lindauer, 1868, p. 411
- Jahresbericht [nachmals] Trierer Jahresberichte, 1858, p. 58 f.

Regnal titles
Preceded by Christian I	Duke of Birkenfeld-Bischweiler; 1654 – 1717	Succeeded by Christian III
Preceded by Charles II Otto	Duke of Zweibrücken-Birkenfeld; 1671 – 1717	Succeeded by Christian III
Preceded by Catherine Agatha	Count of Rappolstein; 1673 – 1699; With: Catherine Agatha (1673 – 1683)	Succeeded by Christian III
