= John Louis, Count of Nassau-Ottweiler =

- Born: 23 May 1625; Saarbrücken
- Died: 9 February 1690 (aged 64); Reichelsheim
- Noble family: House of Nassau
- Spouse: Countess Palatine Dorothea Catherine of Birkenfeld-Bischweiler
- Father: William Louis, Count of Nassau-Saarbrücken
- Mother: Anna Amalia of Baden-Durlach

John Louis, Count of Nassau-Ottweiler (23 May 1625, Saarbrücken – 9 February 1690, Reichelsheim), was first Count of Nassau-Ottweiler. At times, he was Major General, Regent of the other Nassau territories and chief of the House of Nassau.

== Life ==
He was the second son of William Louis of Nassau-Saarbrücken and his wife Anna Amalia of Baden-Durlach. At the age of ten years he had to flee to Metz with his parents. His father died in 1640. John Louis and his mother were able to return to Saarbrücken three years later. Before his return, he had studied at the Academy of Saumur. Between 1644 and 1645 he completed his Grand Tour to Paris. The Peace of Westphalia restored all the Nassau territories in 1648.

John Louis took up the government of Nassau-Saarbrücken and Nassau-Usingen. After the death of his mother in 1651 he also became guardian of his younger brothers. In 1653, he founded the Ironworks in Neunkirchen. In 1659 John Louis and his brothers split their father's inheritance. John Louis received the area around Ottweiler. This made him the founder of the Nassau-Ottweiler branch, which existed until 1728.

He entered French military service in 1656 and was Colonel of the Royal-Alsace Regiment. He was taken prisoner during the Franco-Spanish War.

Even when he was still a minor, John Louis sought the return of Homburg, which had been taken by Lorraine. He was assisted by Louis XIV and it came to negotiations before the Reichstag. John Louis was granted sovereign rights over the Homburg district, but the fortress remained in the hands of Lorraine until the Empire had paid its war debts to Lorraine. When another war broke out between France and Lorraine, John Louis surrendered Homburg to the Electorate of Trier.

During the Franco-Dutch War, John Louis's territories were devastated. Later, the Nassau territories were threatened by Louis XIV's Reunion Policy. John Louis refused to pay homage to the French king as count of Homburg and Ottweiler. Instead, he resigned from the government and in 1680 handed over the reign to his son Frederick Louis. John Louis then went to the Nassau territories East of the Rhine.

When in 1675, Frederick of Nassau-Weilburg died, John Louis took up guardianship of his children and the regency of Nassau-Weilburg. When in 1677 Gustav Adolph died, John Louis became the senior member of the House of Nassau.

John Louis was in the service of the Upper Rhenish Circle and founded a new imperial army. He was appointed General Sergeant and in 1682, he was promoted to General Major. He led his own infantry regiment against the French into the War of the Palatine Succession.

He died in 1690 and was buried in the Protestant Church of Ottweiler. His remains were destroyed in the looting of the church during the French Revolution.

== Family ==
In 1649, he married Dorothea Catherine (1634-1715) a daughter of the Count Palatine Christian I of Birkenfeld-Bischweiler. This had the following children:

- Christian Louis (1650-1650)
- Frederick Louis (1651-1728)

married firstly on 28 July 1680 Countess Christiane of Ahlefeld (1659-1695)
married secondly on 27 September 1697 Countess Louise Sophie of Hanau-Lichtenberg (1662-1751)

- Anna Catherine (1653-1731)

married in 1671 to John Philip II, Wild- and Rhinegrave of Salm-Dhaun (1645-1693)

- Wolrad (1656-1705)
- Charles Siegfried (1659-1679)
- Louis (1661-1699)

married on 9 April 1694 Countess Louise Amalie of Horne (1665-1728)

- Louise (1662-1741)
- Maurice (1664-1666)

John Louis, Count of Nassau-Ottweiler House of Nassau Born: 23 May 1625 Died: 9 February 1690
Preceded by Anna Amalia as Regent	Count of Nassau-Saarbrücken regent of all the territories of the Walram line 1651-1659	Inheritance divided
New division	Count of Nassau-Ottweiler; 1659-1690	Succeeded by Frederick Louis
