= Countess Palatine Magdalena Claudia of Zweibrücken-Birkenfeld-Bischweiler =

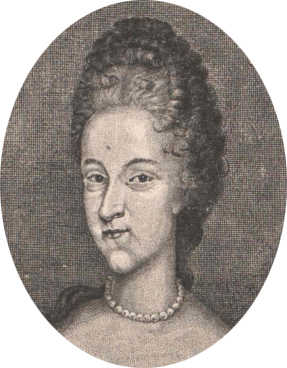
- Engraving portrait of Countess Palatine Magdalena Claudia of Zweibrücken-Birkenfeld-Bischweiler
- Born: 16 September 1668
- Died: 28 November 1704 (aged 36); Hanau
- Noble family: Wittelsbach
- Spouse: Philip Reinhard, Count of Hanau-Münzenberg
- Father: Christian II, Count Palatine of Zweibrücken-Birkenfeld
- Mother: Catherine Agathe, Countess of Rappoltstein

Countess Palatine Claudia Magdalena of Zweibrücken-Birkenfeld-Bischweiler (also known as Magdalena Claudine; 16 September 1668 – 28 November 1704 in Hanau), the Countess consort of Hanau-Münzenberg.

== Early life and ancestry ==
Magdalena Claudia was the eldest daughter of the Count Palatine Christian II of Palatinate-Birkenfeld-Bischweiler (born: 22 June 1637; died: 26 April 1717) and his wife, Countess Catherine Agathe of Rappoltstein (1648-1683).

== Marriage ==
She married on 27 February [O.S. 17 February] 1689 in Hanau her cousin, Count Philip Reinhard of Hanau-Münzenberg (1664–1712). The dowry was 18000guilders.

== Issue ==
From her marriage with Philip Reinhard, she had the following children:

1. Stillbirth (1691), buried in the crypt of the St. John's Church (now called Old St. John's Church) in Hanau
2. Stillbirth (1693);
3. Catharine Magdalene (born: 16 June [O.S. 6 June] 1695; died: 19 December [O.S. 9 December] 1695), buried in the crypt of St John's Church in Hanau

== Death ==
She died on 28 November 1704 and was buried in the crypt of the Lutheran Church in Hanau, on 18 December 1704, aged 37. During the mourning, the biggest bell in St. John's Church broke. This was a bell she had donated. The burial site of the Lutheran branch of the House of Hanau - and thus the burial of Countess Claudia Magdalena - was destroyed during the Second World War.
