= John Philip III, Wild- and Rhinegrave of Salm-Dhaun =

- Born: 20 January 1724
- Died: 13 September 1742 (aged 18)
- Noble family: House of Salm
- Father: Charles, Wild- and Rhinegrave of Salm-Dhaun
- Mother: Louise of Nassau-Ottweiler

John Philip III, Wild- and Rhinegrave of Salm-Dhaun (20 January 1724 – 13 September 1742) was a German nobleman. He was the ruling Wild- and Rhinegrave of Salm-Dhaun from 1733 until his death. He was the son of Wild- and Rhinegrave Charles and his wife Louise, a daughter of Frederick Louis, Count of Nassau-Ottweiler.

John Philip III never married and was only 18 years old when he died. He was succeeded by his uncle Christian Otto, because his father he no more living male-line descendants.

John Philip III, Wild- and Rhinegrave of Salm-Dhaun House of Salm Born: 20 January 1724 Died: 13 September 1742
Preceded by Charles	Wild- and Rhinegrave of Salm-Dhaun; 1733-1742	Succeeded by Christian Otto
