= Countess Anna Catherine of Nassau-Ottweiler =

Anna Catherine of Nassau-Ottweiler
- Born: 31 January 1653; Ottweiler
- Died: 15 February 1731 (aged 78); Ottweiler
- Noble family: House of Nassau
- Spouse: John Philip II, Wild- and Rhinegrave of Salm-Dhaun
- Father: John Louis, Count of Nassau-Ottweiler
- Mother: Countess Palatine Dorothea Catherine of Birkenfeld-Bischweiler

Anna Catherine of Nassau-Ottweiler (31 January 1653 – 15 February 1731) was a daughter of John Louis, Count of Nassau-Ottweiler and his wife, Countess Palatine Dorothea Catherine of Birkenfeld-Bischweiler. She was styled "Countess of Nassau-Ottweiler".

She was born in Ottweiler, and married on 11 November 1671, at the age of 18, John Philip II, Wild- and Rhinegrave of Salm-Dhaun. They had seven children:

- Louis Philip (born 1672)
- Sophia Dorothea (born 1674)
- Charles (born 1675)
- Philip Magnus (born 1679)
- Christian Otto (born 1680)
- Walrad (born 1686)
- Ludovica Catherine (born 1687)

She died in her native city of Ottweiler.
