= Ottweiler porcelain =

Type of hard-paste porcelain

Ottweiler porcelain is a type of hard-paste porcelain which used to be made in Ottweiler, Germany. Today, only few pieces have survived.

== History ==
Étienne-Dominique Pellevé, of Rouen, France, started producing this porcelain in Ottweiler in 1763. The factory was under patronage of Wilhelm Heinrich of Nassau-Saarbrücken (1735-1768), and part of his garden.

== Remaining porcelain ==
The largest collection of remaining Ottweiler porcelain can today be seen at the Witwenpalais in Ottweiler.
