= Château de Blâmont =

13th-century castle in Grand Est, France

Coordinates: 48°35′29″N 6°50′43″E

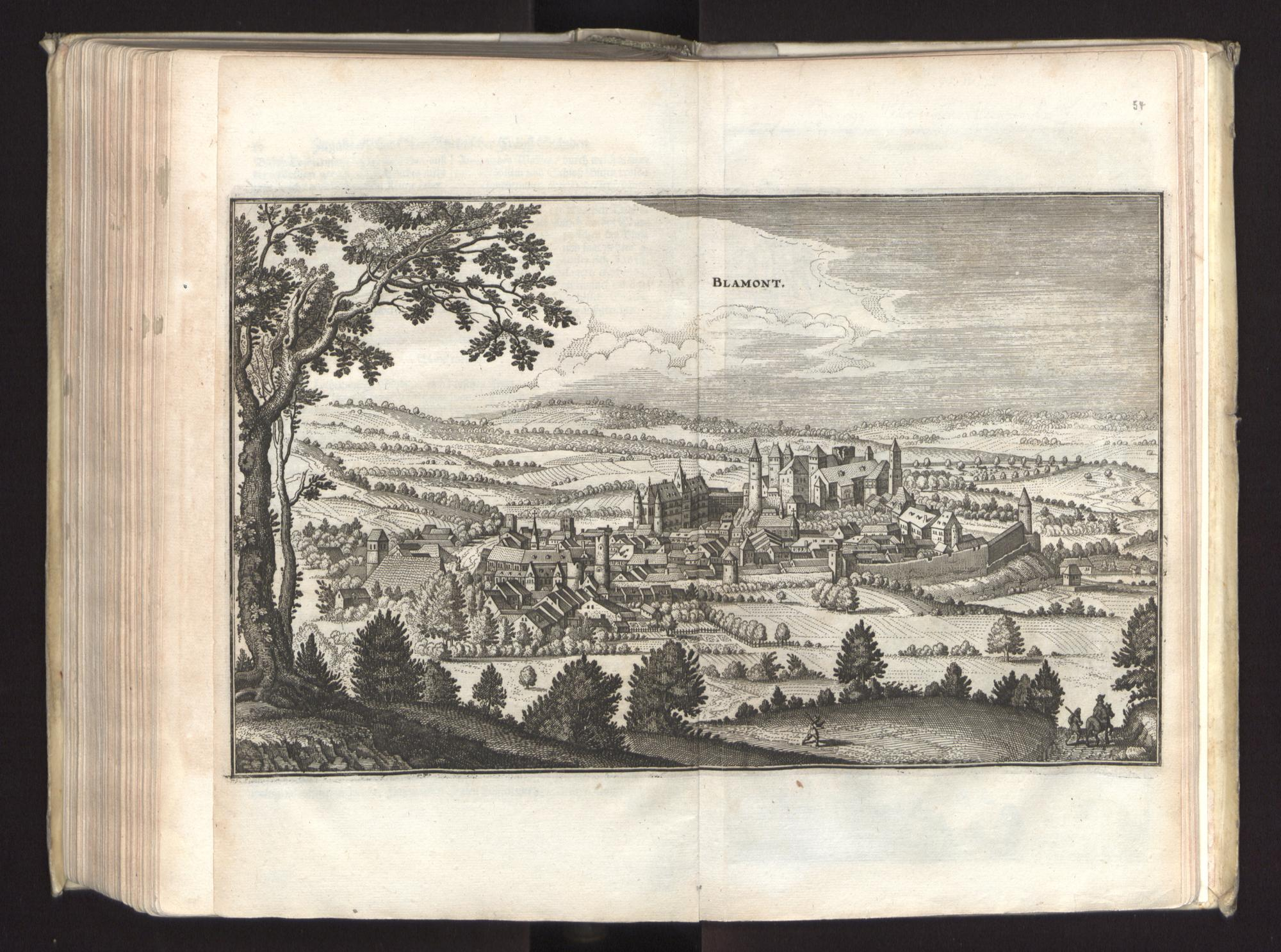
Château de Blâmont, before its destruction by American bombers

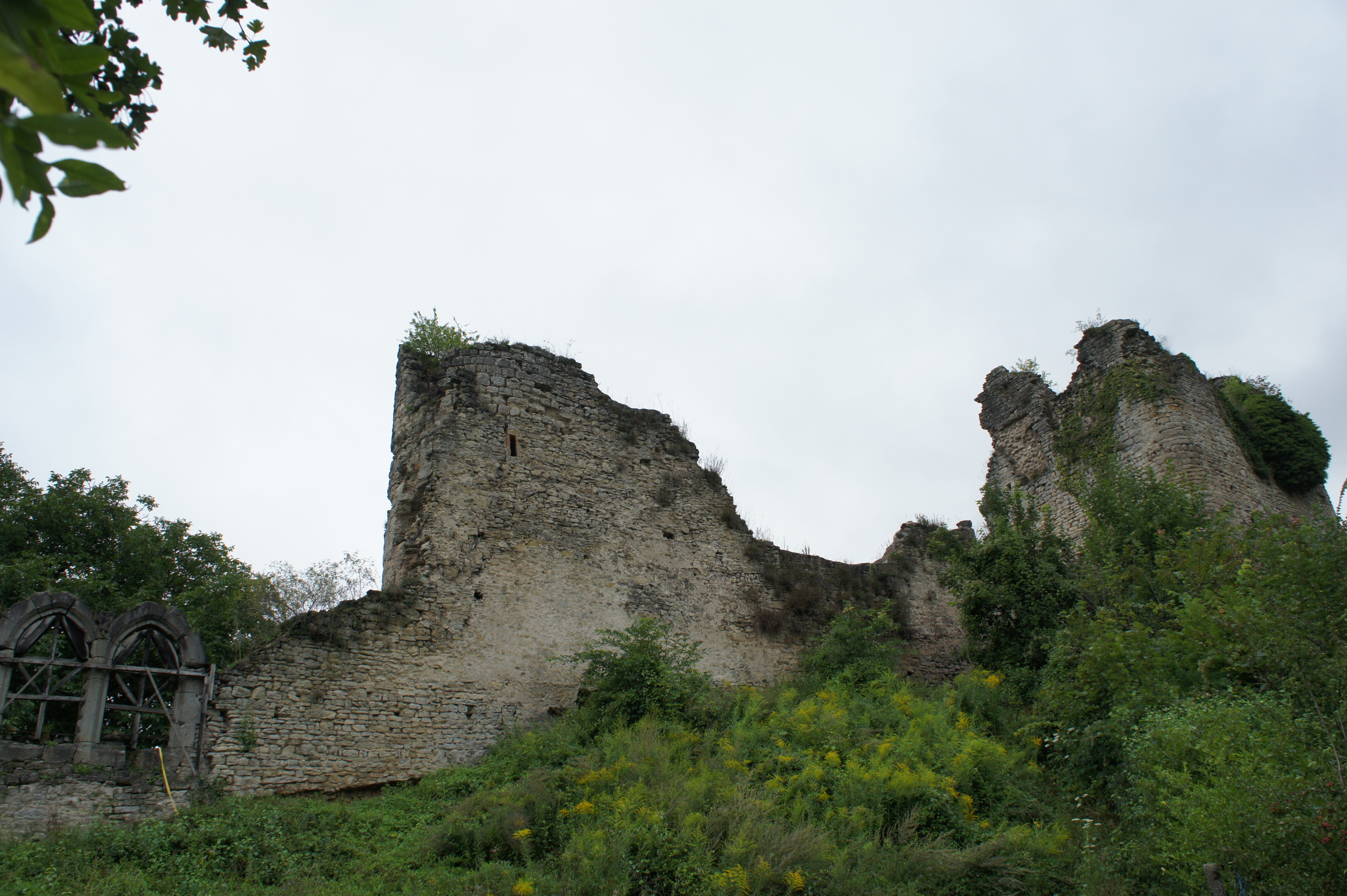
Ruins of the castle in 2014

The Château de Blâmont is a castle built at the end of the 13th century in the French commune of Blâmont, in the département of Meurthe-et-Moselle.

It underwent successive alterations and extensions in the 13th, 14th and 17th centuries which have made it one of the most beautiful medieval castle ruins in Lorraine, thanks to the preservation of five towers.

Despite heavy damage by American bombardment in 1944, the building has survived. Built around 1200, the castle was given new fortifications a century later. In the 16th century, a Renaissance-style building was constructed within the walls. The fortress suffered during the Thirty Years' War. During the 19th century, the medieval part was converted into a romantic castle, and part of the site became a weaving mill. In 1912, the castle became the property of a chocolatier, Fernand Burrus, who added two towers. Today, members of the Association Clef de Voûte maintain the site and organise events.

Château de Blâmont has been listed as a monument historique by the French Ministry of Culture since 1994.

== See also ==
- List of castles in France
