= Christian Otto, Wild- and Rhinegrave of Salm-Dhaun =

- Born: 14 April 1680
- Died: 24 April 1748 (aged 68)
- Noble family: House of Salm
- Father: John Philip II
- Mother: Anna Catherine of Nassau-Ottweiler

Christian Otto, Wild- and Rhinegrave of Salm-Dhaun (14 April 1680 – 24 April 1748) was Wild- and Rhinegrave of Salm-Dhaun from 1742 until his death. He was the son of John Philip II and his wife Anna Catherine of Nassau-Ottweiler.

He was the uncle of his predecessor, John Philip III, who died at age 18. Christian Otto himself also died unmarried and childless. He was succeeded by John Frederick, the son of his younger brother Walrad.

Christian Otto, Wild- and Rhinegrave of Salm-Dhaun House of Salm Born: 14 April 1680 Died: 24 April 1748
Preceded by John Philip III	Wild- and Rhinegrave of Salm-Dhaun; 1742-1748	Succeeded by John Frederick
