= Blâmont =

- Commune
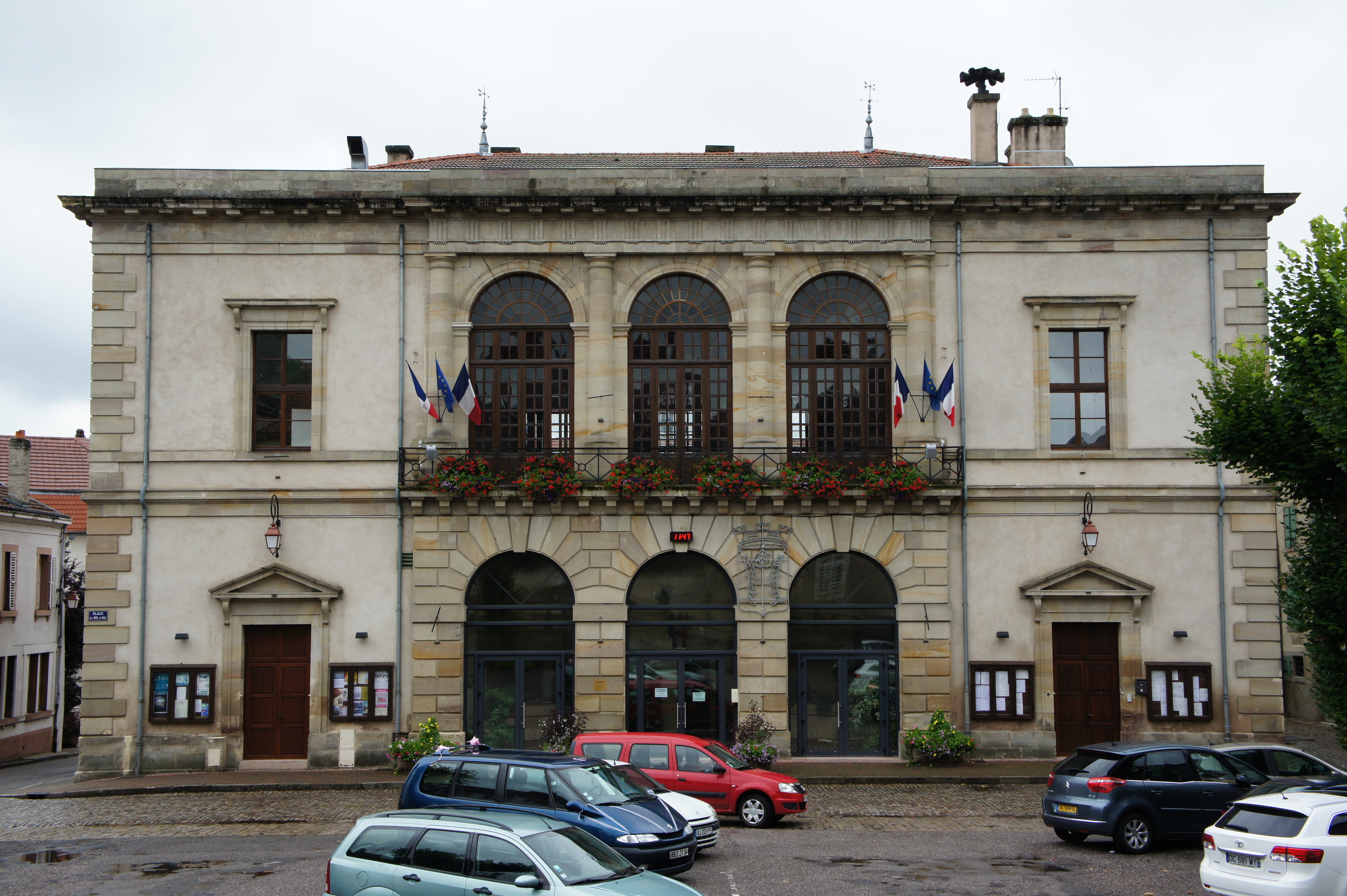
- The town hall in Blâmont

- Coat of arms
- Location of Blâmont
- Location within France Location within Grand Est
- Coordinates: 48°35′26″N 6°50′35″E
- Country: France
- Region: Grand Est
- Department: Meurthe-et-Moselle
- Arrondissement: Lunéville
- Canton: Baccarat

Government
  - Mayor (2020–2026): Thierry Meurant
- Area^{1}: 7.41 km^{2} (2.86 sq mi)
- Elevation: 264 m (866 ft)
- Highest elevation: 336 m (1,102 ft)
- Lowest elevation: 254 m (833 ft)
- Population (2023): 1,042
  - Density: 141/km^{2} (364/sq mi)
- Time zone: UTC+01:00 (CET)
  - Summer (DST): UTC+02:00 (CEST)
- INSEE/Postal code: 54077 /54450
- ^{1} French Land Register data, which excludes lakes, ponds, glaciers > 1 km^{2} (0.386 sq mi or 247 acres) and river estuaries.

Blâmont (French pronunciation: [blamɔ̃]) is a commune in the Meurthe-et-Moselle department in northeastern France.

== Population ==
Historical population
Year	Pop.	±% p.a.
1968	1,400	—
1975	1,257	−1.53%
1982	1,399	+1.54%
1990	1,318	−0.74%
1999	1,261	−0.49%
2007	1,180	−0.83%
2012	1,099	−1.41%
2017	1,072	−0.50%
2023	1,042	−0.47%
Source: INSEE

== Sights ==
The Château de Blâmont is the medieval castle below which the city grew.

== See also ==
- Communes of the Meurthe-et-Moselle department
- Florent Schmitt (1870-1958), French composer born in Blâmont
