= Neuburg am Inn =

Neuburg a. Inn
- Municipality
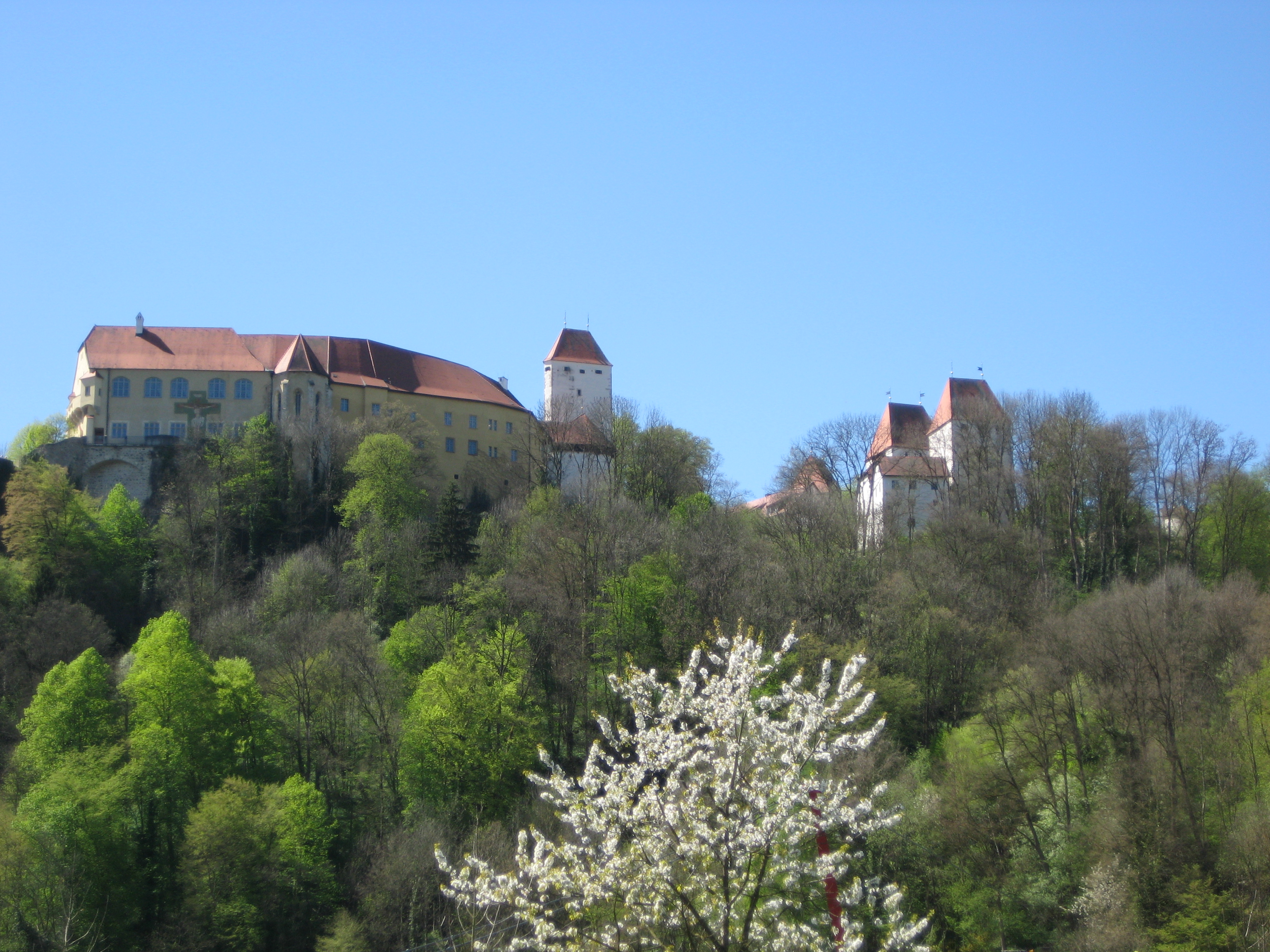
- Neuburg am Inn Castle

- Coat of arms

- Location of Neuburg a. Inn within Passau district
- Interactive map of Neuburg a. Inn
- Location within Germany Location within Bavaria
- Coordinates: 48°30′N 13°27′E
- Country: Germany
- State: Bavaria
- Admin. region: Niederbayern
- District: Passau

Government
  - Mayor (2020–26): Wolfgang Lindmeier (CSU)

Area
  - Total: 41.84 km^{2} (16.15 sq mi)
- Elevation: 452 m (1,483 ft)

Population (2025-12-31)
  - Total: 4,473
  - Density: 106.9/km^{2} (276.9/sq mi)
- Time zone: UTC+01:00 (CET)
  - Summer (DST): UTC+02:00 (CEST)
- Postal codes: 94127
- Dialling codes: 08502/08507
- Vehicle registration: PA
- Website: www.neuburg-am-inn.de

Neuburg am Inn is a municipality in the district of Passau in Bavaria in Germany.

Neuburg lies high above the river Inn, which forms the natural border with Austria. In 2006, a bridge was opened over the Inn for pedestrians and cyclists, connecting Neuburg with the opposite bank in Austria.

The municipality is divided into two parts. The eastern part lies directly on the Inn and consists of the two villages of Neuburg (with the castle) and Dommelstadl (with the church), which have grown together. The western part consists of Neukirchen am Inn (approx. 7 km away from Neuburg), with the villages of Pfenningbach and Kurzeichet as well as a few scattered hamlets such as Dobl, Fürstdobl, Grünet and Niederreisching. Neukirchen is also home to the municipality's train station. Neuburg am Inn is located directly on the Autobahn A3. The nearest major city is Passau, 12 km away.

== Neighboring Communities ==
- Fürstenzell
- Ruhstorf an der Rott
- Neuhaus am Inn

== History ==
It is assumed that the castle was built around the year 1050. The Neuburg am Inn formerly belonged to the Habsburg count of Neuburg. In the 13th century the Duke of Bavaria attempted to claim the fortress, but it was successfully defended in the name of the Count of Neuburg. Austria later purchased the sovereignty here through the Bishopric of Passau, acquired it in 1730/39. Since 1803, it has belonged to Bavaria.

== People, politics and culture ==
=== Population development ===
- 1970: 3.008 inhabitants
- 1987: 3.257 inhabitants
- 2000: 3.846 inhabitants
- 2010: 4,216 inhabitants

=== Council ===
The council has been working the local elections on 2 March 2008 as follows:

- CSU: 10 seats (58,5% der Stimmen)
- Freie Wähler/Bürgerliste: 3 seats (17,5% der Stimmen)
- Green: 2 seats (12,7% der Stimmen)
- SPD: 1 seat (11,2% der Stimmen)

=== Mayor ===
The most recent mayors were:

- 2002–2014: Joseph Stöcker (CSU)
- since 2014: Wolfgang Lindmeier (CSU)

=== Community partnerships ===
Neuburg am Inn has partnered with the Upper Austrian town Wernstein.

=== Arts and culture ===
- Neuburg Castle
- Trinity Church in nearby Dommelstadl

=== Notable people ===
- Ignaz Auer (1846–1907), born in Dommelstadl, politician (SPD), member of the Reichstag
- Erhard Auer (1874–1945), born in Dommelstadl, Bavarian politician (SPD), member of the Landtag of Bavaria, First Minister of the Free State of Bavaria, SPD party leader in Bavaria

== Economy and Infrastructure ==
=== Economy, agriculture and forestry ===
In 2017, there were 1,166 jobs subject to social insurance contributions in the municipality. Of the resident population, 1,713 people were in employment subject to social insurance contributions. This means that the number of out-commuters was 547 higher than the number of in-commuters. 54 residents were unemployed. There were 45 agricultural businesses in 2016.

=== Education ===
The following facilities exist as of 1999: Kindergartens: 150 kindergartens with 140 children Primary schools: 1 with 11 teachers and 210 students

=== Telecommunications ===
90 metre high telecommunications tower of Deutsche Telekom AG of reinforced concrete at Dommelstadl (Geographical coordinates: 48 ° 32'3 "N 13 ° 24'9" W), broadcasting over 102.1 Mhz.
