= Neuviller-sur-Moselle =

- Commune
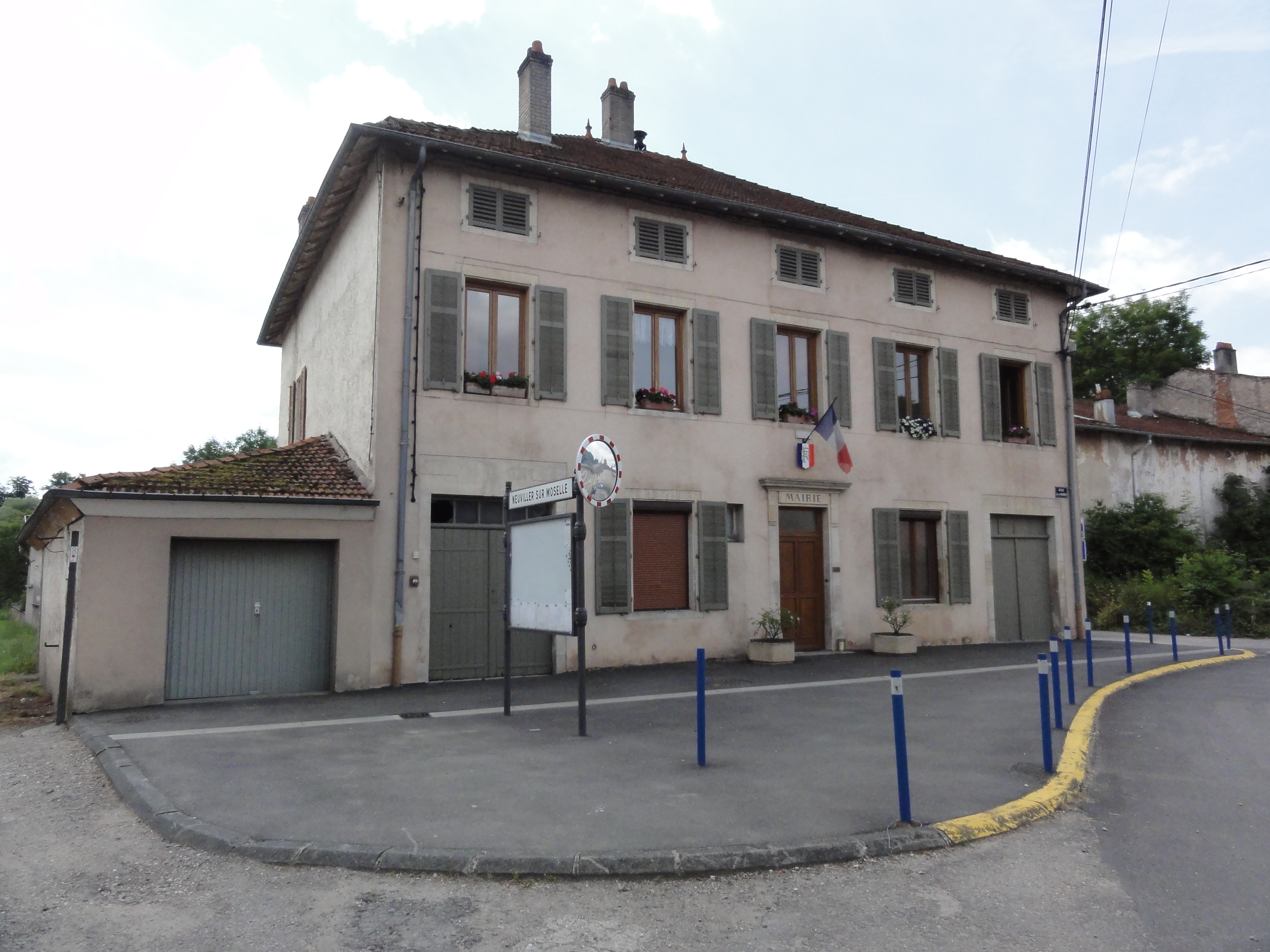
- The town hall in Neuviller-sur-Moselle

- Coat of arms
- Location of Neuviller-sur-Moselle
- Location within France Location within Grand Est
- Coordinates: 48°29′36″N 6°17′17″E
- Country: France
- Region: Grand Est
- Department: Meurthe-et-Moselle
- Arrondissement: Nancy
- Canton: Meine au Saintois
- Intercommunality: Pays du Saintois

Government
  - Mayor (2020–2026): Bénédicte Brusseaux
- Area^{1}: 6.71 km^{2} (2.59 sq mi)
- Elevation: 245 m (804 ft)
- Highest elevation: 360 m (1,180 ft)
- Lowest elevation: 239 m (784 ft)
- Population (2023): 250
  - Density: 37/km^{2} (96/sq mi)
- Time zone: UTC+01:00 (CET)
  - Summer (DST): UTC+02:00 (CEST)
- INSEE/Postal code: 54399 /54290
- ^{1} French Land Register data, which excludes lakes, ponds, glaciers > 1 km^{2} (0.386 sq mi or 247 acres) and river estuaries.

Neuviller-sur-Moselle (French pronunciation: [nøvile syʁ mɔzɛl], literally Neuviller on Moselle) is a commune in the Meurthe-et-Moselle department in north-eastern France.

== See also ==
- Communes of the Meurthe-et-Moselle department
