= Christian I, Count Palatine of Birkenfeld-Bischweiler =

Duke of Birkenfeld-Bischweiler from 1600 until 1654

Christian I
- Count Palatine of Birkenfeld-Bischweiler
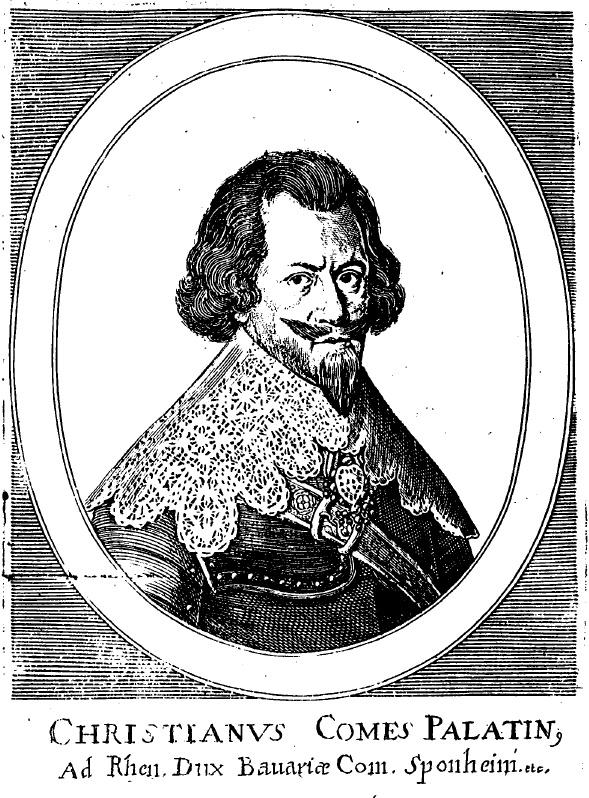
- Engraving c. 1650
- Born: 3 November 1598; Birkenfeld
- Died: 6 September 1654 (aged 55); Neuenstein
- Burial: Bischwiller
- Spouse: Magdalene Catherine, Countess Palatine of Zweibrücken (m. 1630; died 1648) Maria Joanna of Helffenstein (m. 1648)
- Issue Detail: Dorothea Catherine, Countess of Nassau-Ottweiler; Countess Palatine Louise Sophie; Christian II, Count Palatine of Zweibrücken-Birkenfeld; John Charles, Count Palatine of Gelnhausen; Anna Magdalena, Countess of Hanau-Lichtenberg
- House: Wittelsbach
- Father: Charles I, Count Palatine of Zweibrücken-Birkenfeld
- Mother: Dorothea of Brunswick-Lüneburg

Christian I (3 November 1598 – 6 September 1654) was the Duke of Birkenfeld-Bischweiler from 1600 until 1654. He was an ancestor of the Kings of Bavaria.

== Life ==
Christian was born in Birkenfeld in 1598, member of the House of Wittelsbach, as the youngest son of Charles I, Count Palatine of Zweibrücken-Birkenfeld by his wife, Duchess Dorothea of Brunswick-Lüneburg, member of the House of Welf.

== Reign ==
His father's lands were partitioned after his death and Christian received the territory around Bischwiller (German: Bischweiler) in Alsace, at that time part of the Holy Roman Empire.

== First marriage ==
Christian married Magdalena Catherine of Palatinate-Zweibrücken, daughter of Duke John II, on 14 November 1630 and had the following children:

1. unnamed son (13 September 1631)
2. Gustavus Adolph (2 July 1632 – 4 August 1632)
3. John Christian (16 June 1633 – 19 August 1633)
4. Dorothea Catherine (3 July 1634 – 7 December 1715)
5. Louise Sophie (16 August 1635 – 25 September 1691)
6. Christian (1637 – 26 April 1717)
7. John Charles (17 October 1638 – 21 February 1704)
8. Anne Magdalena (14 February 1640 – 12 December 1693)
9. Claire Sybille (20 February 1643 – 27 March 1644)

== Second marriage ==
After the death of his first wife in 1648, Christian married for the second time to Countess Maria Johanna of Helfenstein-Wiesensteig, daughter of Count Rudolph III of Helfenstein-Wiesensteig and his wife, Countess Eleonora of Fürstenberg, widow of Maximilian Adam, Landgrave of Leuchtenberg, on 28 October 1648 and had an unnamed son in 1648.

== Death ==
Christian I died on 6 September 1654, in Neuenstein, aged 55. His second wife Maria Johanna outlived him by eleven years. He was interred, along with both of his wives, in the Reformierte Pfarrkirche (Église protestante de Bischwiller), Bischwiller,

== Ancestry ==
Ancestors of Christian I, Count Palatine of Birkenfeld-Bischweiler

8. Louis II, Count Palatine of Zweibrücken
4. Wolfgang, Count Palatine of Zweibrücken
9. Elisabeth of Hesse
2. Charles I, Count Palatine of Zweibrücken-Birkenfeld
10. Philip I, Landgrave of Hesse
5. Anna of Hesse
11. Christine of Saxony
1. Christian I, Count Palatine of Birkenfeld-Bischweiler
12. Ernest I, Duke of Brunswick-Lüneburg
6. William, Duke of Brunswick-Lüneburg
13. Sophia of Mecklenburg-Schwerin
3. Dorothea of Brunswick-Lüneburg
14. Christian III of Denmark
7. Dorothea of Denmark
15. Dorothea of Saxe-Lauenburg

Regnal titles
Preceded by Charles I	Duke of Birkenfeld-Bischweiler; 1600 – 1654	Succeeded by Christian II in Palatinate-Birkenfeld-Bischweiler
Preceded by Charles I	Duke of Birkenfeld-Bischweiler; 1600 – 1654	Succeeded by John Charles in Palatinate-Birkenfeld-Gelnhausen
