= Palatinate-Birkenfeld-Bischweiler =

State of the Holy Roman Empire

Palatinate-Birkenfeld-Bischweiler Pfalz-Birkenfeld-Bischweiler (German)
- 1600–1671
- Status: State of the Holy Roman Empire
- Capital: Bischwiller
- Common languages: German
- Religion: Calvinism
- Count
  - 1600–1654 (first): Christian I
  - 1654–1671 (last): Christian II
- History
  - Separation from Palatinate-Zweibrücken-Birkenfeld: 1600
  - Separation of Palatinate-Birkenfeld-Gelnhausen: 1654
  - Incorporation into Palatine Zweibrücken: 1671
Preceded by	Succeeded by
Palatinate-Zweibrücken-Birkenfeld	Palatine Zweibrücken; Palatinate-Birkenfeld-Gelnhausen
- Today part of: Germany

Palatinate-Birkenfeld-Bischweiler (Note: German: Pfalz-Birkenfeld-Bischweiler) was a state of the Holy Roman Empire based around Bischwiller. It was formed in 1600, after the separation from Palatinate-Zweibrücken-Birkenfeld and was incorporated into Palatine Zweibrücken in 1731.

== History ==
Palatinate-Birkenfeld-Bischweiler was partitioned from Palatinate-Zweibrücken-Birkenfeld in 1600 for Christian I, the youngest son of Count Palatine Charles I. The state was partitioned into itself and Palatinate-Birkenfeld-Gelnhausen in 1654. In 1671 Count Palatine Christian II inherited Palatinate-Zweibrücken-Birkenfeld and this state ceased to exist.

== List of rulers ==
Name	Reign	Notes
Christian I	1600–1654	
Christian II	1654–1671	Count Palatine of Zweibrücken-Birkenfeld
