= Bischwiller =

Bischwiller Bìschweiler
- Commune
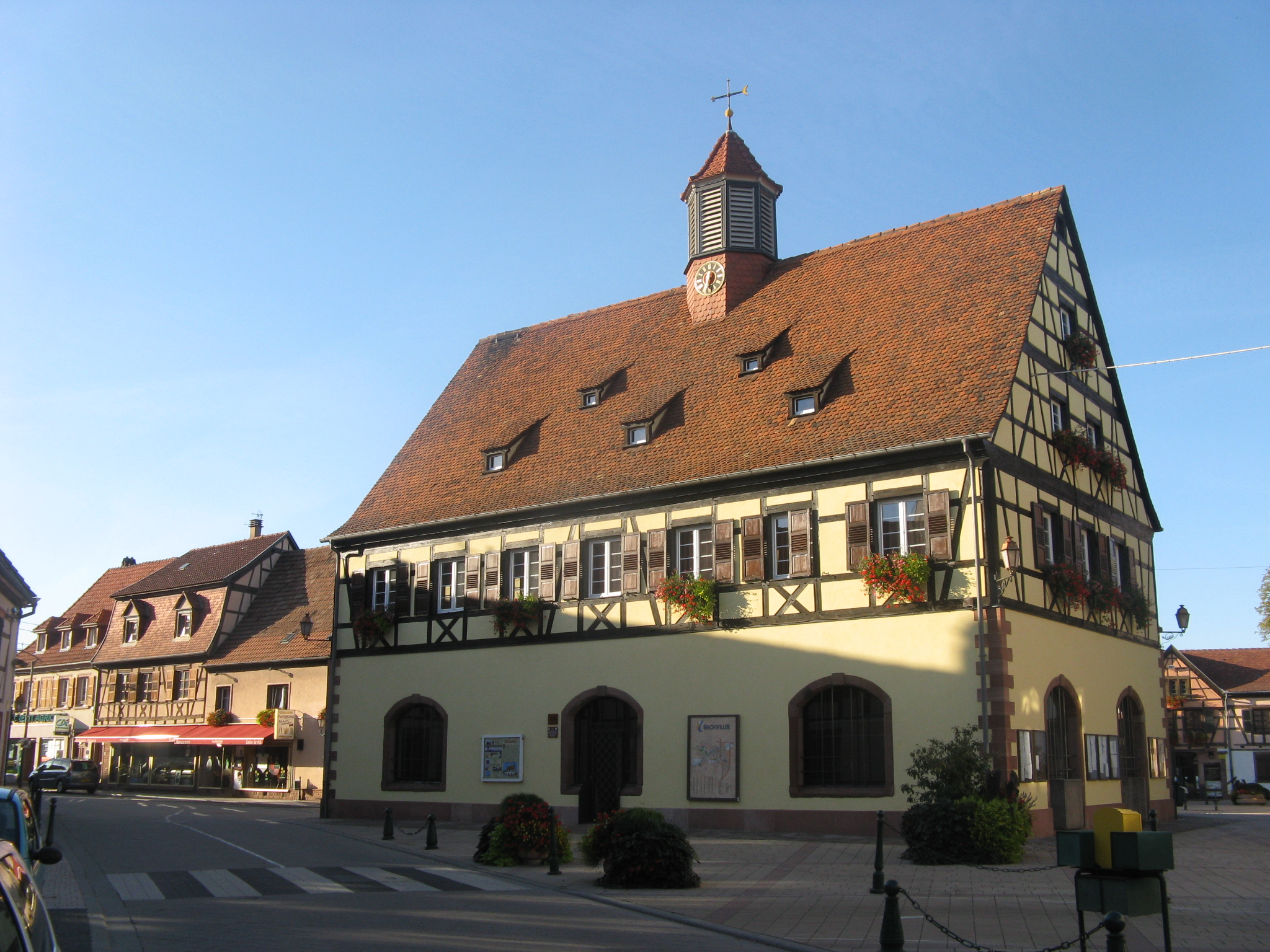
- La Laub, former town hall, now a museum

- Coat of arms
- Location of Bischwiller
- Location within France Location within Grand Est
- Coordinates: 48°46′00″N 7°51′27″E
- Country: France
- Region: Grand Est
- Department: Bas-Rhin
- Arrondissement: Haguenau-Wissembourg
- Canton: Bischwiller
- Intercommunality: CA Haguenau

Government
  - Mayor (2020–2026): Jean-Lucien Netzer
- Area^{1}: 17.25 km^{2} (6.66 sq mi)
- Highest elevation: 147 m (482 ft)
- Lowest elevation: 123 m (404 ft)
- Population (2023): 12,242
  - Density: 709.7/km^{2} (1,838/sq mi)
- Time zone: UTC+01:00 (CET)
  - Summer (DST): UTC+02:00 (CEST)
- INSEE/Postal code: 67046 /67240
- ^{1} French Land Register data, which excludes lakes, ponds, glaciers > 1 km^{2} (0.386 sq mi or 247 acres) and river estuaries.

Bischwiller (French pronunciation: [biʃvilɛʁ]; German: Bischweiler; Alsatian: Bíschwiller) (Note: Also spelt Bishweiller in some older sources.) is a commune in the Bas-Rhin department in Grand Est in northeastern France, just west of the river Moder.

== Geography ==
The city is 7.8 kilometers (4.8 mi) southeast of Haguenau, 8 kilometers (5.0 mi) west-northwest of the German border and the Rhine (Rhin), and lies 22 kilometers (14 mi) north-northeast of Strasbourg.

The Moder, a Rhine tributary, flows across the town. Among the other streams which cross the area can be cited the following tributaries of the Moder: the Rothbaechel, the Erlengraben and the Waschgraben. The last one is formed by the confluence of two smaller streams named Weihergraben and Schnuchgraben.

== Population ==
Due to its large Turkish minority, Bischwiller has been pejoratively dubbed "Turcwiller" or "Bischtanbul".

Historical population

Year	Pop.	±% p.a.
1793	3,250	—
1800	3,449	+0.85%
1806	3,902	+2.08%
1821	4,806	+1.40%
1831	5,927	+2.12%
1836	5,854	−0.25%
1841	5,721	−0.46%
1846	6,260	+1.82%
1851	6,642	+1.19%
1856	7,676	+2.94%
1861	8,780	+2.72%
1866	9,911	+2.45%
1871	9,220	−1.44%
1875	7,102	−6.32%
1880	6,827	−0.79%
1885	6,815	−0.04%
1890	7,014	+0.58%
1895	7,304	+0.81%
1900	7,897	+1.57%

Year	Pop.	±% p.a.
1905	8,279	+0.95%
1910	8,149	−0.32%
1921	7,210	−1.11%
1926	8,142	+2.46%
1931	8,059	−0.20%
1936	8,248	+0.46%
1946	7,581	−0.84%
1954	7,843	+0.43%
1962	8,198	+0.55%
1968	8,780	+1.15%
1975	9,653	+1.36%
1982	10,612	+1.36%
1990	10,969	+0.41%
1999	11,596	+0.62%
2007	12,659	+1.10%
2012	12,643	−0.03%
2017	12,538	−0.17%
2023	12,242	−0.40%

Source: EHESS and INSEE (1968-2023)

== Culture ==
- Maison des Arts (Bischwiller)
- Musée de la Laub

== Personalities ==
- Claude Vigée, poet
- Jacob Kirkman and Abraham Kirkman, harpsichord makers
- Jean Daum, glassware manufacturer
- Lucien Muller, footballer
- Otto Meißner, German politician
- Christian Goodnight (born Christian Gutknecht) is a direct-line ancestor of former U.S. President Barack Obama.

== Photo gallery ==
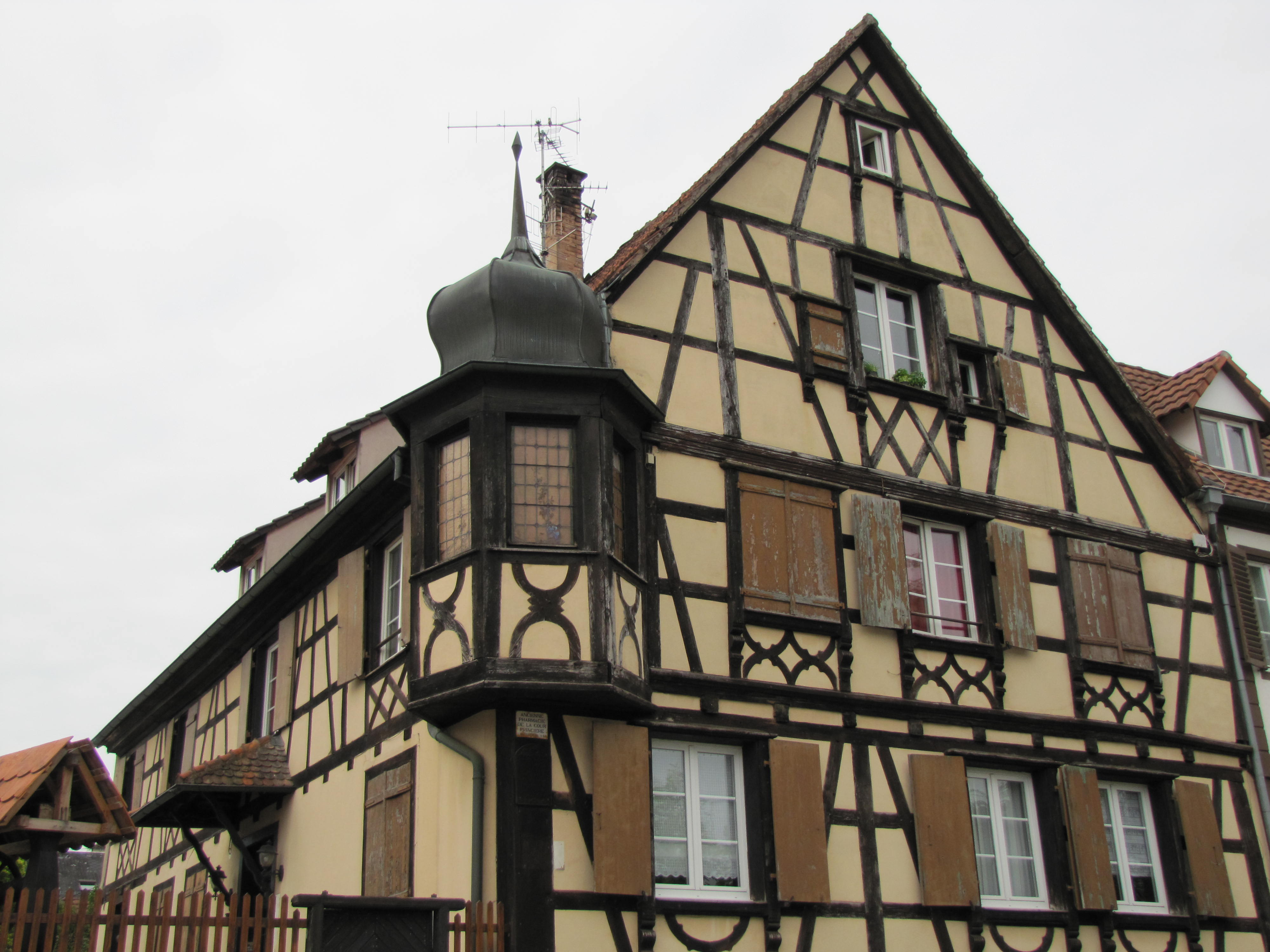
Ancient timber-framed pharmacy

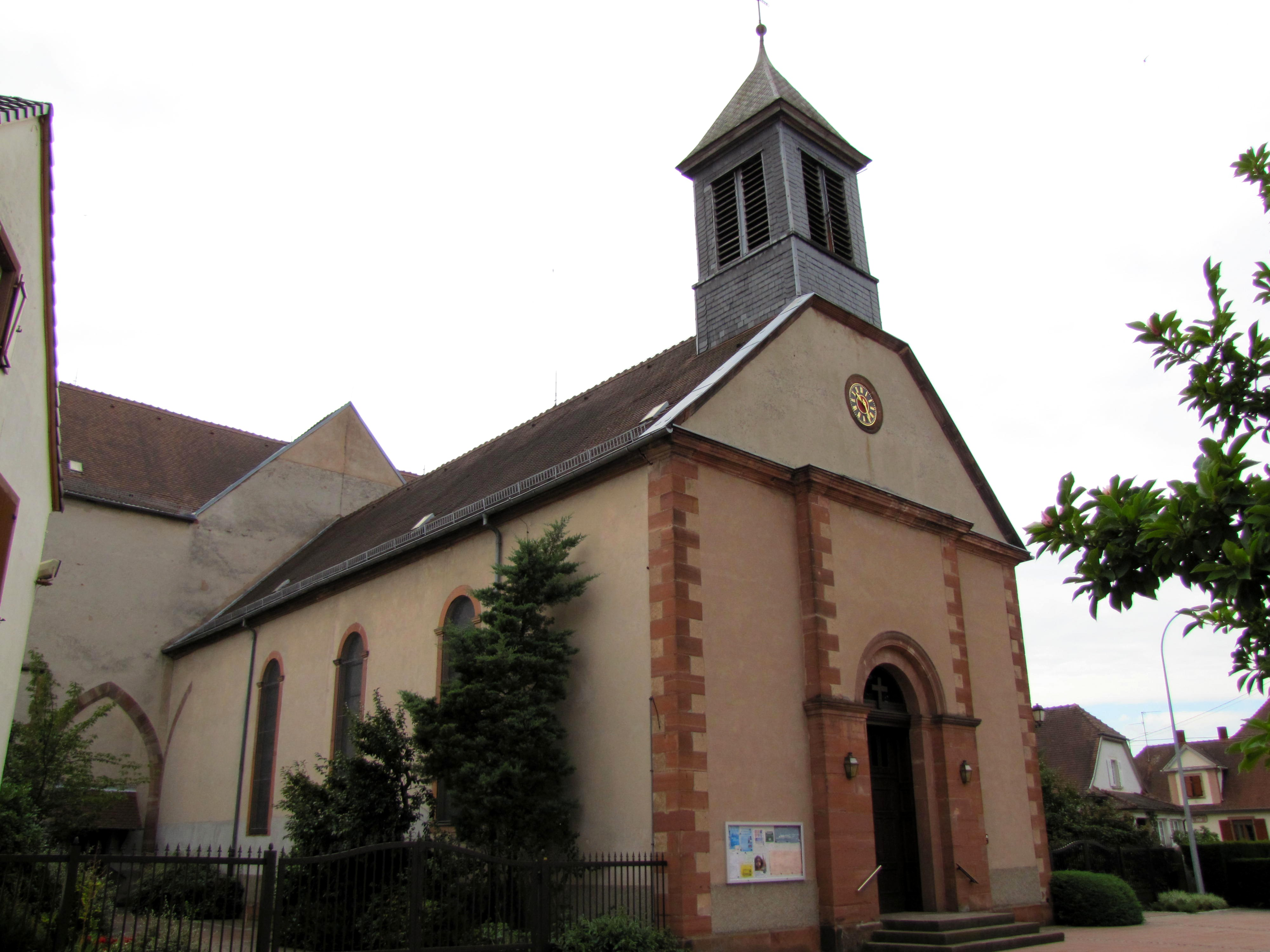
Saint-Augustin church

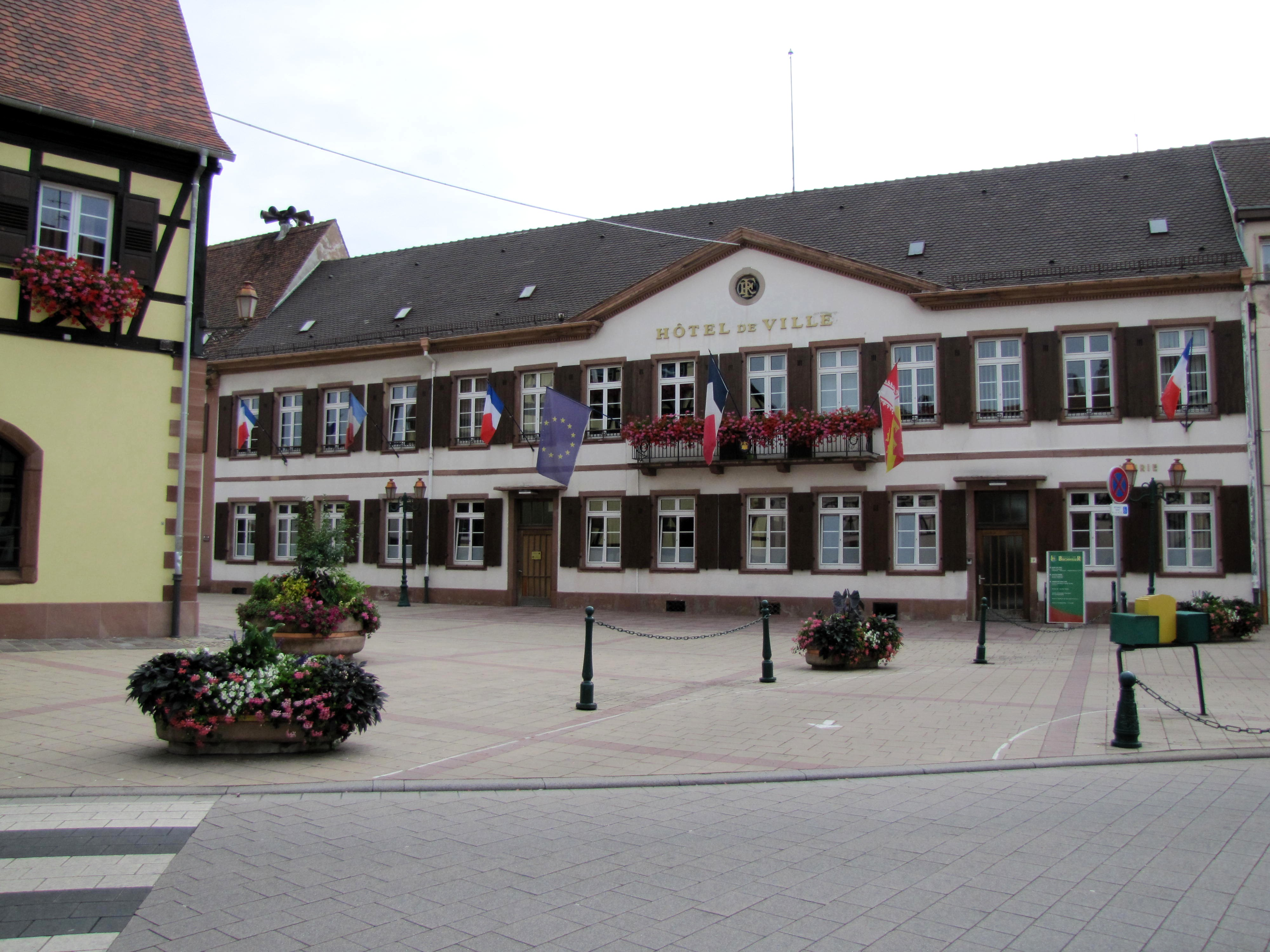
Bischwiller town hall

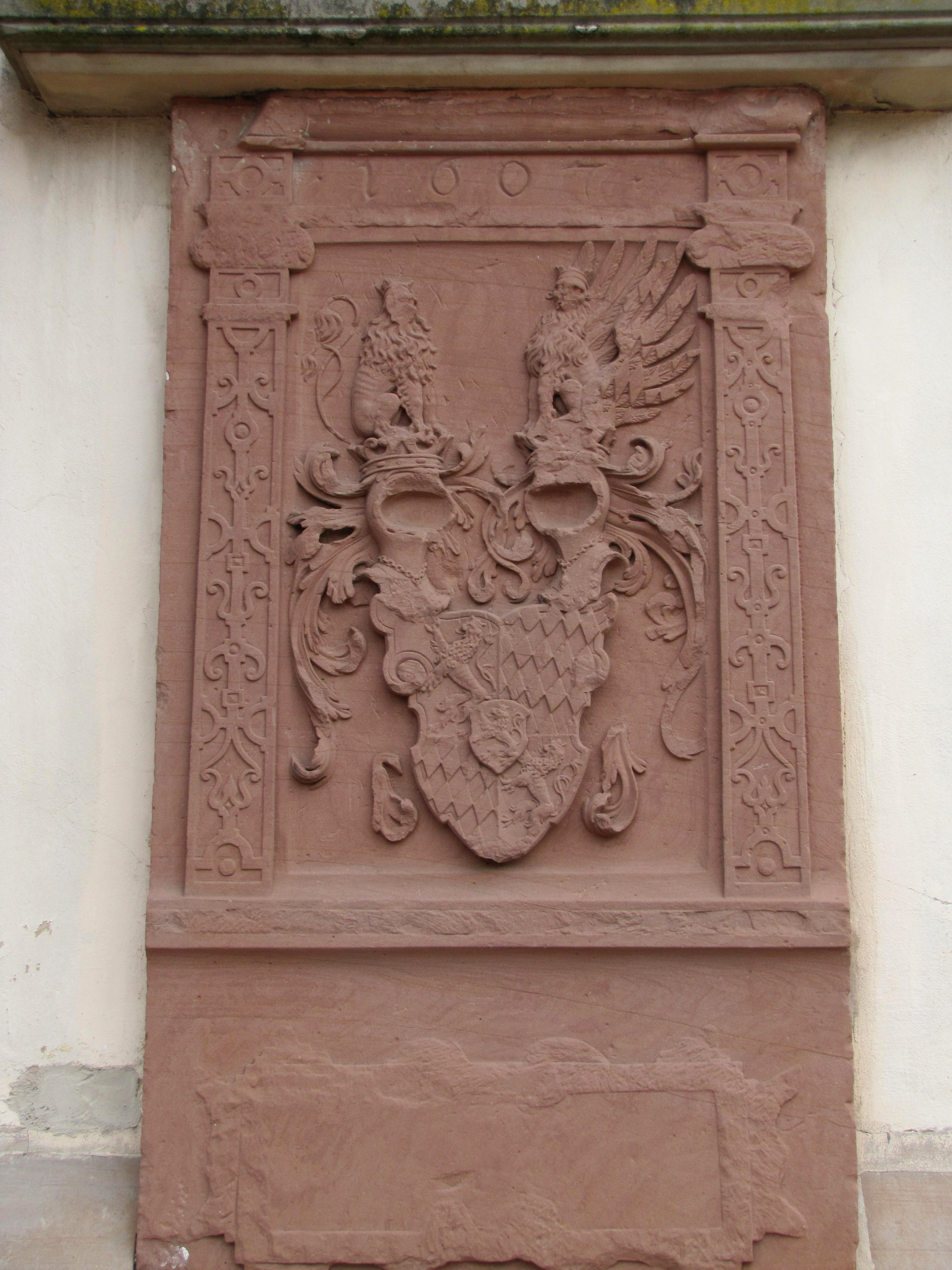
Protestant temple: tombstone of John I, Count Palatine of Zweibrücken (died in 1604) tombstone

== See also ==
- Communes of the Bas-Rhin department
