= Ottweiler =

- Town
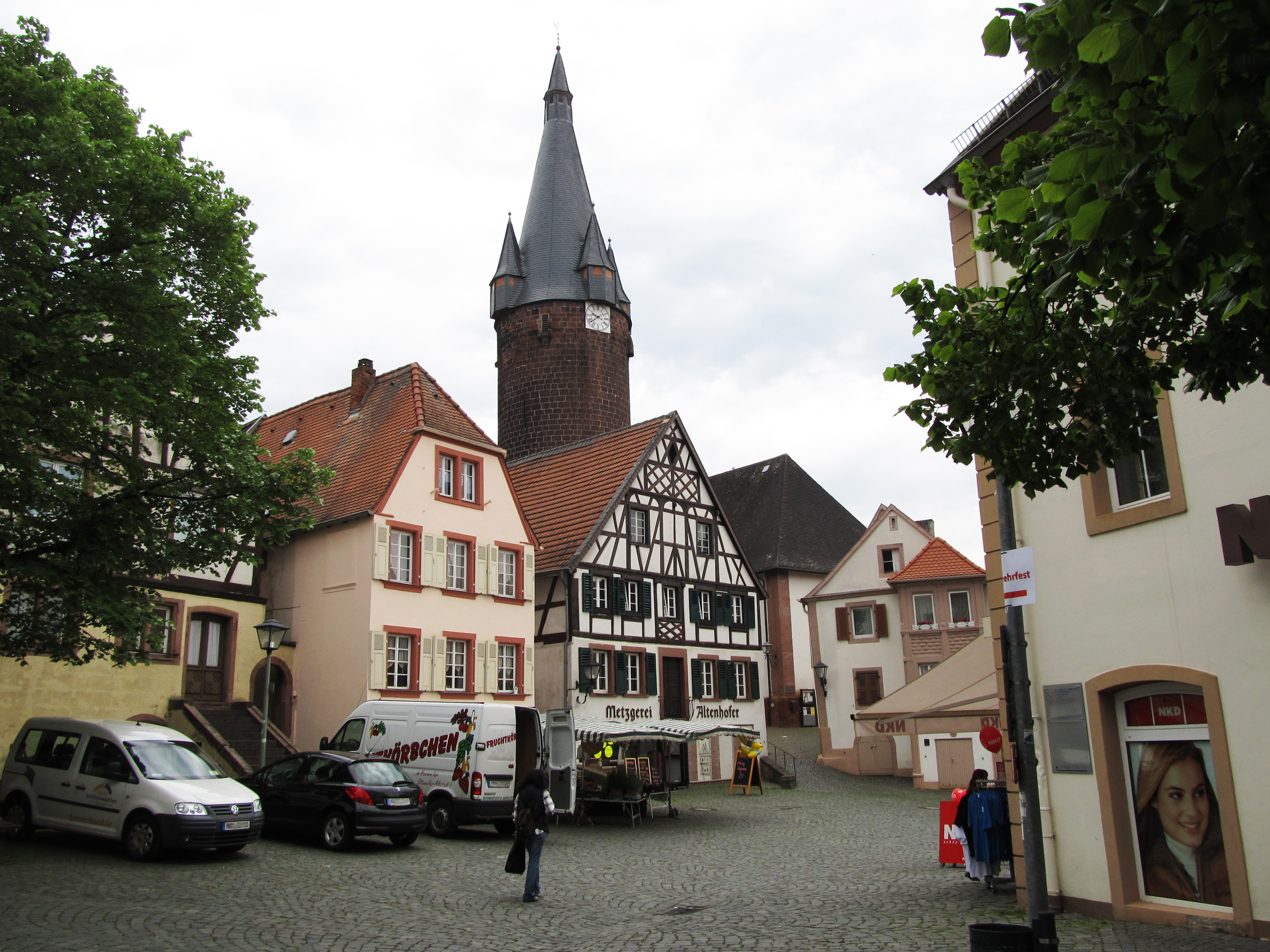
- Town square with the Old Tower in the background

- Flag Coat of arms

- Location of Ottweiler within Neunkirchen district
- Interactive map of Ottweiler
- Location within Germany Location within Saarland
- Coordinates: 49°22′N 7°10′E
- Country: Germany
- State: Saarland
- District: Neunkirchen
- Subdivisions: 5

Government
  - Mayor (2019–29): Holger Schäfer (CDU)

Area
  - Total: 45.56 km^{2} (17.59 sq mi)
- Elevation: 268 m (879 ft)

Population (2025-12-31)
  - Total: 14,177
  - Density: 311.2/km^{2} (805.9/sq mi)
- Time zone: UTC+01:00 (CET)
  - Summer (DST): UTC+02:00 (CEST)
- Postal codes: 66564
- Dialling codes: 06824, 06858
- Vehicle registration: NK
- Website: www.ottweiler.de

Ottweiler (German pronunciation: [ˈɔtvaɪlɐ]) is a municipality, former seat of the district of Neunkirchen, in Saarland, Germany. It is situated on the river Blies, approx. 7 km north of Neunkirchen, and 25 km northeast of Saarbrücken.

== Culture ==
The town is notable for the Ottweiler porcelain.

The Ottweiler Brewing Company was founded in Ottweiler in 1873. It was moved to the Karlsberg Brewery in Homburg in 1983.

== People ==
- Ludwig Steeg (1894-1945), politician, mayor from Berlin from 1940-1945
- Damhat Sisamci (born 1993), politician

== Transport ==
Bundestrasse 420 and Bundestrasse 41 pass through the town. The local train station sees regular service to nearby cities Saarbrücken and Frankfurt.
