= Duke Franz Joseph in Bavaria =

Duke Franz Joseph
- Duke in Bavaria
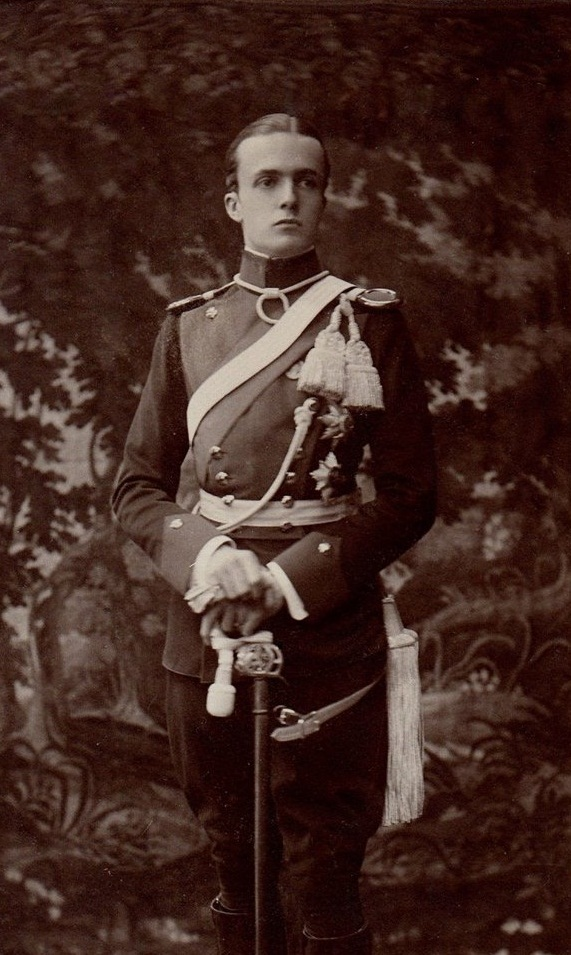
- Franz Joseph in 1909
- Born: 23 March 1888; Schloss Tegernsee, Kingdom of Bavaria
- Died: 23 September 1912 (aged 24); Munich, Kingdom of Bavaria
Names
- German: Franz Joseph Michael Karl Maria Evaristus Quirinus Ottokar
- House: House of Wittelsbach
- Father: Duke Karl Theodor in Bavaria
- Mother: Infanta Maria José of Portugal

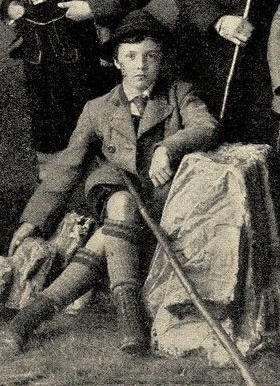
Duke Franz Joseph in Bavaria in 1897

Duke Franz Joseph in Bavaria (23 March 1888 – 23 September 1912) was a Duke in Bavaria and member of the House of Wittelsbach. He was the fifth and youngest child of Duke Karl Theodor in Bavaria and Infanta Maria José of Portugal. Franz Joseph was the brother of Duke Ludwig Wilhelm in Bavaria and sisters Duchess Amalie in Bavaria, Duchess Sophie Adelheid in Bavaria, Duchess Elisabeth in Bavaria and Duchess Marie Gabrielle in Bavaria.

== Biography ==
=== Career ===
The Duke was a first lieutenant in Kaiser Wilhelm's own regiment of Uhlans, and a special instructor in the royal military riding academy in Munich. His horsemanship won him many prizes in German riding competitions.

=== Trip to America, 1910 ===
Duke Franz Josef in Bavaria visited the US in 1910 and hunted grizzly bears. The US press speculated on a possible American match, and the speculation was furthered when Franz Joseph commented on his cousin Prince Miguel's American bride, Anita Stewart. He also told the papers nothing would 'stand in the way' of an American match, though it wasn't the purpose of the visit. Before heading out west, he was widely feted in East Coast society.

Duke Franz Josef also spent time in New York City, where he stayed at the Plaza, and he was the "most-talked-about nobleman" to visit the US since Prince Henry of Prussia. Franz did not stand on ceremony. He liked to stroll about the city without his "suite of servants." He took in boxing matches, "took a look behind the scenes in the leading Broadway comic operas," and was commented on as being "highly pleased" with American chorus girls. The local media hailed the duke as "the most democratic nobleman that had ever landed in New York." Franz Josef was introduced to numerous American debutantes, but left the country without "tales of romance." He explained that he could not marry an American "unless he chose to lose his standing in the ducal family at home."

=== Personal life and death ===
Franz Josef remained unmarried until his death in 1912, at the age of 24. He was previously engaged to Archduchess Elisabeth Franziska of Austria, but it was broken off in April 1912. Franz Joseph died of polio in 1912, the same year as his sisters Marie Gabrielle and Amélie.

Despite being unmarried, through his relationship with Caroline "Lilly" Stockhammer, he became the progenitor of the von Plottnitz-Stockhammer family, which has produced descendants prominent in politics, education, and the arts. He is the grandfather of the German politician Rupert von Plottnitz.
