= Duke in Bavaria =

Princely title of the House of Wittelsbach

Duke in Bavaria (German: Herzog in Bayern) was a title best known for its use by the Wittelsbach Counts Palatine of Zweibrücken-Birkenfeld. The title was established in 1506, and grew in importance in the 19th century, after Duke Wilhelm in Bavaria began to use it as his primary title. Since the abolition of nobility in the Weimar Constitution, Duke in Bavaria has endured as a courtesy title. It is distinct from the title Duke of Bavaria.

== Since 1799 ==
On 16 February 1799, the head of the House of Wittelsbach Charles Theodore of Bavaria died without legitimate issue. Wittelsbach had been the ruling house of Bavaria since 1180 with the title of a Duke of Bavaria, and the higher title of an Elector of the Holy Roman Empire since 1623. As after the Landshut War of Succession primogeniture was established, there could only be one Duke of Bavaria anymore, resulting in the unprecedented decision to create a title of Duke in Bavaria for the rest of the family, which all members of the House took for themselves, even the older Palatine branch – the other major Wittelsbach possession. Reversely, all Wittelsbachs were also Counts Palatine by Rhine. After the death of Charles Theodore, who had unified Bavaria with the Palatinate and the other major possessions of Jülich and Berg in his person, two cadet branches were surviving: one headed by Maximilian I Joseph, Count Palatine of Zweibrücken, the other by William, Count Palatine of Gelnhausen, and both Zweibrücken and Gelnhausen were occupied by the French, which might explain why the custom was abandoned to name cadet branches by the title of their cadet possessions no matter how small.

They both agreed in the House Treaty of Ansbach that the Wittelsbach inheritances should be indivisible further on. Maximilian Joseph, being from the senior branch, inherited Charles Theodor's title of Elector of Bavaria, while William, his brother-in-law in addition to rather distant a relative, was compensated with the title of Duke in Bavaria. As head of a specific family branch, it is possible since to speak somewhat paradoxically of The Duke in Bavaria. When Wittelsbach became a Royal House, the Dukes in Bavaria were lifted to the dignity of a Royal Highness. Then if not earlier, the title of Duke in Bavaria came into formal disuse by the Royal branch, who were quite content to be Princes of Bavaria. It should be kept in mind that even if we commonly speak of a Royal and a Ducal branch of the House, it was clear that the Dukes as well were of royal rank, and to make things more complicated, the head of the royal branch is now again called the Duke: the Duke of Bavaria, of course. Among the notable members of the Ducal branch were Duke Max who, a talented Zither player and composer himself, ranks among the most important promoters of Bavarian folk-music; his daughters Empress Elisabeth of Austria, Queen of Hungary and Queen Maria of the Two Sicilies, his granddaughter Queen Elisabeth of Belgium; and in more recent times Sophie, Hereditary Princess of Liechtenstein.

In 1965 there were only two male members of the family, Duke Ludwig Wilhelm and his cousin Duke Luitpold; both were elderly and had no children. On 18 March 1965 Duke Ludwig Wilhelm adopted Prince Max of Bavaria, the second son of Albrecht, Duke of Bavaria and the grandson of Ludwig Wilhelm's sister Marie Gabrielle. From this point onwards Max has used the surname "Herzog in Bayern" in place of the surname "Prinz von Bayern". Max has five daughters, including the Sophie mentioned already, all of whom were born with the surname "Herzogin in Bayern".

== Ancestors ==
Wilhelm, the first Duke in Bavaria, was descended from the line of Palatinate-Zweibrücken-Birkenfeld-Gelnhausen. His ancestors were:

- Wolfgang, Count Palatine of Zweibrücken (1526–1569), m. Anna of Hesse.
  - Charles I, Count Palatine of Zweibrücken-Birkenfeld (1560–1600), fifth son of Wolfgang, m. Dorothea of Brunswick-Lüneburg
    - Christian I, Count Palatine of Zweibrücken-Bischweiler (1598–1654), third son of Karl, m. his cousin Magdalene Catherine of Zweibrücken, a daughter of John II, Count Palatine of Zweibrücken and Cathérine de Rohan.
      - John Charles, Count Palatine of Gelnhausen (1638–1704), second surviving son of Christian I, m. Esther Marie of Witzleben. They were parents of several sons.
        - John, Count Palatine of Gelnhausen (1698–1780), second son of John Charles, m. Sophie Charlotte of Salm-Dhaun, father of William, Duke in Bavaria.

== Dukes in Bavaria ==
The members of the family used the title Duke or Duchess in Bavaria, with the style of Royal Highness. If we take 1799 as the beginning of somewhat a House of its own, the heads of this house were:

- William (1799–1837), previously the Count Palatinate of Gelnhausen since 1789
- Pius August (1837), only son of William, died seven months after his father
- Max Joseph (1837–1888), only son of Pius Augustus
- Charles Theodore (1888–1909), second son of Max Joseph
- Louis William (1909–1968), first son of Charles Theodore
  - Luitpold Emanuel (died 16 January 1973), grandson of Max Joseph, was the last agnatic member of the family, but did not succeed as head
- Max Emanuel (1968–), adopted by Louis William from the Royal branch of the dynasty, non-agnatic relative through his grandmother Duchess Marie Gabrielle in Bavaria, the fourth daughter of Charles Theodore; he has five daughters (including Sophie, Hereditary Princess of Liechtenstein) but no sons
  - Franz, Duke of Bavaria (born 1933) his elder brother and head of the whole dynasty, is heir presumptive, but was not adopted by Louis William

== Family tree ==
- Wilhelm (1752–1837), second son of Johann, m. 1780 Countess Palatine Maria Anna of Zweibrücken-Birkenfeld (1753–1824), and had issue:
  - Duchess Maria Elisabeth Amalie Franziska (1784-1849), m. 1808 Louis Alexandre Berthier, sovereign Prince of Neuchâtel (1753-1815), and had issue.
  - Pius August (1786-1837), m. 1807 Princess and Duchess Amélie Louise of Arenberg (1789-1823), and had issue:
    - Maximilian Joseph (1808-1888), m. 1828 Princess Ludovika of Bavaria (1808-1892) and had issue:
      - Ludwig Wilhelm (1831-1920), left morganatic issue through his surviving daughters.
      - Wilhelm Karl (1832-1833).
      - Helene (1834-1890), m. 1858 Maximilian Anton Lamoral, Hereditary Prince of Thurn and Taxis (1831-1867) and had issue.
      - Elisabeth (1837-1898), m. 1854 Emperor Franz Josef of Austria (1830-1916) and had issue.
      - Karl Theodor (1839-1909), m. 1865 Princess Sophie of Saxony (1845-1867) and had issue:
        - Amalie Marie (1865-1912), m. 1892 Duke Wilhelm of Urach (1864-1928) and had issue.
      - m. secondly 1874 Infanta Maria Josefa of Portugal (1857-1943) and had further issue:
        - Sophie (1875-1957), m. 1898 Count Hans Viet of Toerring-Jettenbach (1862-1929) and had issue.
        - Elisabeth (1876-1965), m. 1900 King Albert I of the Belgians (1875-1934) and had issue.
        - Marie Gabrielle (1878-1912), m. 1900 Crown Prince Rupprecht of Bavaria (1869-1955) and had issue including the dynasty's head Albrecht, Duke of Bavaria (1905-1996).
        - Ludwig Wilhelm (1884-1968), m. 1917 Princess Eleonore of Sayn-Wittgenstein-Berleburg (1880-1965); in 1965 he adopted his grand-nephew:
          - Prince Max of Bavaria (born 1937), second son of Albrecht, Duke of Bavaria (1905-1996) and Countess Maria Draskovich of Trakostjan (1904-1969), m. 1967 Countess Elizabeth Douglas (born 1940) and has issue:
            - Sophie (born 1967), m. 1993 Hereditary Prince Alois of Liechtenstein (born 1968) and has issue.
            - Marie Caroline (born 1969), m. 1991 Duke Philipp of Württemberg (born 1964) and has issue.
            - Helene (born 1972).
            - Elizabeth (born 1973), m. firstly in 2004 Daniel Terberger (born 1967) and has issue.
            - Anna (born 1975), m. firstly in 2007 Klaus Runow (born 1964) and has issue. Later divorced and secondly married in 2015 Baron Andreas von Maltzahn (born 1964).
          - Franz, Duke of Bavaria (born 1933), first son of Albrecht, Duke of Bavaria (1905-1996) and Countess Maria Draskovich of Trakostjan (1904-1969) and the dynasty head, not adopted by his grand-uncle Ludwig Wilhelm, but heir presumptive to his brother
        - Franz Josef (1888-1912).
      - Maria Sophie (1841-1925), m. 1859 King Francesco II of the Two Sicilies (1836-1894) and had issue.
      - Mathilde Ludovika (1843-1925), m. 1861 Prince Lodovico of the Two Sicilies, Count of Trani (1838-1886) and had issue.
      - Sophie Charlotte (1847-1897), m. 1868 Prince Ferdinand of Orléans, Duke of Alençon (1844-1910) and had issue.
      - Maximilian Emanuel (1849-1893), m. 1875 Princess Amalie of Saxe-Coburg and Gotha (1848-1894) and had issue:
        - Siegfried (1876-1952).
        - Christoph (1879-1963), m. 1924 Anna Sibig (1874-1958).
        - Luitpold (1890-1973), the last member of the original family

== Homes ==
In 1813 Duke Wilhelm in Bavaria acquired a former monastery after its secularisation, the Franconian Banz Abbey. His grandson Duke Maximilian Joseph in Bavaria purchased Possenhofen Castle on Lake Starnberg which became his major residence and where his children, notably the later Empress Elisabeth of Austria, Queen of Hungary ("Sisi"), were brought up. In 1838 he acquired Unterwittelsbach Castle (today housing a "Sisi" museum) near the site of Burg Wittelsbach, the ancestral seat of the House of Wittelsbach. His wife, Princess Ludovika of Bavaria, daughter of King Maximilian I Joseph of Bavaria, inherited the Upper Bavarian Tegernsee Abbey, purchased in 1817 by king Maximilian I Joseph, together with the nearby bath house at Kreuth.

Luitpold Emanuel Ludwig Maria, Duke in Bavaria (1890-1973), the last issue of the in Bavaria junior branch, sold Possenhofen and Schloss Biederstein in Munich in order to finance his late romantic Schloss Ringberg, which he eventually left as inheritance to the Max Planck Society. His cousin Duke Ludwig Wilhelm in Bavaria, also childless, in 1965 adopted a grandson of his sister Marie Gabrielle, who had married Rupprecht, Crown Prince of Bavaria, Prince Max Emanuel of Bavaria of the senior royal branch, who inherited the estates at Banz, Tegernsee and Kreuth from his uncle and, from his father's side, Wildenwart Castle near Frasdorf, which had been purchased by Francis V, Duke of Modena in 1862 who left it to his niece, the Bavarian Queen Maria Theresa.

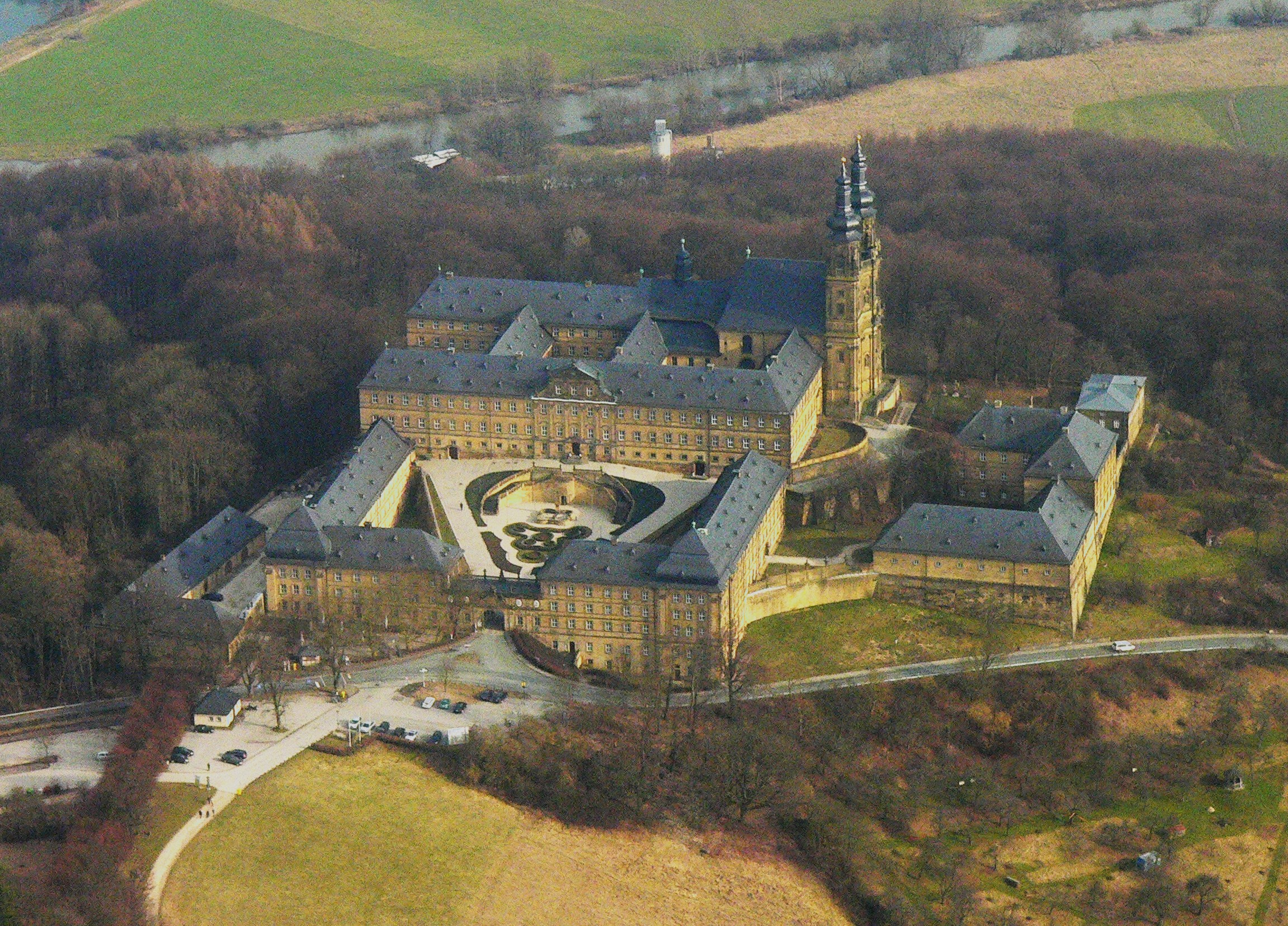
Banz Abbey

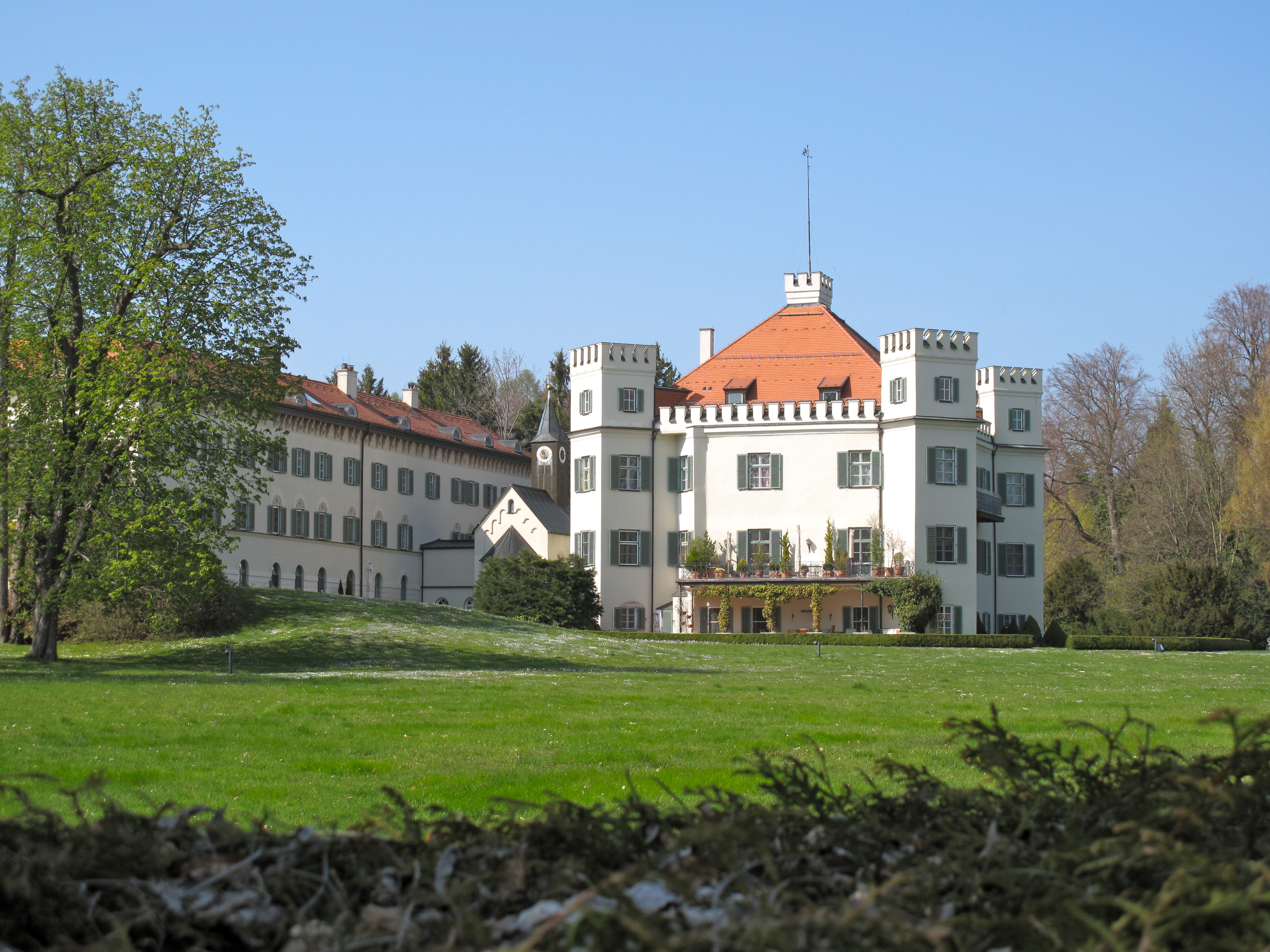
Possenhofen Castle

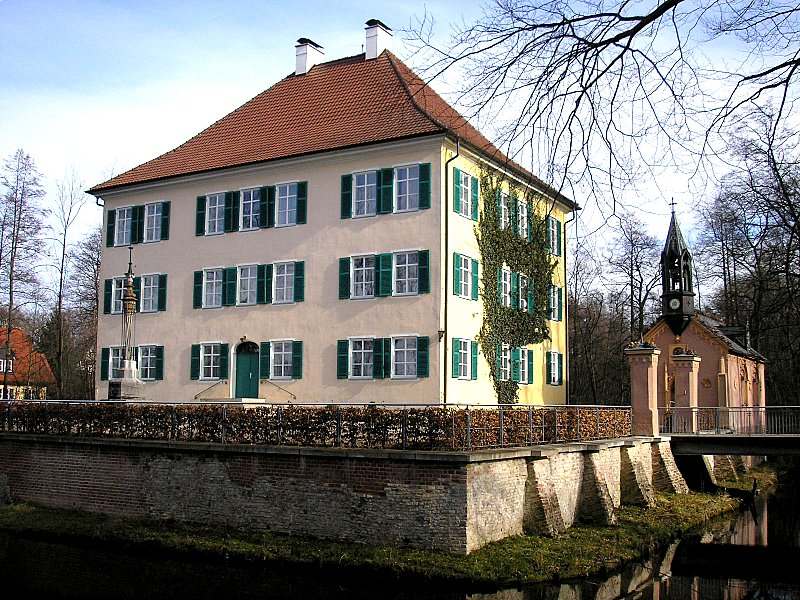
Unterwittelsbach Castle

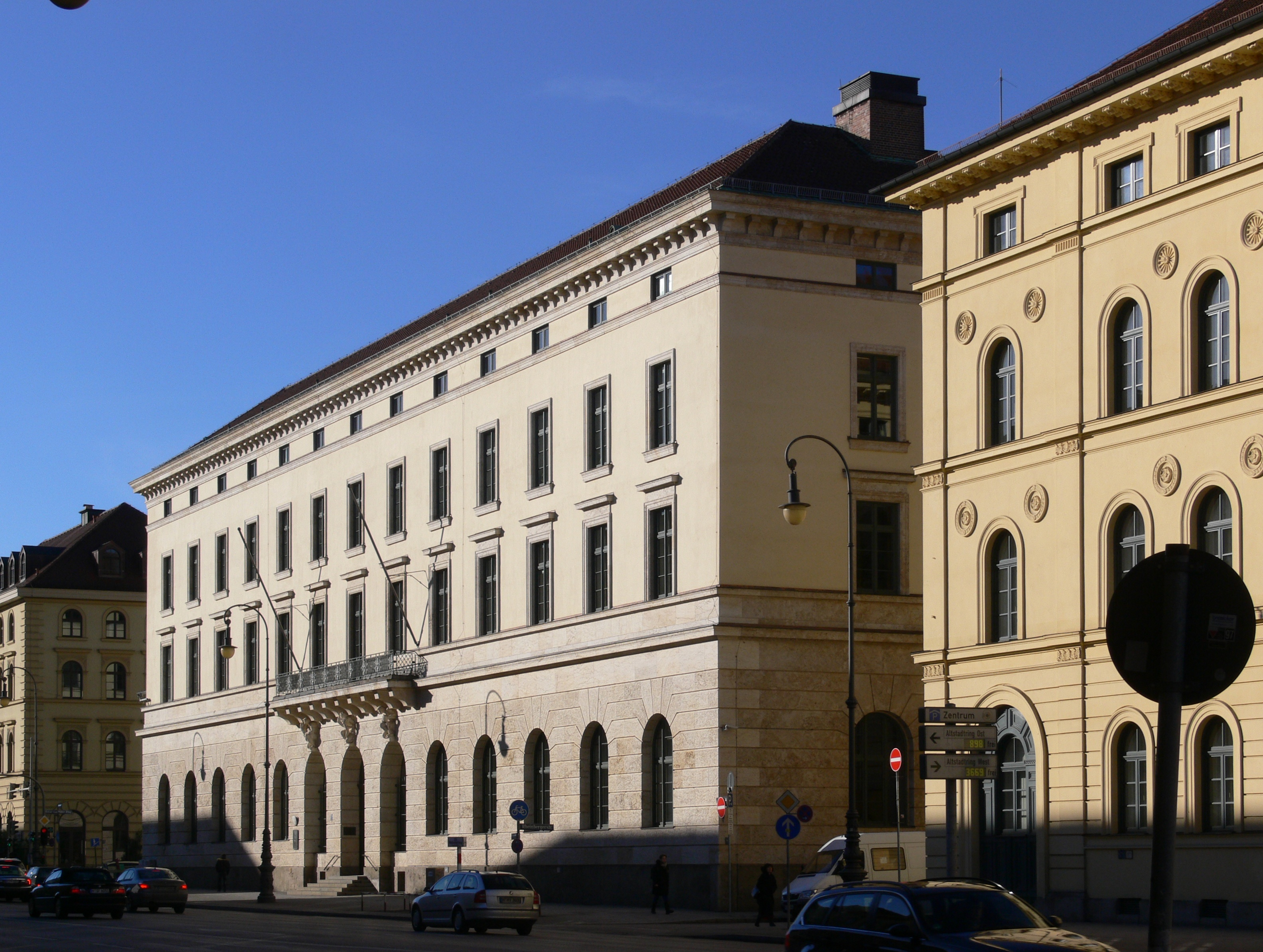
The house of Duke Maximilian Joseph in Munich

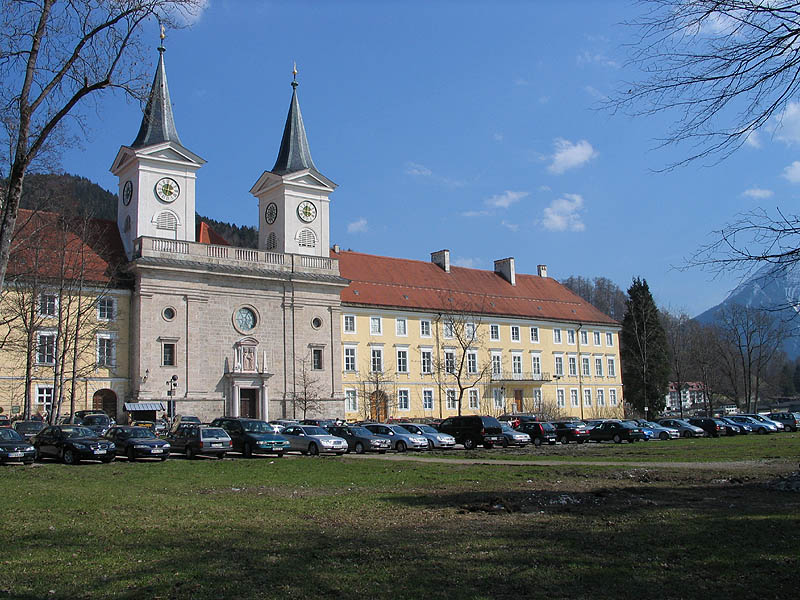
Tegernsee Abbey

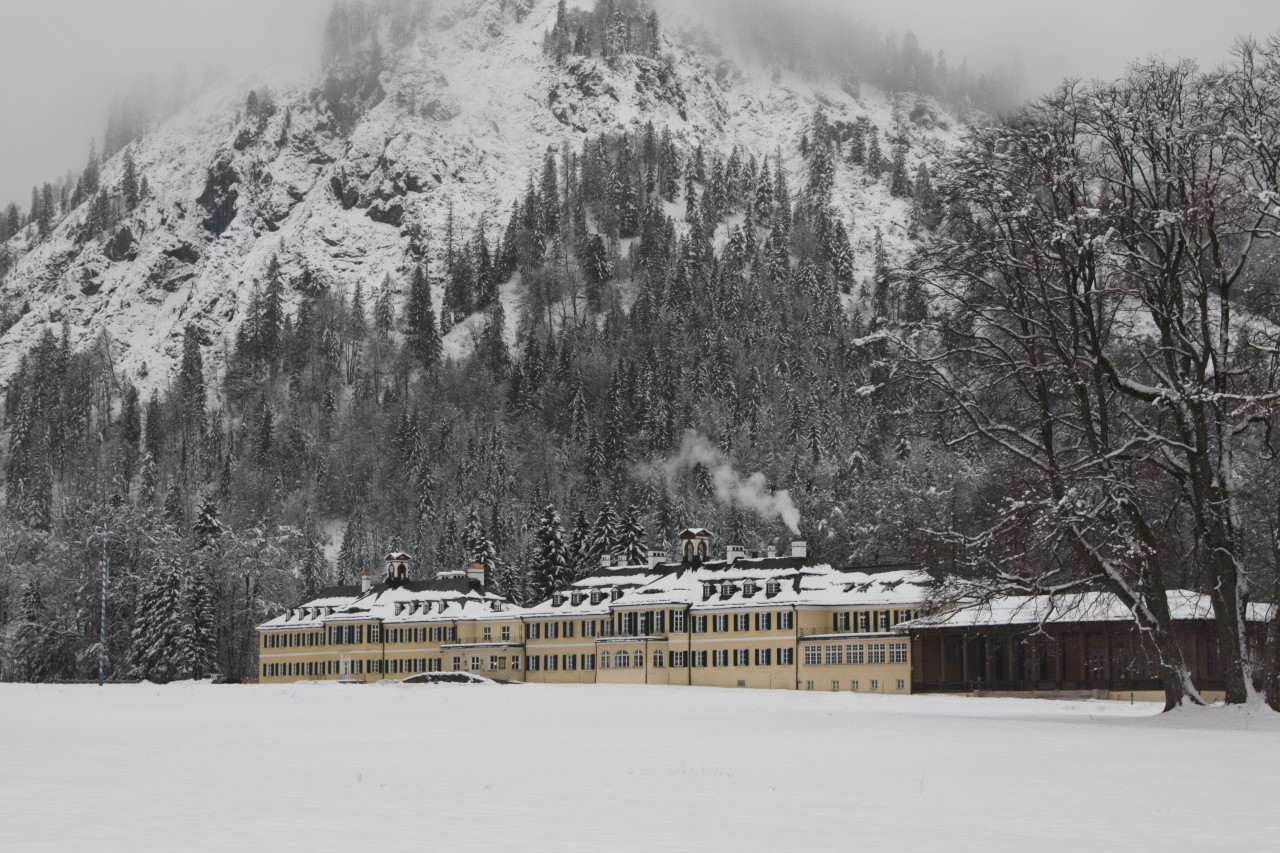
The bath house ("Wildbad") Kreuth

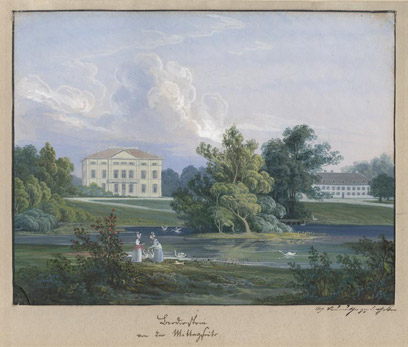
The new and the old castle Biederstein, Munich

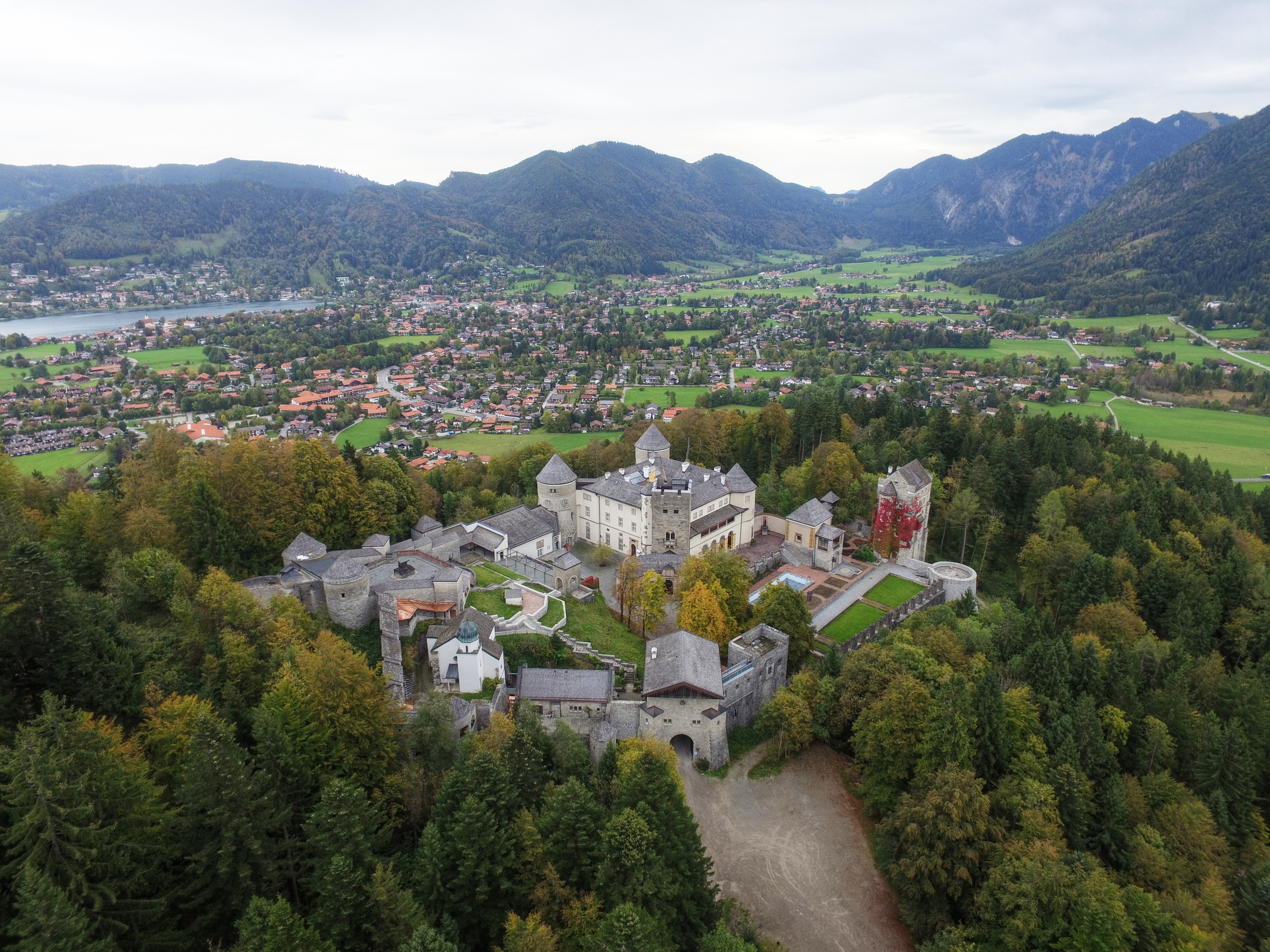
Schloss Ringberg on Lake Tegernsee

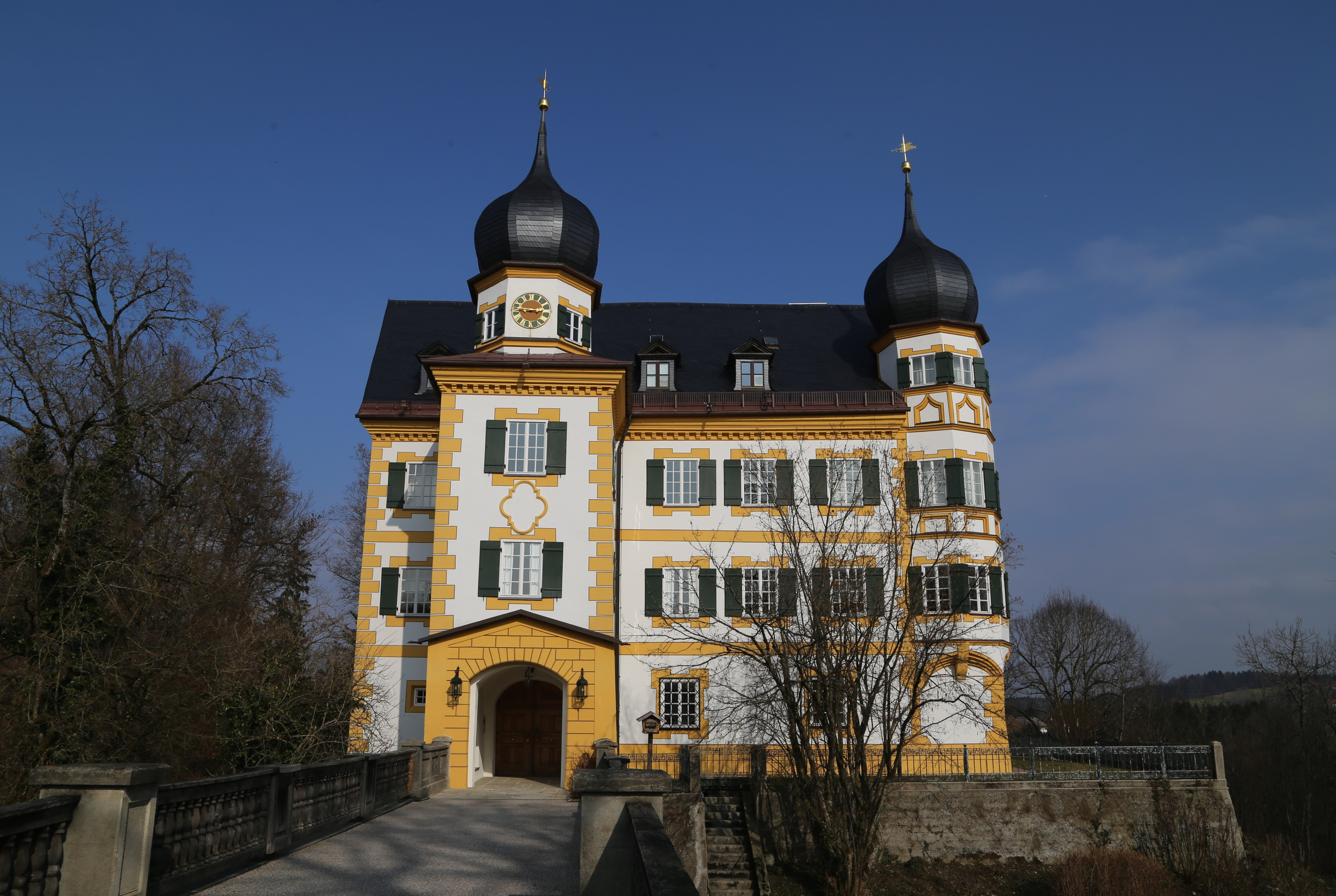
Wildenwart Castle
