= Duchess Sophie Adelheid in Bavaria =

Bavarian duchess and noblewoman (1875–1957)

Duchess Sophie Adelheid
- Countess of Toerring-Jettenbach
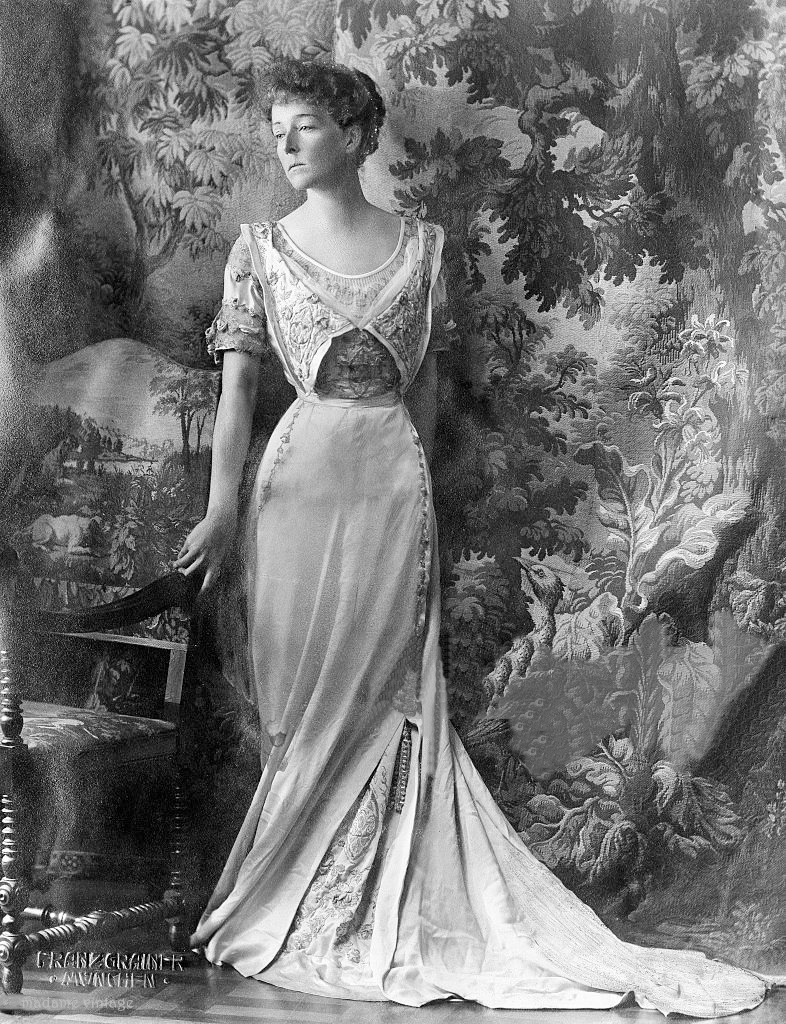
- Sophie Adelheid in 1900s
- Born: 22 February 1875; Possenhofen Castle, Kingdom of Bavaria
- Died: 15 May 1957 (aged 82); Schloss Seefeld, West Germany
- Spouse: Hans Veit, Count of Toerring-Jettenbach (m. 1898; died 1929)
- Issue: Count Carl Theodor of Toerring-Jettenbach; Countess Antonia of Toerring-Jettenbach; Count Hans Heribert of Toerring-Jettenbach
Names
- Sophie Adelheid Ludovika Maria
- House: House of Wittelsbach
- Father: Duke Karl Theodor in Bavaria
- Mother: Infanta Maria José of Portugal
- Religion: Roman Catholic

Duchess Sophie Adelheid in Bavaria (22 February 1875 – 15 May 1957) was a member of the House of Wittelsbach and the second child of the famed ophthalmologist Duke Karl Theodor in Bavaria. She was the elder sister of Queen Elisabeth of the Belgians and Princess Ruppercht of Bavaria.

== Early life ==
Sophie Adelheid was born at Possenhofen Castle, the ancestral home of her branch of the family. Her father was the brother of Empress Elisabeth of Austria ("Sisi"). Her mother was Infanta Maria José of Portugal, was a daughter of King Miguel I of Portugal.

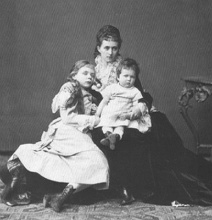
Sophie and her mother with her stepsister Amalie

She grew up in a highly intellectual and artistic environment. Her father, despite his high rank, practiced as a surgeon and founded the Auli-Klinik, where Sophie Adelheid and her sisters often assisted with charitable works.

== Marriage and issue ==
On 26 July 1898, Sophie Adelheid married Hans Veit, Count of Toerring-Jettenbach (1862–1929) at Schloss Tegernsee. The Toerring-Jettenbach family was one of the oldest mediatized houses in Bavaria.

The couple had three children:

- Count Carl Theodor of Toerring-Jettenbach (1900–1967), who married Princess Elizabeth of Greece and Denmark, the middle sister of Princess Marina, Duchess of Kent. Carl Theodor and Elizabeth are the maternal grandparents of Sophie Habsburg.
- Countess Antonia of Toerring-Jettenbach (1902–1988), married Anton Woerner.
- Count Hans Heribert of Toerring-Jettenbach (1903–1977), who married Victoria Lindpaintner (and later Baroness Maria Immaculata Waldbott von Bassenheim).

== Later life ==
After her husband's death in 1929, Sophie Adelheid resided at Schloss Seefeld, where she remained a prominent figure in Bavarian aristocratic circles. She maintained a very close lifelong correspondence with her sister, Queen Elisabeth of the Belgians, and her brother-in-law, King Albert I.

She survived the upheavals of World War II and lived to see her grandson, Count Hans Veit, take over the family estates. She died in Seefeld in 1957 at the age of 82.

== Ancestry ==
Ancestors of Duchess Sophie Adelheid in Bavaria

8. Duke Pius August in Bavaria
4. Duke Maximilian Joseph in Bavaria
9. Princess Amélie Louise of Arenberg
2. Duke Karl Theodor in Bavaria
10. Maximilian I Joseph of Bavaria
5. Princess Ludovika of Bavaria
11. Princess Caroline of Baden
1. Duchess Sophie Adelheid in Bavaria
12. John VI of Portugal
6. Miguel I of Portugal
13. Infanta Carlota Joaquina of Spain
3. Infanta Maria José of Portugal
14. Constantine, Hereditary Prince of Löwenstein
7. Princess Adelaide of Löwenstein
15. Princess Agnes of Hohenlohe-Langenburg

== Bibliography ==
- Adalbert of Bavaria (1980). Die Wittelsbacher: Geschichte einer europäischen Dynastie (in German). Prestel. ISBN 978-3791304762.
- Bestenreiner, Erika (2003). Sisi und ihre Geschwister (in German). Piper. ISBN 978-3492240062.
- Schad, Martha (2002). Elisabeth of Austria: The Mystery, the Myth, the Truth. St. Martin's Press. ISBN 978-0312282202.
- Vickers, Hugo (2000). Alice: Princess Andrew of Greece. Hamish Hamilton. ISBN 978-0241136867.
