= Karl Theodor, Duke in Bavaria =

Duke in Bavaria (1839–1909)

Karl Theodor
- Duke in Bavaria
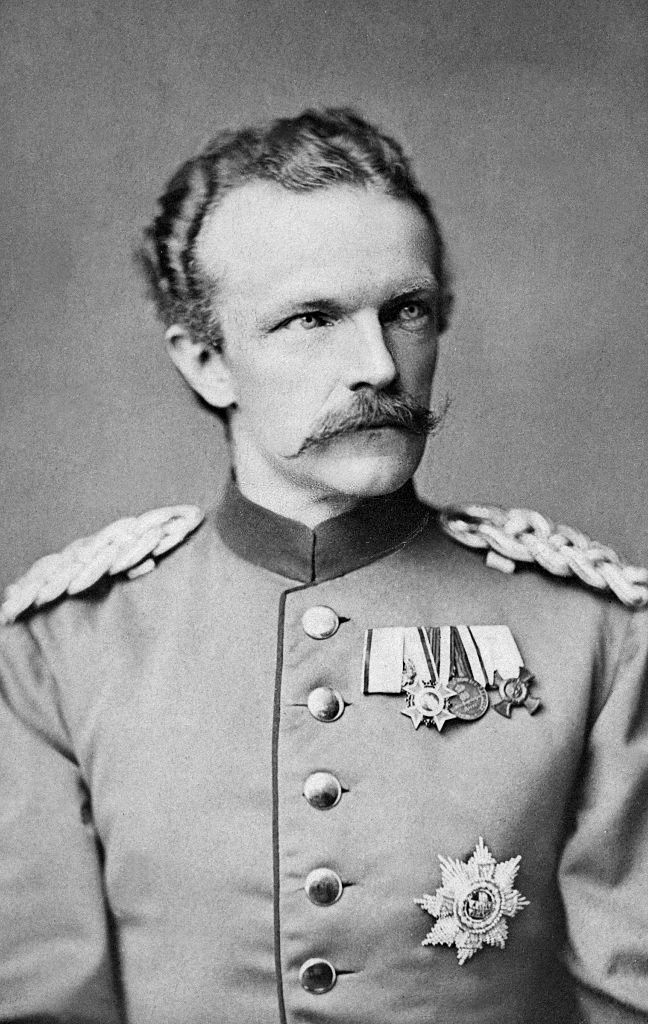
- Karl Theodor c. 1870
- Born: 9 August 1839; Possenhofen Castle, Bavaria
- Died: 30 November 1909 (aged 70); Kreuth, Germany
- Burial: Schloss Tegernsee, Germany
- Spouse: Princess Sophie of Saxony (m. 1865; died 1867) Infanta Maria Josepha of Portugal (m. 1874)
- Issue: Amalie, Duchess of Urach; Sophie, Countess zu Törring-Jettenbach; Elisabeth, Queen of Belgium; Marie Gabrielle, Princess of Bavaria; Duke Ludwig Wilhelm in Bavaria; Duke Franz Joseph in Bavaria
- House: Wittelsbach
- Father: Duke Maximilian Joseph in Bavaria
- Mother: Princess Ludovika of Bavaria

Karl Theodor, Duke in Bavaria (9 August 1839 – 30 November 1909), was a member of the House of Wittelsbach and a professional oculist. He was the favorite brother of Empress Elisabeth of Austria, and the father of Queen Elisabeth of the Belgians.

== Life ==
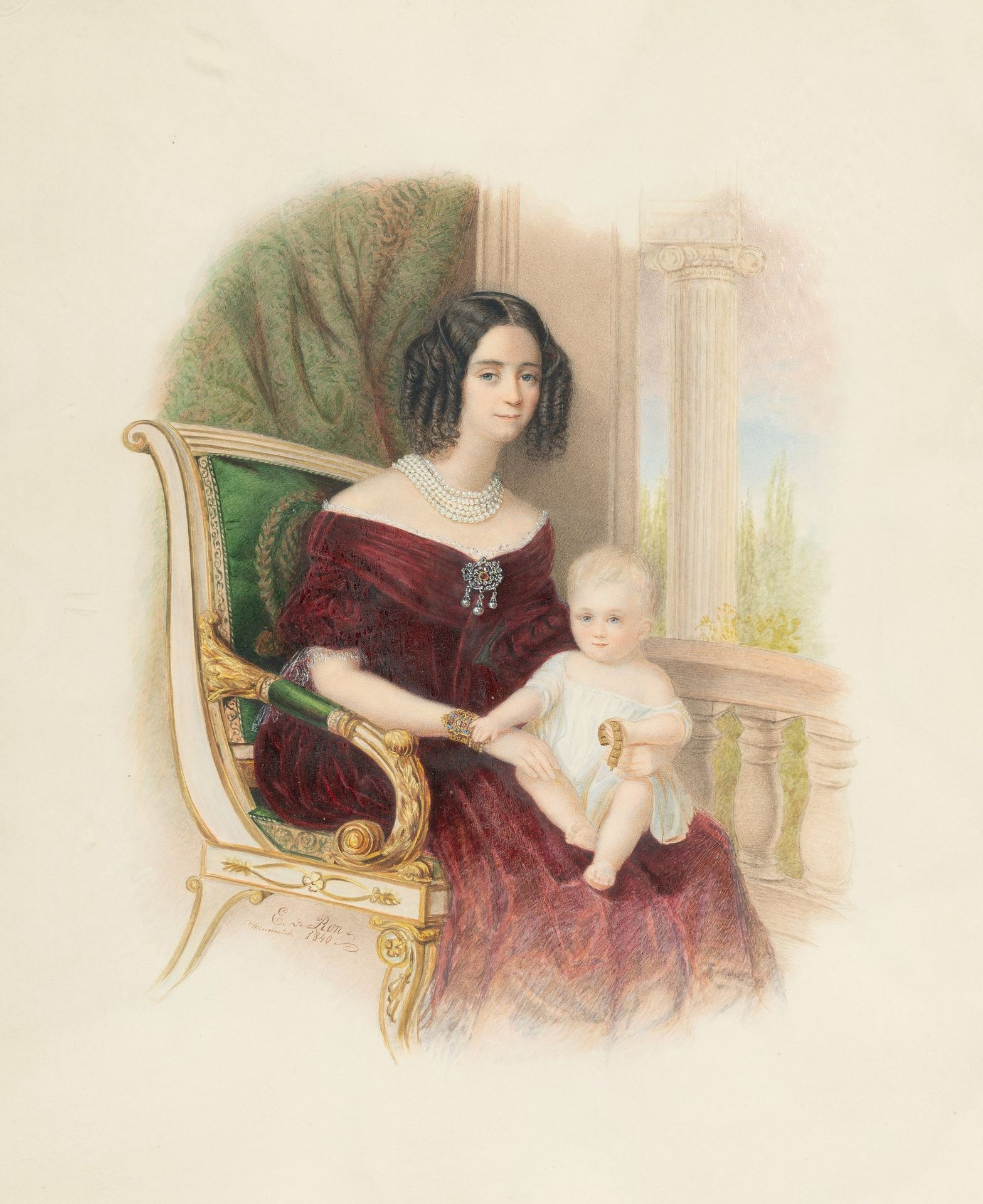
Karl Theodor, Duke of Bavaria, sitting on his mother’s lap, Duchess Ludovika of Bavaria

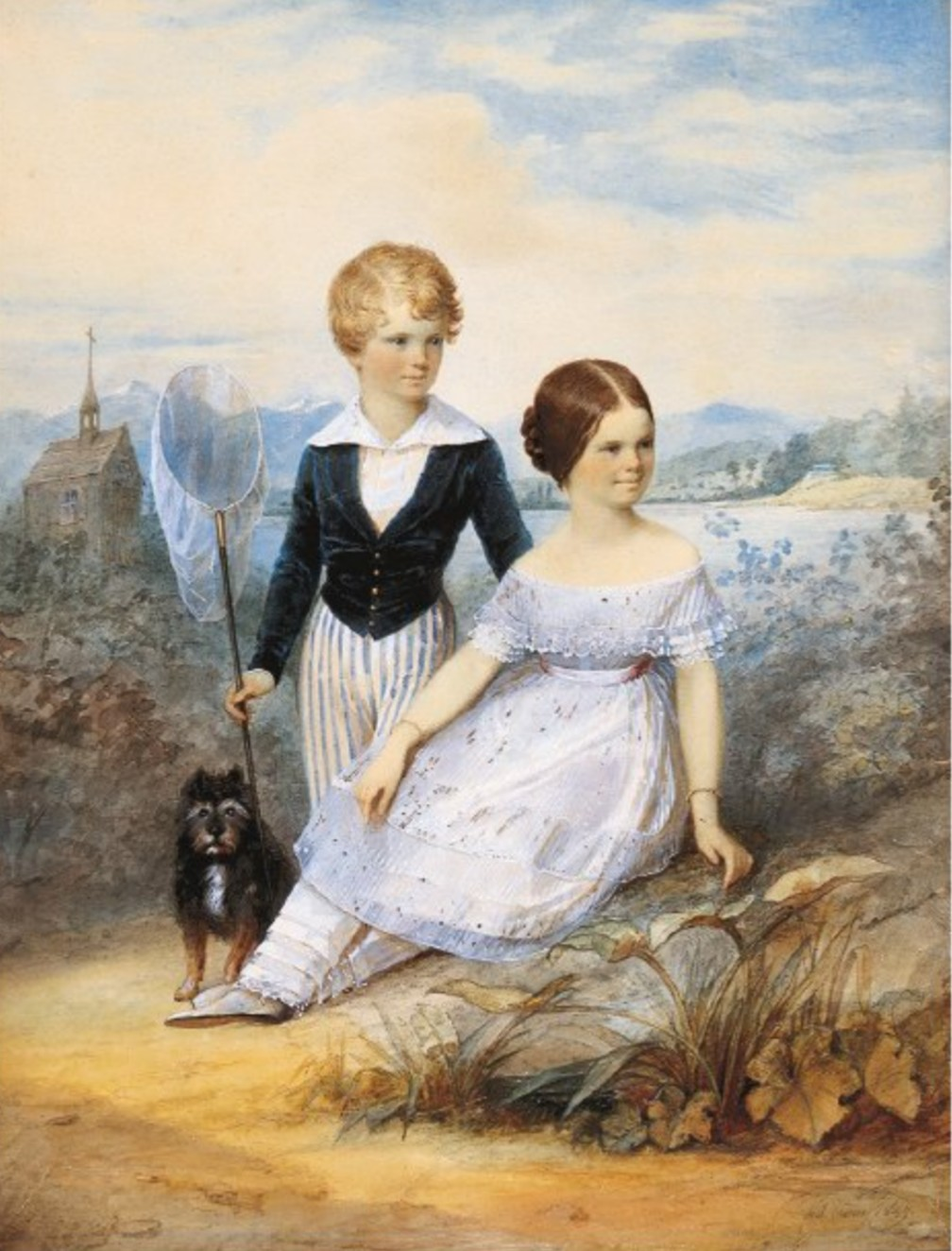
Karl Theodor, Duke in Bavaria, with his sister Elisabeth at 11 years old, and their dog "Bummerl", at Possenhofen Castle

Karl Theodor was born at Possenhofen Castle, the third son of Duke Maximilian in Bavaria and Princess Ludovika of Bavaria.

At the age of 14, Karl Theodor joined the Bavarian Army. In 1866, he fought in the Austro-Prussian War. When he left active duty, he became a student at LMU Munich, where he studied philosophy, law, economics, and medicine. Among his teachers were the chemist Justus von Liebig, the pathologist Ludwig von Buhl, and the physicist Philipp von Jolly.

In 1870, Karl Theodor's studies were interrupted by the Franco-Prussian War in which he served as a proprietary colonel of the 3rd Bavarian Light Horse. After the war, he returned to his studies. In 1872, he was named an honorary Doctor of Medicine by LMU Munich; the following year he completed the requirements for the degree. Then he studied ophthalmology under Professor Deutschland and continued his education under Professor Arlt in Vienna and Professor Horner in Zürich.

In 1877, Karl Theodor began practicing medicine in Menton on the Côte d'Azur, often assisted by his wife Maria Josepha. In 1880, he opened an eye clinic in his castle at Tegernsee. Then in 1895, he founded the Augenklinik Herzog Carl Theodor (English: Duke Charles Theodore Eye Clinic) in Munich; the clinic in the Nymphenburger Strasse remains one of the most respected eye clinics in Bavaria to the present day. Between 1895 and 1909, Karl Theodor personally carried out more than 5,000 cataract operations as well as treating countless other eye disorders.

== Marriages and family ==
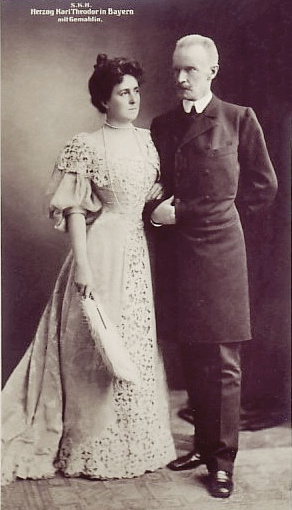
Karl Theodor and his second wife, Infanta Maria Josepha of Portugal, 1890

On 11 February 1865, at Dresden, Karl Theodor married his first cousin Princess Sophie of Saxony, daughter of King John of Saxony and his aunt, Princess Amalie Auguste of Bavaria. They had one child:

- Duchess Amalie in Bavaria (24 December 1865 – 26 May 1912) she married Wilhelm, Duke of Urach, on 4 July 1892, and had issue.

On 29 April 1874, at Kleinheubach, Karl Theodor married Infanta Maria Josepha of Portugal (1857–1943), daughter of the exiled King Miguel I of Portugal and Princess Adelaide of Löwenstein-Wertheim-Rosenberg, and had five children:

- Duchess Sophie Adelheid in Bavaria (22 February 1875 – 4 September 1957), married Hans Veit, Count of Törring-Jettenbach, on 26 July 1898, and had issue.
- Duchess Elisabeth in Bavaria (25 July 1876 – 23 November 1965), married King Albert I of Belgium on 2 October 1900, and had issue.
- Duchess Marie Gabrielle in Bavaria (9 October 1878 – 24 October 1912), married Rupprecht, Crown Prince of Bavaria, on 10 August 1900, and had issue.
- Duke Ludwig Wilhelm in Bavaria (17 January 1884 – 5 November 1968), married Princess Eleonore Anna Lucie of Sayn-Wittgenstein-Berleburg on 19 March 1917.
- Duke Franz Joseph in Bavaria (23 March 1888 – 23 September 1912)

Prince Karl Theodor died from kidney trouble at Bayreuth on 30 November 1909.

== Legacy ==
His cousin, King Ludwig II of Bayern remembered him fondly, writing to Baroness Leonrod in 1863:

I feel I ought to tell you that I've found a true and faithful friend whose only friend I am; it is my cousin Karl, son of Duke Max. He is hated and misunderstood by almost everybody; but I know him better and know that he has a good heart and soul. Oh, it is so beautiful to have a true and beloved friend to whom one can cling in the storms of life and with whom one can share everything!

== Honours ==
Karl Theodor received a number of honours:

- Kingdom of Bavaria:
  - Knight of the Order of St. Hubert
  - Cross of Honour of the Order of Ludwig
- Baden:
  - Knight of the House Order of Fidelity, 1882
  - Knight of the Order of Berthold the First, 1882
- Austrian Empire: Knight of the Order of the Golden Fleece, 1862
- Belgium: Grand Cordon of the Order of Leopold, 1900 – wedding gift
- Brunswick: Grand Cross of the Order of Henry the Lion
- Kingdom of Prussia:
  - Knight of the Order of the Black Eagle, 9 September 1891
  - Grand Commander's Cross of the Royal House Order of Hohenzollern
- Kingdom of Saxony:
  - Knight of the Order of the Rue Crown, 1864
  - Knight of the Military Order of St. Henry, 1870
- Württemberg: Grand Cross of the Order of the Württemberg Crown, 1892
- Grand Duchy of Hesse: Grand Cross of the Ludwig Order, 19 January 1861
- Mecklenburg: Grand Cross of the House Order of the Wendish Crown, with Crown in Ore
- Hohenzollern: Cross of Honour of the Princely House Order of Hohenzollern, 1st Class
- Monaco: Grand Cross of the Order of Saint-Charles, 4 November 1897
- Beylik of Tunis: Grand Cordon of the Order of Glory

He was an honorary doctor of the University of Louvain, honorary colonel of the 5th Regiment of Prussian Dragoons, and an honorary member of the Academy of Medical Sciences in Brussels.

Karl Theodor died at Kreuth in 1909. He is buried in the family crypt in Schloss Tegernsee.

== Ancestry ==
Ancestors of Karl Theodor, Duke in Bavaria

8. Duke Wilhelm in Bavaria
4. Duke Pius August in Bavaria
9. Countess Palatine Maria Anna of Zweibrücken-Birkenfeld
2. Duke Maximilian Joseph in Bavaria
10. Prince Louis of Arenberg
5. Princess Amélie Louise of Arenberg
11. Marie Adélaïde Julie de Mailly-Nesle
1. Duke Karl Theodor in Bavaria
12. Frederick Michael, Count Palatine of Zweibrücken
6. Maximilian I Joseph of Bavaria
13. Countess Palatine Maria Franziska of Sulzbach
3. Princess Ludovika of Bavaria
14. Charles Louis, Hereditary Prince of Baden
7. Princess Caroline of Baden
15. Princess Amalie of Hesse-Darmstadt
