= Karl Theodor =

Karl Theodor may refer to:

- Charles Theodore, Elector of Bavaria (1724–1799), Prince-Elector of Palatine and of Bavaria
- Karl Theodor Anton Maria von Dalberg (1744–1817), Freiherr of Dalberg and Archbishop-Elector of Mainz
- Karl Theodor, Duke in Bavaria (1839–1909)
