= Mount Queen Elizabeth =

Mountain in Alberta and British Columbia, Canada

- Location within Alberta Location within British Columbia Location within Canada

Highest point
- Elevation: 2,850 m (9,350 ft)
- Prominence: 106 m (348 ft)
- Parent peak: Mount King Albert (2987 m)
- Listing: Mountains of Alberta; Mountains of British Columbia
- Coordinates: 50°42′46″N 115°24′21″W

Geography
- Country: Canada
- Provinces: Alberta and British Columbia
- Protected area: Banff National Park
- Parent range: Park Ranges
- Topo map: NTS 82J11 Kananaskis Lakes

Climbing
- First ascent: 1916 Interprovincial Boundary Commission

Mount Queen Elizabeth is located on the border of Alberta and British Columbia, directly east of Mount King Albert. It was named in 1916 by interprovincial boundary surveyors after Queen Elisabeth of Belgium. Note that Elisabeth is the correct spelling of her name.

== See also ==
- List of peaks on the British Columbia–Alberta border
