= Kreuth =

- Municipality
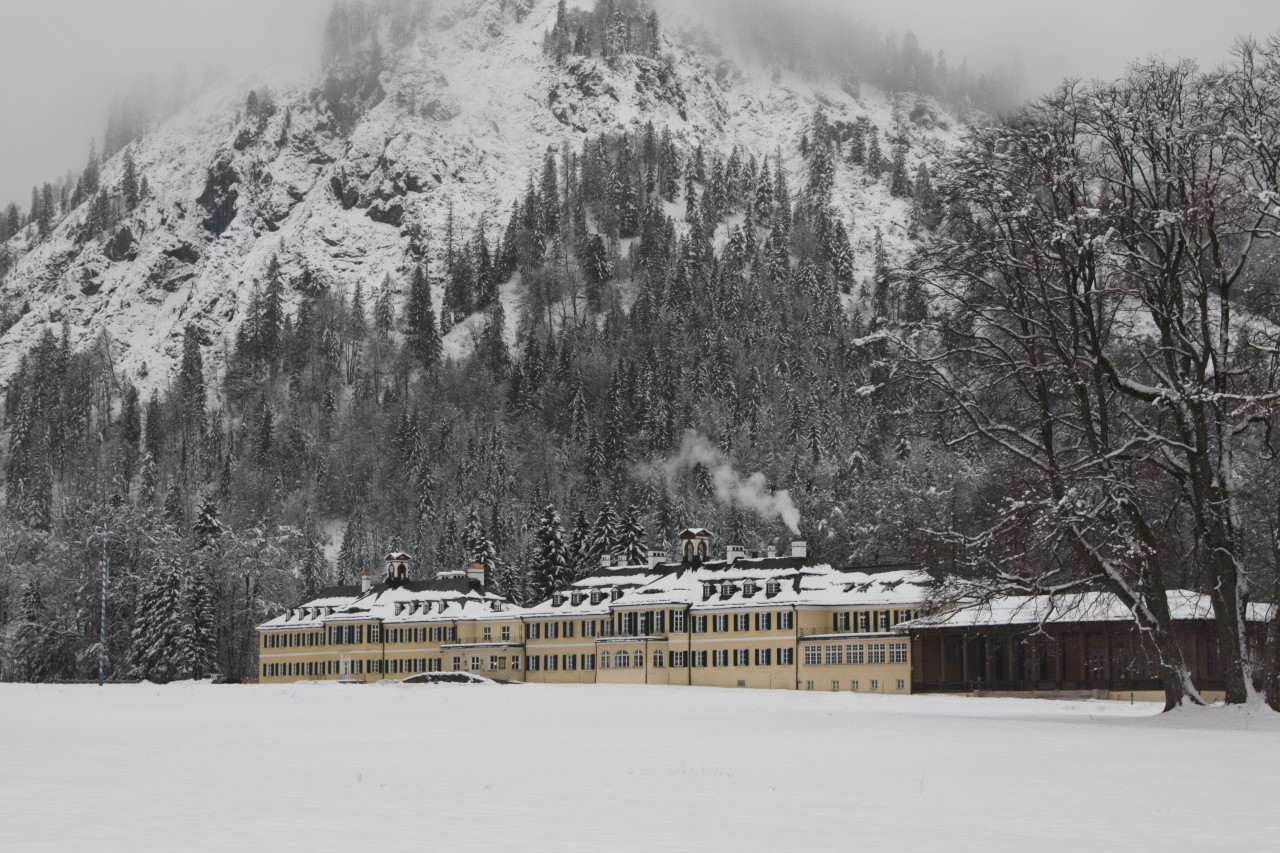
- The bath house ("Wildbad") at Kreuth

- Coat of arms

- Location of Kreuth within Miesbach district
- Interactive map of Kreuth
- Location within Germany Location within Bavaria
- Coordinates: 47°39′N 11°45′E
- Country: Germany
- State: Bavaria
- Admin. region: Oberbayern
- District: Miesbach

Government
  - Mayor (2022–28): Josef Bierschneider (CSU)

Area
  - Total: 122.26 km^{2} (47.20 sq mi)
- Elevation: 787 m (2,582 ft)

Population (2025-12-31)
  - Total: 3,378
  - Density: 27.63/km^{2} (71.56/sq mi)
- Time zone: UTC+01:00 (CET)
  - Summer (DST): UTC+02:00 (CEST)
- Postal codes: 83708
- Dialling codes: 08029
- Vehicle registration: MB
- Website: www.rathaus-kreuth.de

Kreuth (German pronunciation: [kʁɔʏt]) is a municipality and a village in the district of Miesbach in Bavaria in Germany.

== Schloss Ringberg ==
The castle Ringberg is the latest of all the many castles and palaces built by the Bavarian royal family, the House of Wittelsbach, over 800 years. It was only built after the German Revolution of 1918–1919 during the middle and second half of the 20th century by Luitpold Emanuel Ludwig Maria, Duke in Bavaria (1890-1973), and actually never completely finished nor ever lived in. The duke himself donated it to the Max Planck Society in 1973.

== Wildbad Kreuth ==
The springs, sulphurous sources, were first mentioned in 1490. The first bath house was built in 1511 by Abbot Henry V. of Tegernsee. In 1818 the bath came into the possession of King Maximilian I Joseph of Bavaria, together with Tegernsee Abbey, who had new bath houses built that are still used today, named Wildbad Kreuth ("Wild Bath Kreuth" or "Deer Bath Kreuth"), with a reference to the hunting opportunities. Spa guests included Emperors Franz Joseph I of Austria, Nicholas I of Russia and Alexander I of Russia.

In 1957, Duke Ludwig Wilhelm in Bavaria (1884–1968) converted the facilities into a modern sanatorium. The bath is still owned by the Dukes in Bavaria of the House of Wittelsbach. They ran the spa until 1973. Then the buildings were used for political gatherings of the Christian Social Union of Bavaria for some decades. This site is appeared in Russ Meyer's exploitation film Up! as the resident place of Adolf Schwartz. The current owner, Duchess Helene in Bavaria, concluded a leasehold agreement with a hotelier in 2020 who wants to set up a "mental retreat" sanatorium there.
