= Victoria Lindpaintner =

German figure skater

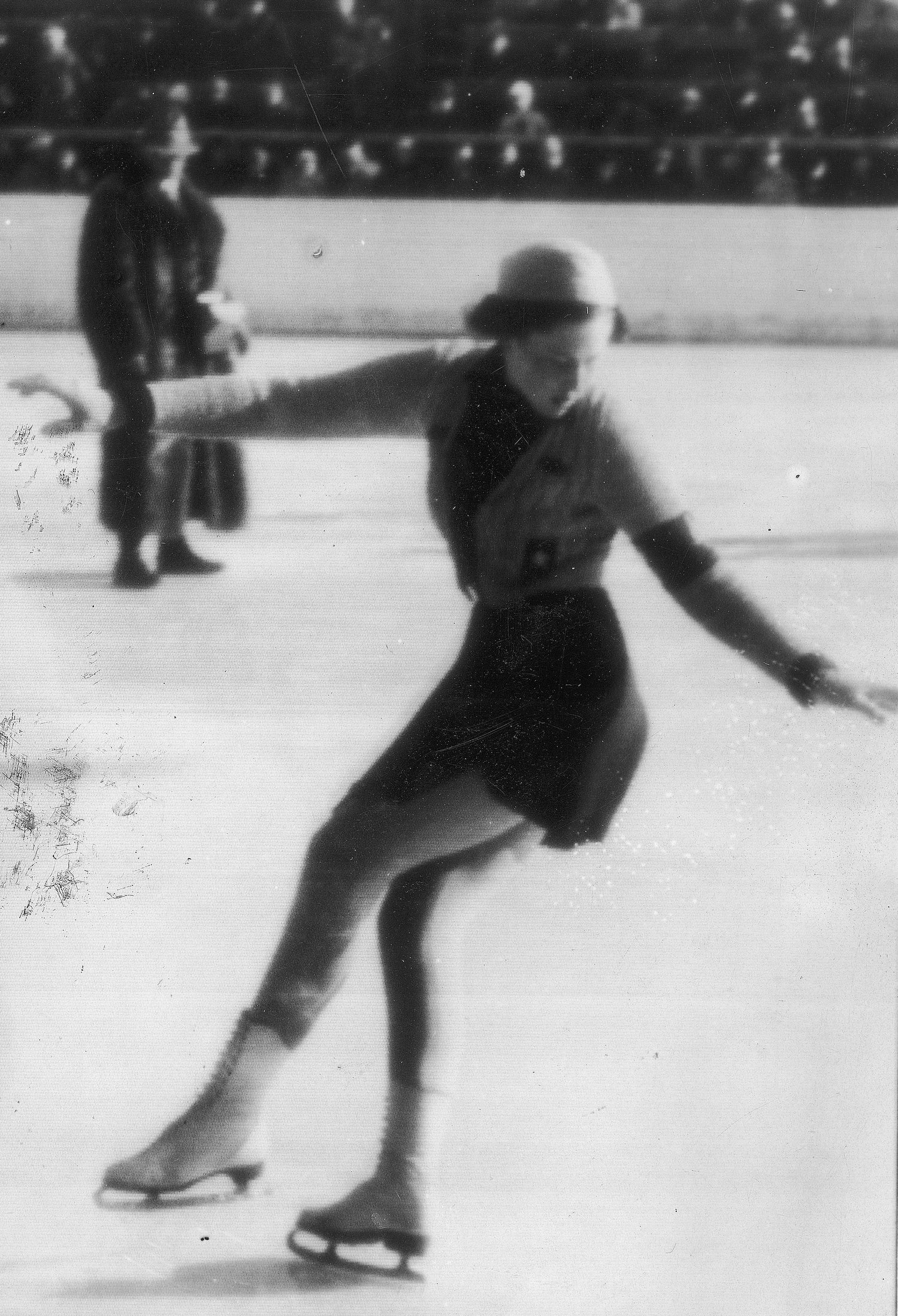
- Lindpaintner at the 1936 Winter Olympics

Personal information
- Born: 19 February 1918 Frankfurt am Main, German Empire
- Died: 29 April 1965 (aged 47) Tegernsee, Bavaria, West Germany

Figure skating career
- Country: Germany
- Skating club: Berliner SC

Victoria Lindpaintner (born 13 February 1918 in Frankfurt am Main; died 29 April 1965 at the Tegernsee, Bavaria) was a German figure skater. She was the 1936 German national champion and represented Germany at the 1936 Winter Olympics, where she placed 8th.

== Biography ==
Lindpaintner represented the club Berliner SC. She married Count Hans Heribert of Törring-Jettenbach (son of Duchess Sophie Adelheid in Bavaria) in October 1938 but the two later divorced and she married Rudolf Hantschel in December 1947.

== Competitive highlights ==
International
Event	1935	1936	1937
Winter Olympics		8th	
World Championships		6th	11th
European Championships	12th	8th	
National
German Championships	3rd	1st	
