= Duke Ludwig Wilhelm in Bavaria (1884–1968) =

Bavarian royal

Duke Ludwig Wilhelm
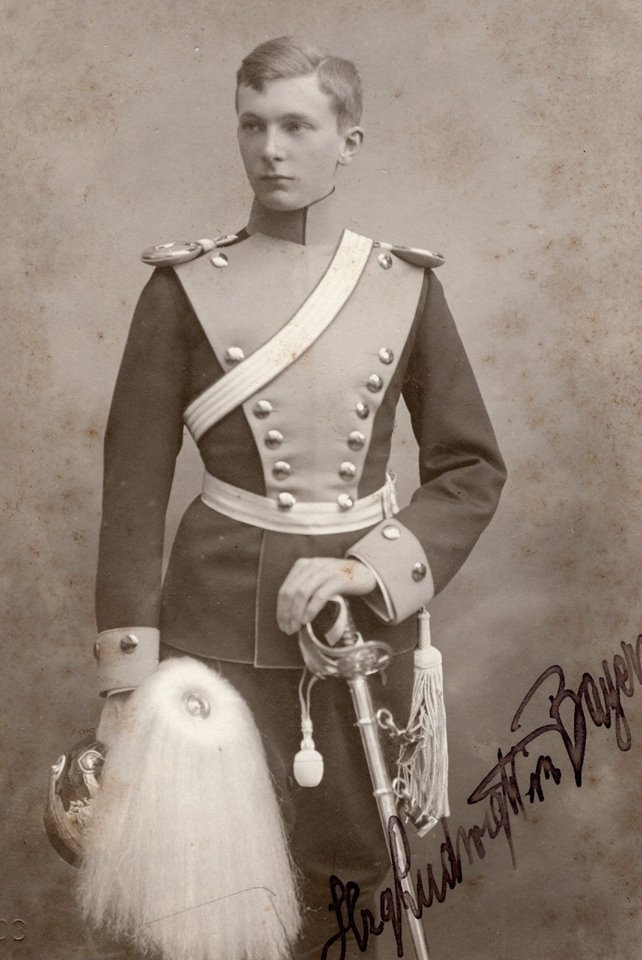
- Ludwig Wilhelm in 1901
- Born: 17 January 1884; Schloss Tegernsee, Bavaria
- Died: 5 November 1968 (aged 84); Wildbad Kreuth, Germany
- Burial: Tegernsee Abbey
- Spouse: Princess Eleonore Anna Lucie of Sayn-Wittgenstein-Berleburg (m. 1917; died 1965)
- House: Wittelsbach
- Father: Karl Theodor, Duke in Bavaria
- Mother: Infanta Maria Josepha of Portugal

Duke Ludwig Wilhelm Karl Norbert Theodor Johann in Bavaria (17 January 1884 – 5 November 1968) was a member of the Kingdom of Bavaria's ruling dynasty, the House of Wittelsbach.

== Life ==
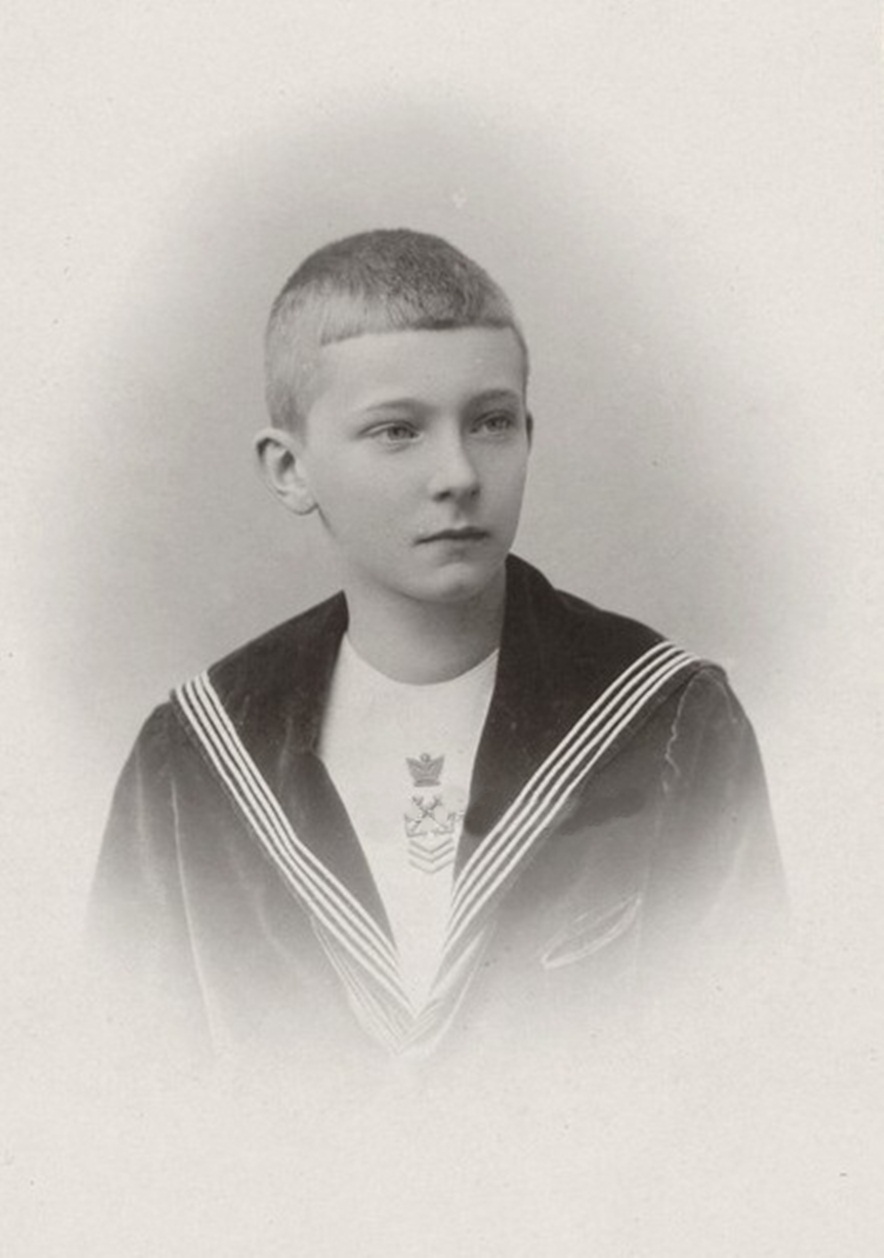
A young Ludwig Wilhelm (1890s)

Ludwig Wilhelm was born at Schloss Tegernsee, the eldest son of Duke Karl Theodor in Bavaria and his second wife Infanta Maria Josepha of Portugal.

By royal command of King Leopold II, he received the Grand Cordon of Leopold as a sister's wedding gift in 1900. However the Prince was only 14 years old and today remains one of the youngest Grand Cordons in Belgian History.

He married Princess Eleonore Anna Lucie zu Sayn-Wittgenstein-Berleburg, widow of Otto Victor Fürst (Prince) von Schönburg (1882 – killed at Rheims, 14 September 1914) and daughter of Prince Franz zu Sayn-Wittgenstein-Berleburg and Countess Julia Cavalcanti d'Albuquerque de Villeneuve, on 19 March 1917 in Kreuth. They had no children.

After the death of his wife on 20 February 1965, he adopted the grandson of his sister Marie Gabrielle, Max Emanuel.

Ludwig Wilhelm died on 5 November 1968 in Wildbad Kreuth, a spa he owned and had converted into a modern sanatorium in 1957.

== Ancestry ==
Ancestors of Duke Ludwig Wilhelm in Bavaria (1884–1968)

8. Duke Pius August in Bavaria
4. Duke Maximilian Joseph in Bavaria
9. Princess Amélie Louise of Arenberg
2. Duke Karl Theodor in Bavaria
10. Maximilian I Joseph of Bavaria
5. Princess Ludovika of Bavaria
11. Princess Caroline of Baden
1. Duke Ludwig Wilhelm in Bavaria
12. John VI of Portugal
6. Miguel I of Portugal
13. Infanta Carlota Joaquina of Spain
3. Infanta Maria José of Portugal
14. Constantine, Hereditary Prince of Löwenstein
7. Princess Adelaide of Löwenstein
15. Princess Agnes of Hohenlohe-Langenburg
