= Mount King Albert =

Mountain in Canada

- Location within Alberta Location within British Columbia Location within Canada

Highest point
- Elevation: 2,987 m (9,800 ft)
- Prominence: 356 m (1,168 ft)
- Parent peak: Mount Back (3008 m)
- Listing: Mountains of Alberta; Mountains of British Columbia
- Coordinates: 50°42′43″N 115°24′54″W

Geography
- Country: Canada
- Provinces: Alberta and British Columbia
- Protected area: Banff National Park; Height of the Rockies Provincial Park
- Parent range: Park Ranges
- Topo map: NTS 82J11 Kananaskis Lakes

Climbing
- First ascent: 1822 G.A. Gambs, K.G. McClelland, T.B. Moffat, H.E. Sampson, D.R. Sharpe, Ernest Feuz.

Mount King Albert is located on the border of Alberta and British Columbia on the Continental Divide at the North end of Height of the Rockies Provincial Park. It was named in 1918 after King Albert.

== See also ==
- List of peaks on the British Columbia–Alberta border
