= Schloss Ringberg =

20th-century castle in Bavaria, Germany

Coordinates: 47°40′45″N 11°44′59″E

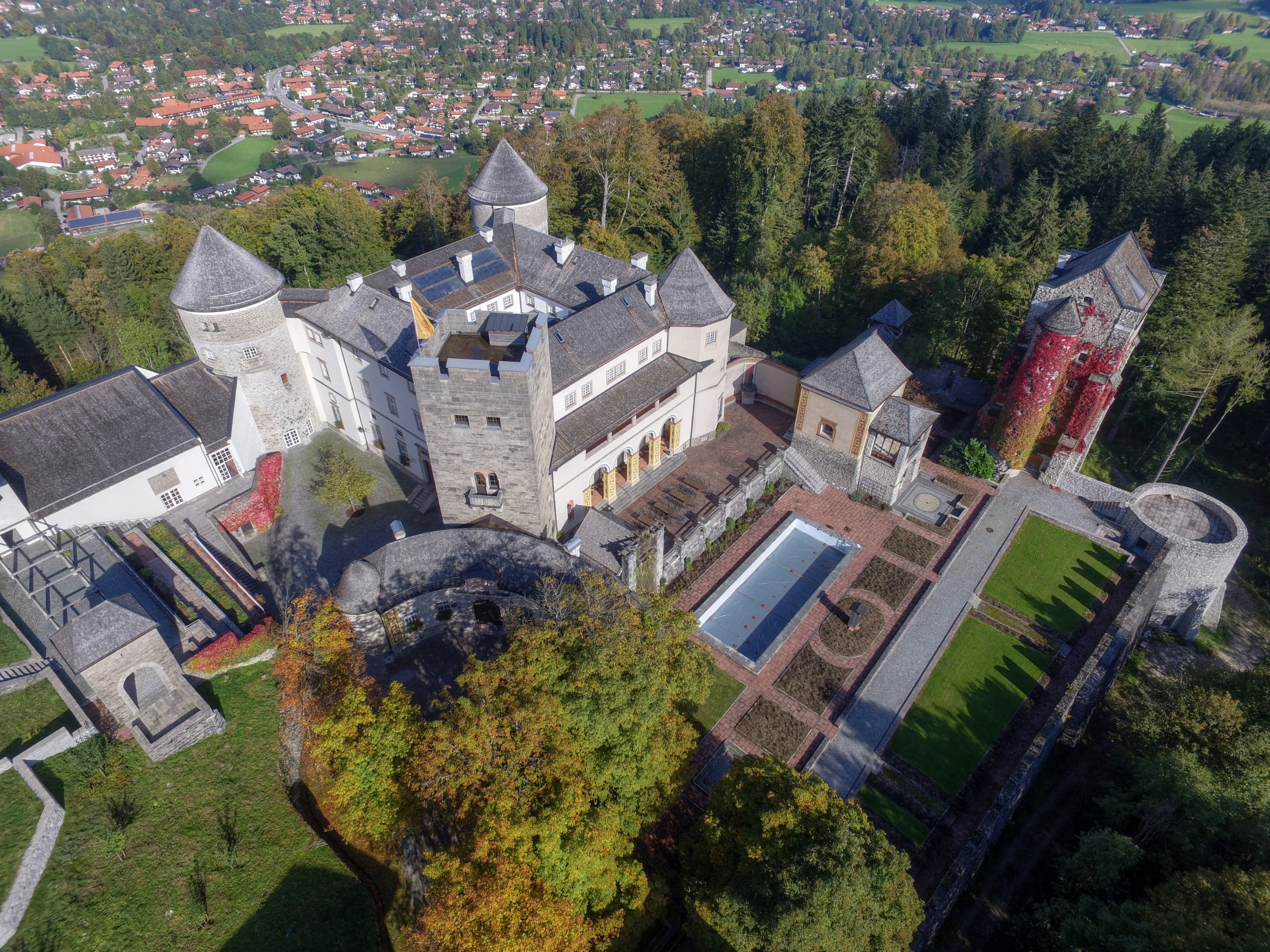
Schloss Ringberg main building

Schloss Ringberg (Ringberg Castle) is located in the Bavarian Alps, 50 km south of Munich, on a foothill overlooking the Tegernsee at an altitude of about 900 meters above sea level. Not open to the general public, it is a property of the Max Planck Society and used for conferences.

== History ==
The castle was the creation of Luitpold Emanuel Ludwig Maria, Duke in Bavaria (1890–1973) and his friend Friedrich Attenhuber (1877–1947), a Munich painter. The Duke was a member of the Wittelsbach family, former rulers of Bavaria.

Like his famous relative, King Ludwig II, the Duke was obsessed with building fantastical structures. Indeed, Ludwig's Schloss Neuschwanstein inspired Schloss Ringberg. The Duke dedicated his life to building the castle.

The two men met at the Ludwig-Maximilians-Universität München, where from 1910 to 1914 the Duke studied philosophy and the history of art. Attenhuber first gave painting lessons to the Duke, then traveled through Europe with him. What may have been a love affair developed into something more, with Attenhuber agreeing to supervise the building of the Duke's dream castle. The result was Schloss Ringberg.

Everything at Ringberg was designed and crafted by Attenhuber himself, from the architecture to the interior decoration, including the paintings.

In 1930, Attenhuber closed his Munich studio, took permanent residence at the castle and changed his painting style (apparently under pressure from the Duke) from Post-Impressionist to a realistic style close to the Blut und Boden style favoured by the Nazis, though it is not clear that the change was driven by political or ideological motives. He found his models in the farmhouses around the Tegernsee. Many of his paintings in this style hang in the ground and first floor rooms of the castle; on the second floor, paintings in his earlier style are on display. They include, however, his last self-portrait, which shows a reversion to his earlier style

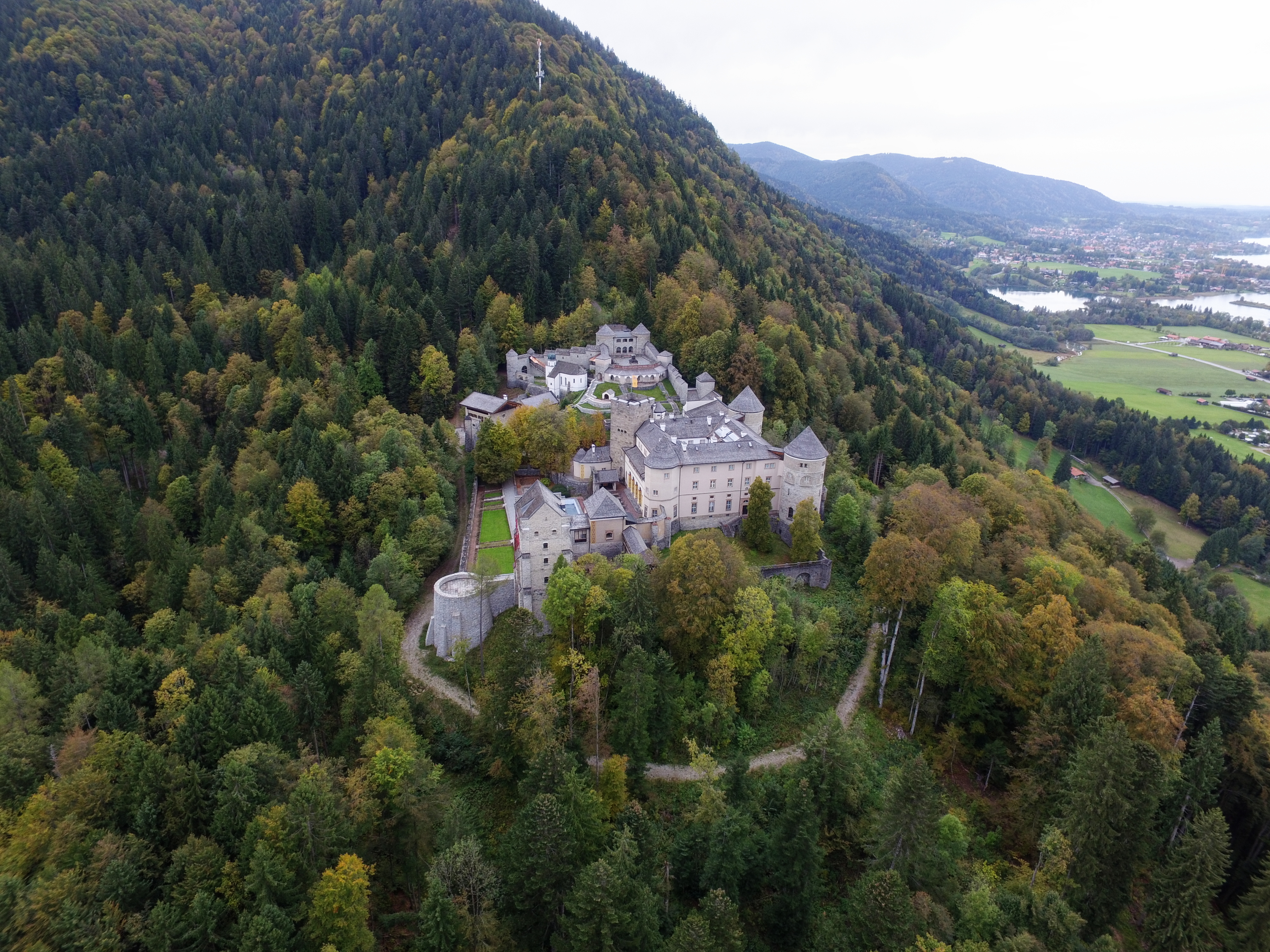
Schloss Ringberg aerial view

In the 1930s, the relationship between the two men deteriorated drastically. Attenhuber was also tied to the castle since he had lost all his social contacts and the Duke did not allow him to leave. In 1947, Attenhuber jumped to his death from the Schloss Ringberg tower.

After his death, Duke Luitpold continued to devote all his energies to the construction of the castle, selling family estates like Possenhofen Castle to pay for the building and travelling the more than 50 kilometres from his home in the Hotel Vier Jahreszeiten in Munich to supervise the progress of the work.

He never actually lived in the castle but preferred to lodge at the Hotel Bachmair when he had to stay overnight. When he died in 1973 at the age of 82, he left Schloss Ringberg unfinished.

In the mid-sixties, the Duke began to consider what should become of Schloss Ringberg after his death, since he had no direct heir. He requested the Bavarian authorities to grant his castle the status of a historical monument as a way of avoiding heavy tax duties, but his application was rejected. He was therefore confronted with the choice of either selling Schloss Ringberg to the Confederation of German Trade Unions or leaving it as gift to the Max Planck Society. He chose the latter. The contract was signed in 1967 and after the Duke's death in 1973 the castle passed into the hands of the Max Planck Society.

== Literature ==
- Helga Himen (with Heiderose Engelhardt): Ringberg Castle on Tegernsee : Swan Song of Wittelsbach Building - Place of Scientific Meetings München / Berlin: Deutscher Kunstverlag, 2008 ISBN 978-3-422-06828-5
