= Infanta Maria Josepha of Portugal =

Duchess Karl Theodor in Bavaria (1857–1943)

Infanta Maria José
- Duchess Karl Theodor in Bavaria
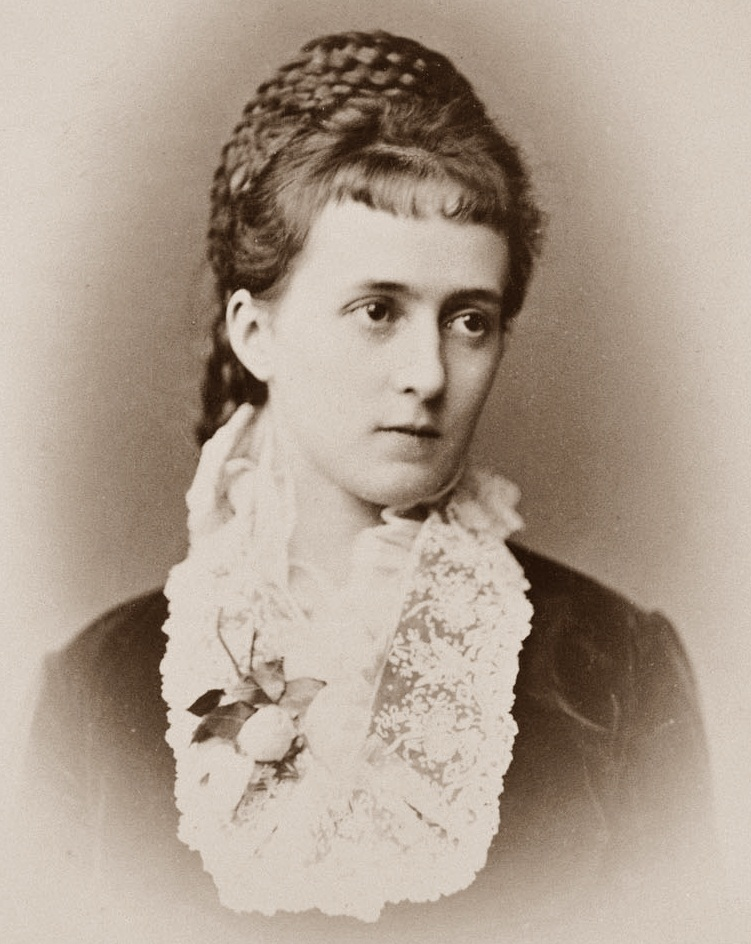
- Maria José c. 1880
- Born: 19 March 1857; Schloss Bronnbach
- Died: 11 March 1943 (aged 85); Vienna, Austria
- Burial: Tegernsee Abbey
- Spouse: Duke Karl Theodor in Bavaria (m. 1874; died 1909)
- Issue: Sophie, Countess zu Törring-Jettenbach; Elisabeth, Queen of the Belgians; Princess Marie Gabrielle of Bavaria; Duke Ludwig Wilhelm in Bavaria; Duke Franz Joseph in Bavaria
Names
- Portuguese: Maria José Joana Eulália Leopoldina Adelaide Isabel Carolina Micaela Rafaela Gabriela Francisca de Assis e de Paula Inês Sofia Joaquina Teresa Benedita Bernardina
- House: Braganza
- Father: Miguel I of Portugal
- Mother: Adelaide of Löwenstein

Infanta Maria José of Portugal (Maria José Joana Eulália Leopoldina Adelaide Isabel Carolina Micaela Rafaela Gabriela Francisca de Assis e de Paula Inês Sofia Joaquina Teresa Benedita Bernardina; 19 March 1857 – 11 March 1943), sometimes known in English as Maria Josepha, was a Portuguese infanta, later Duchess in Bavaria by marriage. She was the maternal grandmother of King Leopold III of Belgium and Queen Marie-José of Italy.

== Life ==
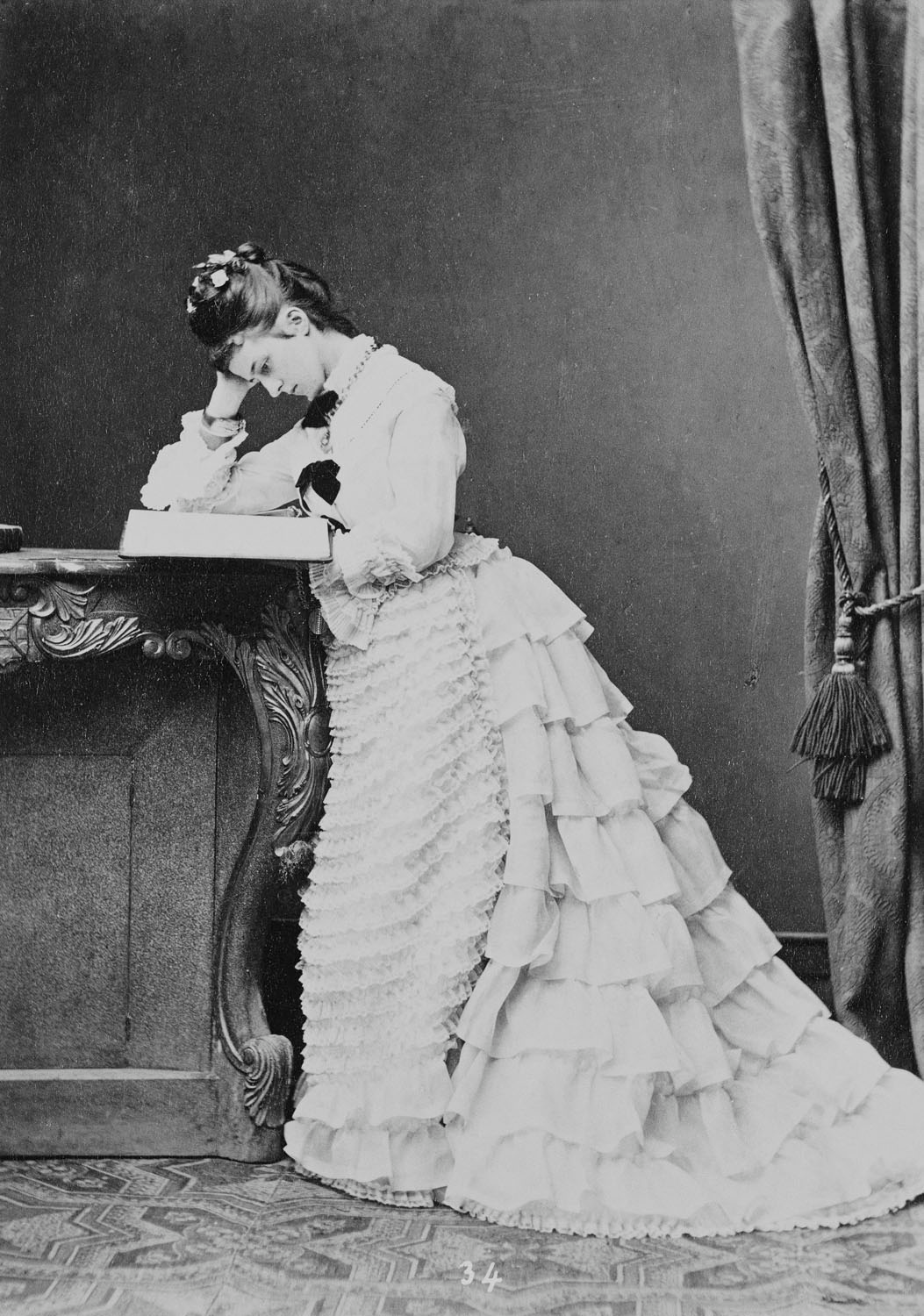
Duchess Maria Josepha in Bavaria, by Joseph Albert, c.1874

Maria José was the fourth child and third daughter of King Miguel I of Portugal and his wife Adelaide of Löwenstein. Among her sisters were Maria Ana, Grand Duchess of Luxemburg and Maria Antónia, Duchess of Parma. Her only brother was Miguel, Duke of Braganza.

On 29 April 1874 she married Duke Karl Theodor in Bavaria, the younger brother of Empress Elisabeth of Austria.

The couple lived in Munich, where they founded the Herzog Carl Theodor Eye Clinic, that still exists today.

Maria José died in Vienna at the age of 85, and is buried in Tegernsee Abbey.

== Children ==
- Sophie Adelheid Ludovika Maria (1875–1957), married Count Hans Veit zu Törring-Jettenbach; their son married Princess Elizabeth of Greece and Denmark.
- Elisabeth Gabriele Valérie Marie (1876–1965), future Queen Elisabeth of Belgium, married Albert I of Belgium.
- Marie Gabrielle (1878–1912), married Rupprecht, Crown Prince of Bavaria.
- Ludwig Wilhelm (1884–1968), married Princess Eleonore zu Sayn-Wittgenstein-Berleburg.
- Franz Joseph (1888–1912).

== Ancestry ==
Ancestors of Infanta Maria Josepha of Portugal

8. Peter III of Portugal
4. John VI of Portugal and Brazil
9. Maria I of Portugal and Brazil
2. Miguel I of Portugal
10. Charles IV of Spain
5. Infanta Carlota Joaquina of Spain
11. Princess Maria Luisa of Parma
1. Infanta Maria José of Portugal
12. Charles Thomas, Prince of Löwenstein
6. Constantine, Hereditary Prince of Löwenstein
13. Countess Sophie of Windisch-Graetz
3. Princess Adelaide of Löwenstein
14. Karl Ludwig, Prince of Hohenlohe-Langenburg
7. Princess Agnes of Hohenlohe-Langenburg
15. Countess Amalie Henriette of Solms-Baruth
