= Duchess Marie Gabrielle in Bavaria =

Bavarian Princess (1878–1912)

- Princess Rupprecht of Bavaria
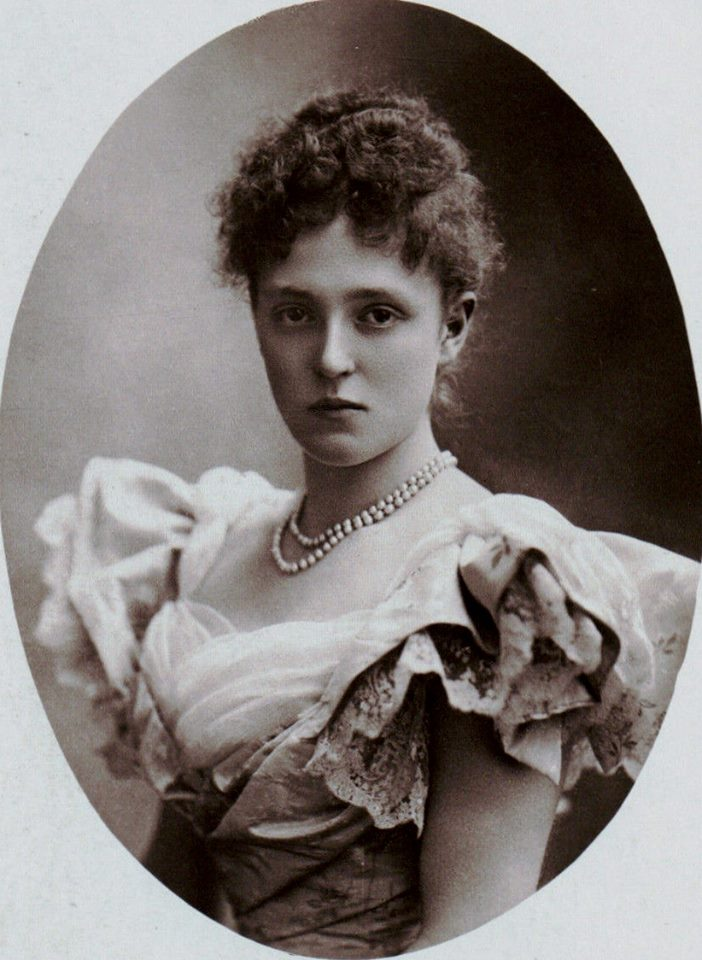
- Marie Gabrielle in 1900
- Born: 9 October 1878; Tegernsee, Kingdom of Bavaria, German Empire
- Died: 24 October 1912 (aged 34); Sorrento, Kingdom of Italy
- Burial: Theatine Church, Munich
- Spouse: Prince Rupprecht of Bavaria (m. 1900)
- Issue: Luitpold, Hereditary Prince of Bavaria; Princess Irmingard; Albrecht, Duke of Bavaria; Prince Rudolf
Names
- German: Marie Gabrielle Mathilde Isabelle Therese Antoinette Sabine Herzogin in Bayern
- House: Wittelsbach
- Father: Duke Karl Theodor in Bavaria
- Mother: Infanta Maria José of Portugal

Marie Gabrielle (German: Marie Gabrielle Mathilde Isabelle Therese Antoinette Sabine Herzogin in Bayern; 9 October 1878 – 24 October 1912) Duchess in Bavaria, was the youngest daughter of Duke Karl Theodor in Bavaria and his second wife, Infanta Maria José of Portugal. She married Prince Rupprecht of Bavaria in 1900 but died before he became Crown Prince. Through her second son Albrecht, Marie Gabrielle was the grandmother of the present Duke of Bavaria, Franz.

== Biography ==
=== Family ===
Her parents were ophthalmologist Karl Theodor, Duke in Bavaria, a member of the House of Wittelsbach and kinsman of the Kings of Bavaria, and his second wife, Infanta Maria José of Portugal, a daughter of King Miguel I, exiled monarch of Portugal. Her paternal aunt was Empress Elisabeth of Austria (Sisi) and one of her sisters was Elisabeth in Bavaria, consort of Albert I of Belgium. Brought up mainly in Possenhofen Castle, she and her siblings had a happy childhood. She had an inclination for drawing, and in this was supported by her father.

According to her cousin and friend Princess Beatrice of Bourbon, Marie Gabrielle was "blonde with a slight reddish tint, has beautiful hair, a very fair, rosy complexion, very delicate features, and skin of such delicacy as I have never seen before—you can see all her veins. She is a bit heavy-set, though still less so than I am. She is very spirited, very lively, and mischievous."

=== Marriage ===
On 10 July 1900 in Munich at the Allerheiligen-Hofkirche, Marie Gabrielle married her second cousin once-removed, Prince Rupprecht of Bavaria. He was the eldest son of Prince Ludwig of Bavaria (later prince regent and King of Bavaria) and Maria Theresia of Austria-Este. The wedding was attended by Prince Joachim of Prussia, representing his father Emperor Wilhelm II. After their marriage, the couple settled down in Bamberg, Bavaria, where Rupprecht was head of an army corps. Their two eldest children were born there.

The couple traveled a great deal. For example, they journeyed to Japan and returned by way of the United States in 1903. The trip to Japan was scientific in nature, and the couple were accompanied by a renowned professor from the Ludwig-Maximilians-Universität München. Marie Gabrielle wrote home quite enthusiastically about their journey. Like her parents, she was a great lover of science and nature, as well as poetry and music.

While in Japan, Marie Gabrielle became seriously ill. Upon their return to Bavaria, she underwent surgery for appendicitis. She made a full recovery.

Her husband Rupprecht became the heir apparent when his father became King of Bavaria in 1913, however, Marie Gabrielle had died from renal failure the previous year and never became Crown Princess of Bavaria. Her husband later remarried, to her first cousin Princess Antoinette of Luxembourg, on April 7, 1921.

Marie Gabrielle was interred at Theatinerkirche in Munich near her deceased children. Her only child to survive to adulthood was her second son Albrecht, who succeeded his father as the head of the House of Wittelsbach in 1955. His daughter was named after her.

=== Issue ===
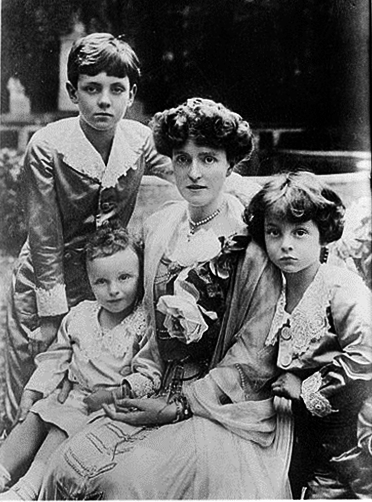
Princess Rupprecht of Bavaria with her three sons, Luitpold, Albrecht, and Rudolf, ca. 1912.

| Name | Birth | Death | Notes |
|---|---|---|---|
By Rupprecht Maria Luitpold Ferdinand, Crown Prince of Bavaria (May 18, 1869–August 2, 1955; married on July 10, 1900 at the Court Church in The Residenz, Munich)
| Luitpold Maximilian Ludwig Karl of Bavaria | May 8, 1901 | August 27, 1914 | died in childhood from polio. |
| Irmingard Maria Therese José Cäcilia Adelheid Michaela Antonia Adelgunde | September 21, 1902 | April 21, 1903 | died in childhood from diphtheria. |
| Albrecht Luitpold Ferdinand Michael | May 3, 1905 | July 8, 1996 | married first, 1930, Countess Maria Draskovich von Traskotjan; married second 1971, Countess Marie-Jenke von Buzin; had issue. |
| Daughter | December 6, 1906 | December 6, 1906 | stillborn. |
| Rudolf Friedrich Rupprecht | May 30, 1909 | June 26, 1912 | died in childhood from diabetes. |

== Ancestry ==
Ancestors of Duchess Marie Gabrielle in Bavaria

8. Duke Pius August in Bavaria
4. Duke Maximilian Joseph in Bavaria
9. Princess Amélie Louise of Arenberg
2. Duke Karl Theodor in Bavaria
10. Maximilian I Joseph of Bavaria
5. Princess Ludovika of Bavaria
11. Princess Caroline of Baden
1. Duchess Marie Gabrielle in Bavaria
12. John VI of Portugal
6. Miguel I of Portugal
13. Infanta Carlota Joaquina of Spain
3. Infanta Maria José of Portugal
14. Constantine, Hereditary Prince of Löwenstein
7. Princess Adelaide of Löwenstein
15. Princess Agnes of Hohenlohe-Langenburg
