= Elisabeth of Bavaria, Queen of the Belgians =

Queen of the Belgians from 1909 to 1934

Elisabeth of Bavaria
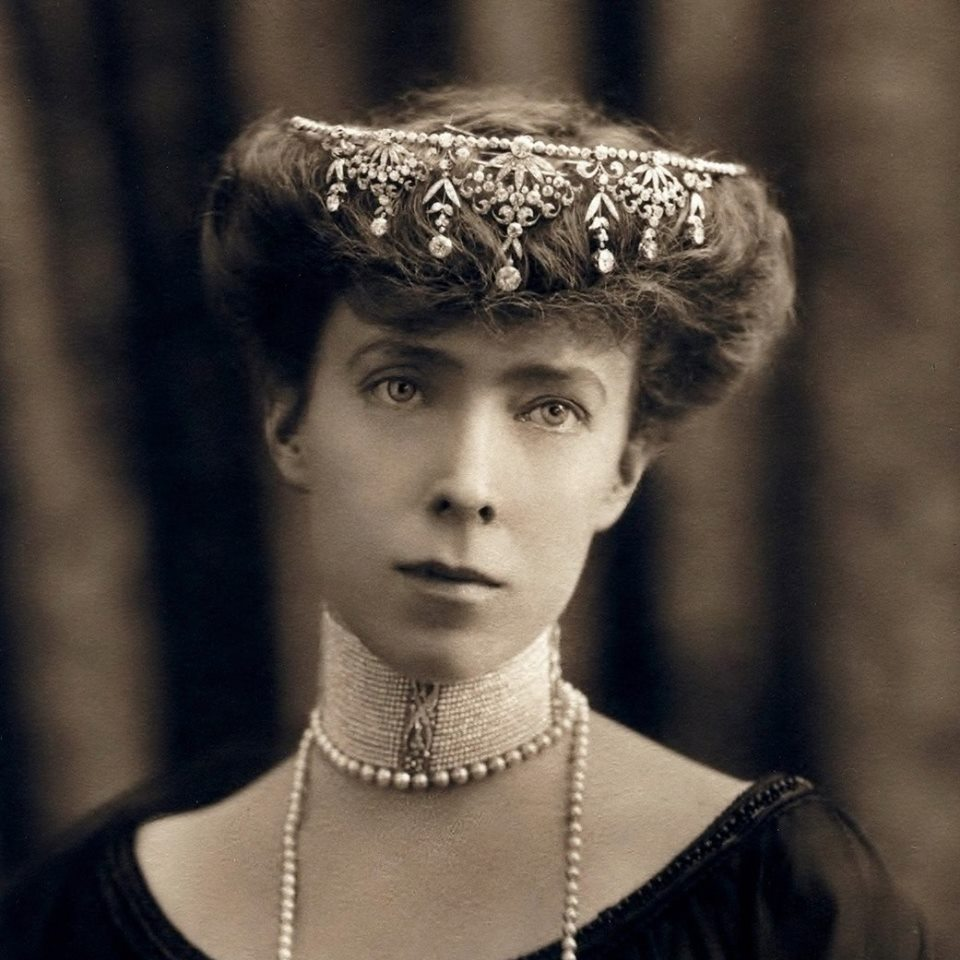
- Elisabeth in 1910

Queen consort of the Belgians
- Tenure: 23 December 1909 – 17 February 1934
- Born: Duchess Elisabeth in Bavaria; 25 July 1876; Possenhofen Castle, Germany
- Died: 23 November 1965 (aged 89); Brussels, Belgium
- Burial: Church of Our Lady of Laeken
- Spouse: Albert I of Belgium (m. 1900; died 1934)
- Issue: Leopold III of Belgium; Prince Charles, Count of Flanders; Marie-José, Queen of Italy
Names
- Elisabeth Gabriele Valérie Marie
- House: Wittelsbach
- Father: Duke Karl Theodor in Bavaria
- Mother: Infanta Maria José of Portugal

Elisabeth of Bavaria (Elisabeth Gabriele Valérie Marie; 25 July 1876 – 23 November 1965) was Queen of the Belgians from 23 December 1909 to 17 February 1934 as the wife of King Albert I, and a duchess in Bavaria by birth. She was the mother of King Leopold III of Belgium and of Queen Marie-José of Italy.

== Family ==
She was born in Possenhofen Castle. Her father was Duke Karl Theodor in Bavaria, head of a cadet branch of the Bavarian royal family, and an ophthalmologist. She was named after her paternal aunt, Empress Elisabeth of Austria, better known as Sisi. Her mother was Infanta Maria José of Portugal, daughter of exiled Miguel I of Portugal. Charlotte, Grand Duchess of Luxembourg, Empress Zita, the last Empress of Austria and Queen of Hungary, and Prince Felix of Bourbon-Parma, husband of Grand Duchess Charlotte and brother of Empress Zita, were among Elisabeth's first cousins.

An artist himself, Duke Karl-Theodor cultivated the artistic tastes of his family and Elisabeth was raised with a deep love for painting, music and sculpture. At her father's clinic, where her mother assisted him as a nurse, Elisabeth obtained exposure to productive labor and to human suffering, unusual for a princess of that time.

== Married life and reign ==
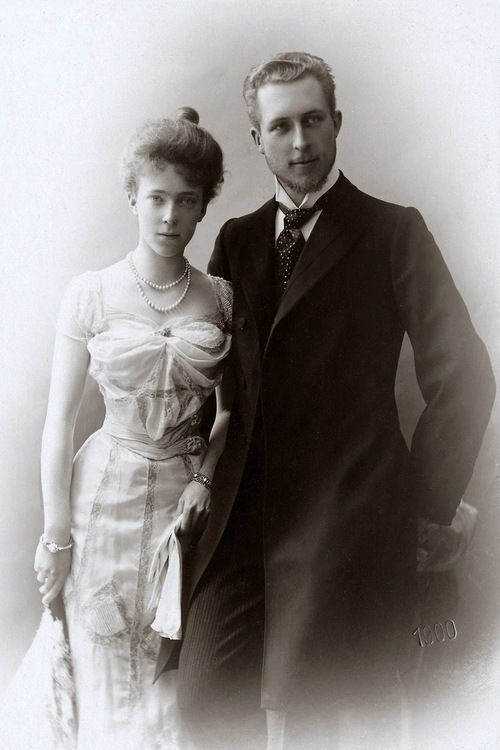
Engagement photo of Elisabeth and Albert

In Munich on 2 October 1900, Duchess Elisabeth married Prince Albert I, second-in-line to the throne of Belgium (after his father Prince Philippe, Count of Flanders). Upon her husband's accession to the Belgian throne in 1909, Elisabeth became queen. The Congolese city of Élisabethville (since 1966 named Lubumbashi) was named in her honor.

They first met in 1897 at the funeral of Elisabeth's aunt Duchess Sophie Charlotte in Bavaria, who was also the mother-in-law of Albert's sister Henriette. Albert had been born the second son of Prince Philippe, Count of Flanders and Princess Marie of Hohenzollern-Sigmaringen, and at birth was third in line of succession to the throne of his paternal uncle, King Leopold II of the Belgians, behind Albert's father and elder brother, Prince Baudouin. Baudouin's unexpected death in January 1891 immediately raised Albert to prominence within Belgium, and by the time he met Elisabeth he was the only living male member of his generation and (save the remote possibility of his uncle becoming widowed, remarrying, and fathering a legitimate child) was guaranteed the Crown of the Belgians upon Leopold's death.

Albert had two sisters who survived into adulthood: Princess Henriette who married Prince Emmanuel of Orléans, and Princess Joséphine Caroline who married her cousin, Prince Karl-Anton of Hohenzollern-Sigmaringen, brother of King Ferdinand I of Romania.

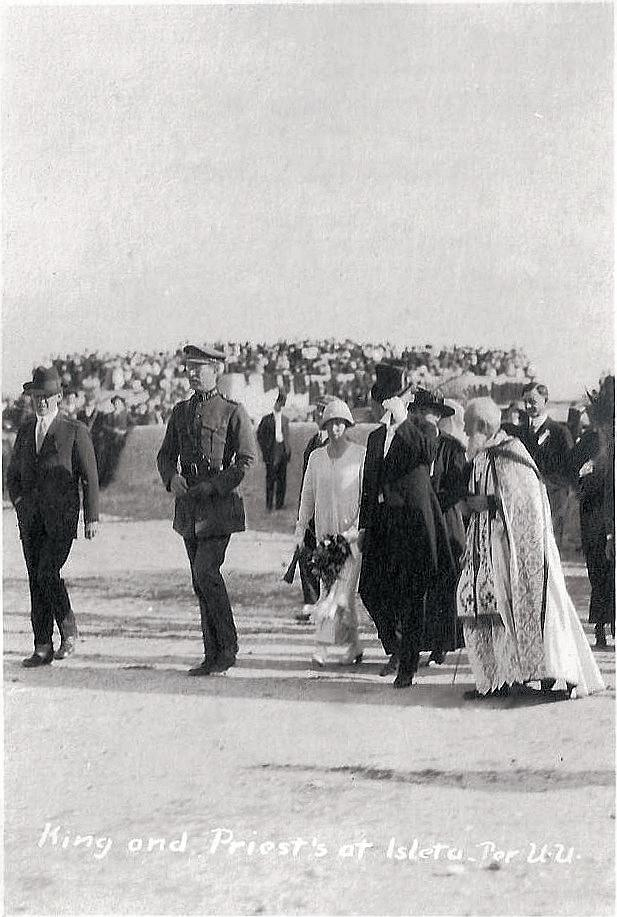
The Queen (in a white dress) and the King during their visit to Isleta pueblo, New Mexico, in 1919 with Anton Docher

In December 1909, Albert and Elisabeth became King and Queen of the Belgians, following the death of Albert's uncle, King Leopold II. The new Queen took on a much more public role than her predecessors, getting involved with many charities and organizations, particularly those in the arts and social welfare. She often surrounded herself with famous authors and artists, as well as leading scientists of the day. Her true care and concern for others and her friendly nature quickly endeared her to the people of Belgium (see Belgium in World War I).

When World War I began in August 1914 Queen Elisabeth worked with the nurses on the front and helped establish the Symphony Orchestra of the field army. By the end of 1914, she gave Belgian King's Messenger Archibald A. Gordon alias Major Gordon the task to participate in the establishment of the Hospital L'Océan (fr) in De Panne. The Queen traveled frequently to the United Kingdom, under the pretext of visiting her children who were studying there. She was often bringing important messages and information to the British government from her husband and his forces. After the end of the war, the royal couple and their sons Leopold and Karl made their triumphant entry into Brussels on November 22, 1918. Elisabeth, riding on a large white horse, appeared overwhelmed.

During the First World War, she and the King resided in De Panne. She made herself beloved by visiting the front lines and by sponsoring a nursing unit. Despite her German background, she was a popular queen, perceived as eagerly supporting her adoptive country.

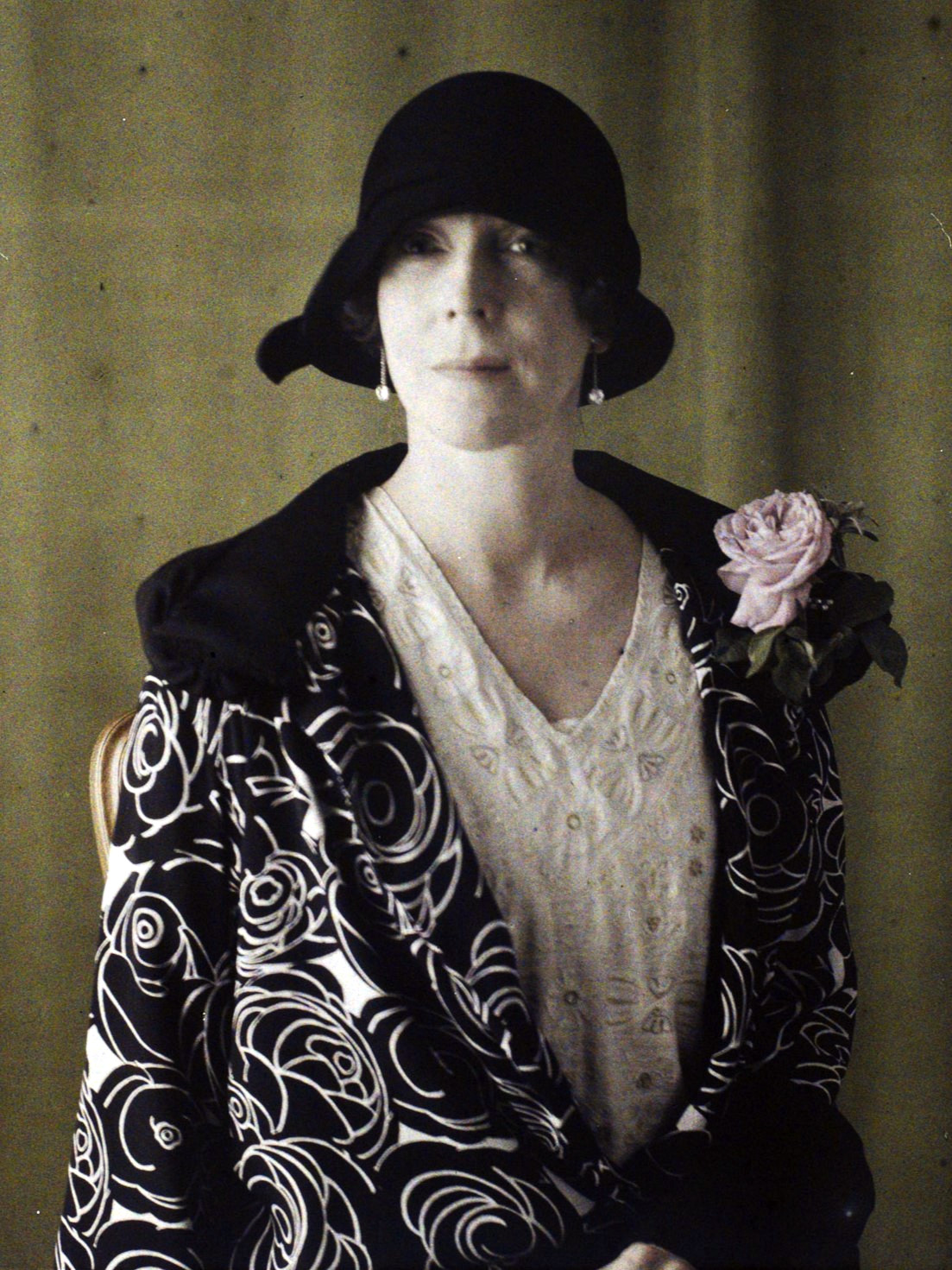
Autochrome portrait by Georges Chevalier, 1924

From 23 September to 13 November 1919, the Queen, together with the King and Prince Leopold, undertook an official visit to the United States of America. During a journey in the historic pueblo of Isleta in New Mexico, the King awarded the Order of Leopold to Father Anton Docher. As a memento, the King was given a turquoise cross mounted in silver made by the Tiwa people. Ten thousand people traveled to Isleta for the occasion.

== Later years ==
On 17 February 1934, Albert I died in a mountain climbing accident in the Ardennes of Belgium, near Namur. He was succeeded by their elder son, King Leopold III. Elisabeth withdrew from public life, so as not to hinder the efforts of her daughter-in-law, now Queen Astrid. However, in August 1935, Queen Astrid was killed in a car crash in Küssnacht am Rigi, Switzerland. Queen Elisabeth returned to public life, doing her best to support her son and his family, and resuming her position as first lady of the land.

Elisabeth lived to see her son become king (but also go into exile and abdicate), her younger son become, effectively, regent of the realm, and her grandson mount the throne.

As queen dowager, she became a patron of the arts and was known for her friendship with such notable scientists as Albert Einstein.

During the German occupation of Belgium from 1940 to 1944, she used her influence as queen and her German connections to assist in the rescue of hundreds of Jewish children from deportation by the Nazis. When Brussels was liberated, she allowed her palace to be used for the headquarters of the British XXX Corps, and presented its commander General Horrocks with its mascot, a young wild boar named 'Chewing Gum'. After the war she was awarded the title Righteous Among the Nations by the Israeli government.

During the 1950s, the Queen evoked controversy abroad by visiting the Soviet Union, China and Poland, trips that prompted some to label her as the "Red Queen". She became the first royal to pay a royal visit to Israel in 1959.

== Death ==
Queen Elisabeth died in Brussels at the age of 89 on 23 November 1965 from a heart attack. She is interred in the royal vault at the Church of Our Lady of Laeken, Brussels. She was the 1,016th Dame of the Royal Order of Queen Maria Luisa.

== Legacy ==
The city of Lubumbashi in Congo (Kinshasa) was formerly known as "Élisabethville", and it was named in her honor when it was founded in 1910 in what was then the Belgian Congo. It adopted its current name in 1966 when, after six years of wrangling following independence, Joseph-Désiré Mobutu ordered Belgian place names in Congo changed.

The Queen Elisabeth Competition, a longstanding international competition for career-starting classical musicians regularly held in Brussels, is named after her.

Belgian Egyptologist Jean Capart created the Fondation Égyptologique Reine Élisabeth in honor of her visit to Tutankhamun's tomb on 18 February 1923. The association is now called Association Égyptologique Reine Élisabeth.

== Children ==
- King Leopold III of Belgium, born 3 November 1901, and died at Woluwe-Saint-Lambert on 25 September 1983.
- Prince Charles, Count of Flanders, born Brussels 10 October 1903, and died at Ostend on 1 June 1983.
- Marie-José, Queen of Italy, born Ostend 4 August 1906, and died in Thonex, Switzerland, on 27 January 2001.

== Honours ==
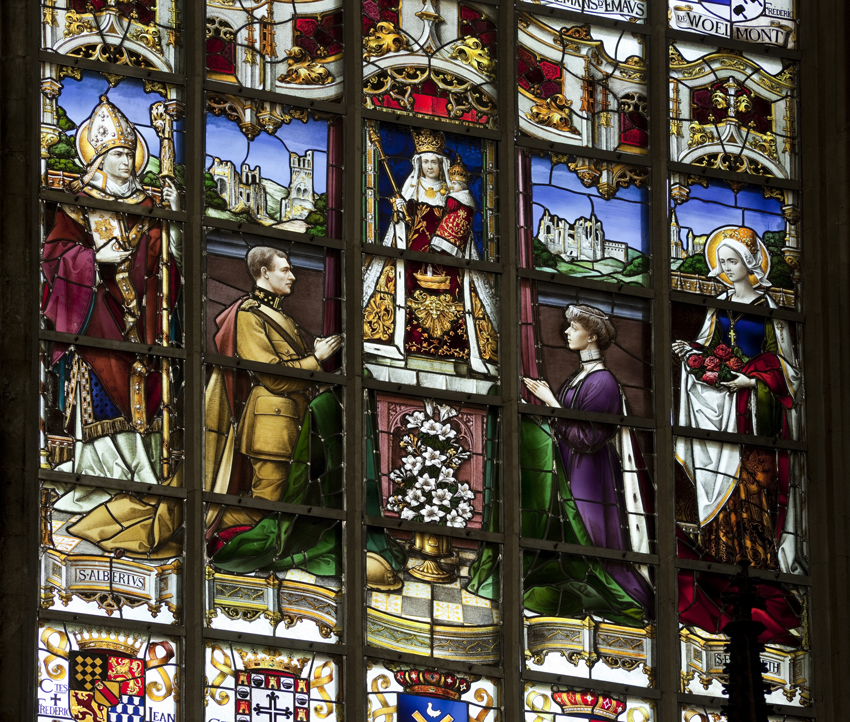
Queen Elisabeth, wearing ermine in prayer for our Lady of the Sablon

=== National ===
- (Kingdom of Bavaria) Bavarian Royal Family: Dame of the Royal Order of Saint Elizabeth, 1st Class
- Belgium: Knight Grand Cross of the Order of Leopold I

=== Foreign ===
- (Austrian Empire) Austrian Imperial and Royal Family: Dame Grand Cross of the Imperial Austrian Order of Elisabeth, 1910
- France: Grand Cross of the Order of the Legion of Honour, 14 November 1918
- Empire of Japan: Dame Grand Cordon of the Order of the Precious Crown
- Luxembourg: Dame of the Order of the Gold Lion of the House of Nassau
- Netherlands:
  - Dame Grand Cross of the Order of the Lion of the Netherlands
  - Queen Juliana Inauguration Medal
- Poland:
  - Grand Cross of the Order of the White Eagle
  - Cross of Valour Medal, 1922
- (Spain) Spanish Royal Family: Dame of the Order of Queen Maria Luisa, 24 June 1910
- United Kingdom: Member of the Decoration of the Royal Red Cross
- Holy See: Dame of the Decoration of Honour

Awards

- (International Committee of the Red Cross) International Red Cross and Red Crescent: Recipient of the Florence Nightingale Medal
- Yad Vashem Righteous Among the Nations

=== Arms ===
Alliance Coat of Arms of King Albert I
and Queen Elisabeth

Royal Monogram of Queen Elisabeth
of Belgium

== See also ==
- History of Belgium
- Queen Elisabeth Competition
- Queen Elisabeth Medical Foundation
- Mount Queen Elizabeth

Elisabeth in Bavaria House of Wittelsbach Born: 25 July 1876 Died: 23 November 1965
Belgian royalty
Vacant Title last held by Marie Henriette of Austria	Queen consort of the Belgians; 1909–1934	Succeeded by Astrid of Sweden
