= Possenhofen Castle =

Condominium complex and former palace in Bavaria, Germany

Coordinates: 47.95875°N 11.313056°E

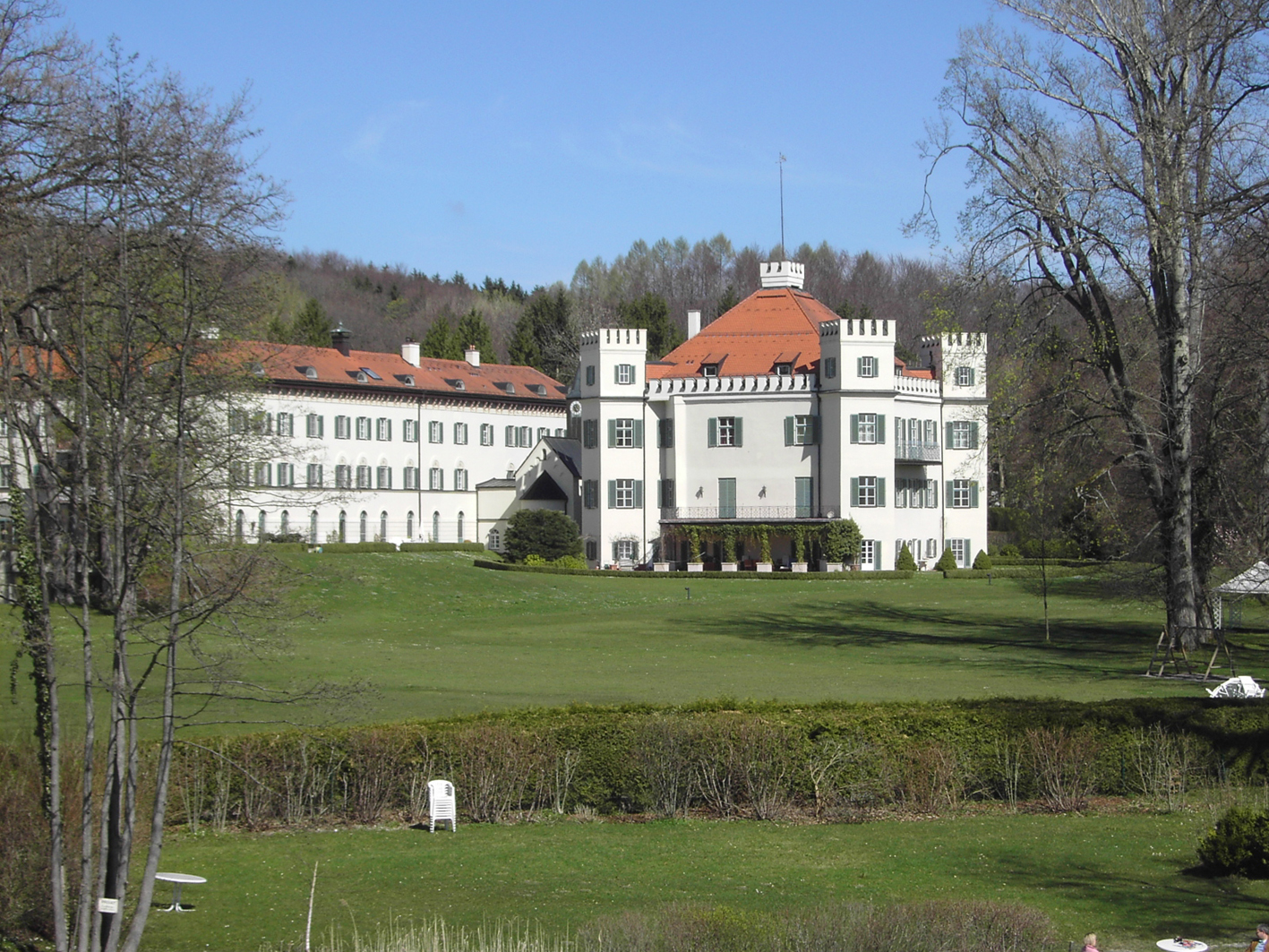
- Interactive map of the Possenhofen Castle area

General information
- Location: Karl-Theodor-Straße 14C; 82343 Pöcking, Germany
- Opened: 1536

Possenhofen Castle (German: Schloss Possenhofen) is a condominium complex and former palace located in Possenhofen on the western shore of Lake Starnberg in Bavaria, Germany. It is best known as being the childhood summer residence of Empress Elisabeth of Austria.

== History ==
Possenhofen Castle was built in 1536 by Jakob Rosenbusch. It was destroyed during the Thirty Years' War, then rebuilt. The palace passed through various owners before being bought in 1834 by Maximilian, Duke in Bavaria, father of Duchess Elisabeth in Bavaria, later the Empress of Austria. Possenhofen was used as the family's summer residence, with their winters spent at Herzog-Max-Palais in Munich.

The palace served as a seat of the Dukes in Bavaria, a junior branch of the House of Wittelsbach, until it became derelict after 1920. Duke Luitpold Emanuel sold Possenhofen, as well as Biederstein Castle in Munich-Schwabing, in order to build his late romantic Schloss Ringberg. Possenhofen subsequently served various functions—children's home, hospital, even a motorcycle repair shop—until being restored and converted to condominiums in the 1980s. It is not open to the public.
