= Princess Augusta of Bavaria =

Duchess of Leuchtenberg (1788–1851)

- Princess of Venice; Grand Duchess of Frankfurt; Duchess of Leuchtenberg
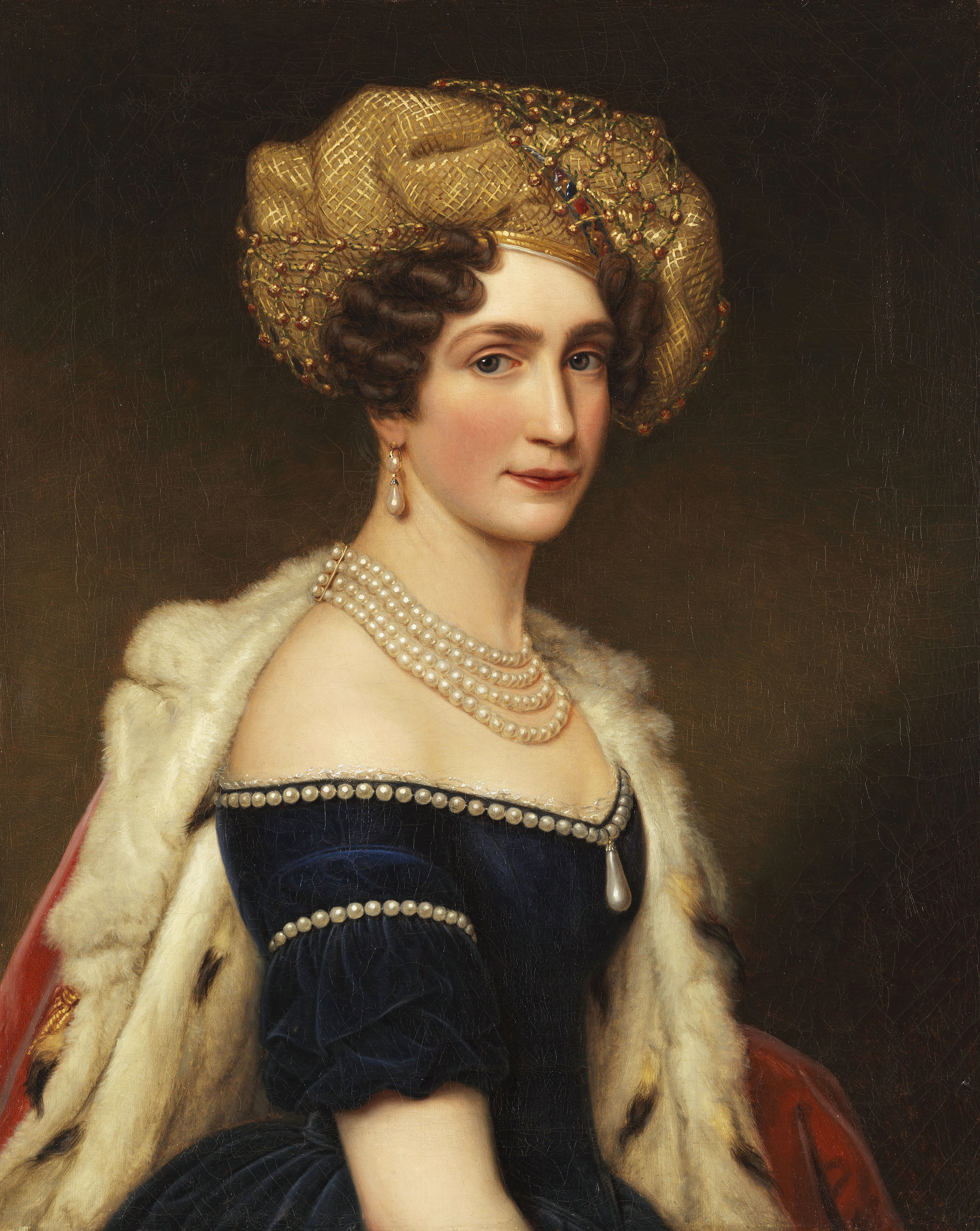
- Portrait by Joseph Karl Stieler, c. 1825

Viceregal consort of Italy
- Tenure: 14 January 1806 – 11 April 1814

Duchess consort of Leuchtenburg Princess consort of Eichstätt
- Tenure: 14 November 1817 – 21 February 1824
- Born: 21 June 1788; Strasbourg, Kingdom of France
- Died: 13 May 1851 (aged 62); Munich, Kingdom of Bavaria
- Spouse: Eugène de Beauharnais (m. 1806; died 1824)
- Issue: Joséphine, Queen of Sweden and Norway; Eugénie, Princess of Hohenzollern-Hechingen; Auguste, Prince Consort of Portugal; Amélie, Empress of Brazil; Théodolinde, Countess of Württemberg; Princess Carolina; Maximilian, 3rd Duke of Leuchtenberg
Names
- German: Augusta Amalia Ludovika Georgia; French: Auguste Amélie Louise Georgine
- House: Wittelsbach
- Father: Maximilian I Joseph of Bavaria
- Mother: Augusta Wilhelmina of Hesse-Darmstadt

Coat of arms of Auguste Amélie de Bavière

Princess Augusta of Bavaria, Duchess of Leuchtenberg (German: Augusta Amalia Ludovika Georgia von Bayern) (21 June 1788 in Munich – 13 May 1851 in Strasbourg) was the second child and eldest daughter of Maximilian I Joseph of Bavaria and Princess Augusta Wilhelmine of Hesse-Darmstadt. By marriage, she was a French princess and vicereine of Italy. She was the aunt of Empress Elisabeth of Austria and, by marriage, of Emperor Napoleon III.

== Early life ==
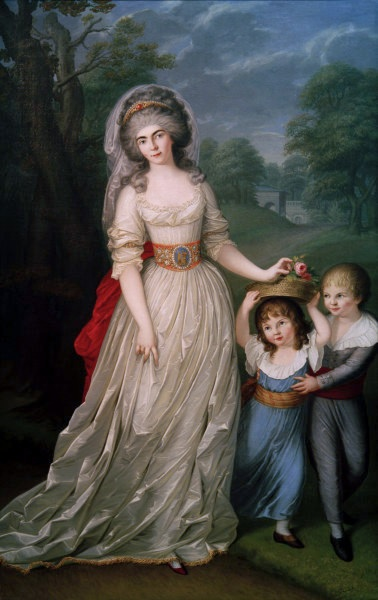
Princess Augusta with her brother and mother, 1791

Augusta Amalia of Bavaria was the eldest daughter of Maximilian I Joseph of Bavaria and Princess Augusta Wilhelmina of Hesse-Darmstadt. In 1795, upon the death of her uncle, her father Maximilian became the reigning duke of Zweibrücken, but the troops of the young French First Republic occupied his States. Augusta lost her mother to tuberculosis in 1796; a year later, her father married the young Caroline of Baden, who imposed a seriousness on her husband's court that some considered beneficial. At first, Augusta did not like her stepmother, unlike her younger siblings Karl Theodore and Charlotte, as she was still attached to her late mother; however, Augusta and Caroline's relationship improved over time. In 1799, upon the death of his distant cousin Charles Theodore, Maximilian became count-elector, Palatine of the Rhine and Duke-Elector of Bavaria as Maximilian III.

== Marriage and issue ==
Although promised in marriage to the heir of Baden, Charles, the engagement was broken at the behest of Napoleon I of France. He was trying to ally himself with German princes and organized a double marriage: between Augusta and Eugène de Beauharnais, the only son of Josephine de Beauharnais and Alexandre, vicomte de Beauharnais, and stepson of Napoleon, and between Charles of Baden and Stéphanie de Beauharnais, Eugène's cousin, who the emperor had adopted and raised with the dignity of an imperial princess. In return, Napoleon raised Bavaria from a state to a Kingdom. The marriage of Augusta of Bavaria and Eugene took place between 13 and 14 January 1806. Napoleon attended the wedding. The couple left for Milan the next day, because Eugene had been named viceroy of Italy by his stepfather. Although a diplomatic marriage, this union would turn out to be a happy one.

In 1814, the French Empire fell. Eugene, Augusta, and their children took refuge with the King of Bavaria. In 1817, Augusta's father named his son-in-law Duke of Leuchtenberg and Prince of Eichstädt, with the style Royal Highness. Eugène died young in 1824.

A Catholic, Bavarian princess, the Dowager Duchess of Leuchtenberg opposed in vain the marriage of her younger son, Maximilian, to Maria Nikolaevna of Russia, the eldest daughter of Tsar Nicholas I of Russia. The Grand Duchess was Orthodox and the marriage was unequal, with Maximilian not being of royal blood. At the Tsar's demand, the young couple lived in St. Petersburg.

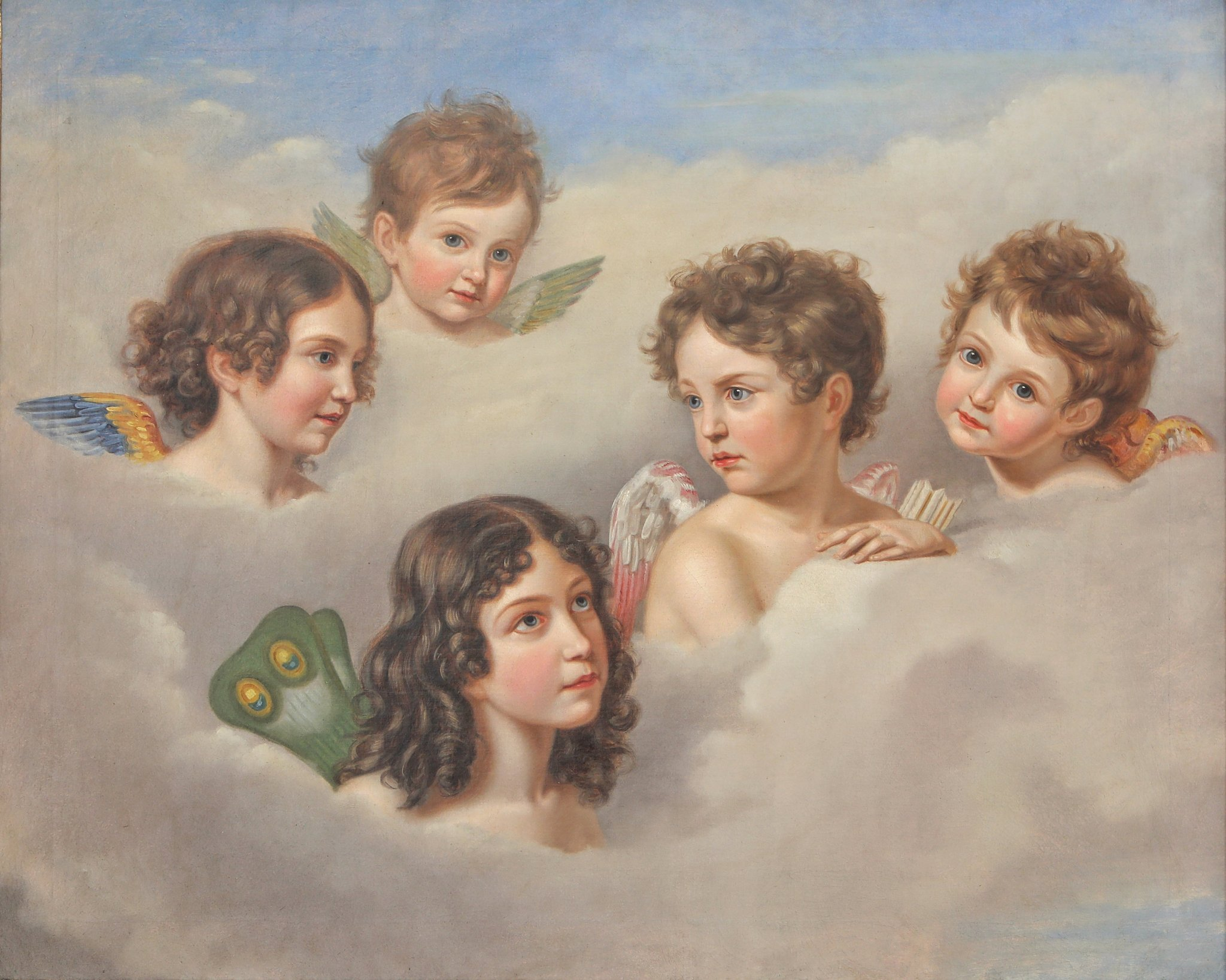
The children of the Duke and Duchess of Leuchtenberg: Josephine, Eugenie, August, Amalie, Theodelinde. by Joseph Karl Stieler.

Augusta and Eugène had seven children:

- Princess Joséphine Maximiliane Eugénie Napoléonne de Beauharnais (14 March 1807 – 7 June 1876); married Oscar I of Sweden, himself the son of Napoleon's old love, Désirée Clary.
- Princess Eugénie Hortense Auguste de Beauharnais (22 December 1808 – 1 September 1847); married Friedrich, Prince of Hohenzollern-Hechingen.
- Prince Auguste Charles Eugène Napoléon de Beauharnais, 2nd Duke of Leuchtenberg (9 December 1810 – 28 March 1835); married Maria II of Portugal. There was no issue from this marriage.
- Princess Amélie Auguste Eugénie Napoléone de Beauharnais (31 July 1812 – 26 January 1873); married Pedro I of Brazil (father of Maria II of Portugal and Pedro II of Brazil) and became Empress of Brazil.
- Princess Theodelinde Louise Eugénie Auguste Napoléone de Beauharnais (13 April 1814 – 1 April 1857); married Wilhelm, 1st Duke of Urach.
- Princess Carolina Clotilde de Beauharnais (15 January 1816 – 25 January 1816)
- Prince Maximilian Josèphe Eugène Auguste Napoléon de Beauharnais (2 October 1817 – 1 November 1852); married Grand Duchess Maria Nikolaievna of Russia, eldest daughter of Nicholas I of Russia and received the title of "Prince Romanovsky" with the style "Imperial Highness" in 1852.

== Death ==
Augusta had outlived her husband and three of her children by the time she died in 1851 at the age of 62 in Munich. At that time, France's president was her nephew Louis-Napoléon Bonaparte, the son of Hortense de Beauharnais, Queen of Holland, the sister of Prince Eugène.

== Gallery ==
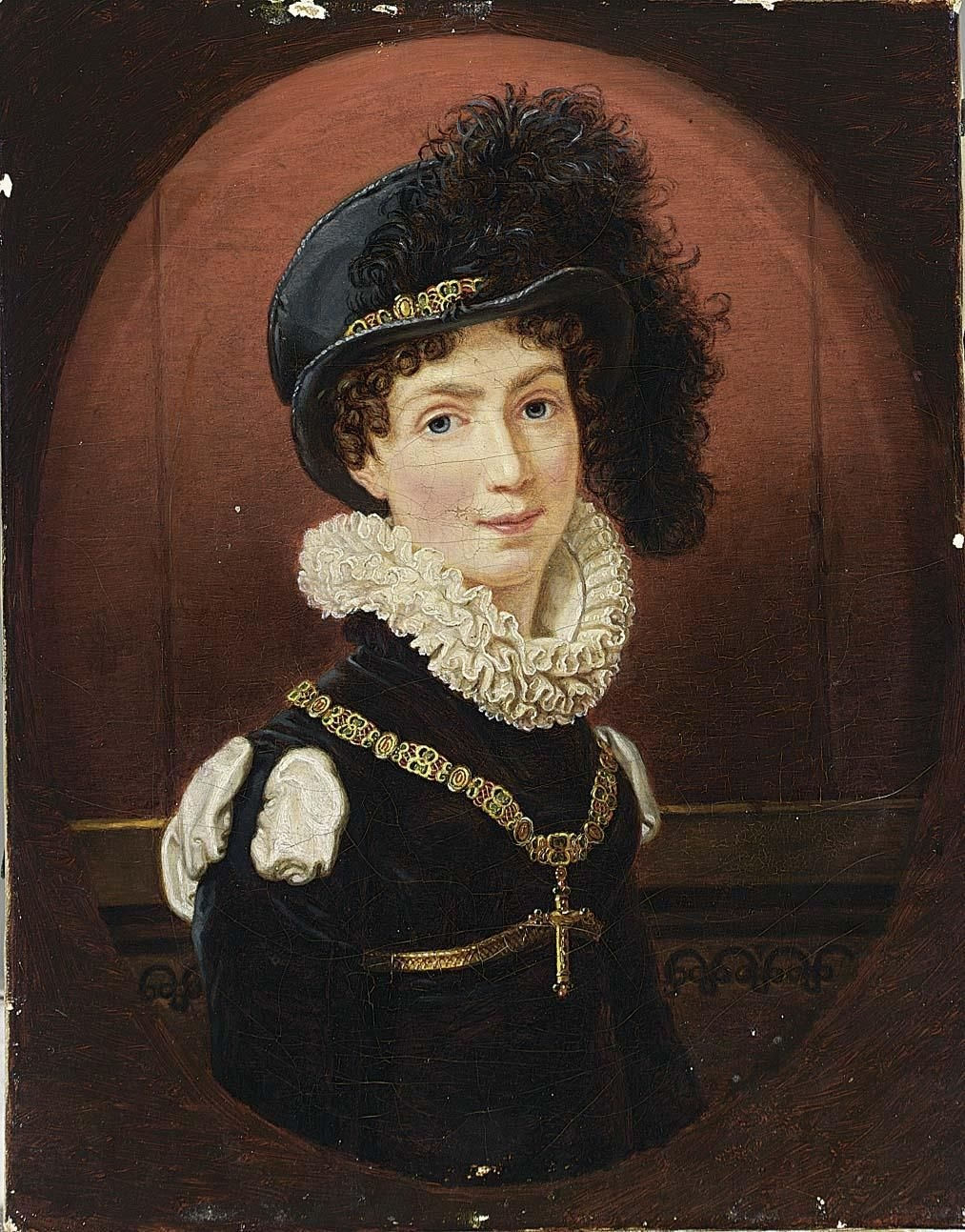
A young Princess Augusta.

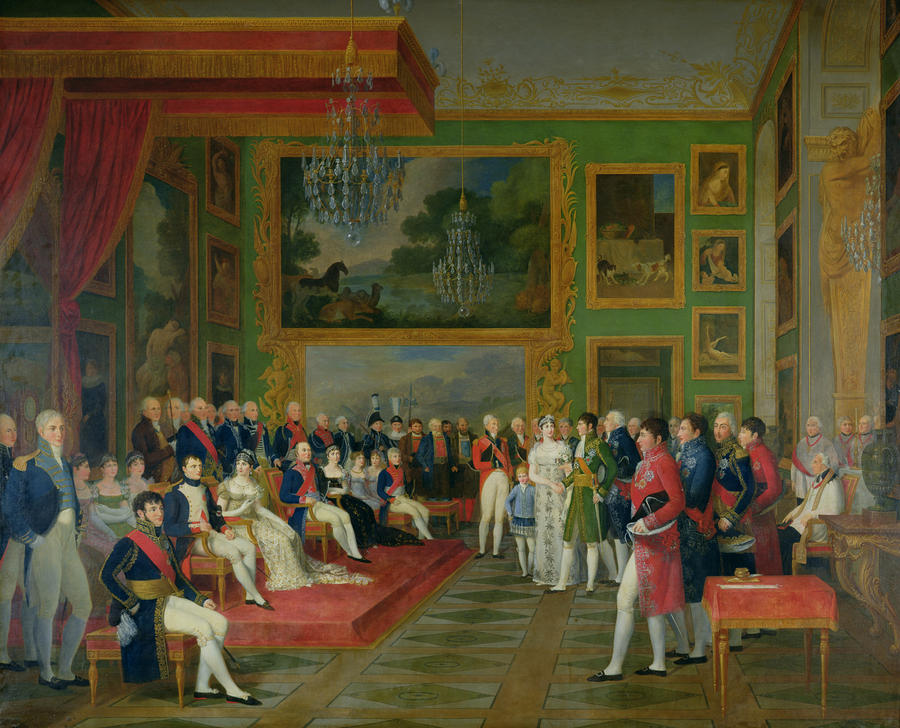
Augusta's marriage to Eugène de Beauharnais, by François Guillaume Menageot

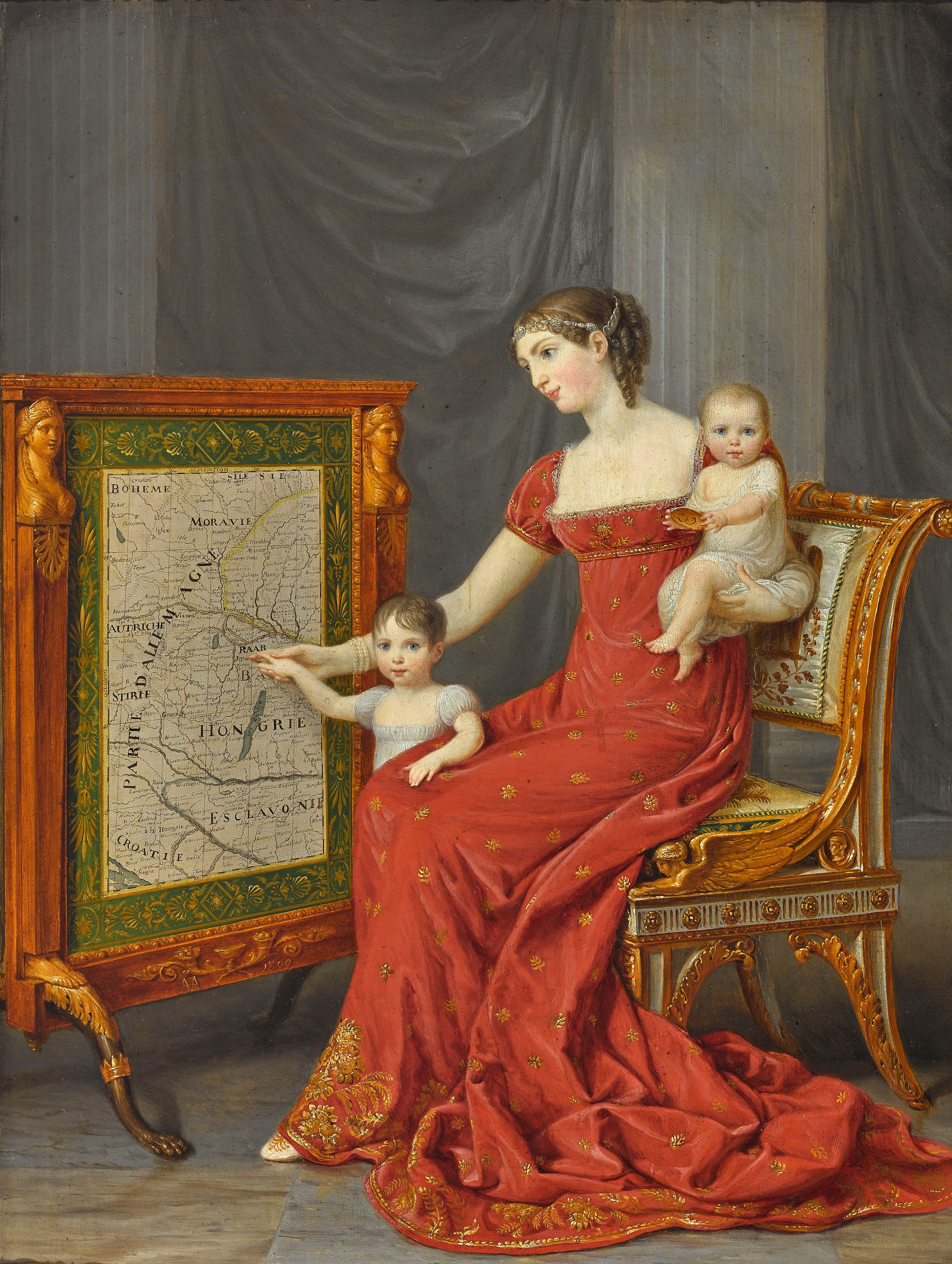
Augusta with her daughters Joséphine and Eugénie

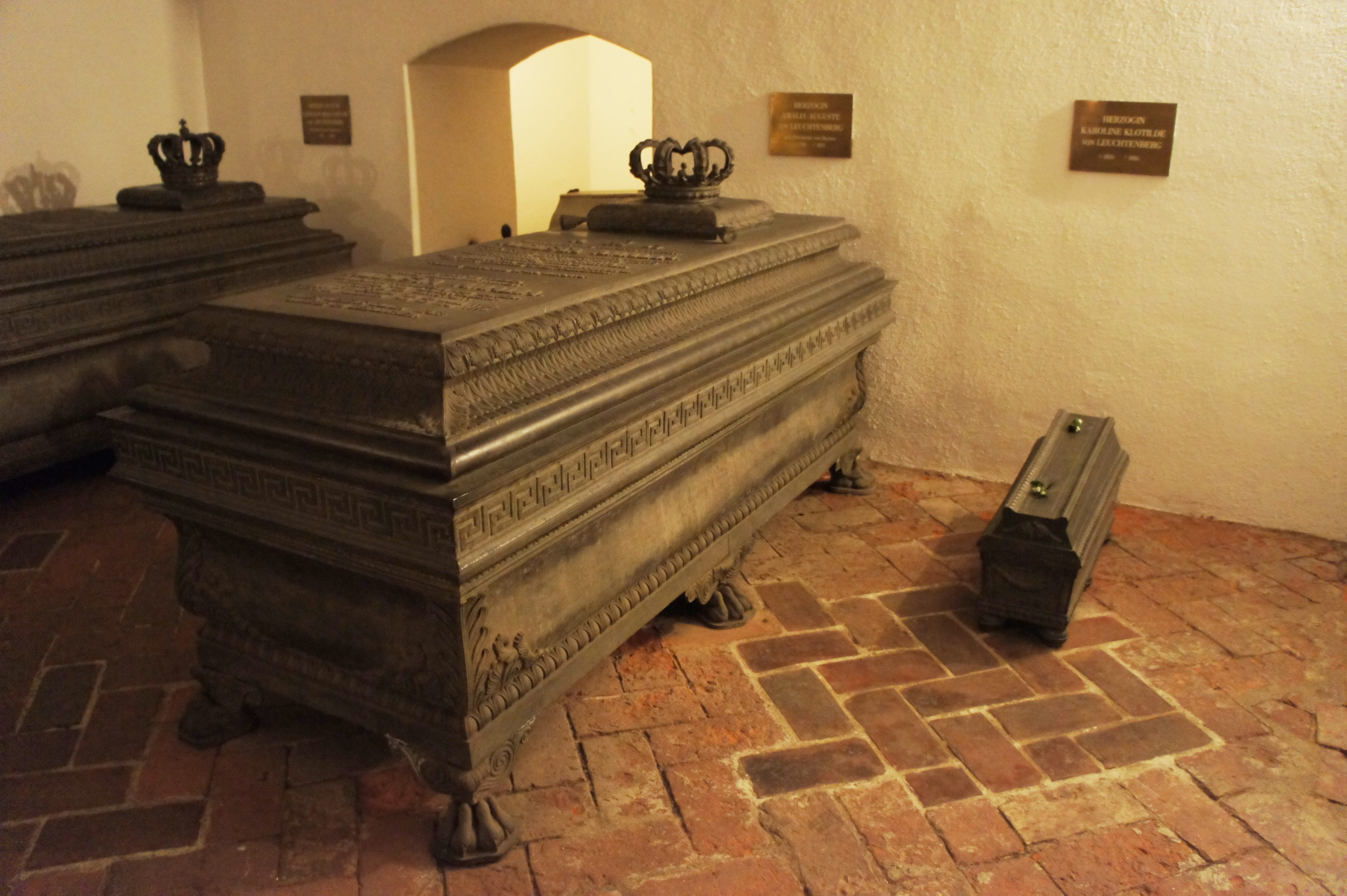
Tomb of Augusta of Bavaria

== Honours ==
- Kingdom of Portugal: Dame Grand Cross of the Order of Saint Isabel, 1 December 1834

== Ancestry ==
Ancestors of Princess Augusta of Bavaria

8. Christian III, Count Palatine of Zweibrücken
4. Frederick Michael, Count Palatine of Zweibrücken
9. Countess Caroline of Nassau-Saarbrücken
2. Maximilian I Joseph of Bavaria
10. Joseph Charles, Hereditary Prince of Sulzbach
5. Countess Palatine Maria Franziska of Sulzbach
11. Countess Palatine Elisabeth Auguste Sofie of Neuburg
1. Princess Augusta of Bavaria
12. Louis VIII, Landgrave of Hesse-Darmstadt
6. Prince George William of Hesse-Darmstadt
13. Countess Charlotte of Hanau-Lichtenberg
3. Princess Augusta Wilhelmine of Hesse-Darmstadt
14. Count Christian Karl Reinhard of Leiningen-Dagsburg-Falkenburg
7. Countess Maria Louise Albertine of Leiningen-Dagsburg-Falkenburg
15. Countess Katharina Polyxena of Solms-Rödelheim

Princess Augusta of Bavaria House of Wittelsbach Born: 21 June 1788 Died: 13 May 1851
German royalty
Preceded by None	Duchess of Leuchtenberg; 1817–1824	Succeeded by Maria Nikolaevna of Russia
