= Caroline Augusta of Bavaria =

Empress of Austria from 1816 to 1835

- Crown Princess of Württemberg
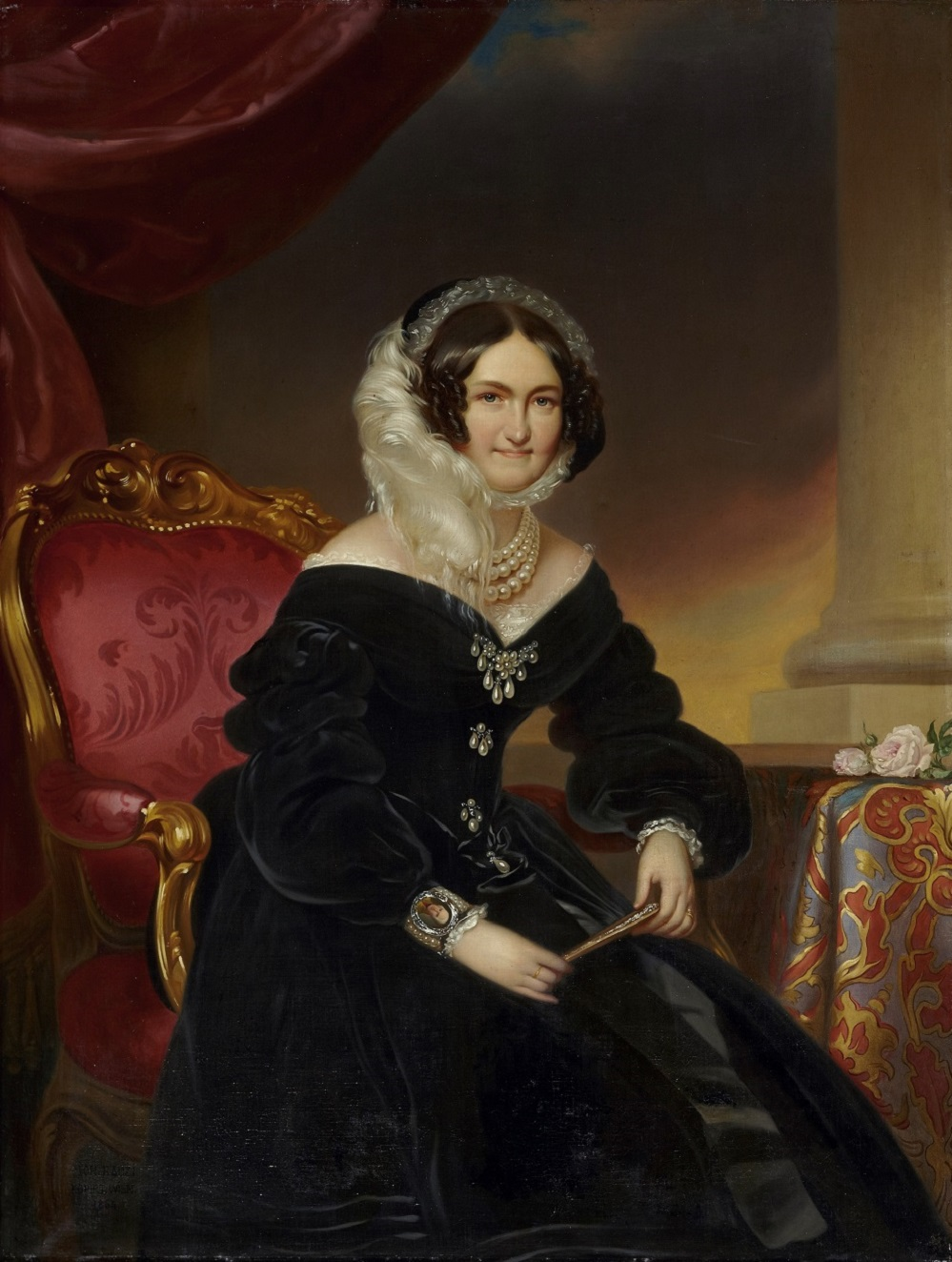
- 1864 portrait

Empress consort of Austria Queen consort of Hungary
- Tenure: 29 October 1816 – 2 March 1835
- Coronation: 25 September 1825, St. Martin's Cathedral
- Born: 8 February 1792; Mannheim, Electoral Palatinate
- Died: 9 February 1873 (aged 81); Vienna, Austria-Hungary
- Spouses: William, Crown Prince of Württemberg (later William I) (m. 1808; div. 1814) Francis I of Austria (m. 1816; died 1835)
- House: Wittelsbach
- Father: Maximilian I Joseph of Bavaria
- Mother: Augusta Wilhelmine of Hesse-Darmstadt

Caroline Augusta of Bavaria (German: Karoline Auguste; 8 February 1792 – 9 February 1873) was Empress of Austria by marriage to Francis I of Austria. She was the penultimate child and third daughter of King Maximilian I Joseph of Bavaria and Princess Augusta Wilhelmine of Hesse-Darmstadt. She firstly married to Crown Prince William of Württemberg in 1808, but they lived separately in 1814.

== Early life ==
Caroline Augusta was born on 8 February 1792 in Mannheim, then in Electoral Palatinate. She was the fourth child and third daughter of Maximilian I Joseph of Bavaria and his wife, Princess Augusta Wilhelmine of Hesse-Darmstadt. At the age of two, Caroline Augusta caught smallpox.

== First marriage ==
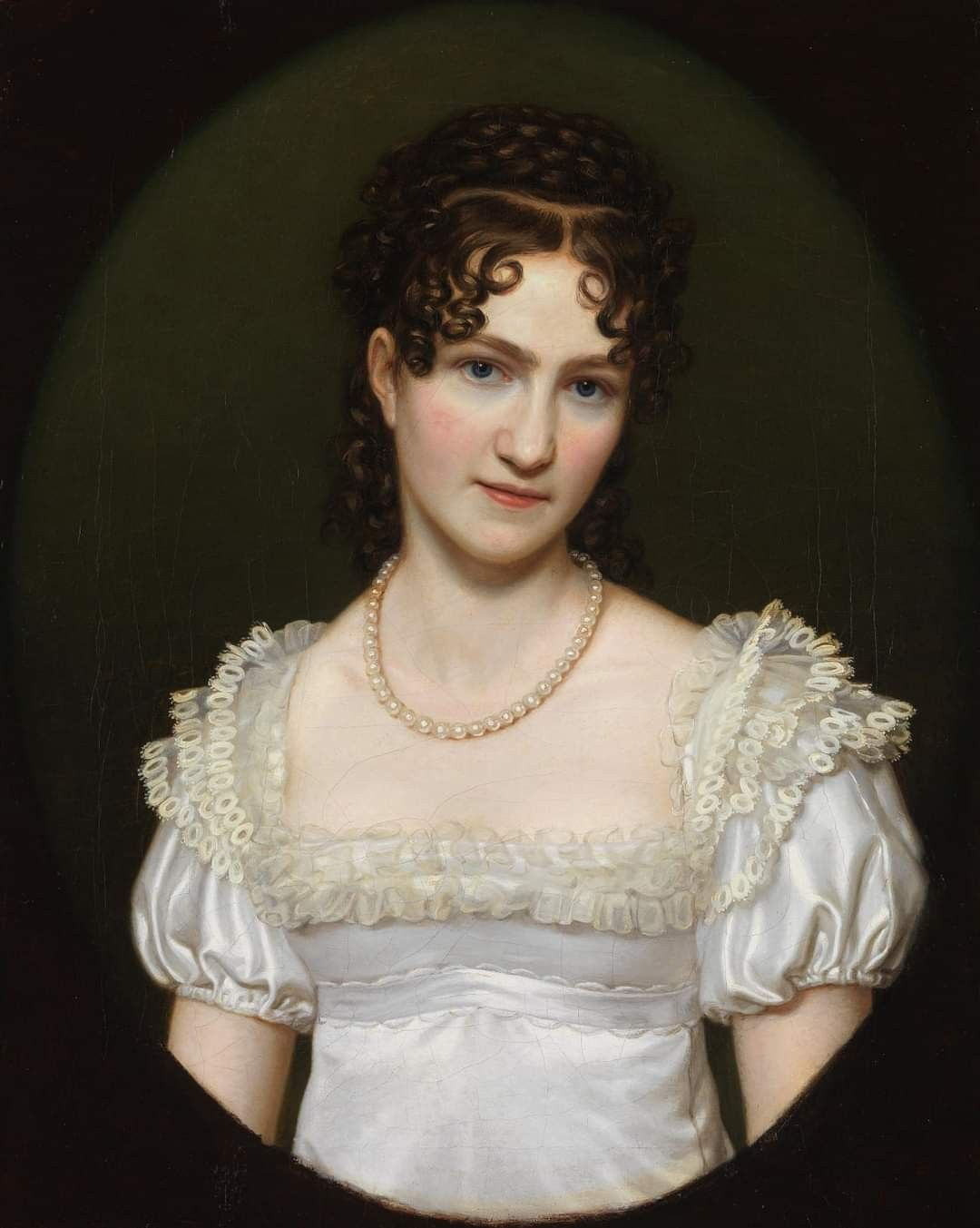
Caroline Augusta as crown princess of Württemberg (portrait by Joseph Karl Stieler, 1814)

On 8 June 1808, in Munich, Caroline Augusta married Crown Prince William of Württemberg, becoming crown princess of Württemberg. They had no children and were living separately on 31 August 1814.

Her first marriage was arranged to avoid a political marriage arranged by Napoleon. After the marriage ceremony, her spouse said to her: "We are victims to politics." She spent her time writing letters to her brother Ludwig, and learning Italian and English. The couple never bonded with each other and the marriage was finally annulled by Pope Pius VII to enable both of them to make remarriages that were valid in the Catholic Church. At the time of the annulment, it was claimed by them that they had lived separately in the palace and that the marriage had never been consummated.

== Empress ==
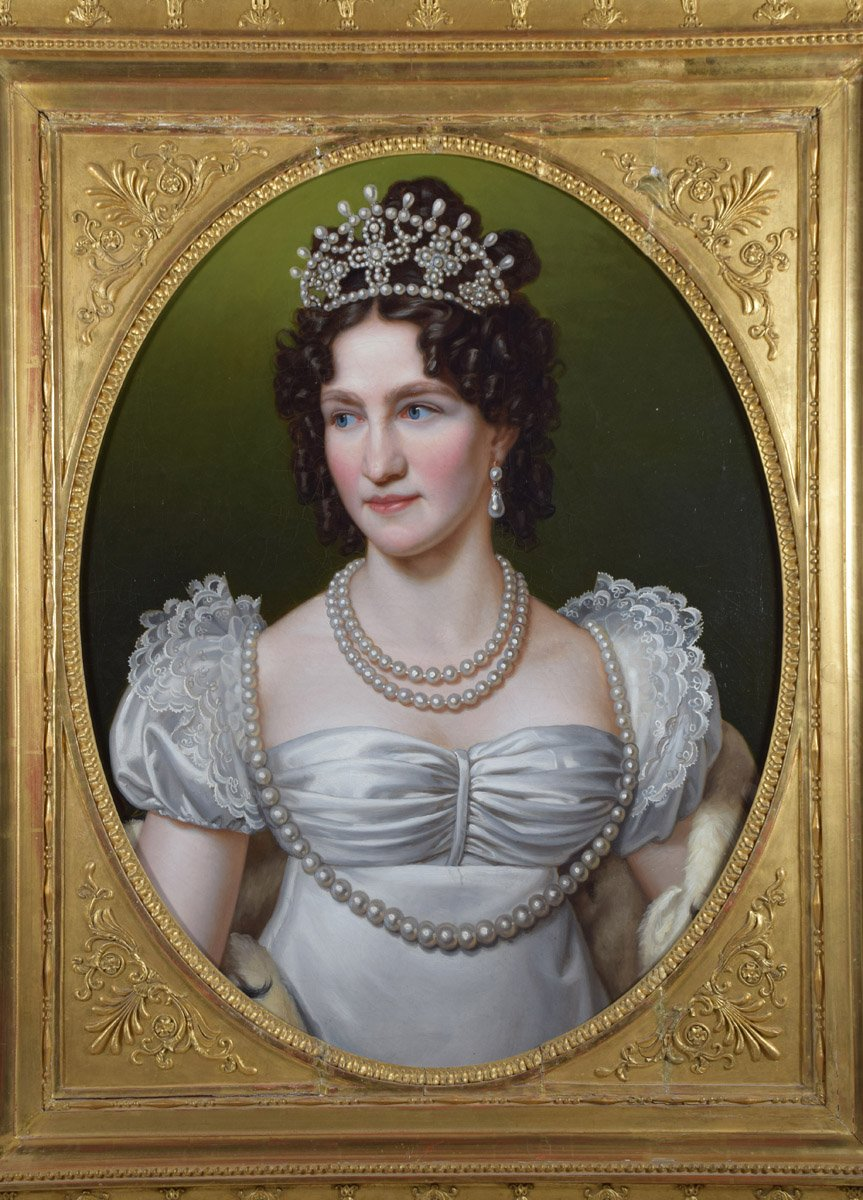
Caroline Augusta as empress (portrait by Stieler, c. 1816–1819)

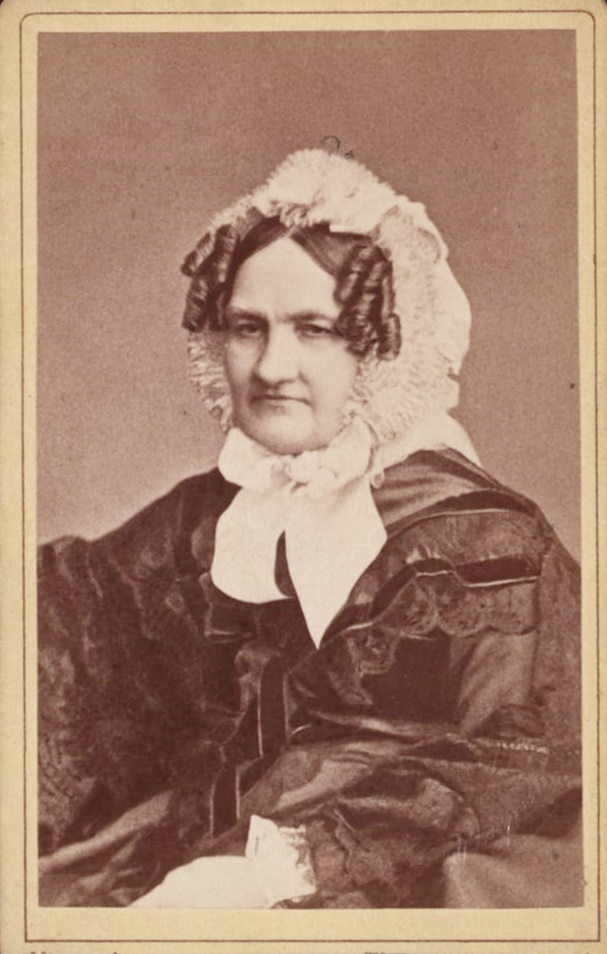
Photograph of Caroline Augusta in c. 1860

After the annulment of her marriage, Caroline Augusta was considered as a bride for both the Emperor Francis I and his younger brother, Ferdinand. Later, Ferdinand III, Grand Duke of Tuscany withdrew his proposal and Caroline Augusta became the emperor's bride.

On 29 October 1816, Caroline Augusta married Francis I, Emperor of Austria, King of Hungary and Bohemia. She became the fourth wife of the emperor, who was 24 years older than her and had fathered thirteen children by two of his previous wives. The English diplomat Frederick Lamb called the new empress "ugly, clever and amiable," and the emperor her husband had this to say of her: "She can stand a push, the other was nothing but air." The wedding, and indeed their married life, was very simple due to the strict economy favoured by the emperor. Prior to this marriage, Caroline Augusta had always been known as Charlotte, but now she began using the name Caroline.

This marriage, which lasted until the emperor's death almost 20 years later in 1835, was harmonious but remained childless. She became popular in Austria and was active in social work; she founded several hospitals and residences for the poor. After the death of her spouse in 1835, she moved to Salzburg and lived there in quiet dignity until her own death nearly four decades later. The dowager empress died in February 1873, one day after her 81st birthday.

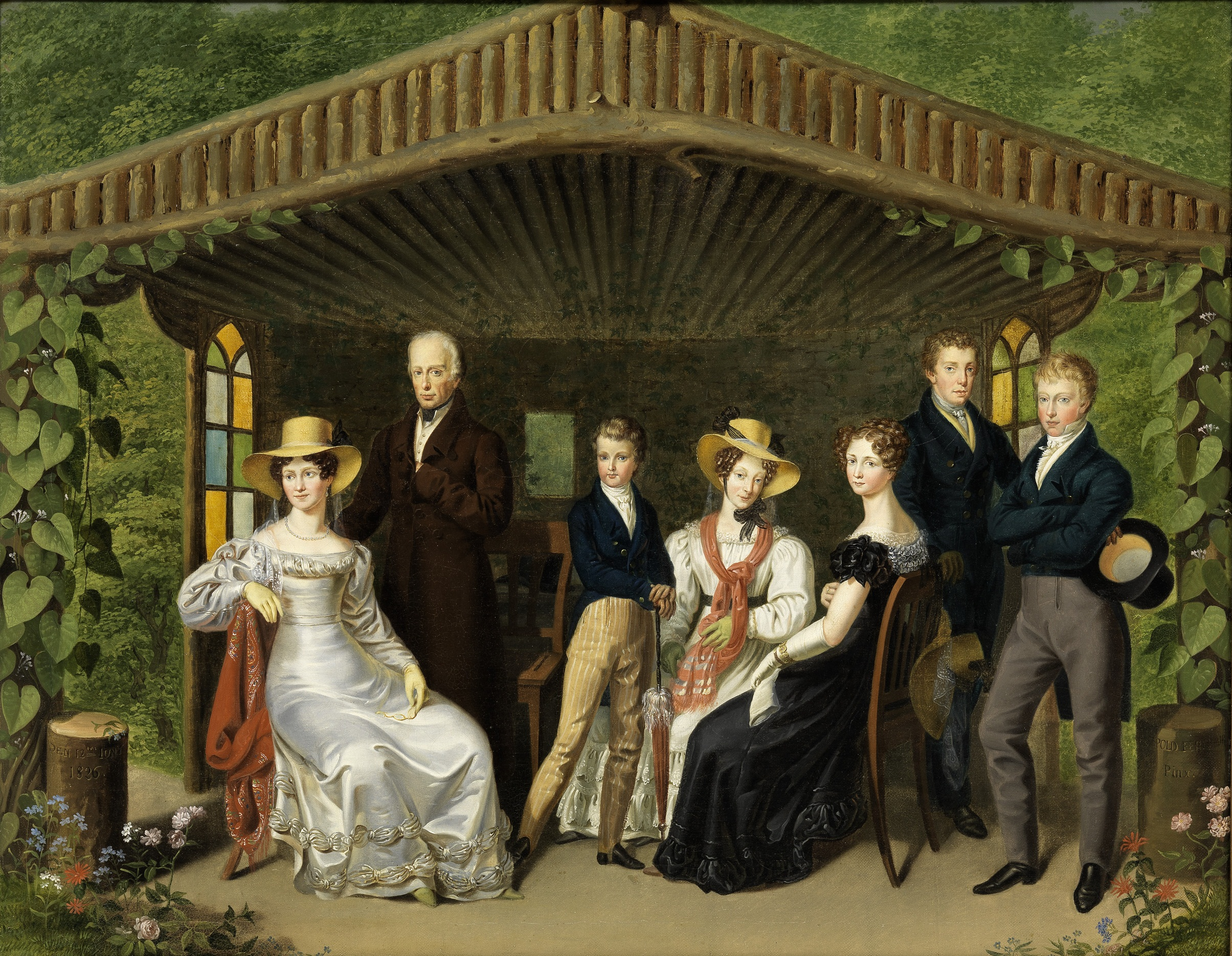
Family portrait of the imperial family around the Duke of Reichstadt (1826, Leopold Fertbauer). From left to right: Caroline Augusta, Empress of Austria; Francis II, Emperor of Austria; Napoleon II of France, Duke of Reichstadt; Marie-Louise of Austria, Duchess of Parma; Princess Sophie of Bavaria, Archduchess of Austria; Ferdinand I of Austria; and Archduke Franz Karl of Austria.

Like her husband Francis, who was devoted to his family and exhorted his heir in his last testament to "Preserve unity in the family and regard it as one of the highest goods," Caroline Augusta also was close to her relatives, especially her sister and niece who were also married into the imperial family. She was also close to her stepdaughter's son, Napoleon II. She was good friends with her half-sister, the Archduchess Sophie of Bavaria, who was married in 1824 to Caroline's step-son Archduke Franz Karl of Austria and would become the mother of two emperors, Franz Joseph of Austria-Hungary, and Maximilian I of Mexico. She was also close to her half-niece, the Empress Elisabeth, who was Sophie's niece and daughter-in-law.

A pearl brooch formerly owned by Caroline Augusta was auctioned at Sotheby's in 2012.

== Ancestry ==
Ancestors of Caroline Augusta of Bavaria

8. Christian III, Count Palatine of Zweibrücken
4. Frederick Michael, Count Palatine of Zweibrücken
9. Countess Caroline of Nassau-Saarbrücken
2. Maximilian I Joseph of Bavaria
10. Joseph Charles, Hereditary Prince of Sulzbach
5. Countess Palatine Maria Franziska of Sulzbach
11. Countess Palatine Elisabeth Auguste Sofie of Neuburg
1. Caroline Augusta of Bavaria
12. Louis VIII, Landgrave of Hesse-Darmstadt
6. Prince George William of Hesse-Darmstadt
13. Countess Charlotte of Hanau-Lichtenberg
3. Princess Augusta Wilhelmine of Hesse-Darmstadt
14. Count Christian Karl Reinhard of Leiningen-Dagsburg-Falkenburg
7. Countess Maria Louise Albertine of Leiningen-Dagsburg-Falkenburg
15. Countess Katharina Polyxena of Solms-Rödelheim

Caroline Augusta of Bavaria House of Wittelsbach Born: 8 February 1792 Died: 9 February 1873
Royal titles
Preceded by Maria Ludovika of Austria-Este	Empress consort of Austria; Queen consort of Dalmatia; Queen consort of Galicia and Lodomeria; Queen consort of Illyria; Queen consort of Lombardy-Venetia; 1816–1835	Succeeded by Maria Anna of Savoy
Preceded by Maria Ludovika of Austria-Este	Queen consort of Hungary; Queen consort of Croatia; Queen consort of Slavonia; 1816–1835	Succeeded by Maria Anna of Savoy
Preceded by Maria Ludovika of Austria-Este	Queen consort of Bohemia; 1816–1835	Succeeded by Maria Anna of Savoy
