= Princess Augusta Wilhelmine of Hesse-Darmstadt =

German princess

Augusta Wilhelmina
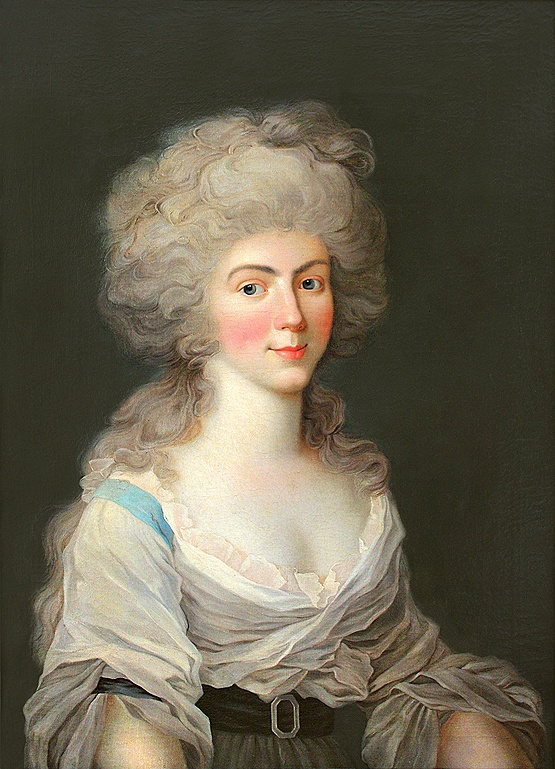
- Portrait c. 1790

Duchess consort of Zweibrücken
- Tenure: 1 April 1795 – 30 March 1796
- Born: 14 April 1765; Darmstadt, Landgraviate of Hesse-Darmstadt
- Died: 30 March 1796 (aged 30); Rohrbach, Electoral Palatinate
- Burial: Stadtkirche Darmstadt
- Spouse: Maximilian, Duke of Zweibrücken (m. 1785)
- Issue: Ludwig I; Princess Augusta, Duchess of Leuchtenberg; Princess Amalie; Caroline Augusta, Empress of Austria; Prince Karl Theodor
Names
- German: Augusta Wilhelmina Maria
- House: Hesse-Darmstadt
- Father: Prince George William of Hesse-Darmstadt
- Mother: Countess Maria Louise Albertine of Leiningen-Dagsburg-Falkenburg

Princess Augusta Wilhelmina of Hesse-Darmstadt (German: Augusta Wilhelmina Maria von Hessen-Darmstadt; 14 April 1765 – 30 March 1796) was Duchess consort of Zweibrücken by marriage to Maximilian, Duke of Zweibrücken and the mother of King Ludwig I of Bavaria.

== Biography ==
Augusta Wilhelmina was born in Darmstadt, the fourth daughter and ninth child of Prince George William of Hesse-Darmstadt (second son of Louis VIII, Landgrave of Hesse-Darmstadt) and Countess Maria Louise Albertine of Leiningen-Falkenburg-Dagsburg.

=== Marriage ===
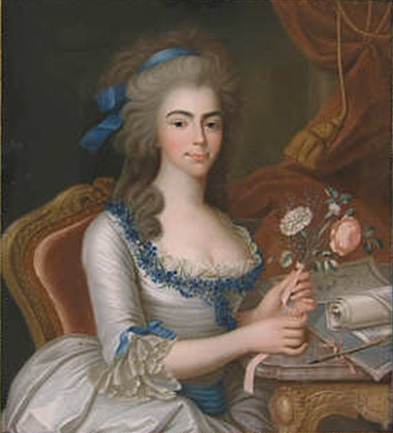
Portrait by Johann Friedrich Dryander, c. 1785

On 30 September 1785, in Darmstadt, Augusta Wilhelmina married Maximilian, Count Palatine of Zweibrücken (later King Maximilian I Joseph of Bavaria).

Maximilian was an officer in the French army stationed at Strasbourg, but the couple also often visited Paris. There, Augusta Wilhelmina met Queen Marie Antoinette, with whom she maintained an ongoing correspondence.

In 1789, Maximilian's regiment rose in revolt and he and Augusta Wilhelmina fled to her parents' home in Darmstadt. For the next five years, they lived mostly in the neighboring town of Mannheim. In December 1794, the French army attacked Mannheim. Augusta Wilhelmina fled the city when her home was shelled by French artillery.

=== Duchess of Zweibrücken ===
In April 1795, Maximilian succeeded his brother as reigning Duke of Zweibrücken; however, his duchy was entirely occupied by the French. In March 1796, Augusta Wilhelmina, who had always had delicate lungs, finally succumbed and died at Rohrbach. Her death plunged Maximilian into deep mourning. He wrote some poems in memory of his wife. She was buried in the Schlosskirche in Darmstadt.

== Issue ==
Augusta Wilhelmina had five children:

- Prince Ludwig (1786–1868), married Therese of Saxe-Hildburghausen.
- Princess Augusta Amalia Ludovika, (21 June 1788 – 13 May 1851), married Eugène de Beauharnais, Duke of Leuchtenberg, Prince of Eichstätt.
- Princess Amalia Maria Augusta (9 October 1790 – 24 January 1794), died in childhood.
- Princess Caroline Augusta (8 February 1792 – 9 February 1873), married William I of Württemberg, and then Francis II of Austria.
- Prince Karl Theodor Maximilian (7 July 1795 – 16 August 1875).

== Ancestry ==
Ancestors of Princess Augusta Wilhelmine of Hesse-Darmstadt

8. Ernest Louis, Landgrave of Hesse-Darmstadt
4. Louis VIII, Landgrave of Hesse-Darmstadt
9. Princess Dorothea Charlotte of Brandenburg-Ansbach
2. Prince George William of Hesse-Darmstadt
10. Johann Reinhard III, Count of Hanau-Lichtenberg
5. Countess Charlotte of Hanau-Lichtenberg
11. Princess Dorothea Friederike of Brandenburg-Ansbach
1. Princess Augusta Wilhelmine of Hesse-Darmstadt
12. Johann, Count of Leiningen-Dagsburg-Falkenburg
6. Count Christian Karl Reinhard of Leiningen-Dagsburg-Falkenburg
13. Countess Johanna Magdalene of Hanau-Lichtenberg
3. Countess Maria Louise Albertine of Leiningen-Dagsburg-Falkenburg
14. Count Georg Ludwig of Solms-Rödelheim
7. Countess Katharina Polyxena of Solms-Rödelheim
15. Countess Charlotte Sibylle of Ahlefeldt

== Bibliography ==
- Winkler, Wilhelm. "Die Mutter König Ludwig I. von Bayern nach ungedruckten Briefen", Die Wächter (1924).
