= Prince George Charles of Hesse-Darmstadt =

German prince (1754–1830)

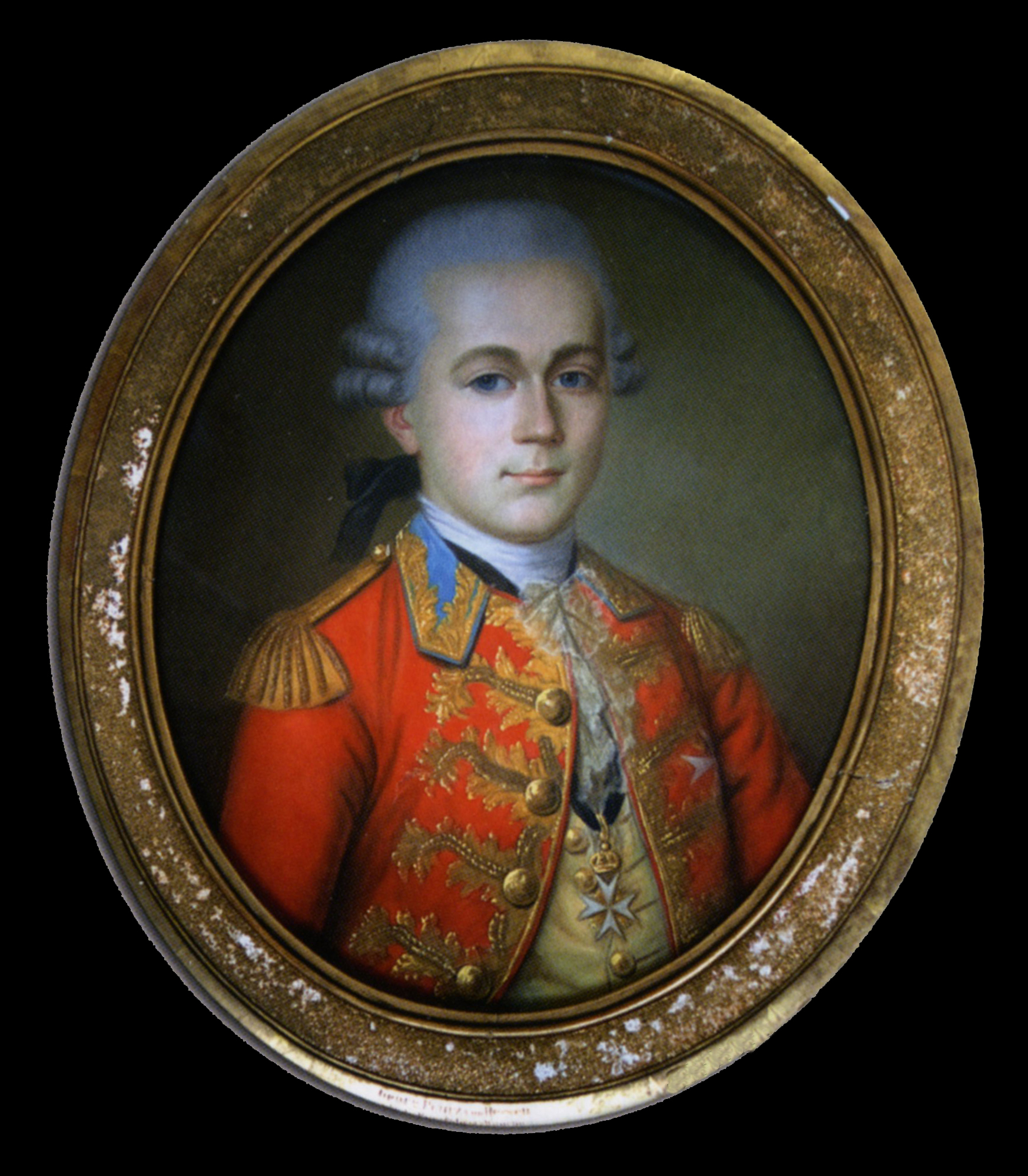
Prince George Charles as an adult

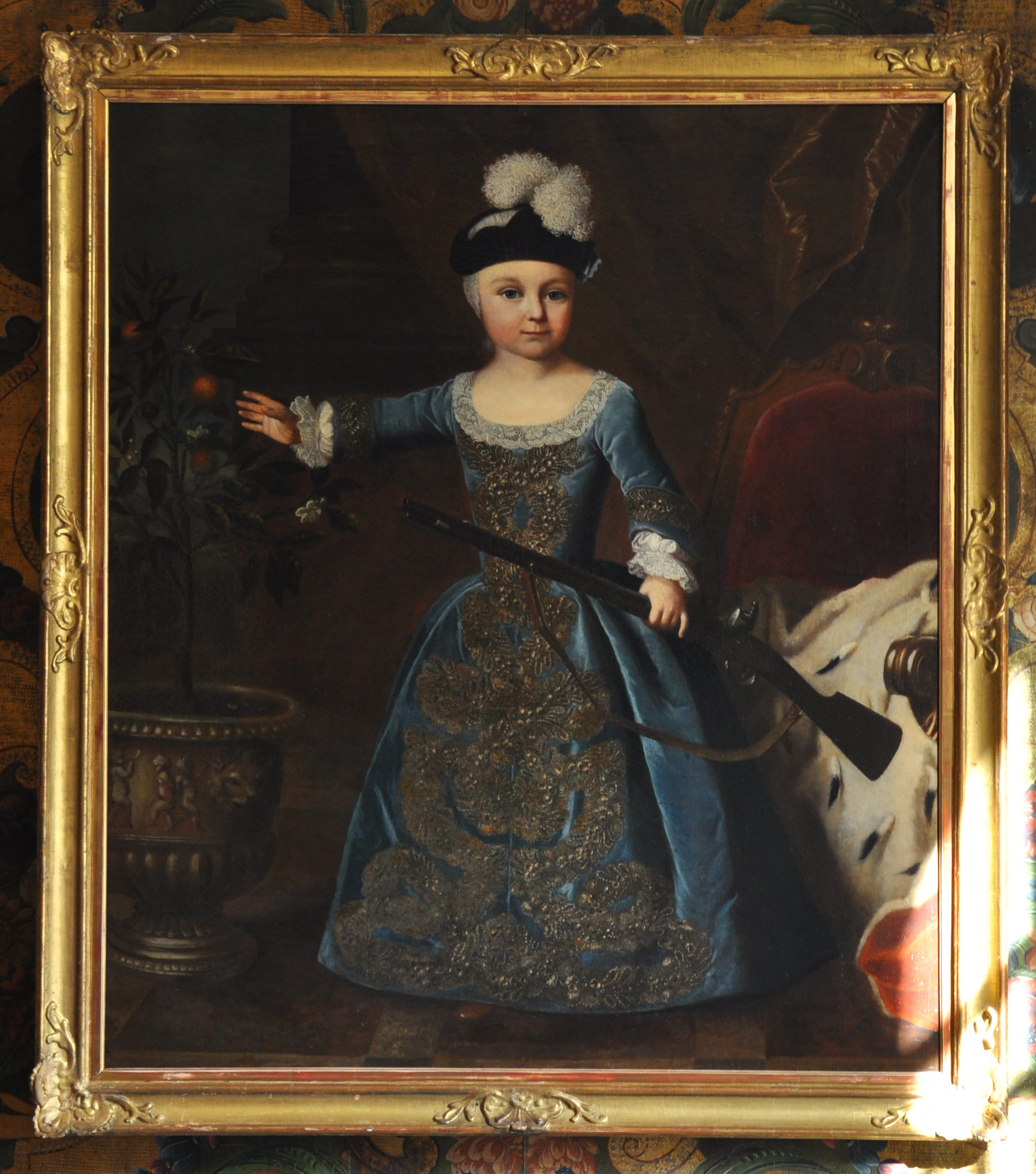
George Charles as an infant.

George Charles (German: Georg Karl) of Hesse-Darmstadt (14 June 1754 - 28 January 1830, Schüttrisberg, now in Slovakia) was a German prince of the House of Hesse-Darmstadt. He was the fourth child and third son of Prince George William of Hesse-Darmstadt and his wife, Countess Maria Louise Albertine of Leiningen-Dagsburg-Falkenburg. He never married, and had no children.

== Ancestry ==
Ancestors of Prince George Charles of Hesse-Darmstadt

16. Louis VI, Landgrave of Hesse-Darmstadt
8. Ernest Louis, Landgrave of Hesse-Darmstadt
17. Princess Elisabeth Dorothea of Saxe-Gotha-Altenburg
4. Louis VIII, Landgrave of Hesse-Darmstadt
18. Albert II, Margrave of Brandenburg-Ansbach
9. Princess Dorothea Charlotte of Brandenburg-Ansbach
19. Countess Sophia Margaret of Oettingen-Oettingen
2. Prince George William of Hesse-Darmstadt
20. Johann Reinhard II, Count of Hanau-Lichtenberg
10. Johann Reinhard III, Count of Hanau-Lichtenberg
21. Countess Palatine Anna Magdalena of Birkenfeld-Bischweiler
5. Countess Charlotte of Hanau-Lichtenberg
22. John Frederick, Margrave of Brandenburg-Ansbach
11. Princess Dorothea Friederike of Brandenburg-Ansbach
23. Margravine Johanna Elisabeth of Baden-Durlach
1. Prince George Charles of Hesse-Darmstadt
24. Count George William of Leiningen-Dagsburg-Falkenburg
12. Johann, Count of Leiningen-Dagsburg-Falkenburg
25. Countess Anna Elisabeth of Daun-Falkenstein
6. Count Christian Karl Reinhard of Leiningen-Dagsburg-Falkenburg
26. Johann Reinhard II, Count of Hanau-Lichtenberg (= 20)
13. Countess Johanna Magdalene of Hanau-Lichtenberg
27. Countess Palatine Anna Magdalena of Birkenfeld-Bischweiler (= 21)
3. Countess Maria Louise Albertine of Leiningen-Dagsburg-Falkenburg
28. Count Johann August of Solms-Rödelheim-Assenheim
14. Count Georg Ludwig of Solms-Rödelheim
29. Countess Eleonore Barbara Marie Cratz of Scharffenstein
7. Countess Katharina Polyxena of Solms-Rödelheim
30. Count Friedrich of Ahlefeldt
15. Countess Charlotte Sibylle of Ahlefeldt
31. Countess Maria Elisabeth of Leiningen-Dagsburg-Hartenburg
