= Princess Charlotte of Hesse-Darmstadt =

Charlotte of Hesse-Darmstadt
- Duchess Charles of Mecklenburg-Strelitz
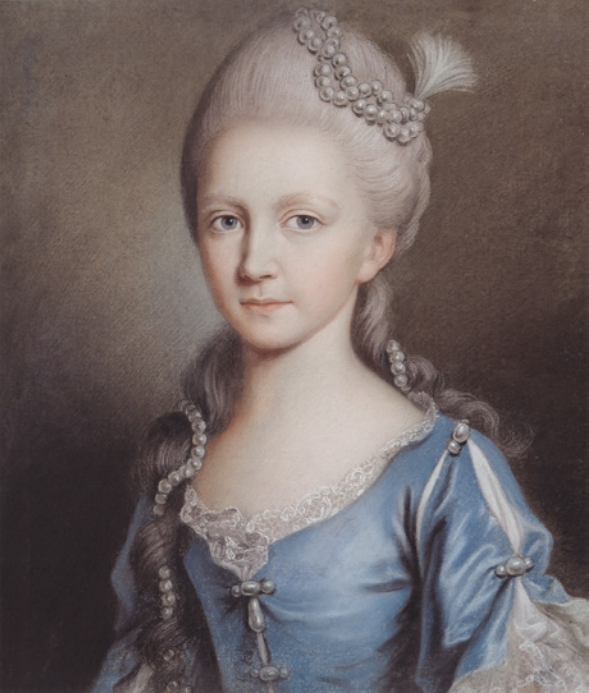
- Portrait by Charles-Alexis Huin, 1766
- Born: 5 November 1755; Darmstadt
- Died: 12 December 1785 (aged 30); Hanover
- Spouse: Charles II, Grand Duke of Mecklenburg (m. 1784)
- Issue: Duke Charles of Mecklenburg
- House: Hesse-Darmstadt
- Father: Prince George William of Hesse-Darmstadt
- Mother: Countess Maria Louise Albertine of Leiningen-Falkenburg-Dagsburg

Charlotte Wilhelmine Christiane Marie of Hesse-Darmstadt (5 November 1755 – 12 December 1785), was by marriage Duchess of Mecklenburg-Strelitz.

== Life ==
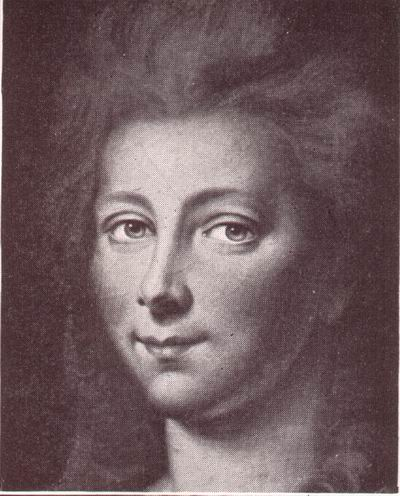
Charlotte as an adult

Charlotte was a daughter of Prince George William of Hesse-Darmstadt (1722-1782) from his marriage to Countess Maria Louise Albertine of Leiningen-Falkenburg-Dagsburg (1729-1818), daughter of Count Christian Karl Reinhard of Leiningen-Dachsburg-Falkenburg-Heidesheim.

The princess was first engaged with the hereditary prince Peter Frederick William of Oldenburg, but the engagement was dissolved again as a result of the onset of Peter's mental illness.

Charlotte married Charles of Mecklenburg-Strelitz (who later became the Duke of Mecklenburg-Strelitz), on 28 September 1784 in Darmstadt. He was previously married to Charlotte's older sister Friederike, who had died in childbirth. She thus became stepmother for her sister's five surviving children - her nieces and nephews.

The couple lived in Hanover, where Charles served as Governor-General for his brother-in-law, King George. Charlotte was delivered of a healthy boy in late 1785, but the birth was difficult and Charlotte died as a result. Charles resigned from his post in Hanover and moved to Charlotte's mother in Darmstadt, who then took care of his children (both Frederike's and Charlotte's).

== Offspring ==
Her only child from her marriage to Charles was:

- Charles (1785-1837), General and President of the Prussian State Council

== Ancestry ==
Ancestors of Princess Charlotte of Hesse-Darmstadt

16. Louis VI, Landgrave of Hesse-Darmstadt
8. Ernest Louis, Landgrave of Hesse-Darmstadt
17. Princess Elisabeth Dorothea of Saxe-Gotha-Altenburg
4. Louis VIII, Landgrave of Hesse-Darmstadt
18. Albert II, Margrave of Brandenburg-Ansbach
9. Princess Dorothea Charlotte of Brandenburg-Ansbach
19. Countess Sophia Margaret of Oettingen-Oettingen
2. Prince George William of Hesse-Darmstadt
20. Johann Reinhard II, Count of Hanau-Lichtenberg
10. Johann Reinhard III, Count of Hanau-Lichtenberg
21. Countess Palatine Anna Magdalena of Birkenfeld-Bischweiler
5. Countess Charlotte of Hanau-Lichtenberg
22. John Frederick, Margrave of Brandenburg-Ansbach
11. Princess Dorothea Friederike of Brandenburg-Ansbach
23. Margravine Johanna Elisabeth of Baden-Durlach
1. Princess Charlotte of Hesse-Darmstadt
24. Count George William of Leiningen-Dagsburg-Falkenburg
12. Johann, Count of Leiningen-Dagsburg-Falkenburg
25. Countess Anna Elisabeth of Daun-Falkenstein
6. Count Christian Karl Reinhard of Leiningen-Dagsburg-Falkenburg
26. Johann Reinhard II, Count of Hanau-Lichtenberg (= 20)
13. Countess Johanna Magdalene of Hanau-Lichtenberg
27. Countess Palatine Anna Magdalena of Birkenfeld-Bischweiler (= 21)
3. Countess Maria Louise Albertine of Leiningen-Falkenburg-Dagsburg
28. Count Johann August of Solms-Rödelheim-Assenheim
14. Count Georg Ludwig of Solms-Rödelheim
29. Countess Eleonore Barbara Marie Cratz of Scharffenstein
7. Countess Katharina Polyxena of Solms-Rödelheim
30. Count Friedrich of Ahlefeldt
15. Countess Charlotte Sibylle of Ahlefeldt
31. Countess Maria Elisabeth of Leiningen-Dagsburg-Hartenburg

== Sources ==
=== Bibliography ===
- Günther, Carl Friedrich (1843). Anecdotes, character sketches and memoirs from Hesse (in German).
- Busching (1785). Politisches journal: nebst Anzeige von gelehrten und andern Sachen (in German). Vol. 2.
- Schorn-Schütte, Luise (2003). Königin Luise: Leben und Legende (in German).
