= Prince Louis George Charles of Hesse-Darmstadt =

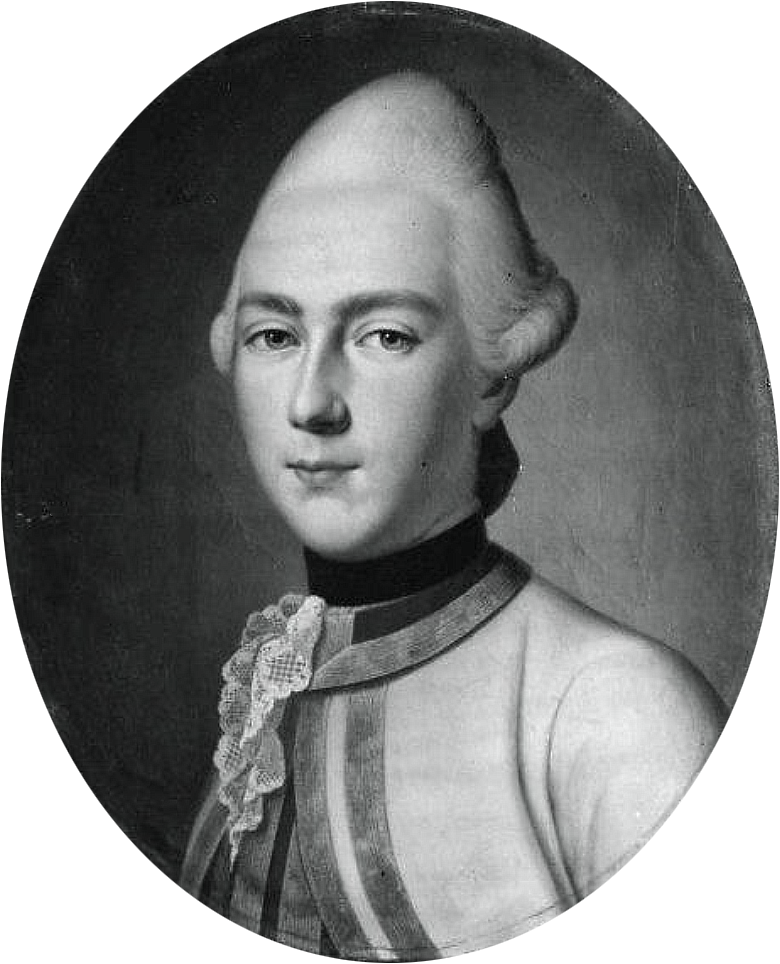
Ludwig Georg Karl of Hesse-Darmstadt

Louis George Charles (German: Ludwig Georg Karl or Carl), Prince of Hesse-Darmstadt (27 March 1749, Darmstadt - 26 October 1823, Darmstadt) was a German field marshal in the service of the Upper Rhenish Circle. He is also known in the primary and secondary sources as Prince Louis.

== Life ==
Ludwig Georg Karl of Hesse-Darmstadt was the son of Prince George William of Hesse-Darmstadt (1722–1782) and Countess Maria Louise Albertine of Leiningen-Dagsburg-Falkenburg (1729–1818).

== Wives ==
=== Luise Pfahler nee Weiss ===
They had a daughter: Friederike Louise von Weiss zum Weissenstein (1794–1854) She never married or had children.

== Additional Issue ==
In addition, Louis George Charles had one illegitimate daughter with his mistress Friederike Kämmerer.

Friederike Elisabeth von Aldersberg zu Aldershöh (19 October, 1811 – 3 February, 1885) she married Karl Hermann Freiherr von Trotha

== Ancestry ==
Ancestors of Prince Louis George Charles of Hesse-Darmstadt

8. Ernest Louis, Landgrave of Hesse-Darmstadt
4. Louis VIII, Landgrave of Hesse-Darmstadt
9. Princess Dorothea Charlotte of Brandenburg-Ansbach
2. Prince George William of Hesse-Darmstadt
10. Johann Reinhard III, Count of Hanau-Lichtenberg
5. Countess Charlotte of Hanau-Lichtenberg
11. Princess Dorothea Friederike of Brandenburg-Ansbach
1. Prince Louis George Charles of Hesse-Darmstadt
12. Johann, Count of Leiningen-Dagsburg-Falkenburg
6. Count Christian Karl Reinhard of Leiningen-Dagsburg-Falkenburg
13. Countess Johanna Magdalene of Hanau-Lichtenberg
3. Countess Maria Louise Albertine of Leiningen-Dagsburg-Falkenburg
14. Count Georg Ludwig of Solms-Rödelheim
7. Countess Katharina Polyxena of Solms-Rödelheim
15. Countess Charlotte Sibylle of Ahlefeldt

== Bibliography ==
- Gustav Lang: Ludwig Georg Karl, Prinz zu Hessen-Darmstadt. In: Hessische Biographien. In Verb. mit Karl Esselborn und Georg Lehnert, hrsg. v. Herman Haupt. Hessischer Staatsverlag, Darmstadt 1927 (Arbeiten der historischen Kommission für den Volksstaat Hessen). Neudruck, Dr. Martin Sändig oHG, Walluf 1973, S. 465–469. ISBN 350026820X.
