= George and William =

George and William may refer to:

- G. W. & W. D. Hewitt, American architects
- George and William Besler, sons of William George Besler, American businessmen who acquired assets for the Doble steam car
- George Chaffey and William Chaffey, Canadian engineers
- George Bent and William Bent, American traders and Civil War figures

== See also ==
- William George (disambiguation)
- George William (disambiguation)
