= George William =

George William may refer to:

- George William, Elector of Brandenburg (1595–1640)
- George William, Duke of Brunswick (1624–1705)
- Prince George William of Hesse-Darmstadt (1722–1782)
- George William, Prince of Schaumburg-Lippe (1784–1860)
- George William, Duke of Liegnitz (1660–1675)
- George William, Count Palatine of Zweibrücken-Birkenfeld (1598–1669)
- Prince George William of Great Britain (1717–1718)
- George William, Margrave of Brandenburg-Bayreuth (1678–1726)

== See also ==
- George (disambiguation)
- William (disambiguation)
- William George (disambiguation)
