= Helena Martini =

Mistress of German royalty

Helena Martini (5 July 1728, Bockenheim (Frankfurt am Main) - 8 July 1803, Darmstadt), was the mistress of Louis VIII, Landgrave of Hesse-Darmstadt, from 1744 until 1768.

== Biography ==
She was the daughter of Carl Ludwig Martini (d. 1698), an officer, and Susanna Catharina Meser. In 1744 her father, seeking a promotion, is alleged to have sent Helena to submit his petition to Louis VIII at Jagdschloss Kranichstein. When Louis VIII met her, he kept her as his mistress and did not let her return. Martini, who became known as Mamsell Lene, enjoyed the unlimited confidence of Louis VIII, was given a house in Darmstadt and accompanied him on his travels. She supported him in his political conflicts with the branches of the Hesse family, and brought the children of her sister to be raised in her care. She reportedly had a good relationship with the family of Louis VIII. Upon his death in 1768, she left the court with a fortune, which she later left to the children of her sister.

== Sources ==
- K. Esselborn, Landgrafengeschichten, Marburg 19193
- Heinrich Ludwig, Geschichte Bockenheims, Verlag Dr. Waldemar Kramer, Frankfurt am Main, 1940
