= William George =

William George (and variants) may refer to:

== Sports ==
=== American football ===
- William George (American football), 1889 College Football All-America selection
- Bill George (American football coach) (active since 1976), American football coach in the United States
- Bill George (linebacker) (1929–1982), American football linebacker for the Chicago Bears and Los Angeles Rams

=== Other sports ===
- Bill George (baseball) (1865–1916), American baseball player
- Billy George (footballer, born 1874) (1874–1933), English footballer and cricketer
- Billy George (footballer, born 1895) (1895–1962), English footballer
- Billy George (gymnast) (born 1991), British gymnast
- W. B. George (1899–1972), president of the Canadian Amateur Hockey Association

== Politics ==
- William George Robertson, Canadian politician
- William James George (1853–1931), Australian politician

== Others ==
- Bill George (businessman) (born 1942), American businessman and academic
- Bill George (dog dealer) (1802–1881), British dog dealer and celebrity
- Bill George (labor activist) (active since 1960), American labor leader
- Bill George (visual effects supervisor) (active since 1979), Academy Award winning visual effects supervisor
- William George (priest) (died 1756), English academic and Anglican churchman
- William George (solicitor) (1865−1967), Welsh lawyer and public figure
- William K. George (born 1945), American fluid dynamicist
- W. R. P. George (William Richard Philip George, 1912–2006), Welsh solicitor and poet
