= Billy George (footballer, born 1895) =

English footballer

Personal information
- Full name: William Samuel George
- Date of birth: 27 July 1895
- Place of birth: Aston, England
- Date of death: 29 September 1962 (aged 67)
- Place of death: Selly Oak, England
- Position: Wing half

Senior career*
Years	Team	Apps	(Gls)
1914–1919	Austin Motor Works		
1919–1920	Merthyr Town		
1920–1921	Sunderland	2	(0)
1921–1922	Shildon Athletic		
1922–1923	Burton All Saints		
1923–192?	Birmingham Corporation Trams		
- * Club domestic league appearances and goals

William Samuel George (27 July 1895 – 29 September 1962) was an English professional footballer who played as a wing half for Sunderland.
