= Prince George William of Hesse-Darmstadt =

Prince of Hesse-Darmstadt (1722–1782)

George William
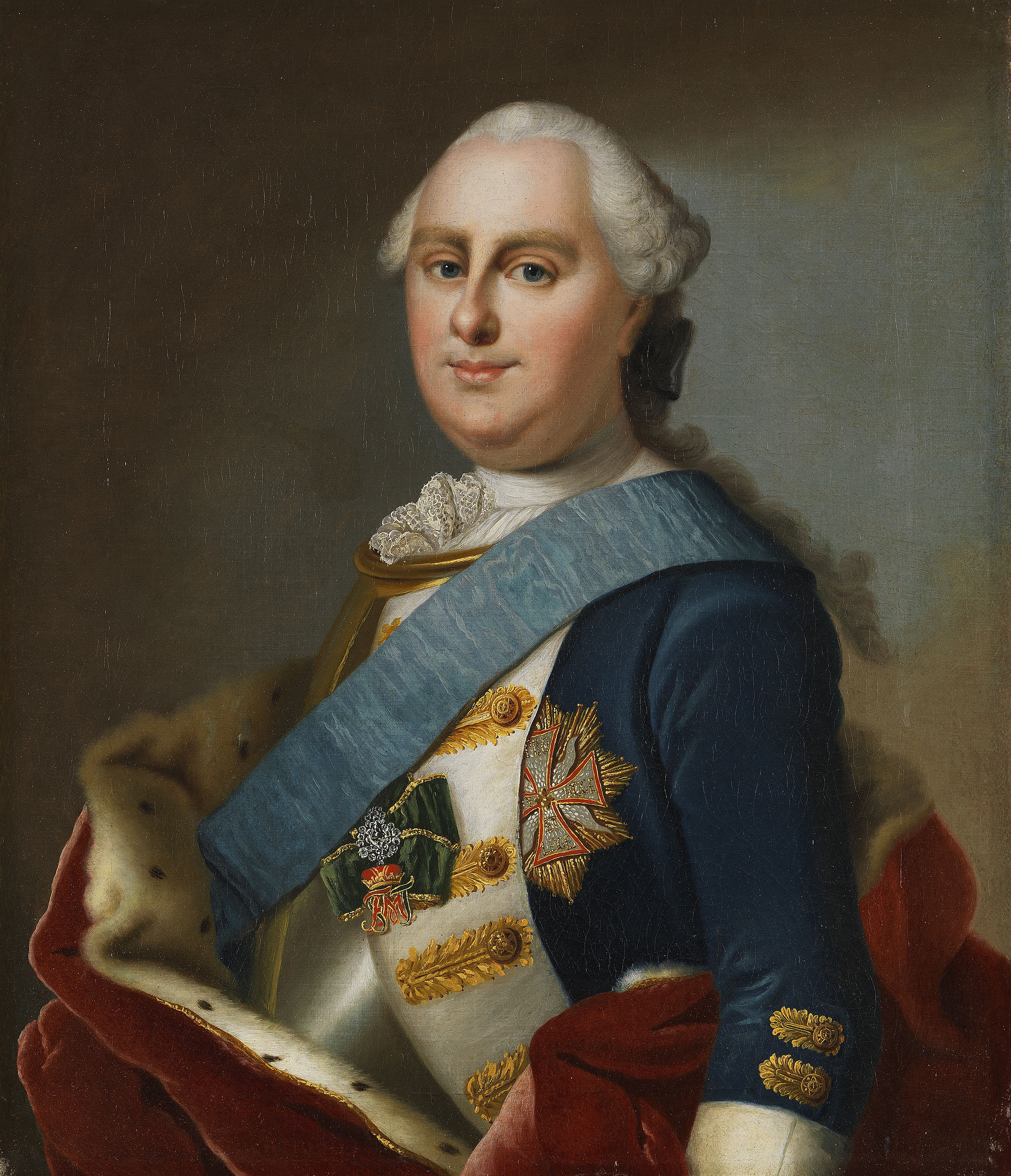
- Portrait by Johann Christian Fiedler c. 1760
- Born: 11 July 1722; Darmstadt
- Died: 21 June 1782 (aged 59); Darmstadt
- Burial: Stadtkirche Darmstadt
- Spouse: Countess Maria Louise Albertine of Leiningen-Dagsburg-Falkenburg (m. 1748)
- Issue among others...: Prince Louis George; Prince George Friedrich; Friederike, Duchess Charles of Mecklenburg-Strelitz; Prince George Charles; Charlotte, Duchess Charles of Mecklenburg-Strelitz; Prince Karl William; Prince Friedrich George; Louise, Grand Duchess of Hesse and by Rhine; Augusta Wilhelmine, Duchess of Zweibrücken
- House: Hesse-Darmstadt
- Father: Louis VIII, Landgrave of Hesse-Darmstadt
- Mother: Charlotte of Hanau-Lichtenberg

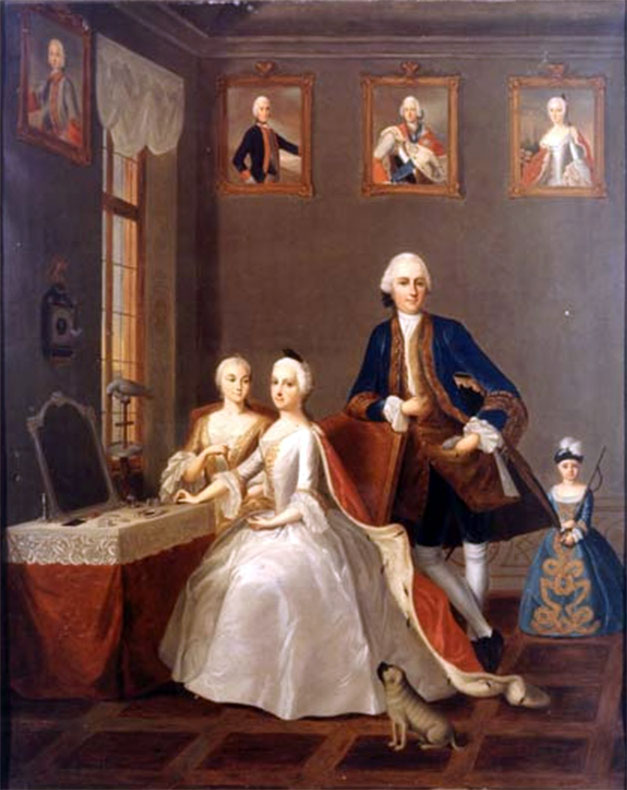
George William and family (1753)

Prince George William of Hesse-Darmstadt (11 July 1722 – 21 June 1782) was a Prince of Hesse-Darmstadt. He was born in Darmstadt.

He was the second son of Landgrave Louis VIII and Charlotte Christine Magdalene Johanna of Hanau-Lichtenberg. From 1738 till his death, he commanded an army-regiment of his land. In the 1740s, he also commanded a Prussian regiment. He reached the rank of general of the cavalry. He was the official military adviser to his father, but had a strong rival in his older brother Louis IX, who followed the example of his friend the soldier-king Frederick II of Prussia and expanded Pirmasens as a garrison town.

In 1748, he married Countess Maria Louise Albertine of Leiningen-Dagsburg-Falkenburg. Through this marriage, he acquired the estates of Broich, Oberstein, Aspermont, Burgel, and Reipolzkirchen. He and Maria had nine children.

In 1764, George William received Old Palace in Darmstadt and the associated pleasure garden as a gift from his father, who had always favoured him above his brother Louis. George William had the palace with the White Tower expanded. He represented the reigning family in Darmstadt, as his brother stayed mostly in Pirmasens.

== Issue ==
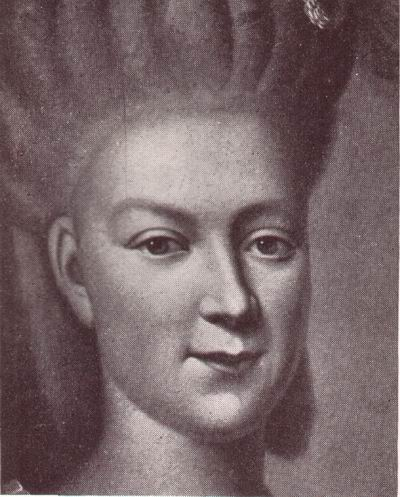
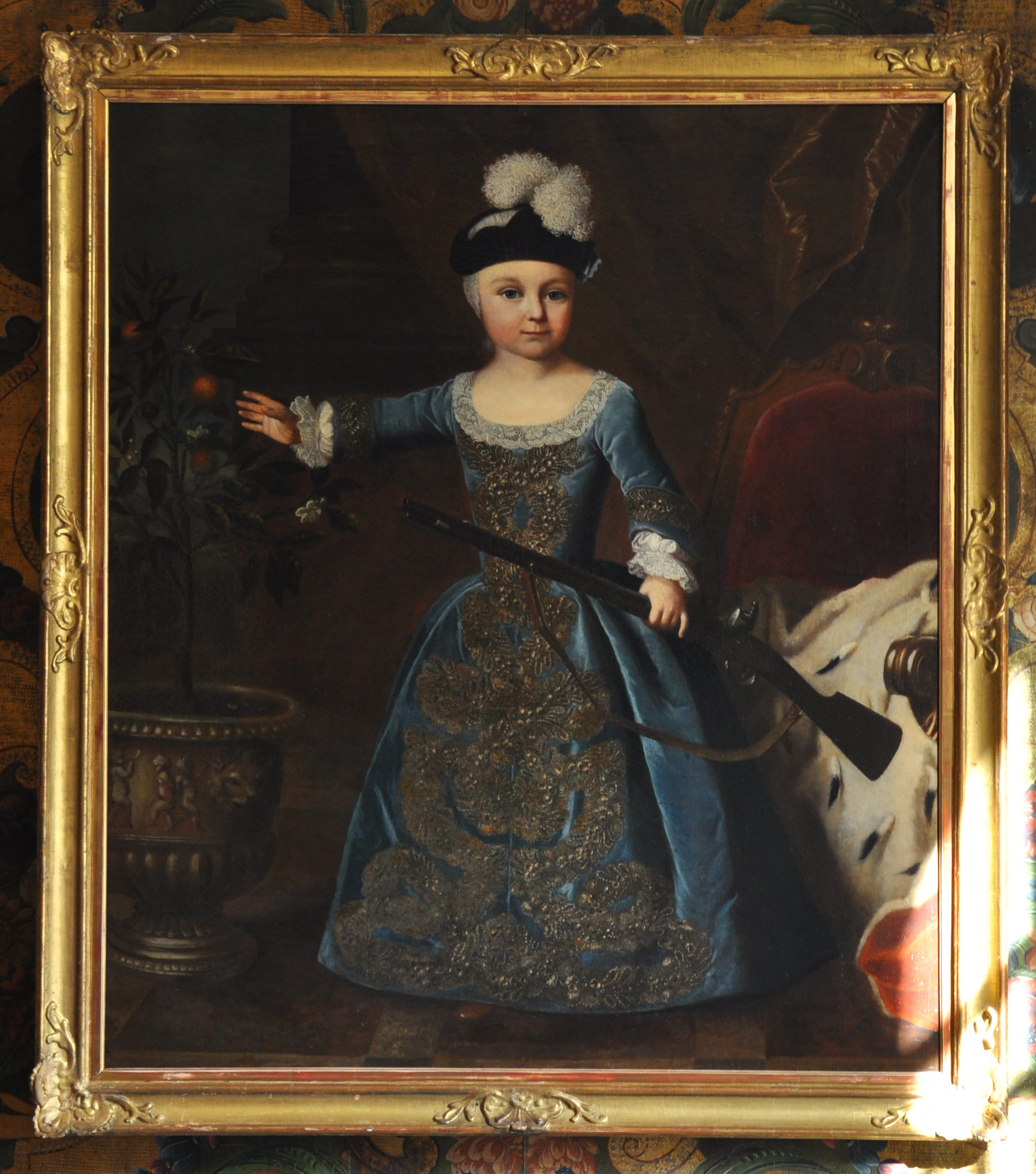
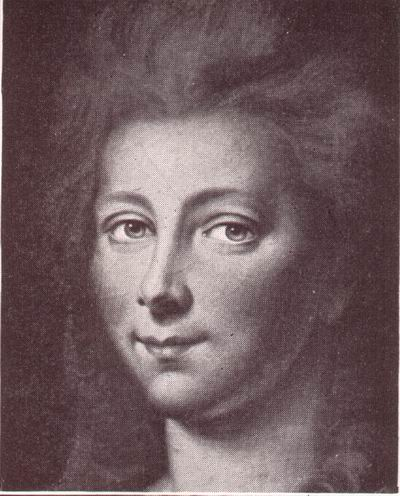
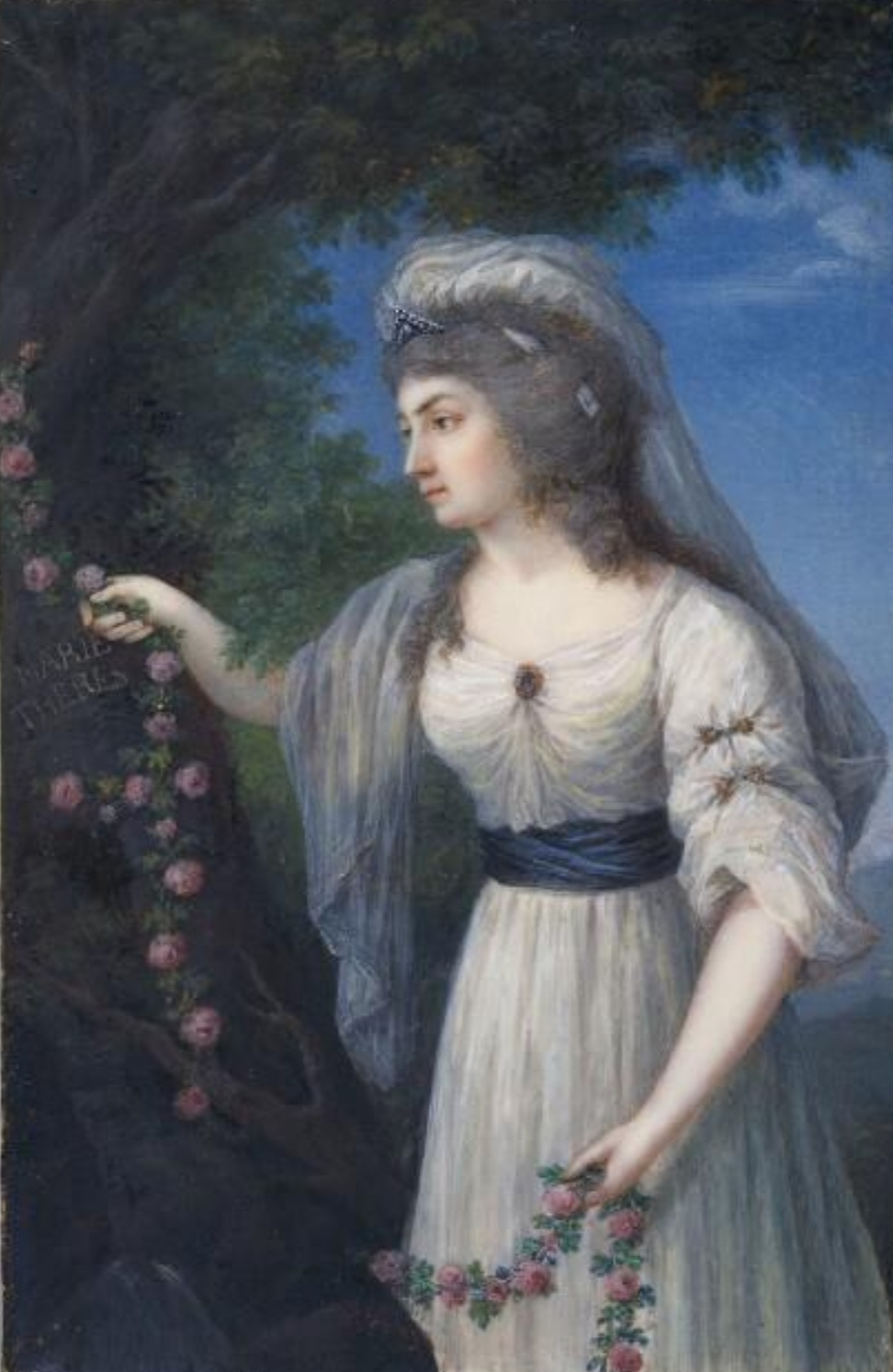
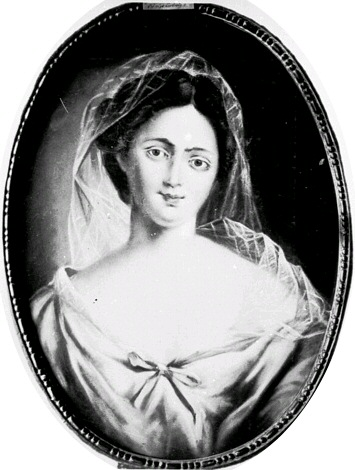
Name	Portrait	Birth	Death	Notes
Ludwig Georg Karl		1749	1823	Married morganatically in 1788 Friederike Schmidt, Baroness von Hessenheim
Georg Friedrich		15 June 1750 - 2 July 1750		died young
Friederike Caroline; Duchess of Mecklenburg-Strelitz		20 August 1752	22 May 1782	Married in 1768 Charles II, Grand Duke of Mecklenburg-Strelitz, had issue
Georg Karl		14 June 1754	28 January 1830	Never married and had no issue
Charlotte Wilhelmine; Duchess of Mecklenburg-Strelitz		5 November 1755	12 December 1785	Married in 1784 Charles II, Grand Duke of Mecklenburg-Strelitz, had issue
Karl Wilhelm Georg		16 May 1757	15 August 1797	Never married and had no issue
Friedrich Georg August		21 July 1759	19 May 1808	Married morganatically in 1788 Karoline Luise Seitz, Baroness von Friedrich, no issue
Louise Henriette Caroline		15 February 1761	24 October 1829	Married in 1777 Louis X of Hesse-Darmstadt, had issue
Auguste Wilhelmine; Duchess of Zweibrücken		14 April 1765	30 March 1796	Married in 1785 the future King Maximilian I of Bavaria, had issue

== Ancestry ==
Ancestors of Prince George William of Hesse-Darmstadt

8. Louis VI, Landgrave of Hesse-Darmstadt
4. Ernest Louis, Landgrave of Hesse-Darmstadt
9. Princess Elisabeth Dorothea of Saxe-Gotha-Altenburg
2. Louis VIII, Landgrave of Hesse-Darmstadt
10. Albert II, Margrave of Brandenburg-Ansbach
5. Princess Dorothea Charlotte of Brandenburg-Ansbach
11. Countess Sophie Margarete of Oettingen-Oettingen
1. Prince George William of Hesse-Darmstadt
12. Johann Reinhard II, Count of Hanau-Lichtenberg
6. Johann Reinhard III, Count of Hanau-Lichtenberg
13. Countess Palatine Anna Magdalena of Birkenfeld-Bischweiler
3. Countess Charlotte of Hanau-Lichtenberg
14. John Frederick, Margrave of Brandenburg-Ansbach
7. Princess Dorothea Friederike of Brandenburg-Ansbach
15. Princess Johanna Elisabeth of Baden-Durlach

== Sources ==
=== Bibliography ===
- Schannat, Johann Friedrich (1824). Eiflia illustrata oder geographische und historische Beschreibung der Eifel (in German) (1 ed.). Don Georg Bärsch.
- Walther, Philipp Alexander Ferdinand (1865). Darmstadt wie es war und wie es geworden (in German). Jonghans.
