= Countess Maria Louise Albertine of Leiningen-Dagsburg-Falkenburg =

Princess George William of Hesse-Darmstadt (1729–1818)

Countess Maria
- Princess George William of Hesse-Darmstadt
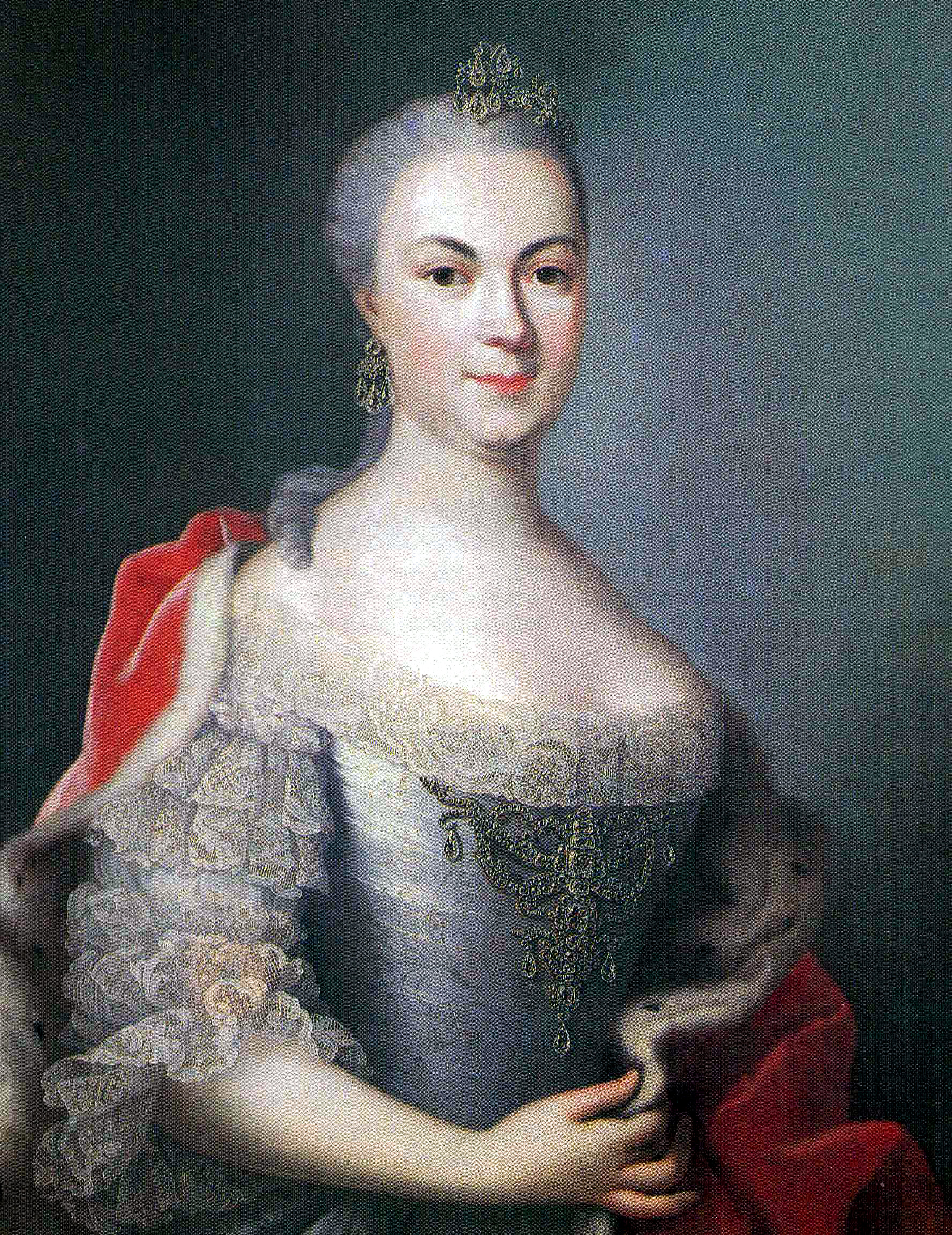
- Marie Louise Albertine of Hesse-Darmstadt in a painting around 1753 by Johann Christian Fiedler
- Born: 16 March 1729; Obrigheim, Electorate of the Palatinate, Holy Roman Empire
- Died: 11 March 1818 (aged 88); Neustrelitz, Grand Duchy of Mecklenburg-Strelitz, German Confederation
- Spouse: Prince George William of Hesse-Darmstadt (m. 1748; died 1782)
- Issue: Prince Louis Georg; Prince Georg Friedrich; Friederike, Duchess Charles Louis of Mecklenburg-Strelitz; Prince George Charles; Charlotte, Duchess Charles Louis of Mecklenburg-Strelitz; Prince Karl Wilhelm; Prince Friedrich Georg; Louise, Grand Duchess of Hesse and by Rhine; Augusta Wilhelmine, Duchess of Zweibrücken
- House: Leiningen
- Father: Christian Karl Reinhard of Leiningen-Dagsburg-Falkenburg
- Mother: Katharina Polyxena of Solms-Rödelheim und Assenheim

Countess Maria Louise Albertine of Leiningen-Dagsburg-Falkenburg (16 March 1729 – 11 March 1818); also known as Princess George, was heiress to the barony of Broich and by marriage Princess of Hesse-Darmstadt. She was the grandmother and educator of Princess Louise of Mecklenburg-Strelitz, who later became Queen consort of Prussia.

== Life ==
Countess Maria Louise Albertine was a daughter of Count Christian Karl Reinhard of Leiningen-Dagsburg-Falkenburg (1695–1766) and his wife, Countess Katharina Polyxena of Solms-Rödelheim und Assenheim (1702–1765). After the death of her father, she was heiress to the barony of Broich and began with the architect Nicolas de Pigage, the restoration and expansion of the Castle Broich. In 1806, the government of Broich was dissolved by Napoleon and in 1815 Broich was annexed by Prussia.

On 16 March 1748, she married Prince George William of Hesse-Darmstadt, the brother of the reigning Landgrave Louis IX of Hesse-Darmstadt in Heidesheim am Rhein. As Louis IX stayed almost exclusively in Pirmasens, she felt obliged, after the death of his wife in 1774, to represent the territory in the capital Darmstadt.

Her daughters Friederike and Charlotte were the first and second wives of Duke Charles II of Mecklenburg-Strelitz. They both died in childbirth. Charles then ended his service as governor-general in Hannover and moved with his children to his wives' mother in Darmstadt. Princess George was a widow since 1782 and took over the education and care of Charles's children.

Charlotte did not move with her father to Darmstadt. At the age of 16, she had been married to the Duke of Saxe-Hildburghausen. His father visited his two sons frequently and moved to Hildburghausen with his oldest daughter in 1787, after he became president of the local imperial debit commission. Thus, Maria Luise cared primarily for Louise and her sisters Therese and Friederike for whom she provided a secure and largely informal home in the "Old Palace" at the market square in Darmstadt. She employed regional educational methods.

In 1790 she traveled with Louise, Frederica and George to Frankfurt to see the coronation of Emperor Leopold II. She stayed here with Catharina Elisabeth Goethe. In 1791, she joined an educational trip to the Netherlands. In 1792 she fled from the advancing French army and took the children from Darmstadt to her granddaughter Charlotte in Hildburghausen, where she remained until March 1793. On the return trip to Darmstadt, she traveled via Frankfurt, where a meeting between Louise and her future husband Frederick William III of Prussia had been arranged. In 1793 she accompanied Louise and Frederica to their wedding in Berlin.

Maria Louise was described as warm hearted and cheerful usually speaking the Palatinate dialect. At the time of her death, she had 15 great great grandchildren.

== Death ==
Maria Louise Albertine died 11 March 1818, aged 88, in Neustrelitz, Grand Duchy of Mecklenburg-Strelitz, German Confederation. Her body was buried in Mirow, on Mecklenburg-Strelitz family estate.

== Issue ==
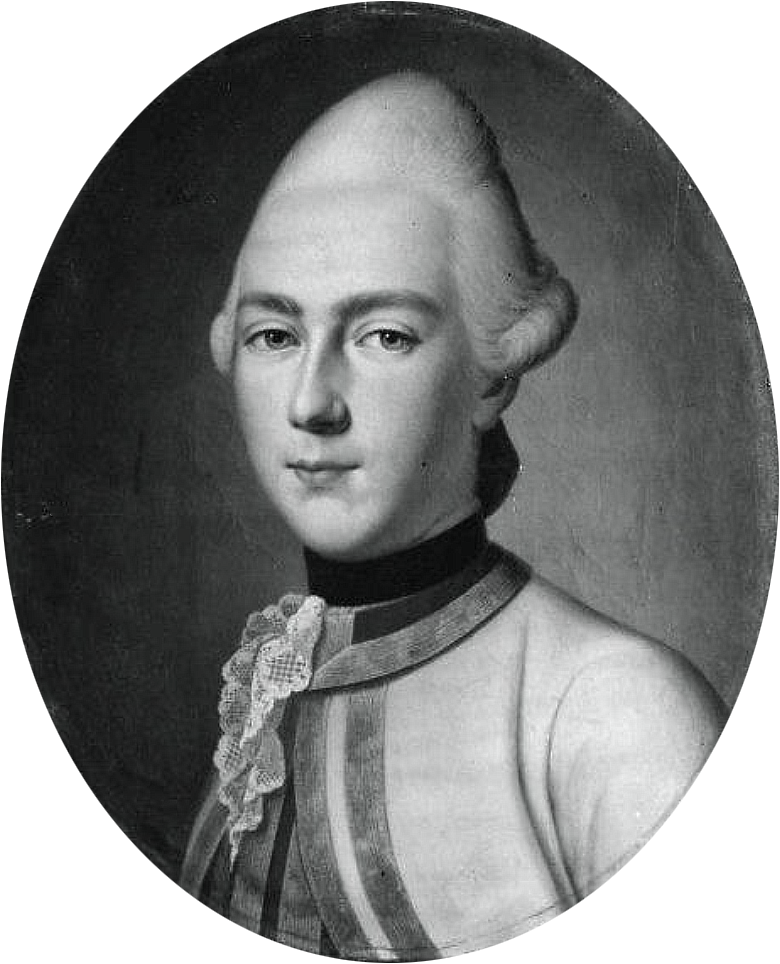
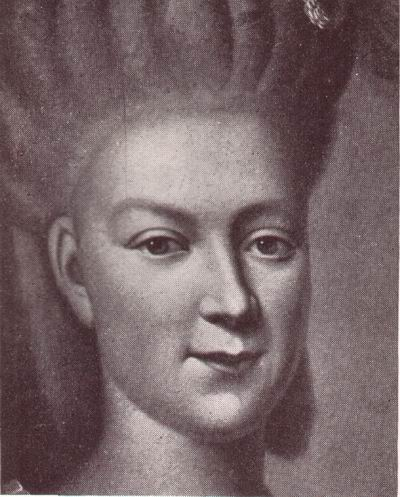
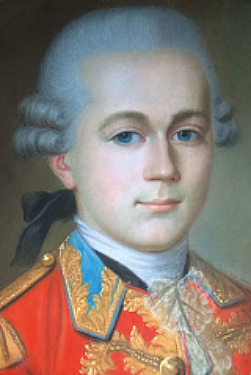
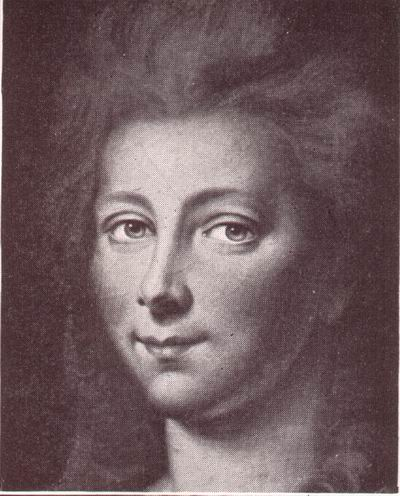
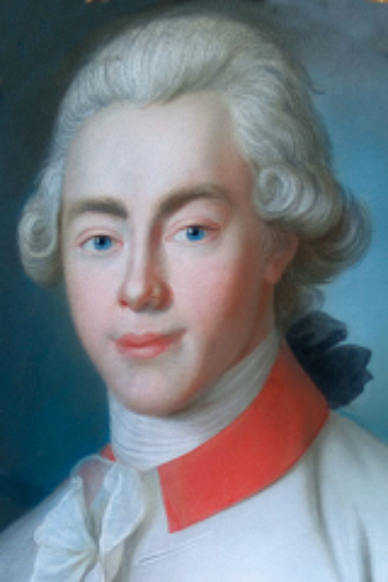
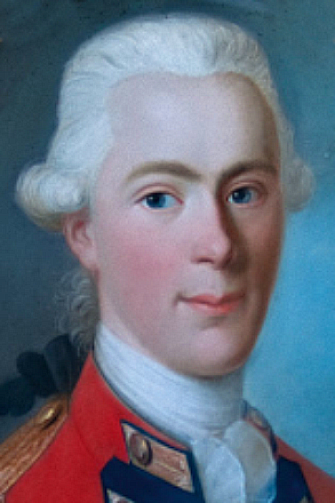
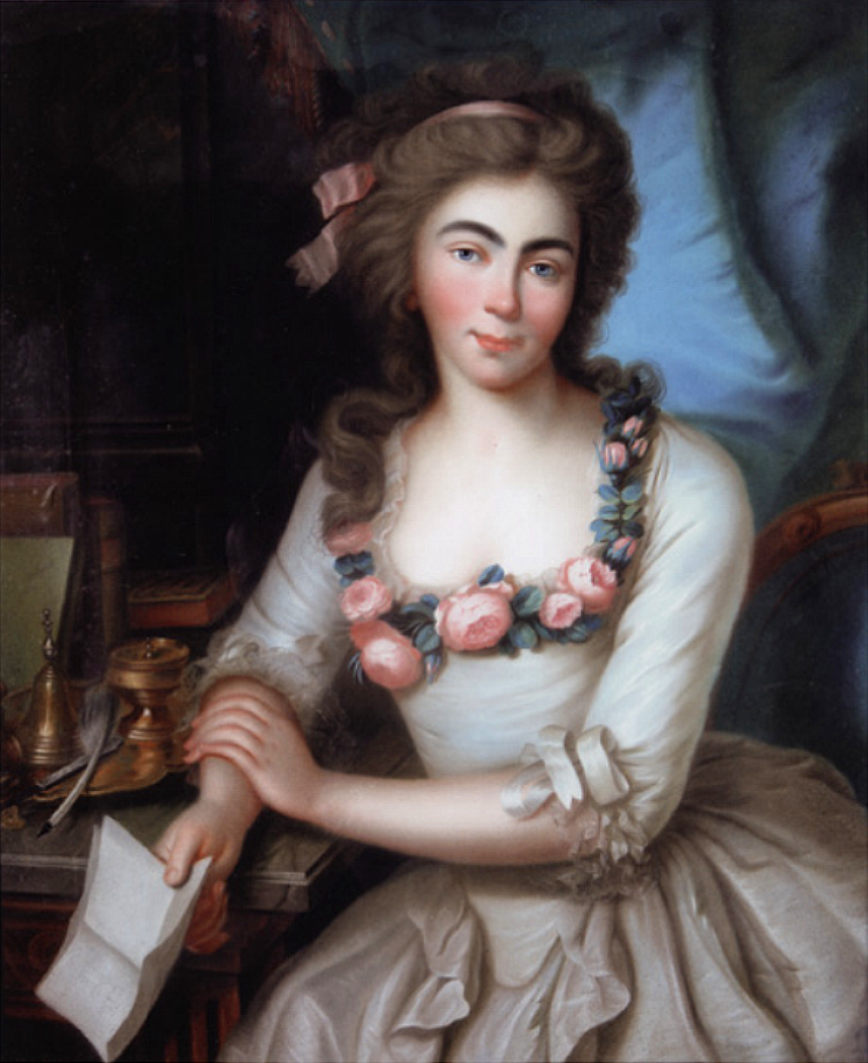
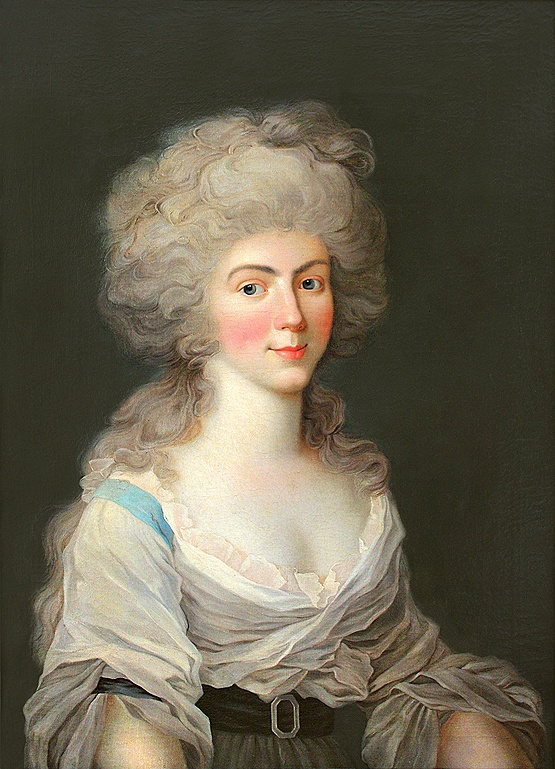
Name	Portrait	Birth	Death	Notes
Ludwig Georg Karl		1749	1823	Married morganatically in 1788 Friederike Schmidt, Baroness von Hessenheim
Georg Friedrich		1750
Friederike Caroline; Duchess of Mecklenburg-Strelitz		20 August 1752	22 May 1782	Married in 1768 Duke Charles of Mecklenburg-Strelitz, had issue
Georg Karl		14 June 1754	28 January 1830
Charlotte Wilhelmine; Duchess of Mecklenburg-Strelitz		5 November 1755	12 December 1785	Married in 1784 Duke Charles of Mecklenburg-Strelitz, had issue
Karl Wilhelm Georg		1757	1797
Friedrich Georg August		1759	1808	Married morganatically in 1788 Karoline Luise Seitz, Baroness von Friedrich
Louise Henriette Caroline		15 February 1761	24 October 1829	Married in 1777 Louis X of Hesse-Darmstadt, had issue
Auguste Wilhelmine; Duchess of Zweibrücken		14 April 1765	30 March 1796	Married in 1785 the future King Maximilian I of Bavaria, had issue

== Ancestry ==
Ancestors of Countess Maria Louise Albertine of Leiningen-Dagsburg-Falkenburg

8. Count Georg Wilhelm of Leiningen-Dagsburg-Falkenburg
4. Johann, Count of Leiningen-Dagsburg-Falkenburg
9. Countess Anna Elisabeth of Daun-Falkenstein
2. Count Christian Karl Reinhard of Leiningen-Dagsburg-Falkenburg
10. Johann Reinhard II, Count of Hanau-Lichtenberg
5. Countess Johanna Magdalene of Hanau-Lichtenberg
11. Countess Palatine Anna Magdalena of Birkenfeld-Bischweiler
1. Countess Maria Louise Albertine of Leiningen-Dagsburg-Falkenburg
12. Johann August, Count of Solms-Rödelheim
6. Count Georg Ludwig of Solms-Rödelheim
13. Countess Eleonore Cratz of Scharffenstein
3. Countess Katharina Polyxena of Solms-Rödelheim
14. Count Friedrich of Ahlefeldt
7. Countess Charlotte Sibylle of Ahlefeldt
15. Countess Marie Elisabeth of Leiningen-Dagsburg-Hartenburg
