= Countess Charlotte of Hanau-Lichtenberg =

Charlotte of Hanau-Lichtenberg
- Hereditary Princess of Hesse-Darmstadt
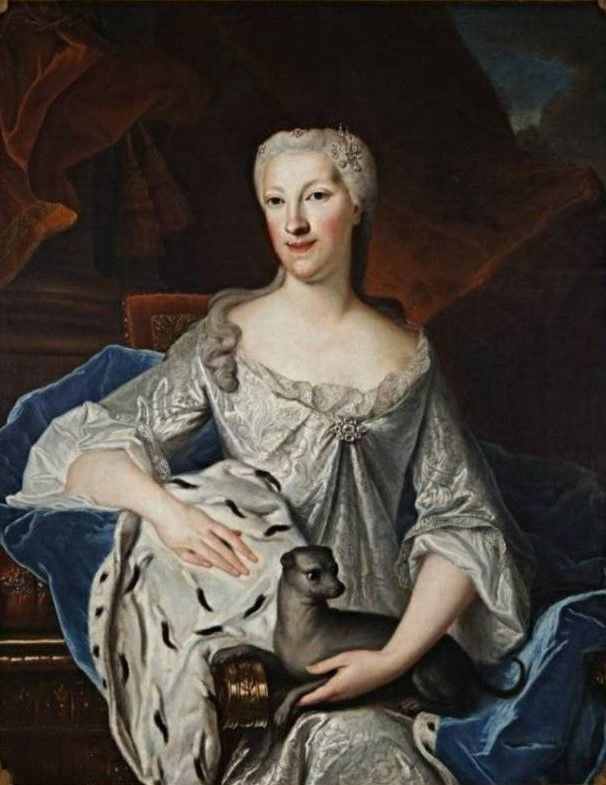
- Princess Charlotte c. 1725
- Born: 2 May 1700; Bouxwiller
- Died: 1 July 1726 (aged 26); Darmstadt
- Burial: Stadtkirche Darmstadt
- Spouse: Louis, Hereditary Prince of Hesse-Darmstadt (m. 1717)
- Issue: Louis IX, Landgrave of Hesse-Darmstadt; Prince George William; Caroline Louise, Margravine of Baden
- House: Hanau (by birth); Hesse-Darmstadt (by marriage)
- Father: Johann Reinhard III, Count of Hanau-Lichtenberg
- Mother: Princess Dorothea Friederike of Brandenburg-Ansbach

Countess Charlotte of Hanau-Lichtenberg, full name: Countess Charlotte Christine Magdalene Johanna of Hanau-Lichtenberg (2 May 1700, Bouxwiller – 1 July 1726, Darmstadt) was the wife of landgrave Louis VIII of Hesse-Darmstadt.

== Biography ==
=== The Heiress ===
Charlotte was the only surviving child of the last Count of Hanau, Johann Reinhard III, and the Countess Dorothea Friederike of Brandenburg-Ansbach. Thus, she was the sole heir of the County of Hanau.

=== Marriage ===
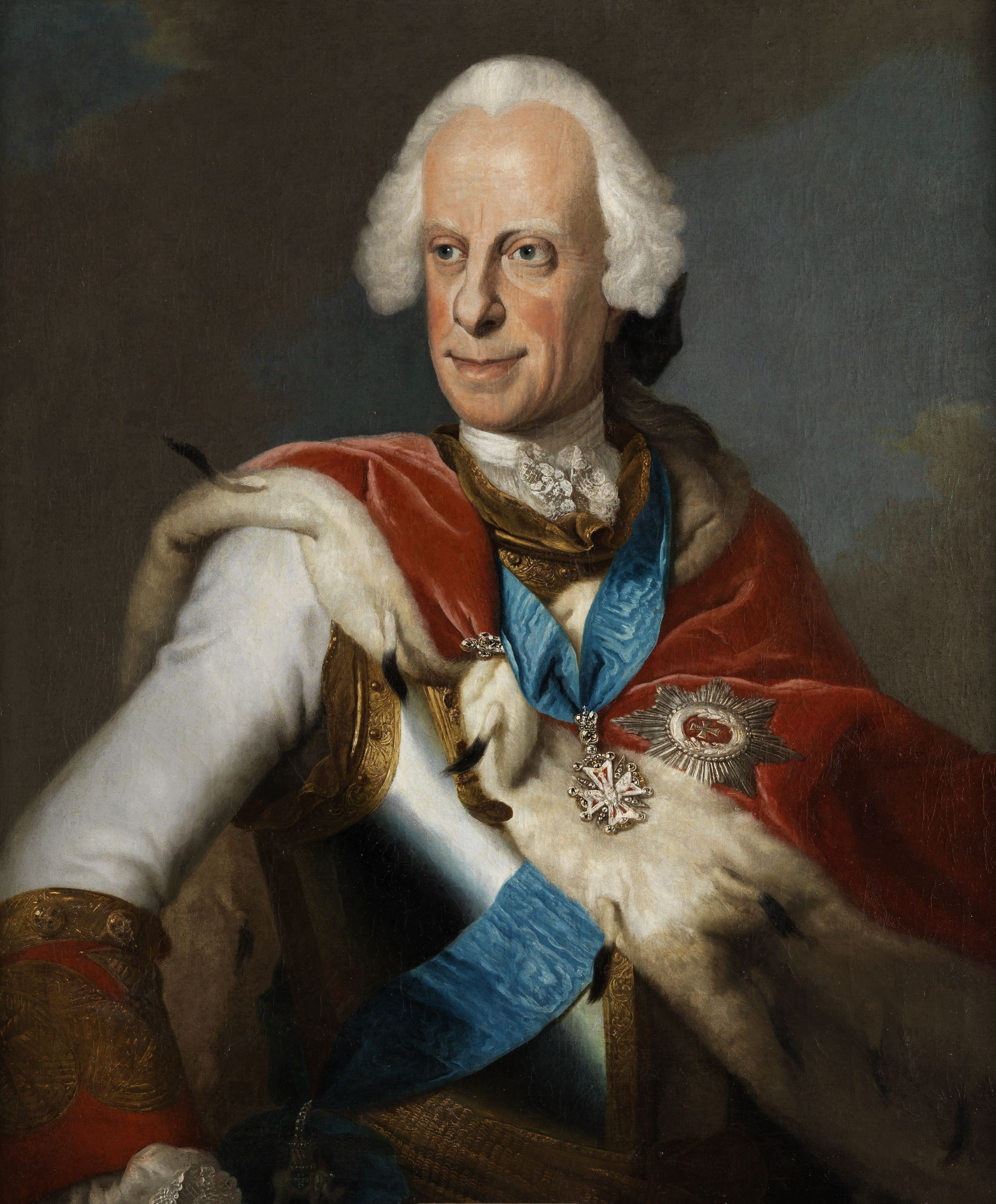
Her husband: Landgrave Louis VIII

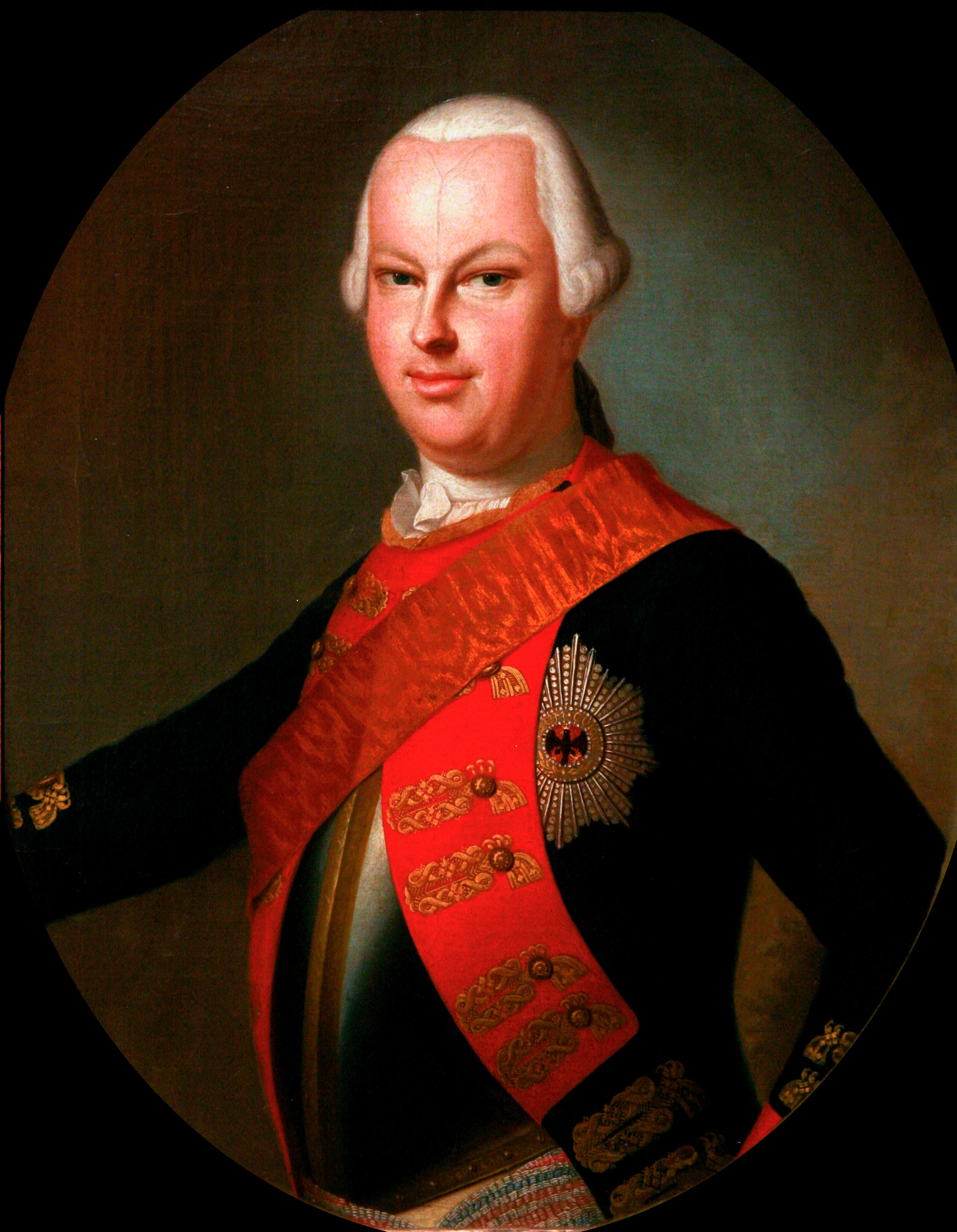
Her son, Louis IX

The first man to ask her hand in marriage, was the crown prince and later Landgrave William VIII of Hesse-Kassel. Had this marriage taken place, the county of Hanau would have remained united. However, it failed because of religious differences between William, who was a Calvinist and Charlotte, who was Lutheran.

The second candidate was her mother's paternal first cousin, the crown prince and later Landgrave Louis VIII of Hesse-Darmstadt, who was Lutheran. They were married on 5 April 1717. From this marriage the following children were born:

- Landgrave Louis IX, married in 1741 Countess Palatine Caroline of Zweibrücken, had issue
- Prince George William, married in 1748 Countess Maria Louise Albertine of Leiningen-Dagsburg-Falkenburg, had issue
- Princess Caroline Louise; married in 1751 Charles Frederick, Margrave of Baden, later first Grand Duke of Baden, had issue

=== Death ===
Charlotte Christine died on 1 July 1726 in Darmstadt. A number of funeral sermons were published in July 1726 in Darmstadt.

=== The inheritance ===
As Charlotte Christine died before her father, her son, the future Landgrave Louis IX, became heir apparent of the County of Hanau. This was, however, restricted to the Lichtenberg part of the county, because the Münzenberg part of the county had been awarded to the county of Hesse-Kassel in an earlier inheritance contract between Hanau and Hesse-Kassel.

A dispute arose, because it wasn't clear to which part the district of Babenhausen would belong. It escalated into a military conflict. Hesse-Darmstadt occupied Dietzenbach, Schaafheim and Schlierbach; Hesse-Kassel occupied the rest of the district of Babenhausen, deploying troops that had already been stationed in Hanau.

The dispute could be settled only after protracted litigation before the highest courts of the Empire, which in 1771 issued the so-called Partifikationsrezess. The towns of Altheim, Dietzenbach, Harpertshausen, Schaafheim and Schlierbach were awarded to Hesse-Darmstadt and were incorporated into the district Schaafheim.

== Ancestors ==
Ancestors of Countess Charlotte of Hanau-Lichtenberg

8. Philip Wolfgang of Hanau-Lichtenberg
4. Johann Reinhard II
9. Johanna of Oettingen-Oettingen
2. Johann Reinhard III
10. Christian I, Count Palatine of Birkenfeld-Bischweiler
5. Countess Palatine Anna Magdalena of Birkenfeld-Bischweiler
11. Magdalena Catherine of Zweibrücken
1. Charlotte Christine Magdalene Johanna of Hanau-Lichtenberg
12. Albert II, Margrave of Brandenburg-Ansbach
6. John Frederick, Margrave of Brandenburg-Ansbach
13. Sophie Margarete of Oettingen-Oettingen
3. Dorothea Friederike of Brandenburg-Ansbach
14. Frederick VI, Margrave of Baden-Durlach
7. Johanna Elisabeth of Baden-Durlach
15. Christina Magdalena of the Palatinate-Zweibrücken
