= Christian Karl Reinhard of Leiningen-Dagsburg-Falkenburg =

German nobleman (1695–1766)

Count Christian Karl Reinhard
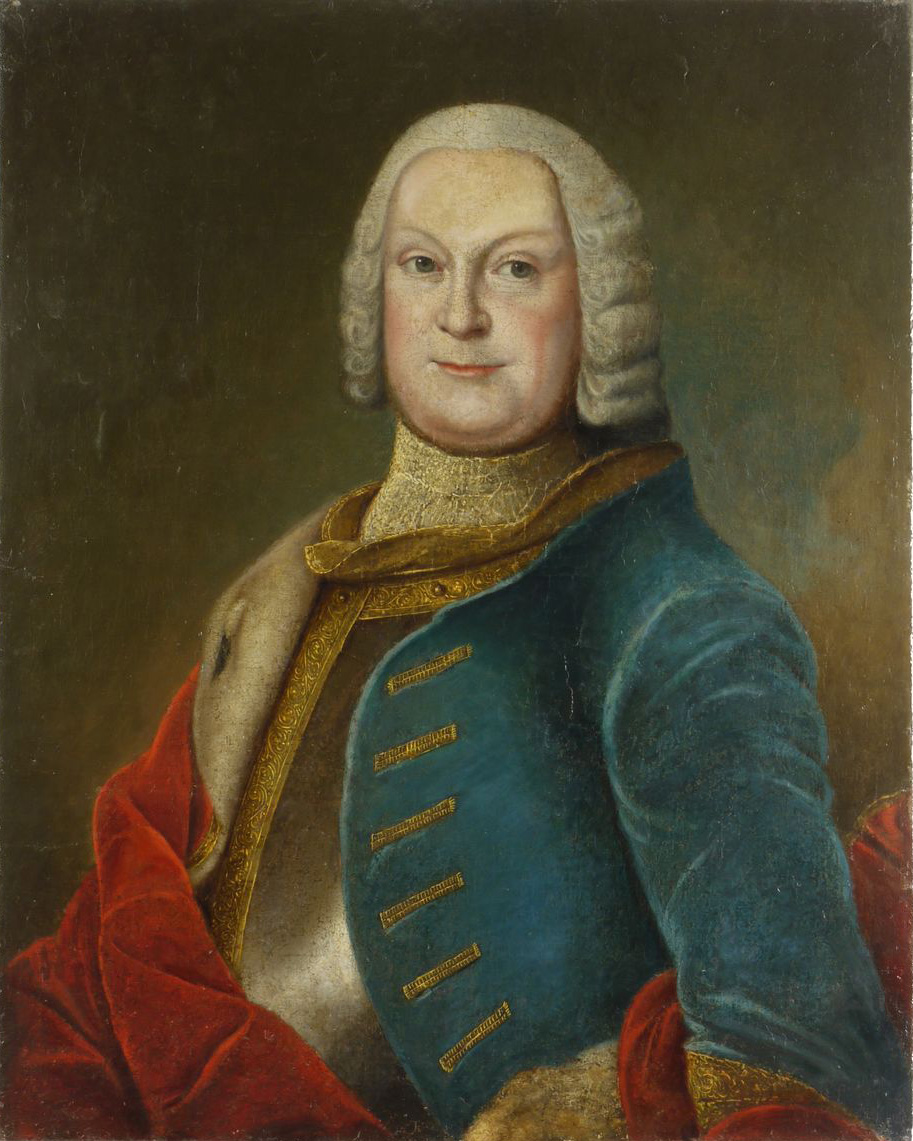
- Portrait by unknown, mid-18th century
- Born: 17 July 1695; Castle Broich, Broich, Mülheim an der Ruhr
- Died: 17 November 1766 (aged 71); Heidesheim
- Noble family: Leiningen
- Spouse: Katharina Polyxena of Solms-Rödelheim
- Issue: Maria Louise Albertine, Princess George William of Hesse-Darmstadt; Caroline Felizitas, Princess of Nassau-Usingen
- Father: John, Count of Leiningen-Dagsburg-Falkenburg
- Mother: Countess Johanna Magdalene of Hanau-Lichtenberg

Count Christian Karl Reinhard of Leiningen-Dagsburg-Falkenburg (17 July 1695, Mülheim an der Ruhr – 17 November 1766, Heidesheim am Rhein) was a German nobleman.

== Life ==
Christian Karl Reinhard was the son of John, Count of Leiningen-Dagsburg-Falkenburg, and his wife, Countess Johanna Magdalene of Hanau-Lichtenberg.

After the early death of the father's Christian guardian, Count Council and Commissioner John Arnold Kielmann, he was invested in June 1701, by Elector Palatine Johann Wilhelm with the Lordship of Broich. His family soon left because of the threat of the War of the Spanish Succession to Schloss Broich.

== Marriage and children ==
Christian Karl Reinhard married on 27 November 1726 in Mettenheim, to Countess Katharina Polyxena of Solms-Rödelheim, and had the following children:

- Johann Karl Ludwig of Leiningen-Dagsburg-Falkenburg (6 October 1727, Heidenheim – 20 March 1734)
- Countess Maria Louise Albertine of Leiningen-Dagsburg-Falkenburg (16 March 1729, Heidenheim – 11 March 1818, Neustrelitz); married on 16 March 1748 Prince George William of Hesse-Darmstadt (11 July 1722 – 21 June 1782)
- Countess Polyxene Wilhelmine of Leiningen-Dagsburg-Falkenburg (8 August 1730, Castle Heidenheim – 21 March 1800); married on 27 March 1752, Count Ludwig Emich of Leiningen (22 December 1709 – 23 September 1766)
- Countess Sophie Charlotte Franziska of Leiningen-Dagsburg-Falkenburg (28 October 1731, Castle Heidenheim – 20 January 1781)
- Countess Alexandrine of Leiningen-Dagsburg-Falkenburg (25 November 1732, Frankfurt am Main – 4 October 1809); married on 25 October 1770 in Frankfurt am Main, Heinrich XI, Prince Reuss of Greiz (18 March 1722 – 28 June 1800)
- Countess Caroline Felizitas of Leiningen-Dagsburg-Falkenburg (22 May 1734, Heidenheim – 8 May 1810, Frankfurt am Main); married 16 April 1760, Charles William, Prince of Nassau-Usingen (9 November 1735 – 17 May 1803) and had issue.

== Ancestry ==
Ancestors of Christian Karl Reinhard of Leiningen-Dagsburg-Falkenburg

8. Emich XIII, Count of Leiningen-Dagsburg-Falkenburg
4. Count Georg Wilhelm of Leiningen-Dagsburg-Falkenburg
9. Countess Christiane of Solms-Laubach
2. Johann, Count of Leiningen-Dagsburg-Falkenburg
10. Wilhelm Wirich, Count of Daun-Falkenstein
5. Countess Anna Elisabeth of Daun-Falkenstein
11. Countess Elisabeth of Waldeck-Wildungen
1. Count Christian Karl Reinhard of Leiningen-Dagsburg-Falkenburg
12. Philipp Wolfgang, Count of Hanau-Lichtenberg
6. Johann Reinhard II, Count of Hanau-Lichtenberg
13. Countess Johanna of Oettingen-Oettingen
3. Countess Johanna Magdalene of Hanau-Lichtenberg
14. Christian I, Count Palatine of Birkenfeld-Bischweiler
7. Countess Palatine Anna Magdalena of Birkenfeld-Bischweiler
15. Countess Palatine Magdalene Catherine of Zweibrücken
