= Louis VIII of Hesse-Darmstadt =

Louis VIII
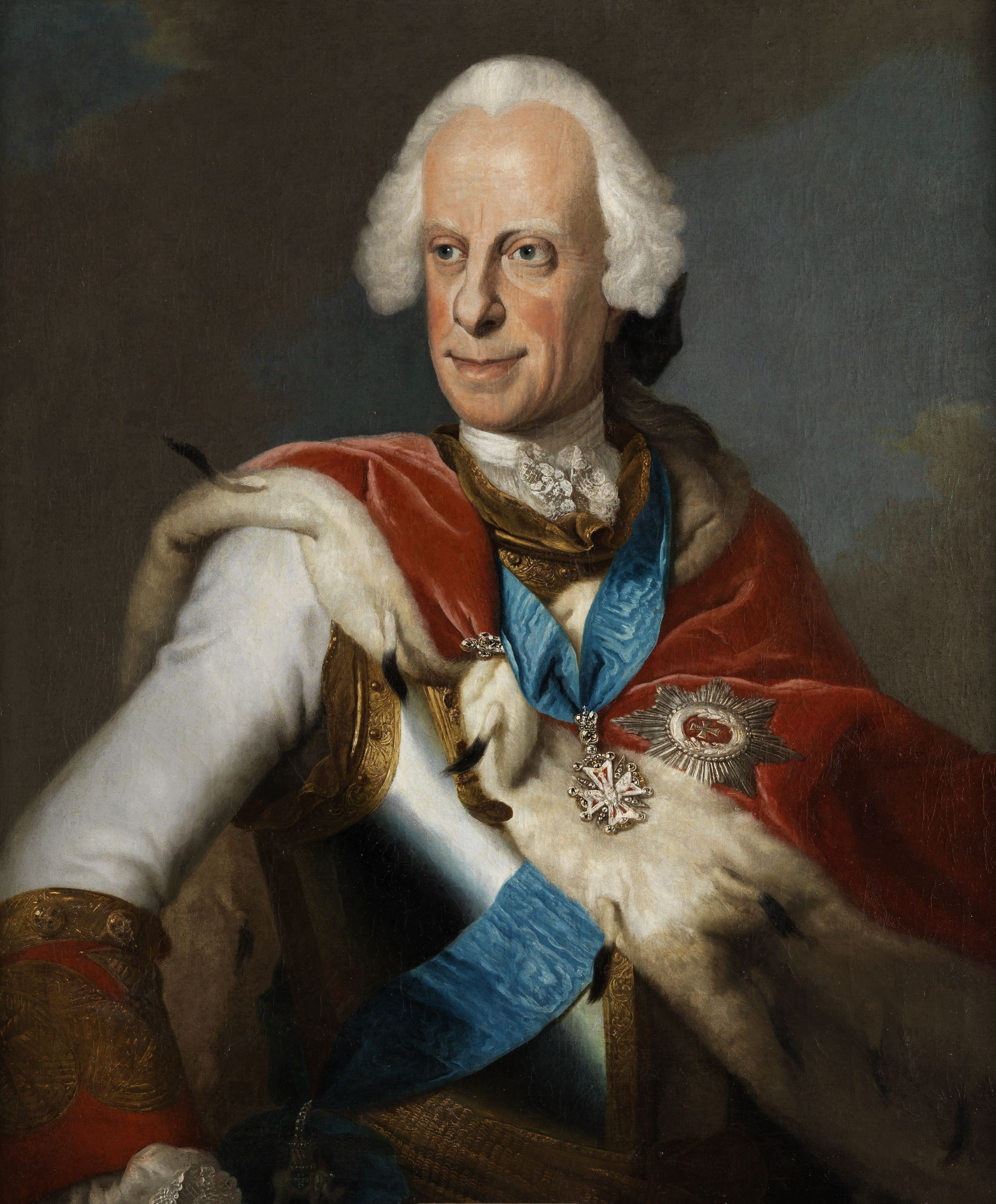
- Portrait by Johann Christian Fiedler

Landgrave of Hesse-Darmstadt
- Reign: 12 September 1739 – 17 October 1768
- Predecessor: Ernest Louis
- Successor: Louis IX
- Born: 5 April 1691; Darmstadt
- Died: 17 October 1768 (aged 77); Darmstadt
- Burial: Stadtkirche Darmstadt
- Spouse: Countess Charlotte of Hanau-Lichtenberg (m. 1717; died 1726)
- Issue: Louis IX, Landgrave of Hesse-Darmstadt; Prince George William; Caroline Louise, Margravine of Baden
- House: Hesse-Darmstadt
- Father: Ernest Louis, Landgrave of Hesse-Darmstadt
- Mother: Dorothea Charlotte of Brandenburg-Ansbach

Louis VIII (German: Ludwig; 5 April 1691 – 17 October 1768) was the Landgrave of Hesse-Darmstadt from 1739 to 1768. He was the son of Ernest Louis, Landgrave of Hesse-Darmstadt and Margravine Dorothea Charlotte of Brandenburg-Ansbach.

== Life ==
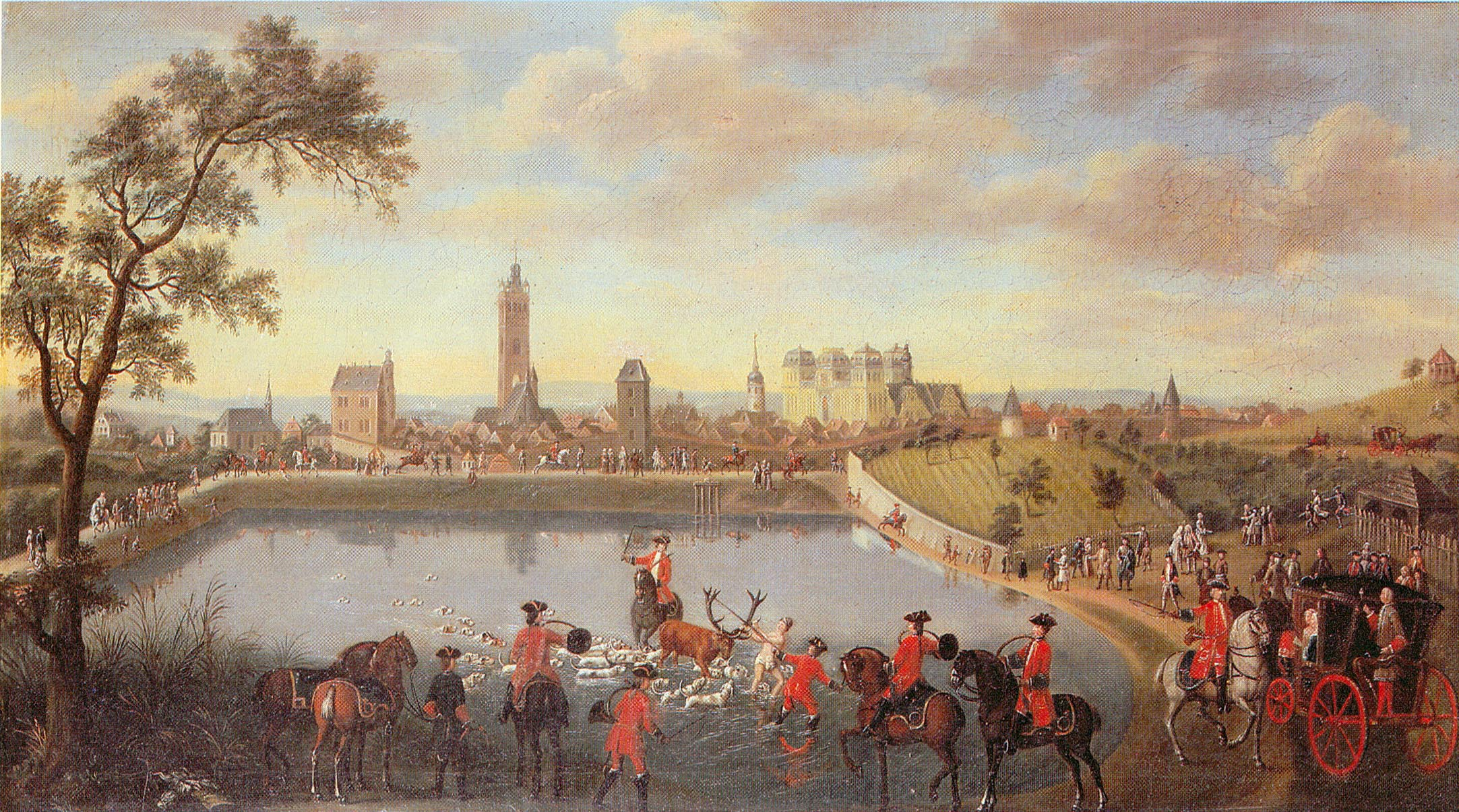
A deer hunt near Darmstadt. Painting by Georg Adam Eger 1755

In 1717, he was married to his maternal first cousin's daughter, Countess Charlotte Christine of Hanau-Lichtenberg and he received Hanau-Lichtenberg as an addition to his dominions. His mistress was Helena Martini. Because of his passion for hunting, he is known as the "Hunting Landgrave" (German: Jagdlandgraf). During the Seven Years' War he stood on the side of the Emperor and received the rank of General Field Marshal.

Like his father, Louis was not a gifted economist and only his good relationship with Empress Maria Theresa and her intervention at the Imperial Court Council kept the Landgraviate from bankruptcy. However, his caring for his country is documented by the establishment of a textile house in 1742 and a state orphanage in the 1746.

== Issue ==
Children:

- Landgrave Louis IX, married in 1741 Countess Palatine Caroline of Zweibrücken, had issue
- Prince George William, married in 1748 Countess Maria Louise Albertine of Leiningen-Dagsburg-Falkenburg, had issue
- Princess Caroline Louise; married in 1751 Charles Frederick, Margrave of Baden, later first Grand Duke of Baden, had issue

== Ancestors ==
Ancestors of Louis VIII of Hesse-Darmstadt

8. George II, Landgrave of Hesse-Darmstadt
4. Louis VI, Landgrave of Hesse-Darmstadt
9. Sophia Eleonore of Saxony
2. Ernest Louis, Landgrave of Hesse-Darmstadt
10. Ernest I, Duke of Saxe-Gotha
5. Elisabeth Dorothea of Saxe-Gotha-Altenburg
11. Princess Elisabeth Sophie of Saxe-Altenburg
1. Louis VIII, Landgrave of Hesse-Darmstadt
12. Joachim Ernst, Margrave of Brandenburg-Ansbach
6. Albert II, Margrave of Brandenburg-Ansbach
13. Sophie of Solms-Laubach
3. Dorothea Charlotte of Brandenburg-Ansbach
14. Joachim Ernst of Oettingen-Oettingen
7. Sofie Margarete of Oettingen-Oettingen
15. Anna Sibylle of Solms

== Sources ==
- Die Geschichte Hessens, Gerd Bauer, Heiner Boencke, Hans Sarkowicz; Eichborn, 2002, p. 193-194

Louis VIII of Hesse-Darmstadt House of Hesse Born: 5 April 1691 Died: 17 October 1768
Regnal titles
Preceded by Ernest Louis	Landgrave of Hesse-Darmstadt; 1739–1768	Succeeded by Louis IX
