= Philipp Reinhard, Count of Hanau-Münzenberg =

Philipp Reinhard
- Count of Hanau-Münzenberg
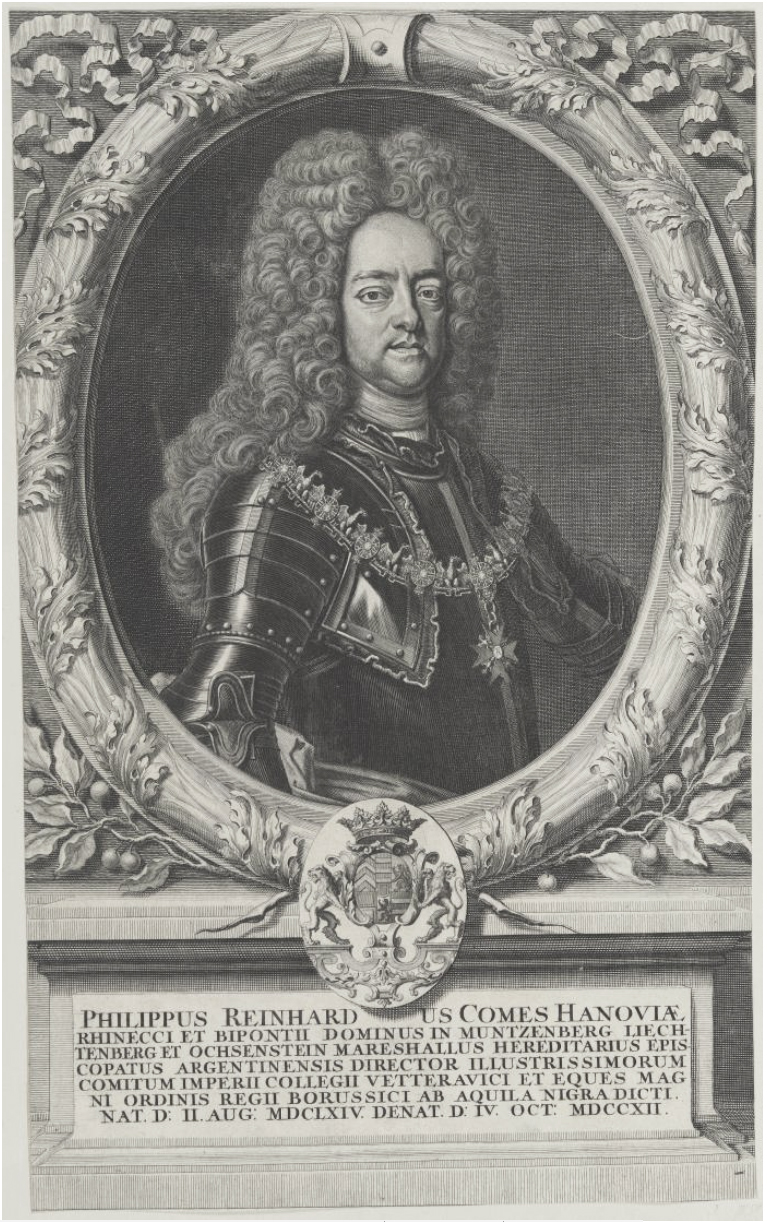
- Engraving of Philip Reinhard, Count of Hanau-Münzenberg
- Born: 2 August 1664; Bischofsheim am hohen Steg
- Died: 4 October 1712 (aged 48); Philippsruhe Castle, Hanau
- Noble family: House of Hanau
- Spouses: Countess Palatine Magdalena Claudia of Zweibrücken-Birkenfeld-Bischweiler; Charlotte Wilhelmine of Saxe-Coburg-Saalfeld
- Father: Johann Reinhard II of Hanau-Lichtenberg
- Mother: Anna Magdalena, Countess Palatine of Zweibrücken-Birkenfeld

Philipp Reinhard of Hanau-Münzenberg (2 August 1664, Bischofsheim am hohen Steg – 4 October 1712, Philippsruhe Castle, Hanau) from 1680 to 1712 in the County of Hanau-Münzenberg.

== Childhood and youth ==
Philipp Reinhard was born in 1664 Bischofsheim am hohen Steg (now Rheinbischofsheim) as a child of Johann Reinhard II of Hanau-Lichtenberg and the Countess Palatine Anna Magdalena of Zweibrücken-Birkenfeld. When his father died in 1666, his mother and his uncle Duke Christian II of Zweibrücken-Birkenfeld (1654–1717) became guardian for him and his younger brother Johann Reinhard III.

He was educated together with his younger brother Johann Reinhard III, initially in Strasbourg. In 1678, they moved to Babenhausen, where their mother lived at the time. In 1678, they started a Grand Tour to the Alsace, Switzerland and Geneva. In 1680, the travelled for a year in Savoy and Turin, in 1681 to Paris, in 1683 to the Netherlands, England and some French provinces. In early 1684, they were in Milan, from there they went to see the carnival in Venice, followed by a trip to Rome (with audiences with Pope Innocent XII and queen Christina of Sweden), then to Naples, Florence, Modena, Parma and Mantua. In 1686, they visited the imperial court in Vienna and on the way back, they traveled to Bohemia and visited the Electoral Saxon court in Dresden.

== Government ==
=== Policy ===
Philipp Reinhard came to the throne of Hanau-Münzenberg at the age of 16 on 3 June [O.S. 24 May] 1680. His uncle Friedrich Casimir had financially ruined the county with his escapades and he was overthrown by his family. They put Philipp Reinhard on the throne, but as he was still a minor, his guardians acted as regents until 1687. His younger brother Johann Reinhard III was put on the throne of Hanau-Lichtenberg, which had also been ruined by Friedrich Casimir. The district of Babenhausen was awarded to Hanau-Münzenberg; this decision was confirmed in a treaty in 1691.

Philipp Reinhard came of age in 1687 and began to rule independently. In 1691, Duke Christian II filed his final report on the guardianship. Philipp Reinhard's reign was marked by a thoughtful territorial and fiscal policy that tried to repair the damage done by the Thirty Years' War and the reign of his predecessor.

==== Foreign policy ====
In 1692, Philipp Reinhard was elected as the permanent director of the Wetterau Association of Imperial Counts.

In 1704, Philipp Reinhard was made a member of the Order of the Black Eagle by King Friedrich I of Prussia. For the investiture, he had to travel to Berlin, which he did in 1710. In 1711, Emperor Karl VI visited Hanau while travelling to Frankfurt for his coronation.

His territorial policies met with little success. The districts Schwarzenfels and Kellerei with Naumburg Castle had been pledged to Hesse-Kassel. He tried to redeem them and failed. He did manage to redeem some smaller territories, notably Konradsdorf monastery. He exchanged some territory with Isenburg, swapping parts of Hain in Dreieich for a share in Dudenhofen. He also bought the Gronauer Court, which formerly belonged to the Ilbenstadt monastery.

==== Domestic policy ====
During his reign, religious refugees migrated into the county, as had happened 100 years earlier during the reign of Count Philipp Ludwig II, especially after Louis XIV had revoked the Edict of Nantes in 1685 and the Waldensians began to be persecuted in Savoy. The refugees were admitted, partly as a humanitarian act and partly to strengthen the county's economic position. The Waldensians only stayed in Hanau temporarily, though.

=== Elevation to the rank of prince ===
In the older literature it is repeatedly claimed that Philipp Reinhard would have obtained the rank of Prince. This appears not to be the case. There is no record of such an elevation, neither in the archives of Hanau, which have since been moved to the Hessian State Archive at Marburg, nor in the Austrian House-, Court- and State Archives in Vienna, nor is there a record of any related payments. It has been documented that Philipp Reinhard spent time and expenses to obtain such a title and that he never used one, which would have been a very strange behaviour if he had received it.

=== Culture ===
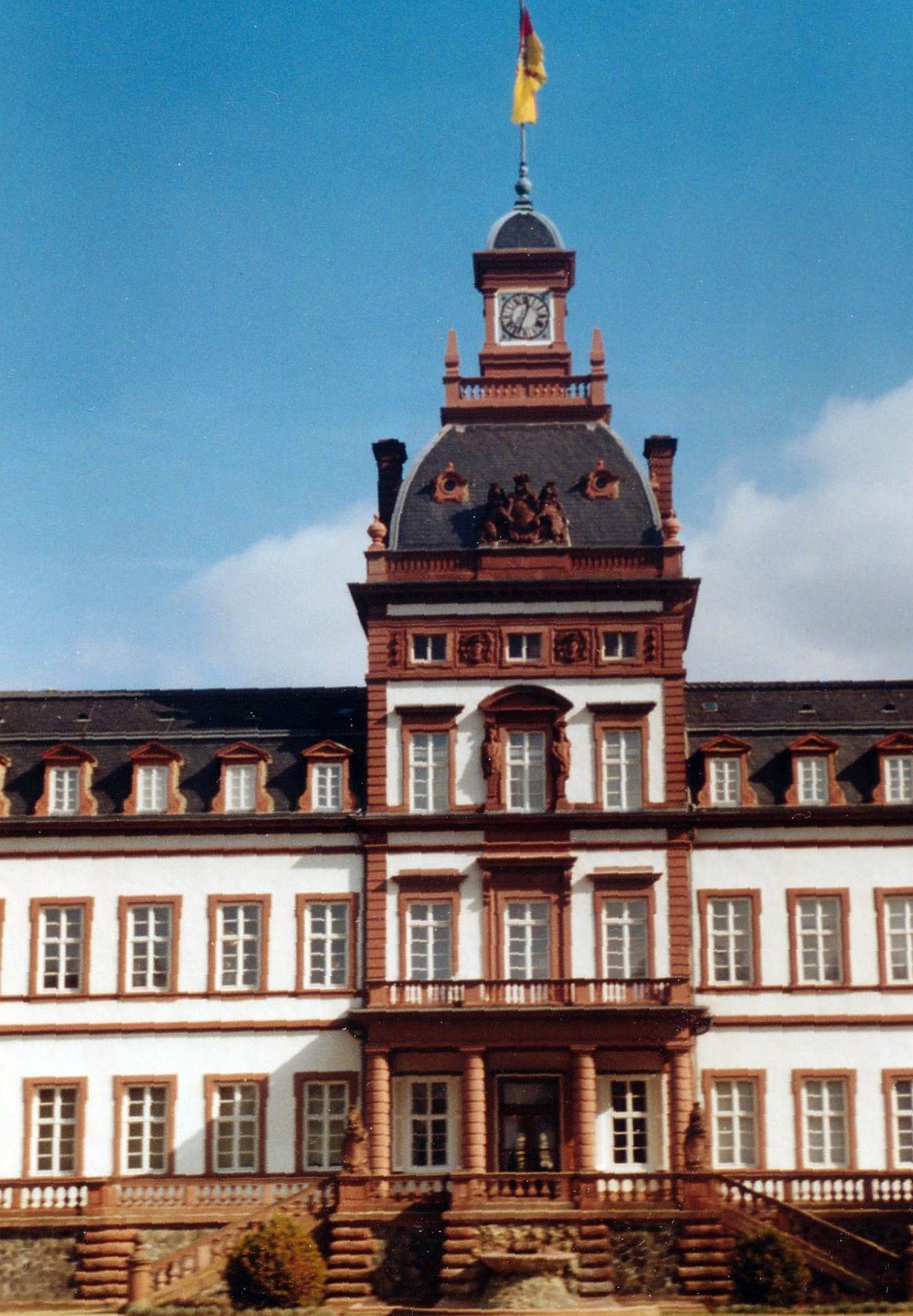
Philippsruhe Castle

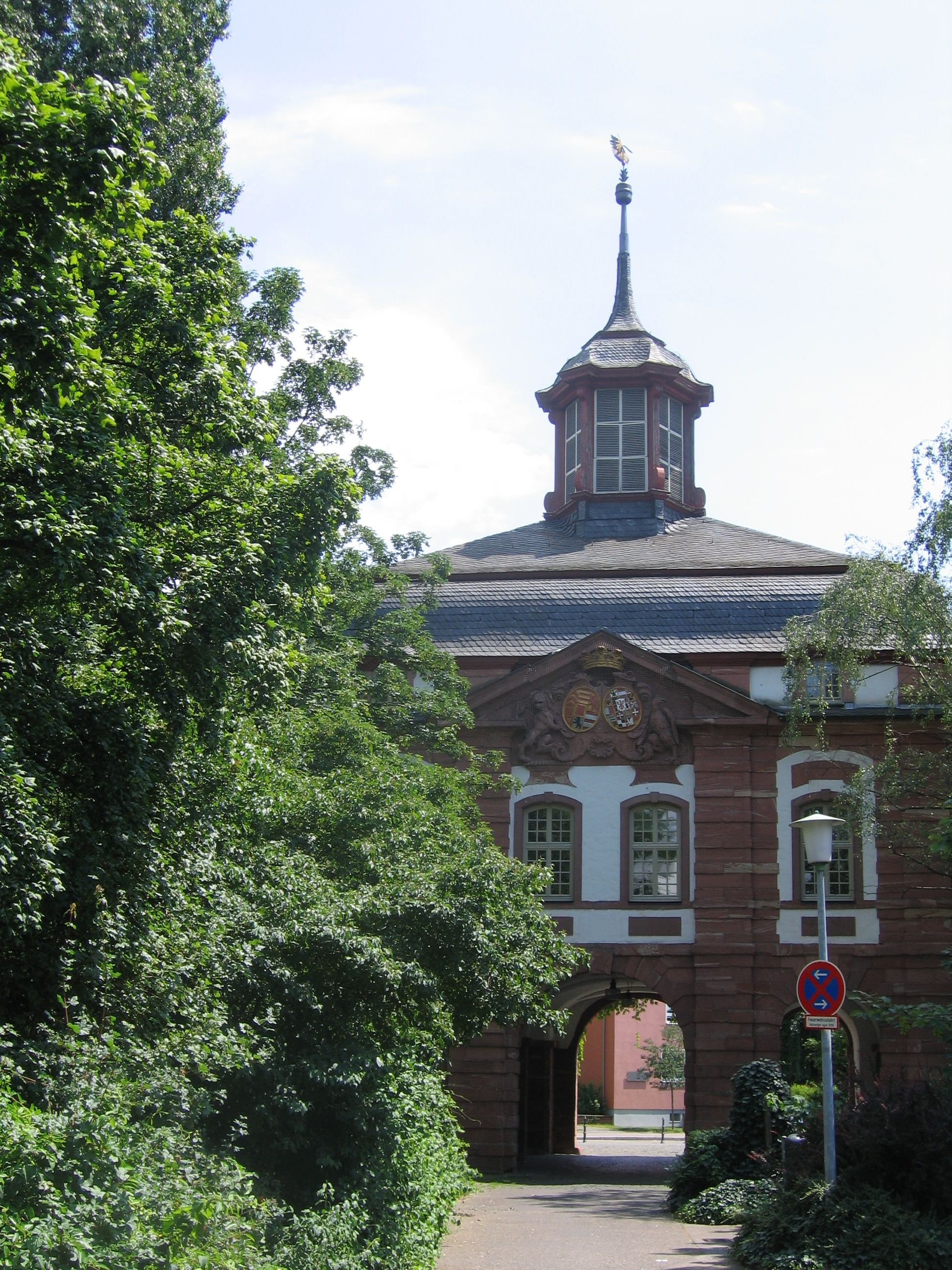
Frankfurt Gate, west side

In 1701, Philipp Reinhard began the construction of Philippsruhe Castle, which was named after him, in the village of Kesselstadt, to the west of Hanau, just outside the city gate. In 1712, he began the construction of new stables for the City Palace in Hanau (later Hanau's City Hall; today the "Congress Park Hanau"). This project was completed after his death by his brother Johann Reinhard III. Philipp Reinhard was able to complete, during his lifetime, the construction of the college building, which today houses the city library, opposite the City Palace.

== Personal life ==
On 27 February [O.S. 17 February] 1689, Philipp Reinhard married his cousin, Countess Palatine Magdalena Claudia (born: 16 September 1668; died 28 November 1704), the daughter of Duke Christian II of Zweibrücken-Birkenfeld (born: 22 June 1637; died 26 April 1717). Her dowry was 18000guilders. This marriage produced:

- Stillborn child (1691), buried in the crypt in the Lutheran Church (now called: Old St. Johann's Church) in Hanau
- Stillborn child (1693)
- Katharina Magdalene of Hanau (born: 16 June [O.S. 6 June] 1695; died: 19 December [O.S. 9 December] 1695, buried in the crypt in the Lutheran Church in Hanau

After the death of his first wife, Philipp Reinhard was engaged in early 1705 to Elisabeth Louise Christine von Mauchenheim genannt von Bechtolsheim, a lady in waiting of his first wife. He intended to marry her after she had been elevated to rank of countess. Both his relatives and his councillors opposed the marriage on the grounds that she was of lower noble birth. He then broke off the engagement and bought her off with money.

On 26 December 1705, Philipp Reinhard married Charlotte Wilhelmine (born: 14 June [O.S. 4 June] 1685; died: 5 April 1767), the daughter of Duke Johann Ernst IV of Saxe-Coburg-Saalfeld. Her dowry was also 18000guilders. This second marriage remained childless.

== Death ==
Philipp Reinhard died at his Philippsruhe Castle on 4 October 1712 alone. He was interred, alongside both of his wives, in the family vault in the Lutheran Church (now the St. Johann's Church in Hanau. The tomb was destroyed when Hanau bombed during the Second World War. His second wife, Wilhelmine Charlotte, survived him by 55 years.

His younger brother Johann Reinhard III, who had until then ruled the county of Hanau-Lichtenberg, inherited Hanau-Münzenberg. This would be the last time all the territories of Hanau were united in one hand.

== Ancestors ==
Ancestors of Philipp Reinhard, Count of Hanau-Münzenberg

8. Johann Reinhard I, Count of Hanau-Lichtenberg (1569–1625)
4. Philipp Wolfgang, Count of Hanau-Lichtenberg (1595–1641)
9. Mary Elisabeth of Hohenlohe-Neuenstein (1576–1605)
2. Johann Reinhard II of Hanau-Lichtenberg (1628–1666)
10. Ludwig Eberhard of Oettingen-Oettingen (1588–1634)
5. Johanna of Oettingen-Oettingen (1602–1639)
11. Margarethe of Erbach (1576–1636)
1. Philipp Reinhard of Hanau-Lichtenberg (1664–1712)
12. Charles I, Count Palatine of Zweibrücken-Birkenfeld (1560–1600)
6. Christian I, Count Palatine of Birkenfeld-Bischweiler (1598–1654)
13. Dorothea of Brunswick-Lüneburg (1570–1635)
3. Anna Magdalena, Countess Palatine of Zweibrücken-Birkenfeld (1640–1693)
14. Johann II, Count Palatine of Zweibrücken (1584–1635)
7. Countess Palatine Magdalene Catherine of Zweibrücken (1607-1648)
15. Katharina of Rohan (1578–1607)

Philipp Reinhard, Count of Hanau-Münzenberg House of Hanau Born: 2 August 1664 Died: 4 October 1712
Preceded by Friedrich Casimir	Count of Hanau-Münzenberg; 1680–1712	Succeeded by Johann Reinhard III

== Bibliography ==
- Reinhard Dietrich: Die Landesverfassung in dem Hanauischen = Hanauer Geschichtsblätter, vol. 34, Hanau, 1996, ISBN 3-9801933-6-5.
- Samuel Endemann: Reisen der beiden Grafen Philipp Reinhard und Johann Reinhard von Hanau, in: Hanauisches Magazin, vol. 3, 1780, issues 36, 37, 41, 45-47.
- Uta Löwenstein: Die Grafschaft Hanau vom Ende des 16. Jahrhunderts bis zum Anfall an Hessen., in: Neues Magazin für Hanauische Geschichte, 2005, p. 11 ff.
- Reinhard Suchier: Genealogie des Hanauer Grafenhauses, in: Festschrift des Hanauer Geschichtsvereins zu seiner fünfzigjährigen Jubelfeier am 27. August 1894, Hanau, 1894.
- Reinhard Suchier: Die Grabmonumente und Särge der in Hanau bestatteten Personen aus den Häusern Hanau und Hessen, in: Programm des Königlichen Gymnasiums zu Hanau, Hanau, 1879, p. 1 - 56.
- Richard Wille: Die letzten Grafen von Hanau-Lichtenberg, in: Mitteilungen des Hanauer Bezirksvereins für hessische Geschichte und Landeskunde, vol. 12, Hanau, 1886, p. 56-68.
- Ernst J. Zimmermann: Hanau Stadt und Land, 3rd ed., Hanau, 1919, reprinted 1978.
