= Countess Johanna Magdalena of Hanau-Lichtenberg =

Countess of Leiningen-Dagsburg-Falkenburg

Countess Johanna Magdalene
- Countess consort of Leiningen-Dagsburg-Falkenburg
- Born: 18 December 1660; Bischofsheim am Hohen Steg
- Died: 21 August 1715 (aged 54); Hanau
- Noble family: Hanau
- Spouse: John, Count of Leiningen-Dagsburg-Falkenburg
- Issue: Christian Karl Reinhard, Count of Leiningen-Dagsburg-Falkenburg
- Father: Johann Reinhard II of Hanau-Lichtenberg
- Mother: Countess Palatine Anna Magdalena of Birkenfeld-Bischweiler

Countess Johanna Magdalene of Hanau-Lichtenberg (18 December 1660, Bischofsheim am Hohen Steg – 21 August 1715, Hanau) was a German noblewoman, by birth member of the House of Hanau.

== Early life ==
Johanna Magdalene was born as the eldest daughter of Johann Reinhard II of Hanau-Lichtenberg (1628–1666) and the Countess Palatine Anna Magdalena of Birkenfeld-Bischweiler (1640–1693).

She died on 21 August 1715 and is said to have been buried in the St. Mary's Church in Hanau.

== Marriage and issue ==
On 5 December 1685 Johanna Magdalena married Count John Charles August of Leiningen-Dagsburg (born: 17 March 1662; died: 3 November 1698). They had the following children:

1. Anna Dorothea Charlotte (born: 11 August 1687; died young)
2. Alexandrine Catherine (born: 21 August 1688; died: November 1708)
3. Sophie Magdalena (born: 14 April 1691; died: 18 March 1727)
  1. married on 1 September 1723 Wild- and Rhinegrave John Charles Louis (born: 20 June 1686 at Rheingrafenstein Castle; died: 21 October 1740), son of Count Frederick William of Salm-Grumbach (1644–1706) and his wife Countess Louise of Leiningen (1654–1723)
4. Marie Christine Felicizitas (born: 29 December 1692; died: 3 June 1734 in Eisenach)
  1. married on 4 December 1711 Prince Christopher of Baden-Durlach (born: 9 October 1684 at Karlsburg Castle in Durlach; died: 2 May 1723 in Karlsruhe), son of the Margrave Frederick VII Magnus of Baden-Durlach (1647–1709) and his wife Princess Augusta Maria of Holstein-Gottorp (1649–1728)
  2. married on 29 May 1727 at Philippsruhe Castle in Hanau-Kesselstadt to Duke John William III of Saxe-Eisenach (born: 17 October 1666 in Friedewald; died: 14 January 1729 in Eisenach), son of the Duke John George I of Saxe-Eisenach (1634–1686) and his wife Countess Johanetta of Sayn-Wittgenstein (1626–1701)
5. William Christian Reinhard (born: 30 September 1693 at Broich Castle; died: 1 December 1693, ibid)
6. Christian Karl Reinhard (born: 7 July 1695 at Broich Castle; died: 17 November 1766 in Heidesheim am Rhein)
  1. married on 27 November 1726 in Mettenheim with Katharina Polyxena of Solms-Rödelheim (born: 40 January 1702 in Rödelheim; died: 29 March 1765 in Heidenheim), daughter of Count Louis of Solms-Rödelheim (1664–1716) and his wife Countess Charlotte Sibylle of Ahlefeldt-Rixingen (1672–1716). In 1698, he succeeded his father as ruler of Leiningen-Dagsburg.
7. John Louis William (born: 5 April 1697 at Broich Castle; died: November 1742)
  1. married around 1730 to Sofie Eleonore (born: 1710 in Dagsburg; died: 19 June 1768), daughter of Count Leopold Emich of Leiningen (1685–1719) and his wife Countess Charlotte Amalie of Leiningen (1682–1729)

== Ancestry ==
Ancestors of Countess Johanna Magdalena of Hanau-Lichtenberg

8. Johann Reinhard I, Count of Hanau-Lichtenberg (1569-1625)
4. Philip Wolfgang, Count of Hanau-Lichtenberg (1595-1641)
9. Countess Marie Elisabeth of Hohenlohe-Neuenstein (1576-1605)
2. Count Johann Reinhard II of Hanau-Lichtenberg (1628-1666)
10. Count Louis Eberhard of Öttingen-Öttingen (1577-1634)
5. Countess Johanna of Öttingen-Öttingen (1602-1639)
11. Countess Margarethe of Erbach (1576-1636)
1. Johanna Magdalene of Hanau-Lichtenberg
12. Charles I, Count Palatine of Zweibrücken-Birkenfeld (1560-1600)
6. Christian I, Count Palatine of Birkenfeld-Bischweiler (1598-1654)
13. Princess Dorothea of Brunswick-Lüneburg (1570-1649)
3. Countess Palatine Anna Magdalena of Birkenfeld-Bischweiler (1640-1693)
14. John II, Count Palatine of Zweibrücken (1584-1635)
7. Countess Palatine Magdalene Catherine of Zweibrücken (1607-1648)
15. Countess Catherine of Rohan (1578-1607)
