= Elisabeth Johanna of Veldenz =

- Coat-of-arms of Palatinate-Veldenz.
- Born: 22 February 1653; Lauterecken
- Died: 5 February 1718 (aged 64); Mörchingen
- Buried: Diemeringen
- Noble family: House of Wittelsbach
- Spouse: John XI of Salm-Kyrburg
- Father: Leopold Louis, Count Palatine of Veldenz
- Mother: Agatha Christine of Hanau-Lichtenberg

Countess Palatine Elisabeth Johanna of Veldenz (22 February 1653 in Lauterecken – 5 February 1718 in Mörchingen), was a Countess Palatine of Veldenz by birth and by marriage Wald- and Rhinegravine of Salm-Kyrburg.

== Life ==
Elisabeth Johanna was a daughter of Count Palatine Leopold Louis of Veldenz (1625-1694) and his wife Agatha Christine (1632-1681), the daughter of Count Philip Wolfgang of Hanau-Lichtenberg.

She married on 27 December 1669 to Wild- and Rhinegrave John XI of Salm-Kyrburg (1635-1688). The marriage remained childless. After John's death in 1689, Elisabeth Johanna received Mörchingen Castle and the Lordships of Diemeringen and Helfingen as her Wittum. After Elisabeth Johanna's death, the County of Mörchingen was claimed by the female descendants of John Casimir, Count Palatine of Kleeburg and George Frederick, Wild- and Rhinegrave of Salm-Kyrburg. In 1729, a Lotharingian court ruled in their favour
