= Louise Sophie of Hanau-Lichtenberg =

Countess Louise Sophie of Hanau-Lichtenberg, Countess of Nassau-Ottweiler
- Countess consort of Nassau-Ottweiler
- Born: 11 April 1662; Bischofsheim am Hohen Steg
- Died: 9 April 1751 (aged 88); Ottweiler
- Noble family: House of Hanau (by birth); House of Nassau (by marriage)
- Spouse: Frederick Louis, Count of Nassau-Ottweiler
- Father: Johann Reinhard II, Count of Hanau-Lichtenberg
- Mother: Countess Palatine Anna Magdalena of Birkenfeld-Bischweiler

Countess Louise Sophie of Hanau-Lichtenberg (11 April 1662 in Bischofsheim am Hohen Steg – 9 April 1751 in Ottweiler) was a German noblewoman, Countess consort of Nassau-Ottweiler.

== Early life and ancestry ==
Born into the House of Hanau, she was the second eldest daughter of Johann Reinhard II, Count of Hanau-Lichtenberg (1628–1666) and his wife, Countess Palatine Anna Magdalena of Birkenfeld-Bischweiler (1640–1693).

== Marriage ==
She married on 27 September 1697 to Frederick Louis, Count of Nassau-Ottweiler (13 November 1651 – 25 May 1728) as his second wife. The union produced one child, a stillborn son, on 6 October 1698.

== Death ==
Countess Louise Sophie died on 9 April 1751 in Ottweiler, aged 88.

== Ancestors ==
Ancestors of Louise Sophie of Hanau-Lichtenberg

8. Johann Reinhard I, Count of Hanau-Lichtenberg (1569-1625)
4. Philip Wolfgang, Count of Hanau-Lichtenberg (1595-1641)
9. Mary Elisabeth of Hohenlohe-Neuenstein (1576-1605)
2. Johann Reinhard II of Hanau-Lichtenberg (1628-1666)
10. Louis Eberhard of Öttingen-Öttingen (1588-1634)
5. Johanna of Öttingen-Öttingen (1602-1639)
11. Margarethe of Erbach (1576--1636)
1. Louise Sophie of Hanau-Lichtenberg (1662-1751)
12. Charles I, Count Palatine of Zweibrücken-Birkenfeld (1560-1600)
6. Christian I, Count Palatine of Birkenfeld-Bischweiler (1598-1654)
13. Dorothea of Brunswick-Lüneburg (1570-1635)
3. Anna Magdalena, Countess Palatine of Zweibrücken-Birkenfeld (1640-1693)
14. John II, Count Palatine of Zweibrücken (1584-1635)
7. Magdalena Katharina, Countess Palatine of Zweibrücken (1607-1648)
15. Catherine of Rohan (1578-1607)
