= Johann Reinhard III of Hanau-Lichtenberg =

Johann Reinhard III
- Count of Hanau-Lichtenberg
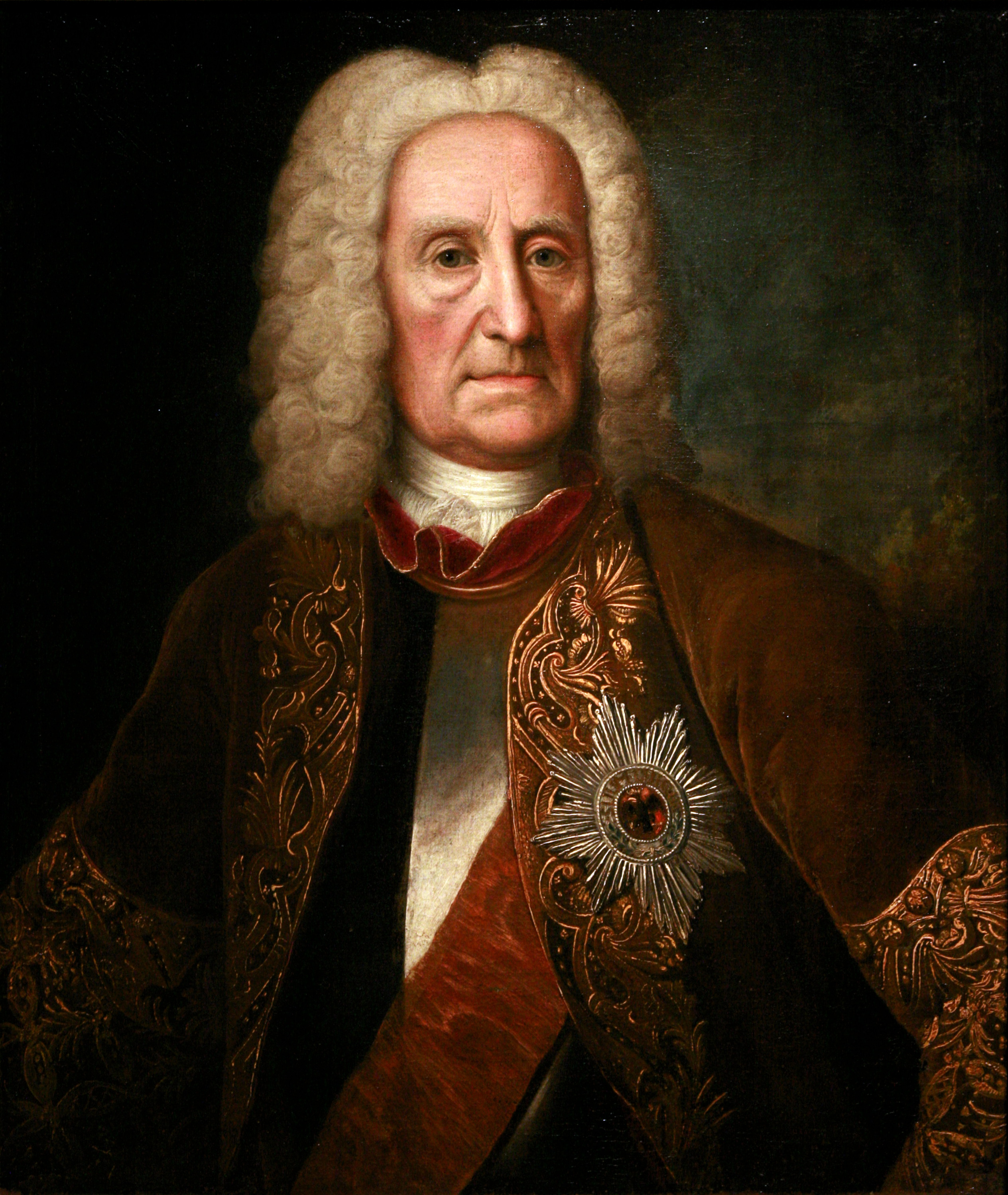
- Oil on canvas portrait, by Johann Christian Fiedler (1697–1765), on display at Strasbourg Historical Museum
- Born: 31 July 1665; Bischofsheim am hohen Steg
- Died: 28 March 1736 (aged 70); Philippsruhe Castle, Hanau
- Noble family: Hanau
- Spouse: Dorothea Friederike of Brandenburg-Ansbach (m. 1699; died 1731)
- Issue: Charlotte, Hereditary Princess of Hesse-Darmstadt
- Father: Johann Reinhard II of Hanau-Lichtenberg
- Mother: Anna Magdalena, Countess Palatine of Zweibrücken-Birkenfeld

Johann Reinhard III of Hanau-Lichtenberg (31 July 1665 in Bischofsheim am hohen Steg (now called Rheinbischofsheim) – 28 March 1736 in Schloss Philippsruhe, Hanau) was the last of the House of Hanau. He reigned over the County of Hanau-Lichtenberg from 1680 to 1736. From 1712 to 1736, he also reigned the County of Hanau-Münzenberg.

== Childhood and youth ==
Johann Reinhard III was the son of Johann Reinhard II of Hanau-Lichtenberg and Anna Magdalena, Countess Palatine of Zweibrücken-Birkenfeld. He was baptized on 1 August 1665.

He was educated together with his older brother Philipp Reinhard, initially in Strasbourg. In 1678, they moved to Babenhausen, where their mother lived at the time. In 1678, they started a Grand Tour to the Alsace, Switzerland and Geneva. In 1690, the travelled for a year in Savoy and Turin, in 1681 to Paris, in 1683 to the Netherlands, England and some French provinces. In early 1684, they were in Milan, from there they went to see the carnival in Venice, followed by a trip to Rome (with audiences with Pope Innocent XII and queen Christina of Sweden), then to Naples, Florence, Modena, Parma, and Mantua. In 1686, they visited the imperial court in Vienna and on the way back, they traveled to Bohemia and visited the Electoral Saxon court in Dresden.

== Reigning Hanau ==
=== Regency ===
Johann Reinhard III came to the throne of the county of Hanau-Lichtenberg on 24 May 1680 (Julian, i.e. 3 June 1680 Gregorian) at the age of 15, after his family had deposed his uncle Friedrich Casimir, because his financial escapades had ruined the county. As Johann Reinhard III was a minor, the county was ruled by his guardians: his mother and his uncle Christian II of Zweibrücken-Birkenfeld.

At the same time, Johann Reinhard III's older brother Philipp Reinhard came to the throne of Hanau-Münzenberg. When this division was implemented, the district of Babenhausen was awarded to Hanau-Münzenberg; this decision was confirmed in a treaty in 1691. In 1685, Johann Reinhard III was legally adopted by his deposed uncle Friedrich Casimir. In 1688, he came of age and took over the government. In 1691, duke Christian II filed his final report on the guardianship.

== Policy ==
The economic situation in the county of Hanau-Lichtenberg was very bad, because the Upper Rhine valley, in which the county was situated, had been devastated during the War of the Palatinian Succession (1688–1697) and the War of Spanish Succession (1702–1713) and related military occupations. Johann Reinhard III tried to improve the situation. The political situation was also problematic: his predecessor had been forced to acknowledge French supremacy over the parts of the county located in Alsace. He could only rule those areas because he received "Letters Patent" to that effect from the French king Louis XIV in 1701 and 1707. Johann Reinhard III tried in vain to be raised to the rank of Imperial Prince. After it was clear that he would have no male heirs, he discontinued these efforts.

When Philipp Reinhard died in 1712, Johann Reinhard III inherited Hanau-Münzenberg. Under his rule, the two sub-counties were united in one hand for the last time. He alternated his residence between the two part of the county. He also succeeded his brother as director of the Wetterau Association of Imperial Counts.

=== Culture ===
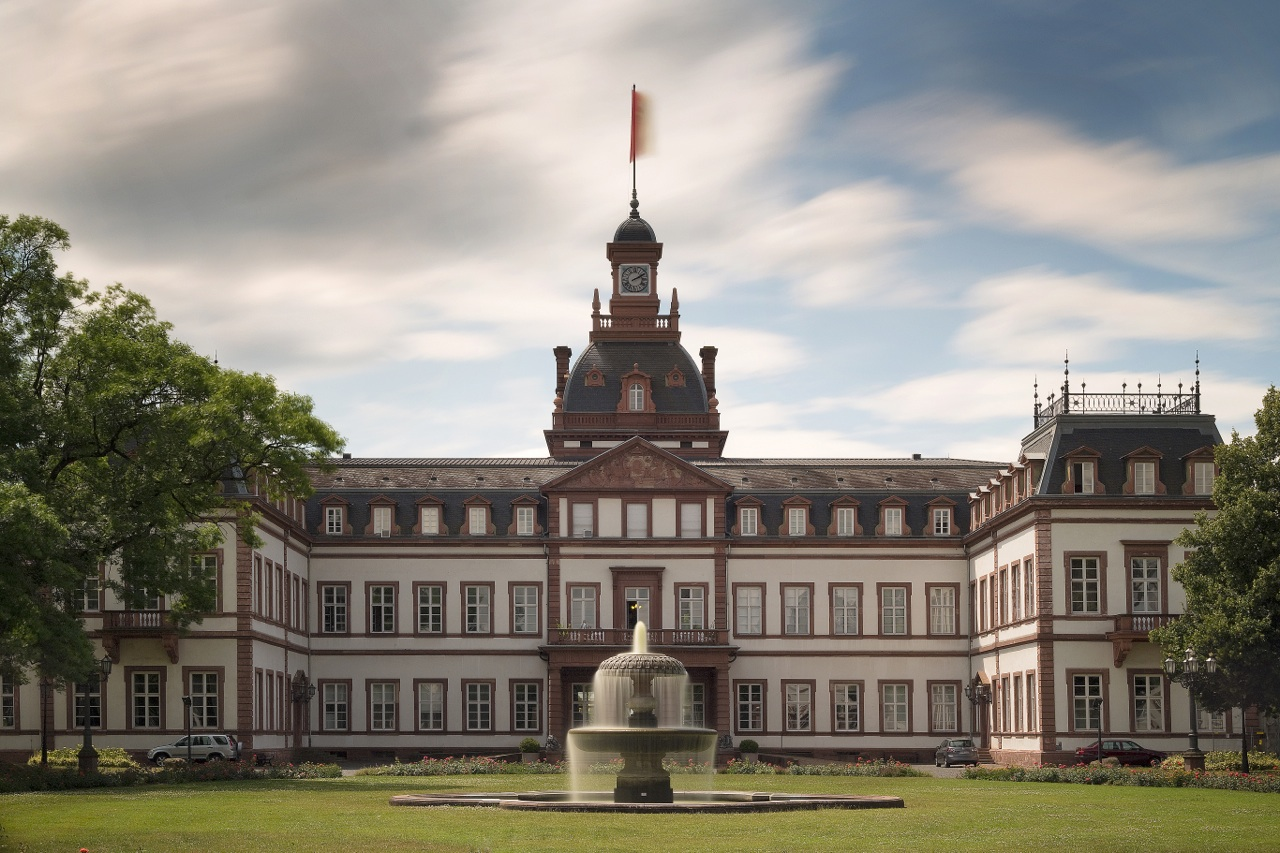
Schloss Philippsruhe, Hanau

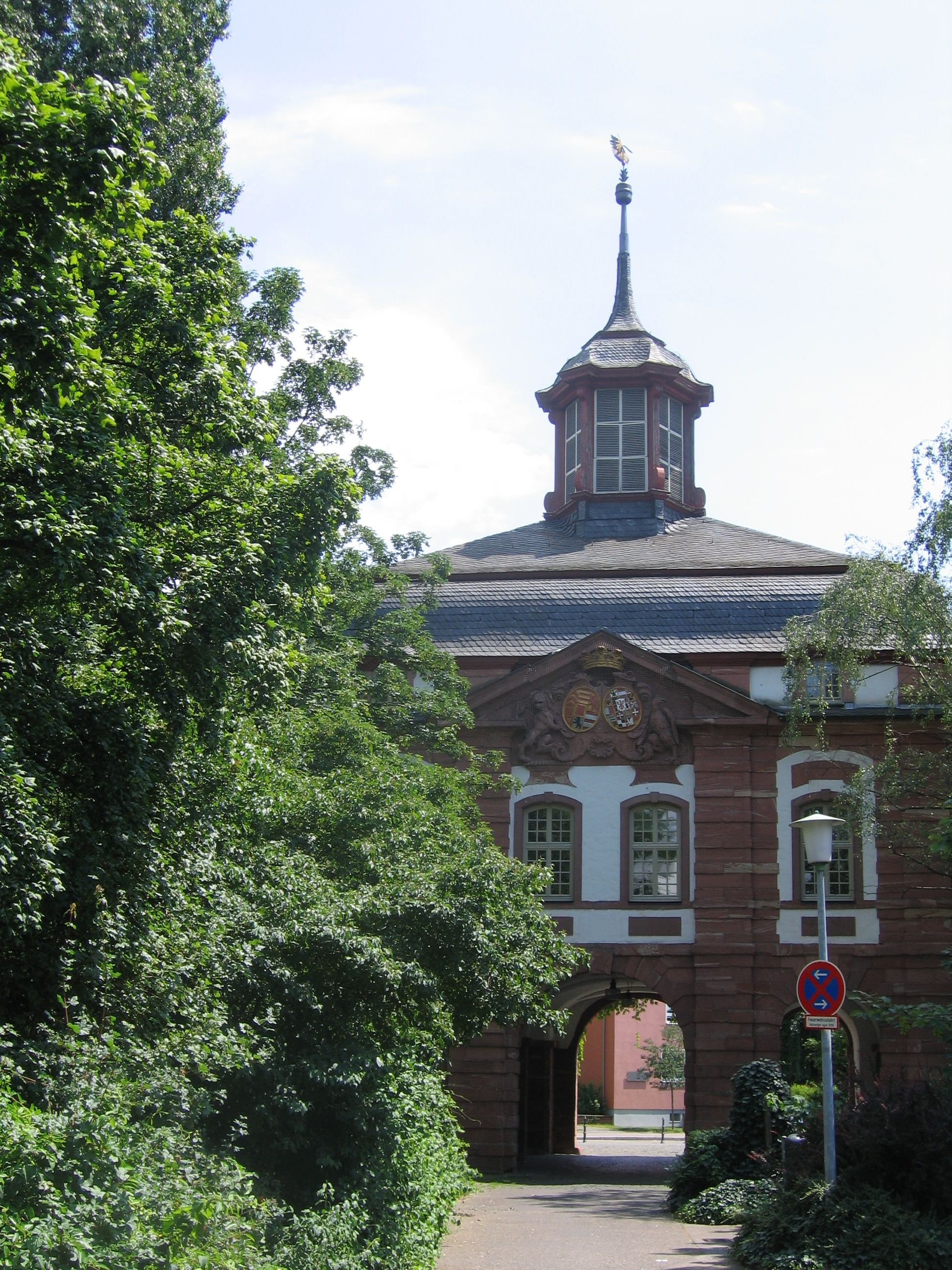
Frankfurt Gate, west side

During the reign of Johann Reinhard II, the County of Hanau prospered culturally: he began building a grand castle in Bischofsheim am hohen Steg (now called Rheinbischofsheim), which was never completed, and in the Hanau-Lichtenberg of Buchsweiler (now called Bouxwiller), he created a park and expanded the castle. In the 1720s, he constructed a hunting lodge in Pirmasens, Schloss Pirmasens. Between 1730 and 1736 he rebuilt the Hanauer Hof (or Hôtel de Hanau) in Strasbourg, which had been the city residence of the counts of Hanau-Lichtenberg since 1573. This building now serves as Strasbourg's city hall.

After he took office in Hanau-Münzenberg 1712, he completed the construction of the Schloss Philippsruhe, just outside the Hanau city gate, and the Philippsruhe Avenue, including the Heller bridge. He also created Chestnut Avenue and the Pheasant Park (at the later Wilhelmsbad) and completed construction of the stables of the City Palace in Hanau (later Hanau's city hall; today the "Congress Park Hanau"), which Philipp Reinhard had started. Behind the city palace, the city wall was breached in order to obtain a direct access to the Turkish style gardens behind it.

In 1727, he extended the St. John's Church in Hanau, in which the counts of Hanau were buried. He built Lutheran churches in Windecken, Steinau an der Straße, Nauheim (now called: Bad Nauheim), Kesselstadt and Rodheim (the "Reinhard Church") and Lutheran schools in many towns in the county of Hanau-Münzenberg. The reason for this was that Hanau-Münzenberg has adopted Calvinism during the Reformation, but had been ruled since 1643 by the Lutheran counts of Hanau-Lichtenberg. By the early 18th century, the contrast between the two main Protestant variants had mitigated to the extent that this building policy was now acceptable for the Calvinist majority of the population.

In his capital city of Hanau, street lighting was introduced. The Frankfurt Gate was torn down and rebuilt in a Baroque style, and the same was done to the Hanau's city hall.

Personally, Count Johann Reinhard III lived rather modestly, which enabled him to finance his construction projects.

Johann Wolfgang von Goethe reported, in his Dichtung und Wahrheit (Chapter 10) on a visit to Buchsweiler at the end of the 18th century: "Above all else, the name of the last Count, Reinhard of Hanau, was held in high esteem here and in the rest of this little country. His great intellect and ability in all his actions came to the fore, and many beautiful monument remain of his existence. Such men have the advantage of being double benefactors, for the present, which they delight, and also for the future, whose sense and courage they nurture and sustain."

== Inheritance ==
Once it became clear that there would be no male heir in Hanau, a dispute about the inheritance erupted. There were two main candidates:

- Landgrave Ludwig IX of Hesse-Darmstadt, the son of Johann Reinhard III's daughter Charlotte (who had already died) and landgrave Ludwig VIII of Hesse-Darmstadt;
- Landgrave Wilhelm VIII of Hesse-Kassel, who claimed the Münzenberg part of the county, based on an inheritance treaty of 1643 between Hanau and the Landgraviate of Hesse-Kassel.

In this situation, Count Johann Reinhard III tried to make his daughter and his grandson in Hesse-Darmstadt inherit as much of Hanau as possible. That was relatively easy for the Lichtenberg part of the country, to which the 1643 treaty did not apply. It took considerable financial effort in 1717, however, to include the passive fiefs of the Bishopric of Strasbourg and Archbishopric of Mainz into Ludwig's inheritance, because fiefs were usually only hereditary in the male line. For this payment, count Johann Reinhard III borrowed 100,000 florins from the Landgrave of Hesse-Kassel and pledged the Hanau district of Brandenstein as security for this loan.

Anticipating the inheritance, Hesse-Kassel paid 600,000 taler to buy off claims by the Electorate of Saxony on the imperial fief held by Hanau-Münzenberg. Saxony had acquired these claims from the emperor during the Thirty Years' War. Hesse-Kassel pledged the districts Frauensee, Landeck and Treffurt; Frauensee and Landeck were redeemed in 1743.

Most problematic, however, was whether the district of Babenhausen belonged to the Lichtenberg or the Münzenberg part of the inheritance. Here, too, Count Johann Reinhard III tried to strengthen the position of his daughter and grandson in Hesse-Darmstadt. In a will written in 1729, he bequeathed Babenhausen to Ludwig IX of Hesse-Darmstadt. On this issue, Hesse-Kassel initially appeared to be cooperative. Agreements were signed in 1714, 1718 and 1720. In 1730, however, Landgrave Friedrich I of Hesse-Kassel came to the throne and Hesse-Kassel's stance changed. On 17 April 1730, he sent the Hessian army to Hanau, to ensure his future inheritance. Count Johann Reinhard swore allegiance to Friedrich; this suspended the problem during his lifetime.

== Death ==
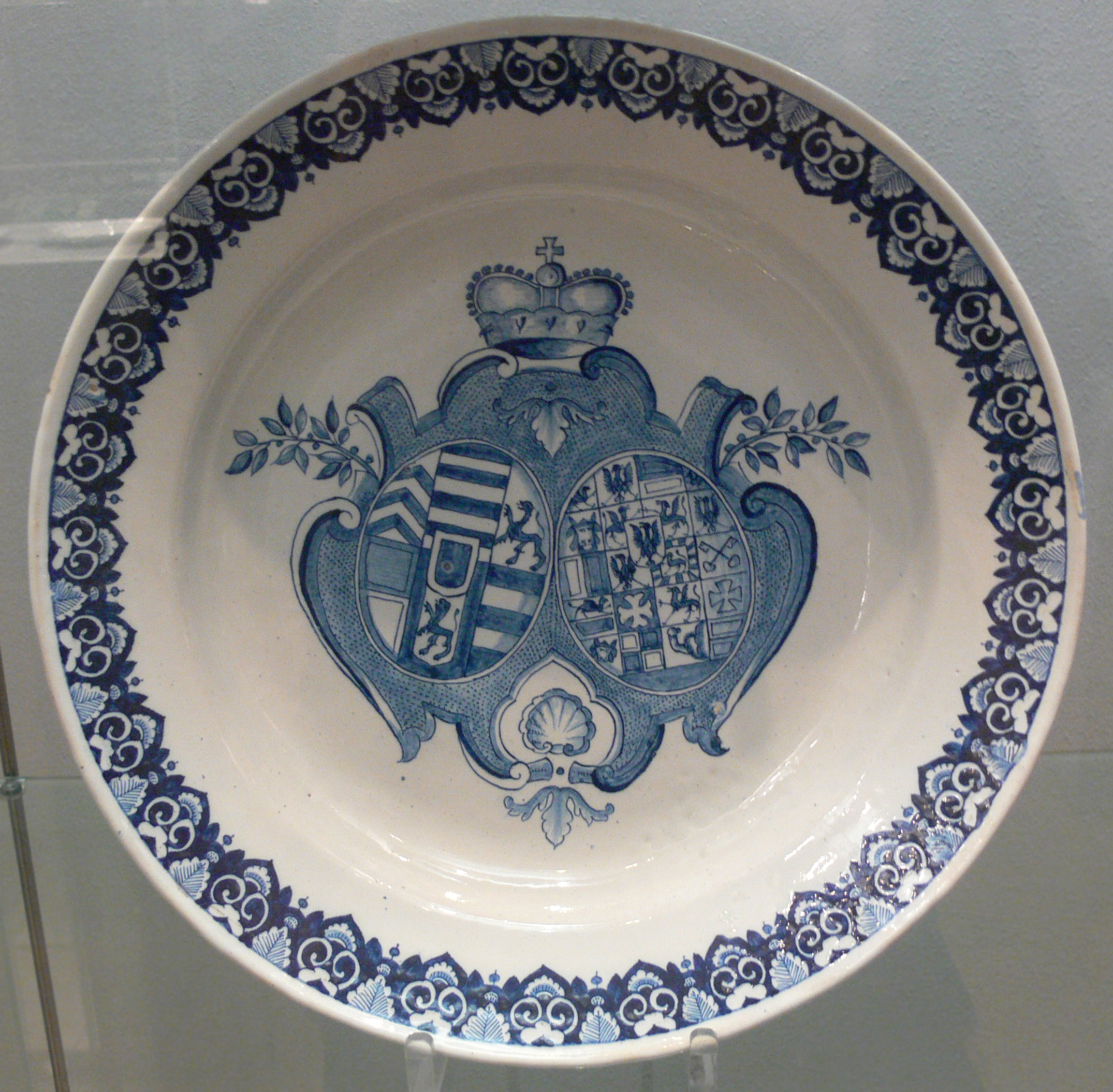
Combined coats of arms of Johann Reinhard III of and Frederike Dorothea of Brandenburg-Ansbach, faience from Ansbach, probably made in 1724 on the occasion of their silver wedding

Johann Reinhard III. died on 28 March 1736 in Schloss Philippsruhe in Hanau. On his deathbed, he was surrounded by the diplomatic and notarized representatives of his heirs. He was buried in the family crypt in the St. Johann's Church in Hanau. The crypt was destroyed when Hanau was bombed during the Second World War.

The question whether Babenhausen belonged to Hanau-Lichtenberg or Hanau-Münzenberg was disputed for decades after his death. It was settled at the end of the 18th century by dividing the district.

== Marriage and issue ==
Johann Reinhard III married on 20 or 30 August 1699 Countess Dorothea Friederike of Brandenburg-Ansbach (1676–1731). Her sister Caroline would later marry the British prince who became King George II.

Johann Reinhard III and Frederike Dorothea had one daughter:

- Charlotte Christine Magdalene Johanna (1700–1726), who married Landgrave Louis VIII of Hesse-Darmstadt (1691–1768).

== Ancestry ==
Ancestors of Johann Reinhard III of Hanau-Lichtenberg

8. Johann Reinhard I, Count of Hanau-Lichtenberg
4. Philipp Wolfgang, Count of Hanau-Lichtenberg
9. Mary Elisabeth of Hohenlohe-Neuenstein
2. Johann Reinhard II of Hanau-Lichtenberg
10. Ludwig Eberhard of Öttingen-Öttingen
5. Johanna of Öttingen-Öttingen
11. Margarethe of Erbach
1. Johann Reinhard III of Hanau-Lichtenberg
12. Charles I, Count Palatine of Zweibrücken-Birkenfeld
6. Christian I, Count Palatine of Birkenfeld-Bischweiler
13. Dorothea of Brunswick-Lüneburg
3. Anna Magdalena, Countess Palatine of Zweibrücken-Birkenfeld
14. Johann II, Count Palatine of Zweibrücken
7. Magdalena Katharina, Countess Palatine of Zweibrücken
15. Catherine de Rohan

== Sources and references ==
- Rudolf Bernges: Aus dem Hofleben des letzten Grafen von Hanau Johann Reinhard , in Hanauisches Magazin, 11, Hanau, 1923
- Julius Rathgeber" Die Graffschaft Hanau-Lichtenberg, Strasbourg, 1876
- Carl Richard Wille: Die letzten Grafen von Hanau-Lichtenberg, Hanau, 1886
- Reinhard Dietrich: Die Landesverfassung in dem Hanauischen = Hanauer Geschichtsblätter, issue 34, Hanau, 1996, ISBN 3-9801933-6-5
- Samuel Endemann: Reisen der beiden Grafen Philipp Reinhard und Johann Reinhard von Hanau, in: Hanauisches Magazin, issue 3, 1780, pp. 36, 37, 41 and 45-47
- J. G. Lehmann: Urkundliche Geschichte der Grafschaft Hanau-Lichtenberg im unteren Elsasse, vol. 2, place of publication unknown, 1862, reprinted Pirmasens, 1970, p. 512 ff
- Günter Rauch: Hanau und Kassel. Zum Aussterben des Hanauer Grafenhauses, in: Neues Magazin für Hanauische Geschichte, vol 9, 1987, pp. 57–70
- Reinhard Suchier: Genealogie des Hanauer Grafenhauses, in: Festschrift des Hanauer Geschichtsvereins zu seiner fünfzigjährigen Jubelfeier am 27. August 1894, Hanau, 1894
- Richard Wille: Die letzten Grafen von Hanau-Lichtenberg = Mitteilungen des Hanauer Bezirksvereins für hessische Geschichte und Landeskunde, issue 12, Hanau, 1886, pp. 56–68.
- Ernst Julius Zimmermann: Hanau Stadt und Land, 3rd edition, Hanau, 1919, reprinted in 1978.

Johann Reinhard III of Hanau-Lichtenberg House of Hanau-Lichtenberg Born: 31 July 1665 Died: 28 March 1736
Preceded by Friedrich Casimir, Count of Hanau-Lichtenberg	Count of Hanau-Lichtenberg; 1680–1736	Succeeded by Ludwig IX, Landgrave of Hesse-Darmstadt
Preceded by Philipp Reinhard, Count of Hanau-Münzenberg	Count of Hanau-Münzenberg; 1712–1736	Succeeded by Wilhelm VIII, Landgrave of Hesse-Kassel
