= Countess Palatine Anna Magdalena of Birkenfeld-Bischweiler =

Countess Palatine Anna Magdalena
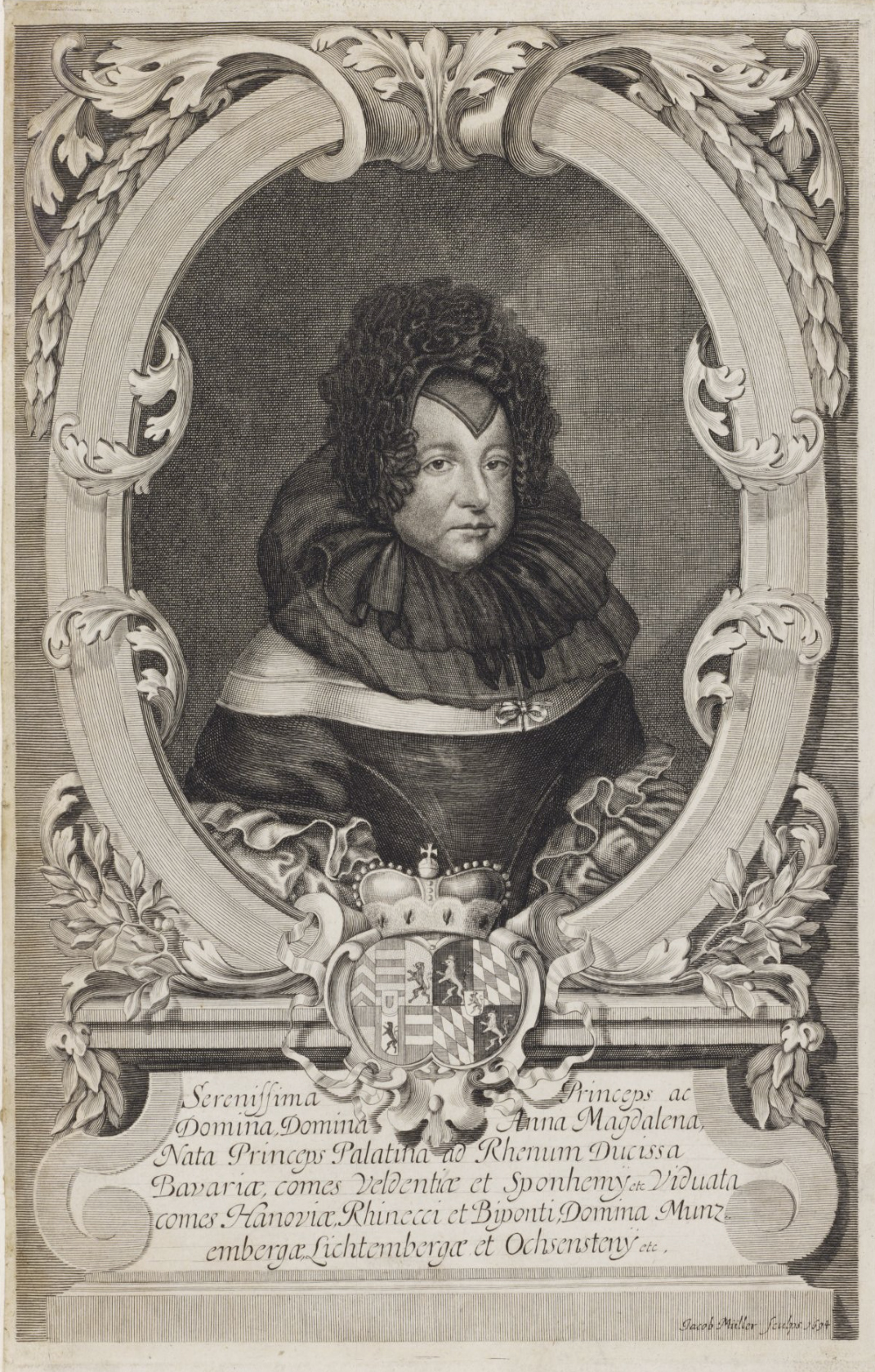
- Engraving c. 1690–1695
- Born: 14 February 1640; Strasbourg
- Died: 12 December 1693 (aged 53); Babenhausen
- Burial: St. John's Church in Hanau
- Spouse: Johann Reinhard II of Hanau-Lichtenberg (m. 1659; died 1666)
- Issue Detail: Johanna, Countess of Leiningen-Dagsburg-Falkenburg; Louise, Countess of Nassau-Ottweiler; Countess Franziska Albertina; Philipp Reinhard, Count of Hanau-Münzenberg; Johann Reinhard III, Count of Hanau-Lichtenberg
- House: Wittelsbach
- Father: Christian I, Count Palatine of Birkenfeld-Bischweiler
- Mother: Countess Palatine Magdalene Catherine of Zweibrücken

Countess Palatine Anna Magdalena of Birkenfeld-Bischweiler (14 February 1640 – 12 December 1693) was the daughter of Christian I, Count Palatine of Birkenfeld-Bischweiler (1598–1654), and his first wife, Countess Palatine Magdalene Catherine of Zweibrücken.

== Life ==
Anna Magdalena was born in Strasbourg. She married, on 18 October 1659, Johann Reinhard II of Hanau-Lichtenberg, a posthumous member of the House of Hanau, who never came to the throne. The marriage produced five children:

- Johanna Magdalene of Hanau-Lichtenberg (18 December 1660 in Bischofsheim am Hohen Steg - 21 August 1715). She is said to have been buried in the St. Mary's Church in Hanau; married on 5 December 1685 to John, Count of Leiningen-Dagsburg-Falkenburg (17 March 1662 - 3 November 1698).
- Louise Sophie of Hanau-Lichtenberg (11 April 1662 in Bischofsheim am Hohen Steg - 9 April 1751 in Ottweiler); married on 27 September 1697 to Frederick Louis, Count of Nassau-Saarbrücken-Ottweiler (13 November 1651 - 25 May 1728)
- Franziska Albertina of Hanau-Lichtenberg (1 May 1663 in Bischofsheim am Hohen Steg - 1736 in Ottweiler); unmarried.
- Philip Reinhard, Count of Hanau-Münzenberg (2 August 1664 in Bischofsheim am Hohen Steg - 4 October 1712 at Philippsruhe Castle in Hanau)
- Johann Reinhard III of Hanau-Lichtenberg (31 July 1665 in Bischofsheim am Hohen Steg - 28 March 1736 in Philippsruhe Castle).

Anna Magdalena's widow seat was Babenhausen Castle in Babenhausen.

== Death ==
Anna Magdalena died on 12 December 1693 at Babenhausen and was buried on 6 February 1694 in the family vault of the St. John's Church in Hanau. This tomb, including Anna Magdalena's grave, was completely destroyed by bombing during the Second World War.

On the occasion of her funeral, several funeral sermons appeared in print:

- Anonymous, Klüglich gewählet, seelig entseelet ..., printed in Hanau in 1694 by Johann Adolph Aubry
- Anonymous, Kürzlich entworfene Personalia ...
- Friedrich Christian of Edelsheim, Hanau in 1694?
- Johann Daniel Guckelin, [funeral sermon]
- M. Langermann und Johannes Laurentius, Lob- und Ehrengedächtnis ..., printed in Hanau by Johann Adolph Aubry
- Adam Sellius, [funeral sermon]

== Ancestors ==
Ancestors of Countess Palatine Anna Magdalena of Birkenfeld-Bischweiler

8. Wolfgang, Count Palatine of Zweibrücken
4. Charles I, Count Palatine of Zweibrücken-Birkenfeld
9. Anna of Hesse
2. Christian I, Count Palatine of Birkenfeld-Bischweiler
10. William, Duke of Brunswick-Lüneburg
5. Duchess Dorothea of Brunswick-Lüneburg
11. Dorothea of Denmark
1. Countess Palatine Anna Magdalena of Birkenfeld-Bischweiler
12. John I, Count Palatine of Zweibrücken
6. John II, Count Palatine of Zweibrücken
13. Magdalene of Jülich-Cleves-Berg
3. Countess Palatine Magdalene Catherine of Zweibrücken
14. René II, Viscount of Rohan
7. Catherine de Rohan
15. Catherine de Parthenay
