= Johann, Count of Leiningen-Dagsburg-Falkenburg =

John Charles August
- Count of Leiningen-Dagsburg
- Born: 19 March 1662; Broich Castle, Mülheim an der Ruhr
- Died: 13 November 1698 (aged 36); Broich Castle, Mülheim an der Ruhr
- Spouse: Johanna Magdalene of Hanau-Lichtenberg
- House: Leiningen
- Father: Count George William of Leiningen-Dagsburg
- Mother: Countess Anna Elisabeth of Daun-Falkenstein

Johann Karl August, Count of Leiningen-Dagsburg-Falkenburg (German: Johann Karl August von Leiningen-Dagsburg; 19 March 1662 in Schloss Broich, Mülheim an der Ruhr – 13 November 1698 in Schloss Broich) was a German nobleman. By descent, he was Count of Leiningen and Dagsburg. By heritage, he was Lord of Broich and Bürgel.

== Early life and ancestry ==
Johann Karl August was a son of Count George William of Leiningen-Dagsburg (8 March 1636, Heidesheim am Rhein – 18 July 1672, Oberstein) and Countess Anna Elisabeth von Daun-Falkenstein (1 January 1636 – 4 June 1685, Schloss Broich).

His mother was the eldest daughter of William Wirich, Count of Daun-Falkenstein (1613–1682) and Countess Elisabeth von Waldeck-Wildungen (1610–1647).

== Marriage and issue ==
On 13 December 1685, August was married at Babenhausen Castle to Johanna Magdalena (18 December 1660, Bischofsheim am Hohen Steg – 21 August 1715, Hanau), daughter of Johann Reinhard II of Hanau-Lichtenberg (1628–1666) and Anna Magdalena, Countess Palatine of Zweibrücken-Birkenfeld (1640–1693).

The couple had the following children:

- Anna Dorothea Charlotte (born 11 August 1687 at Broich Castle; died young)
- Alexandrine Katharine (21 August 1688, Broich Castle – November 1708)
- Sofie Magdalene (14 April 1691, Broich Castle – 18 March 1727); married firstly in September 1713 at Broich Castle with Johann Karl Ludwig of Salm-Grumbach (20 June 1686 Rheingrafenstein Castle – 21 October 1740), son of Count Friedrich Wilhelm of Salm-Grumbach (1644–1706) and Countess Luise of Leiningen (1654–1723)
- Marie Christine Felizitas (29 December 1692, Broich Castle – 3 June 1734, Eisenach); married firstly 4 December 1711 to Prince Christopher of Baden-Durlach (9 October 1684 at Karlsburg Castle – 2 May 1723 in Karlsruhe), son of Frederick VII, Margrave of Baden-Durlach (1647–1709) and Princess Augusta Maria of Schleswig-Holstein-Gottorp (1649–1728); married secondly on 29 May 1727 Philippsruhe Castle John William III, Duke of Saxe-Eisenach (17 October 1666, Friedewald – 14 January 1729 in Eisenach), son of John George I, Duke of Saxe-Eisenach (1634–1686) and Countess Johannetta of Sayn-Wittgenstein (1626–1701)
- William Christian Reinhard (30 November 1693, Broich Castle – 1 December 1693)
- Christian Karl Reinhard (7 July 1695, Schloss Broich – 17 November 1766, Heidenheim); married on 27 November 1726 in Mettenheim with Katharina Polyxena of Solms-Rödelheim (30 January 1702, Rödelheim – 29 March 1765, Heidenheim, Germany), daughter Count Ludwig of Solms-Rödelheim (1664–1716) and Countess Charlotte Sibylle of Ahlefeldt-Rixingen (1672–1716)
- Johann Wilhelm Ludwig (5 April 1697, Schloss Broich – November 1742); married in 1730 to Sofie Eleonore (1710, Dabo – 19 June 1768), daughter of Count Leopold Emich of Leiningen (1685–1719) and Countess Charlotte Amalie of Leiningen (1682–1729)

Johann, Count of Leiningen-Dagsburg-Falkenburg House of Leiningen Born: 19 March 1662 Died: 13 November 1698
Preceded by Emich Christian	Lord of Broich and Bürgel; 1688-1698	Succeeded by Christian Karl Reinhard
