= Princess Charlotte Wilhelmine of Saxe-Coburg-Saalfeld =

Princess Charlotte Wilhelmine
- Countess of Hanau-Münzenberg
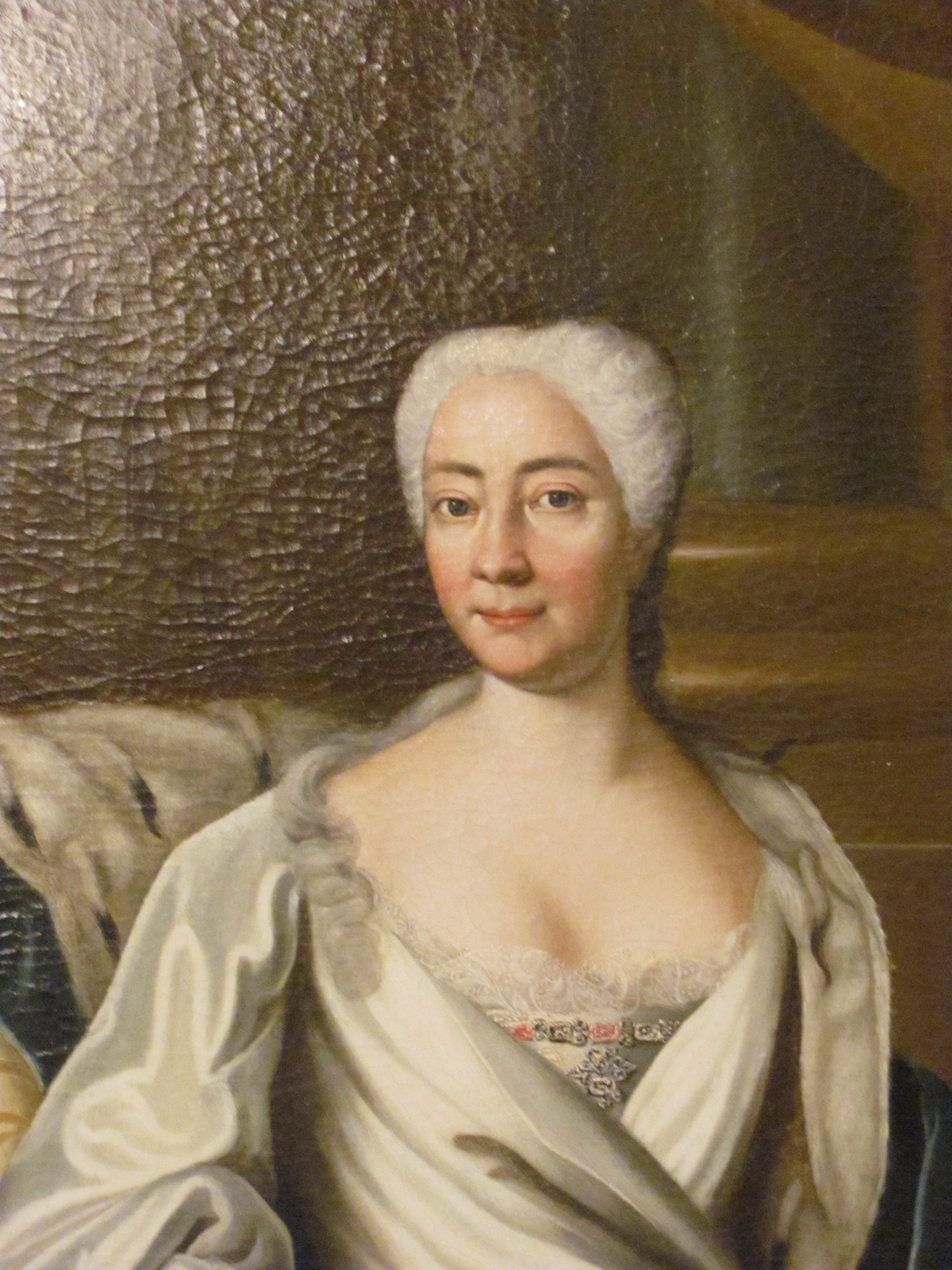
- Born: 14 June 1685; Coburg
- Died: 5 April 1767 (aged 81); Salzhaus, Hanau
- Burial: 11 April 1767; Old St. John's Church, Hanau
- Spouse: Philip Reinhard, Count of Hanau-Münzenberg
- House: Saxe-Coburg-Saalfeld (by birth); Hanau (by marriage)
- Father: John Ernest IV, Duke of Saxe-Coburg-Saalfeld
- Mother: Sophie Hedwig of Saxe-Merseburg

Princess Charlotte Wilhelmine of Saxe-Coburg-Saalfeld (14 June 1685 in Coburg - 5 April 1767 in Hanau) was a German princess by birth and Countess of Hanau-Münzenberg by marriage.

== Early life and ancestry ==
Born into the Ernestine line of the House of Wettin, Charlotte Wilhelmine was born as the youngest surviving child and daughter of John Ernest IV, Duke of Saxe-Coburg-Saalfeld, by his first wife, Duchess Sophie Hedwig of Saxe-Merseburg (1666–1686).

== Marriage and issue ==
She married Philip Reinhard, Count of Hanau-Münzenberg (1664–1712). She was his second wife and survived him by more than half a century. The dowry she brought into her marriage was 18000guilders. This marriage, however, remained childless.

=== Widowhood ===
After her husband's death, she received Babenhausen Castle as her widow seat. With the death of Johann Reinhard III, Count of Hanau-Lichtenberg, the House of Hanau died out in the male line.

The County of Hanau-Münzenberg fell to the neighboring Hesse. The territory was divided between the two lines of the House of Hesse, Hesse-Kassel and Hesse-Darmstadt.

She received the stately home Salzhaus in the old city of Hanau, where she lived as a widow for the rest of her life.

== Death ==
Duchess Charlotte Wilhelmine died on 5 April 1767, aged 81, at the Salzhaus. She was the last surviving member of the House of Hanau. Her body was interred on 11 April 1767 in the family crypt in the Lutheran Church (now called the Old St. John's Church) in Hanau. Her tomb was largely destroyed when the town was bombed during World War II.
