= Agatha Christine of Hanau-Lichtenberg =

- Coat-of-arms of Hanau-Lichtenberg.
- Born: 23 September 1632; Buchsweiler, now Bouxwiller
- Died: 5 December 1681 (aged 49); Straßburg, now Strasbourg
- Buried: Lützelstein, now La Petite-Pierre
- Noble family: House of Hanau
- Spouse: Leopold Louis, Count Palatine of Veldenz
- Father: Philip Wolfgang, Count of Hanau-Lichtenberg
- Mother: Johanna of Oettingen

Countess Agatha Christine of Hanau-Lichtenberg (23 September 1632 in Buchsweiler (now Bouxwiller in France) – 5 December 1681 in Straßburg (now Strasbourg, in France); buried in Lützelstein (now La Petite-Pierre, France)) was a daughter of Count Philip Wolfgang (1595-1641) and his wife, Countess Johanna of Oettingen (1602-1639).

Agatha Christine died on 5 December 1681 and, like many of her children and later her husband, she was buried in the parish church of Lützelstein.

== Marriage and issue ==
She married on 4 July 1648 in Bischweiler to Count Palatine Leopold Louis of Veldenz (1 February 1623 – 29 September [O.S. 19 September] 1694 in Strasbourg; also buried in Lützelstein) and had the following children:

1. unnamed daughter (1649-1649 in Lauterecken)
2. Anne Sophie (20 May 1650 in Lauterecken – 12 June 1706 in Morchingen (now Morhange, France), also buried in Lützelstein)
3. Gustav Philip (17 July 1651 in Lauterecken – 24 August 1679, allegedly murdered in Lauterecken; buried in the Lutheran church in Lauterecken)
4. Elisabeth Johanna (22 February 1653 in Lauterecken – 5 February 1718 in Morchingen; buried in Diemeringen), married on 27 July 1669 to Wild- and Rhinegrave John XI of Salm-Kyrburg (d. 16 September 1688 in Flonheim; buried in the town church in Kirn)
5. Christine (29 March 1654 in Lauterecken – 18 February 1655 in Lützelstein)
6. Christine Louise (11 November 1655 in Lützelstein – 14 April 1656, ibid.)
7. Christian Louis (5 October 1656 in Lützelstein – 15 April 1658, ibid.)
8. Dorothea (16 January 1658 in Lützelstein – 17 August 1723 in Strasbourg; buried in the parish church of Lützelstein), married on 10 July 1707 in Zweibrücken to Count Palatine Gustav of Kleeburg and Zweibrücken (1670-1731), divorced on 23 April 1723
9. Leopold Louis (14 March 1659 in Lützelstein – 17 March 1660 in Lützelstein; buried in Lützelstein)
10. Charles George (27 May 1660 in Lützelstein – 3 July 1686 outside Budapest)
11. Agatha Eleanore (29 June 1662 in Lützelstein – 1 January 1664, ibid.)
12. Augustus Leopold (22 December 1663 in Lützelstein – 9 September 1689 outside Mainz), was a colonel in the Bavarian army and was buried in the St. John's church in Hanau

== Ancestors ==
Ancestors of Agatha Christine of Hanau-Lichtenberg

8. Philip V, Count of Hanau-Lichtenberg (1541–1599)
4. Johann Reinhard I, Count of Hanau-Lichtenberg (1568–1625)
9. Ludowika Margaretha of Zweibrücken-Bitsch (1540–1569)
2. Philip Wolfgang, Count of Hanau-Lichtenberg (1595–1641)
10. Wolfgang of Hohenlohe-Neuenstein (1546–1610)
5. Maria Elisabeth of Hohenlohe-Neuenstein (1576–1605)
11. Magdalena of Nassau-Dillenburg (1547–1643)
1. Agatha Christine of Hanau-Lichtenberg
12. Gottfried of Öttingen (1554–1622)
6. Louis Eberhard of Öttingen-Öttingen (1577-1634)
13. Johanna of Hohenlohe-Neuenstein (1557–1585)
3. Johanna of Oettingen (1602–1639)
14. George III, Count of Erbach-Breuberg (1548–1605)
7. Margarethe von Erbach (1576–1636)
15. Anna of Solms (1557–1586)
