= Johann Reinhard II, Count of Hanau-Lichtenberg =

Count Johann Reinhard II
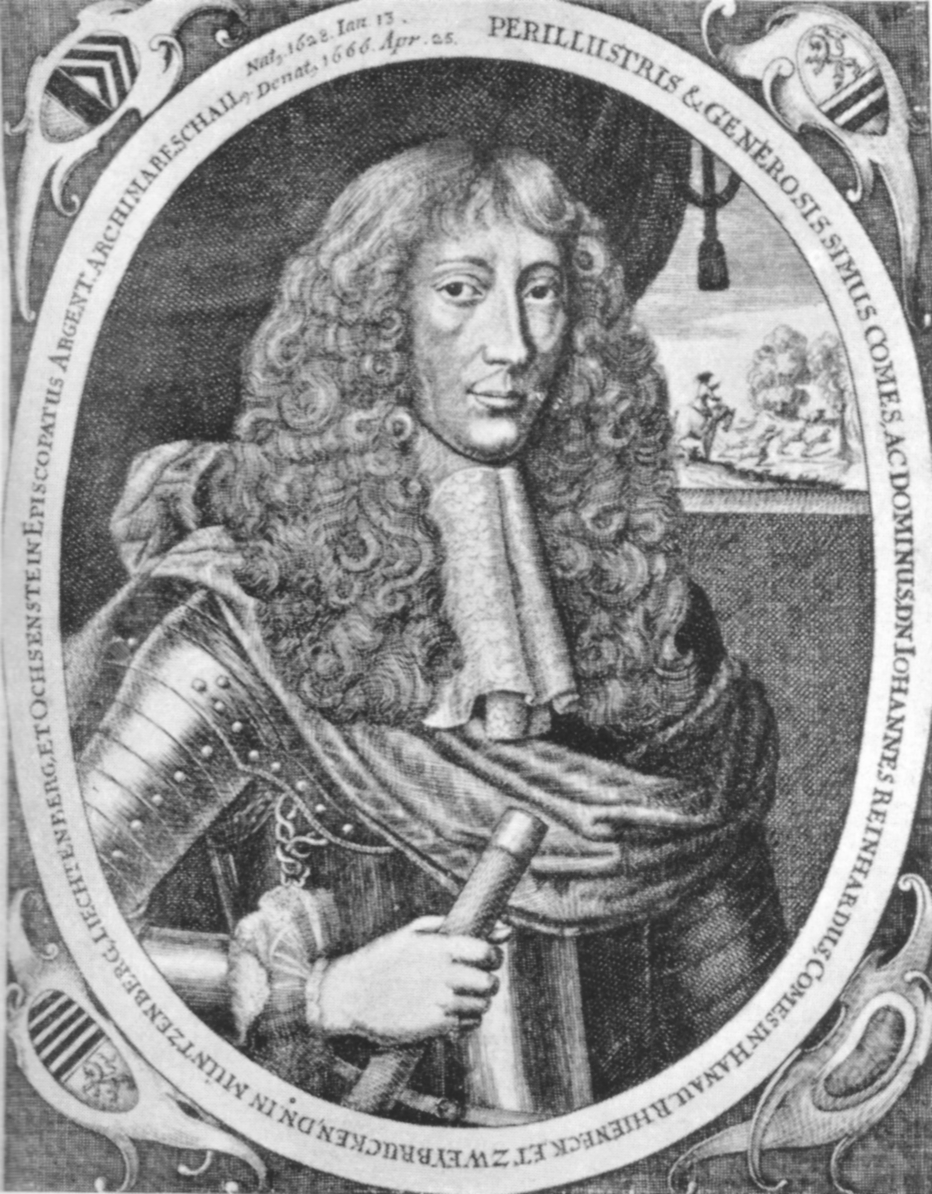
- Count Johann Reinhard II, engraving by Peter Aubrey, Strasbourg
- Born: 23 January [O.S. 13 January] 1628; Bouxwiller
- Died: 25 April 1666 (aged 38); Bischofsheim am Hohen Steg
- Buried: Lichtenberg Castle
- Noble family: Hanau
- Spouse: Anna Magdalena, Countess Palatine of Birkenfeld-Bischweiler (m. 1659)
- Issue: Johanna, Countess of Leiningen-Dagsburg-Falkenburg; Louise, Countess of Nassau-Ottweiler; Countess Franziska Albertina; Philipp Reinhard, Count of Hanau-Münzenberg; Johann Reinhard III, Count of Hanau-Lichtenberg
- Father: Philipp Wolfgang, Count of Hanau-Lichtenberg
- Mother: Johanna of Oettingen-Oettingen

Count Johann Reinhard II of Hanau-Lichtenberg (2 February [O.S. 23 January] 1628 in Bouxwiller – 25 April 1666 in Bischofsheim am Hohen Steg) was a younger son of Count Philipp Wolfgang of Hanau-Lichtenberg (1595–1641) and Countess Johanna of Oettingen-Oettingen (d. 1639).

== Ordinal number ==
Although he was a younger son and never a reigning count, he is usually referred to as Johann Reinhard (II) in the relevant literature. He was the grandson of reigning Johann Reinhard I, Count of Hanau-Lichtenberg (1559–1626) and the father of reigning Johann Reinhard III, Count of Hanau-Lichtenberg (1665–1736), but he never reigned himself. To indicate that he was not ruling Count, the ordinal number is sometimes placed in parentheses after his name.

== Life ==
He was sent, together with his brother Johann Philipp, on a Grand Tour to Germany, the Netherlands, England, France and Switzerland. He then visited the Reichstag in Nuremberg in 1650, which was devoted to the problems of enforcing the Peace of Westphalia.

His father's testament awarded him the District of Lichtenau in Hesse and Bischofsheim am Hohen Steg as a residence. In 1653, he participated in the Reichstag in Regensburg.

Johann Reinhard died on 25 April 1666 and was buried in the vault in Lichtenberg Castle. Two funeral sermons were published: one by Georg Linus, General Superintendent of the county of Hanau, with a contribution of Philipp Jacob Spener and another which included a contribution by Quirinus Moscherosch.

== Marriage and issue ==
On 19 October 1659, he married in Bischweiler (now Bischwiller, France) Countess Palatine Anna Magdalena of Birkenfeld-Bischweiler (1640–1693). They had five children:

- Johanna Magdalena (born: 18 December 1660 in Bischofsheim am Hohen Steg; died: 21 August 1715). She is said to have been buried in the St. Mary's Church in Hanau

married on 5 December 1685 to Count Johann Karl August of Leiningen-Dagsburg-Falkenburg (17 March 1662 – 3 November 1698).

- Louise Sophie (11 April 1662 in Bischofsheim am Hohen Steg – 9 April 1751 in Ottweiler)

married on 27 September 1697 to Count Friedrich Ludwig of Nassau-Saarbrücken-Ottweiler (13 November 1651 – 25 May 1728)

- Franziska Albertina (1 May 1663 in Bischofsheim am Hohen Steg – 1736 in Ottweiler); unmarried,
- Philipp Reinhard (2 August 1664 in Bischofsheim am Hohen Steg – 4 October 1712 at Philippsruhe Castle in Hanau)
- Johann Reinhard III (31 July 1665 in Bischofsheim am Hohen Steg – 28 March 1736 in Philippsruhe Castle).

Furthermore, Johann Reinhard had an extramarital affair with Maria Magdalena von Lindenau (also: Lindau). Maria Magdalena (died after 1680) was the daughter of Lieutenant Colonel von Lindenau (died: 1 December 1640) who had earlier served in the Swedish army and was appointed commander of the Fortress Hanau as successor of Johann Winter von Güldenborn (1595-1668). After his death, he was succeeded by Karl Kasimir von Landras. Johann Reinhard and Maria Magdalena had at least one son:

- Johann Reinhard von Lichtenfels (born: 1656 or earlier; died after 1689)

Johann Reinhard von Lichtenfels resided in Duisburg in 1680. The latest evidence comes from 1689. Johan Reinhard von Lichtenfels served in the military of the Roman Catholic Bishopric of Münster and died without heirs.
