= Diemeringen =

Diemeringen Dììmeringe
- Commune
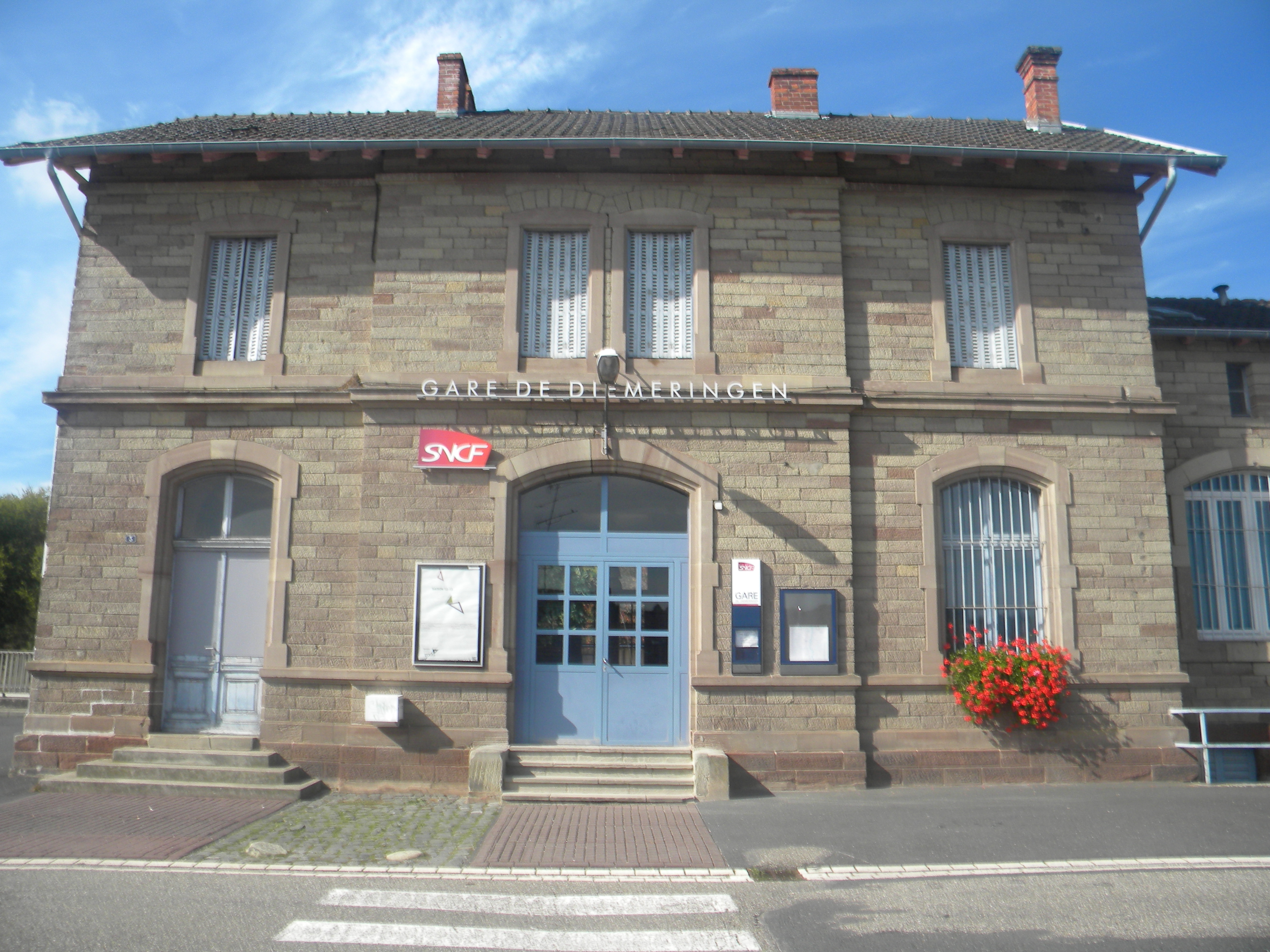
- The railway station in Diemeringen

- Coat of arms
- Location of Diemeringen
- Location within France Location within Grand Est
- Coordinates: 48°56′32″N 7°11′15″E
- Country: France
- Region: Grand Est
- Department: Bas-Rhin
- Arrondissement: Saverne
- Canton: Ingwiller

Government
  - Mayor (2020–2026): Nicole Oury
- Area^{1}: 8.81 km^{2} (3.40 sq mi)
- Highest elevation: 329 m (1,079 ft)
- Lowest elevation: 222 m (728 ft)
- Population (2023): 1,579
  - Density: 179/km^{2} (464/sq mi)
- Time zone: UTC+01:00 (CET)
  - Summer (DST): UTC+02:00 (CEST)
- INSEE/Postal code: 67095 /67430
- ^{1} French Land Register data, which excludes lakes, ponds, glaciers > 1 km^{2} (0.386 sq mi or 247 acres) and river estuaries.

Diemeringen (French pronunciation: [diməʁiŋ(ɡ)ən]) is a commune in the Bas-Rhin department in Grand Est in north-eastern France.

== Population ==
The population of Diemeringen grew steadily in the late 20th century, from 1,216 in 1968 to a peak of 1,654 in 1999, and has declined slightly since then.

Year	Population
1968	1,216
1975	1,294
1982	1,407
1990	1,542
1999	1,654
2007	1,640
2012	1,642
2017	1,600
2023	1,579

== See also ==
- Communes of the Bas-Rhin department
