= Philipp Wolfgang, Count of Hanau-Lichtenberg =

Philipp Wolfgang
- Born: 31 July 1595; Bouxwiller
- Died: 24 February [O.S. 14 February] 1641; Bouxwiller
- Buried: Lichtenberg
- Noble family: House of Hanau
- Spouses: Johanna of Oettingen; Dorothea Diana of Salm
- Father: Johann Reinhard I, Count of Hanau-Lichtenberg
- Mother: Countess Maria Elisabeth of Hohenlohe-Neuenstein-Weikersheim

Philipp Wolfgang (31 July 1595, Bouxwiller (German: Buchsweiler) – 24 February [O.S. 14 February] 1641, Bouxwiller) was a count of Hanau-Lichtenberg. He ruled the county from 1625 until his death.

== Youth ==
Philipp Wolfgang was a son of Count Johann Reinhard I of Hanau-Lichtenberg (1569–1625) and his wife Countess Maria Elisabeth of Hohenlohe-Neuenstein-Weikersheim (1576–1605). He attended the University of Strasbourg. His Grand Tour took him via Germany to France, Italy and England.

== Government ==
The focus of the government of Count Philipp Wolfgang were the problems caused by the Thirty Years' War. It is reported that he mostly led the government personally and consequently had to travel a lot. This is inconsistent with the later references, which report that he was frequently ill.

His father had initiated a relatively successful policy of neutrality. He tried to continue this policy, but failed. In 1631, the war hit the district of Babenhausen, where imperial troops occupied and looted the city and Babenhausen Castle. One year later, a Swedish army led by Wolf Heinrich von Isenburg invaded the district. Between 23 February and 28 March 1635, the city was (unsuccessfully) besieged by the imperial army, led by Philipp von Mansfeld. In 1636, the Archbishopric of Mainz occupied Babenhausen.

The Hanau-Lichtenberg possessions in the Alsace and at the Upper Rhine were also hit. The imperial troops looted and pillaged multiple villages there, too. Philipp Wolfgang's army captured imperial redoubts at Drusenau and Lichtenau. But overall, his limited means meant that he stood little chance of asserting himself successfully in this conflict. In 1633, the Swedish troops reached the Upper Rhine part of the county. They fought battles and looted in Hanau-Lichtenberg and neighbouring territories. In Pfaffenhofen, for example, only two families survived the war. Bouxwiller, “capital” of the county, was ransacked by Croat troops in 1638. The Swedes formed an alliance with the French, who then occupied Pfaffenhofen, Bouxwiller and Ingweiler. The French occupation force was attacked by imperial troops under Field Marshal Matthias Gallas. The city of Woerth was sacked twice. The next wave of incoming soldiers was the Protestant army under Duke Bernhard of Saxe-Weimar, who established his headquarters in Brumath. Bernhard of Saxe-Weimat was a competent military leader, but did not possess his own territory. It was rumoured that he intended to create a separate territory from areas he had conquered in the Alsace. This brought him into conflict with France, which wanted to annex the Alsace to itself. So Philipp Wolfgang placed himself under the protection of the French king and spent much of his time at his residence in Strasbourg for security reasons. All cities and villages in his territory were affected by the war. Like his predecessor, Philipp Wolfgang did not participate in witch hunts, which were spreading rapidly, so these were rare in Hanau-Lichtenberg.

== Death ==
In his will, Philipp Wolfgang named his eldest son Friedrich Casimir as his sole heir. His younger sons received residences, but no sovereignty. Johann Philipp received the district of Babenhausen; Johann Reinhard received Lichtenberg.

Philipp Wolfgang died on 24 February [O.S. 14 February] 1641 in Bouxwiller. He was buried in Lichtenberg.

== Marriage and issue ==
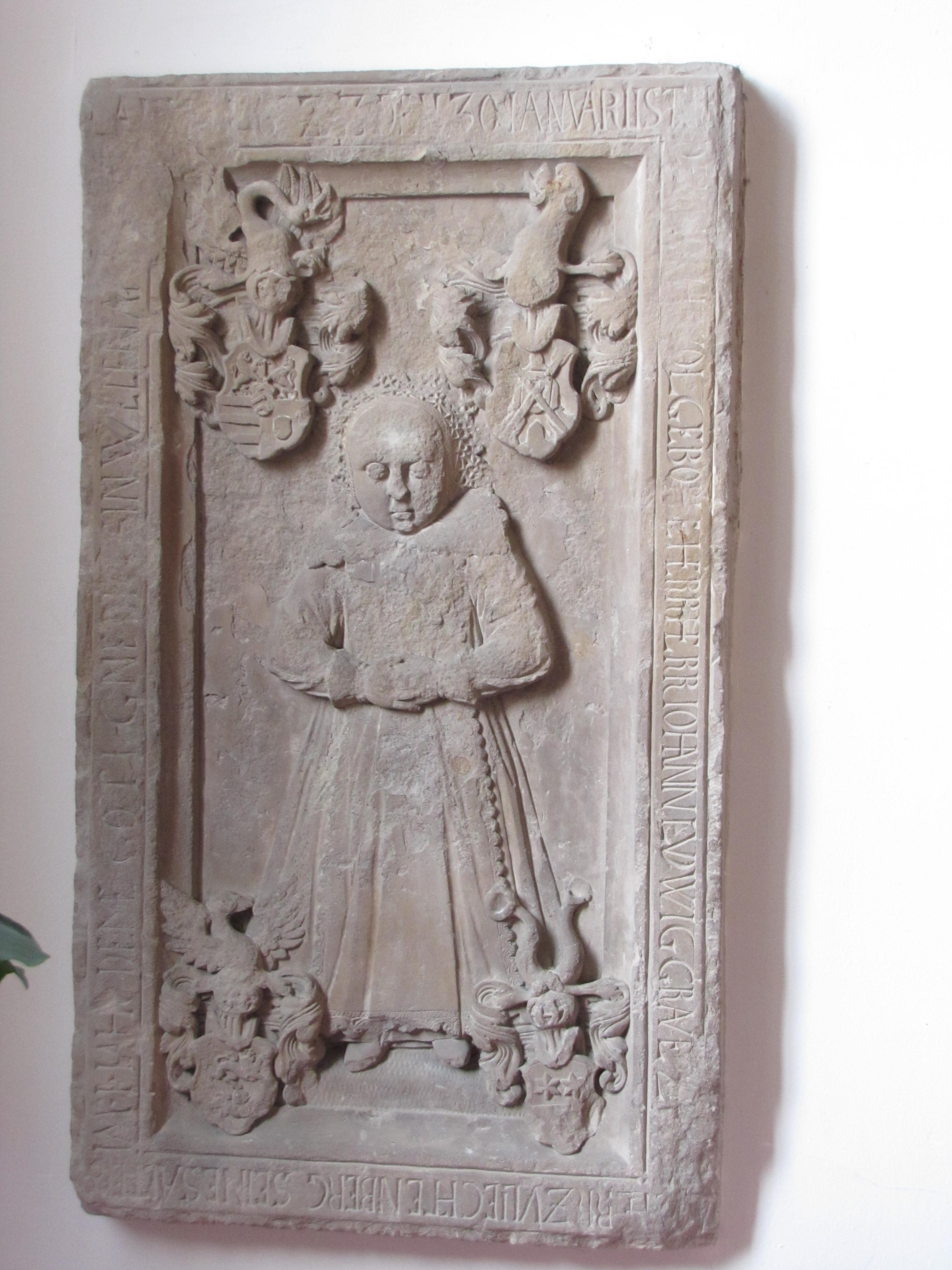
Tombstone of Count Johann Ludwig of Hanau-Lichtenberg in the City Church in Bouxwiller

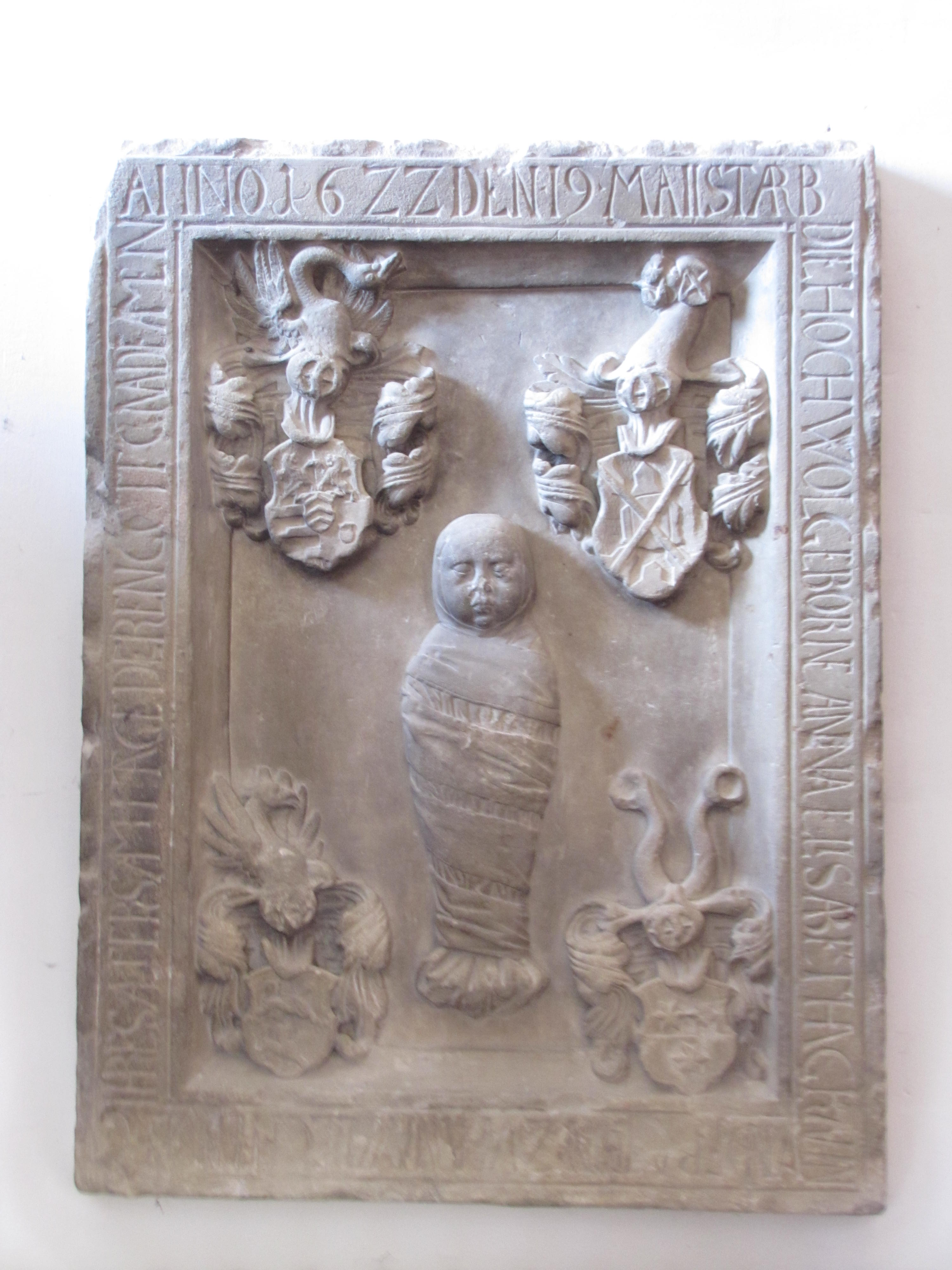
Tombstone of Countess Anna Elisabeth of Hanau-Lichtenberg in the City Church of Bouxwiller

Wolfgang Philipp married twice:

1. 15 November 1619 Countess Johanna of Oettingen (born: 30 August 1602; died: 17 September 1639 in Strasbourg, initially buried in St. Peter in Strasbourg, then transferred to Bouxwiller (German: Buchsweiler and buried with Philipp Wolfgang). In this marriage were born:
  1. Johann Ludwig (born: 14 June 1621 in Strasbourg; died: 30 January 1623 in Bouxwiller), buried in the City Church in Bouxwiller
  2. Anna Elisabeth (born: 19 May 1622 in Bouxwiller; died: 21 May 1622 in Bouxwiller), buried in the City Church in Bouxwiller
  3. Friedrich Casimir (born: 4 August 1623; died: 30 March 1685)
  4. Dorothea Elisabeth (* November 19, 1624 in Bouxwiller, died: 21 November 1624), buried in the City Church in Bouxwiller
  5. Johann Philipp (born: 23 January [O.S. 13 January] 1626 in Bouxwiller; died: 18 December 1669 in Babenhausen)
  6. Johanna Juliane (born: 4 January 1627 at Bouxwiller; died: 4 September 1628, in Bouxwiller)
  7. Johann Reinhard II (born: 23 January [O.S. 13 January] 1628 in Bouxwiller; died: 25 April 1666 in Bischofsheim am hohen Steg)
  8. Sophie Eleonore (13 April 1630 in Bouxwiller; died:30 April [O.S. 20 April] 1662 in La Petite-Pierre, buried in Bouxwiller), unmarried, lived with her sister Agatha Christine. A funeral sermon was published at her funeral.
  9. Agatha Christine (born: 23 September 1632; died: 5 December 1681), married to Leopold Louis, Count Palatine of Veldenz-Lützelstein
  10. Christian Eberhard (born: 27 July [O.S. 17 July 17] 1635 in Strasbourg, died: 4 May 1636, in Strasbourg, buried in Bouxwiller). At his funeral, a funeral sermon was published.
2. After 17 May 1640 Wild- and Rhinegravine Dorothea Diana of Salm (born: 25 July 1604 in Criechingen, died: 19 December 1672 in Wörth), widow of Count Ludwig Philipp of Rappoltstein (died: 19 December 1672). She was buried in Bouxwiller. A funeral sermon was published by Günther Heiler, Superintendent and Consistory Councillor of the county of Hanau-Lichtenberg.

== Ancestors ==
Ancestors of Philipp Wolfgang, Count of Hanau-Lichtenberg

8. Philipp IV, Count of Hanau-Lichtenberg (1514–1590)
4. Philipp V, Count of Hanau-Lichtenberg (1541–1599)
9. Eleonore of Fürstenberg (1523–1544)
2. Johann Reinhard I, Count of Hanau-Lichtenberg (1569–1625)
10. Jakob of Zweibrücken-Bitsch (1510–1570)
5. Countess Ludowika Margaretha of Zweibrücken-Bitsch (1540–1569)
11. Katharina of Honstein (d. 1570)
1. Philipp Wolfgang, Count of Hanau-Lichtenberg
12. Ludwig Casimir of Hohenlohe-Neuenstein-Langenburg (1517–1568)
6. Wolfgang von Hohenlohe-Neuenstein-Weikersheim (1546–1610)
13. Anna of Solms-Laubach(1522–1594)
3. Maria Elisabeth of Hohenlohe-Neuenstein-Weikersheim (1576–1605)
14. William I, Count of Nassau-Siegen (1487-1559)
7. Magdalene von Nassau-Dillenburg (1547–1633)
15. Juliana of Stolberg (1506–1580)

== Footnotes ==
Philipp Wolfgang, Count of Hanau-Lichtenberg House of Hanau Born: 31 July 1595 Died: 24 February 1641
| Preceded by Johann Reinhard I | Count of Hanau-Lichtenberg; 1625–1641 | Succeeded by Friedrich Casimir |
