= Babenhausen, Hesse =

Babenhausen
- Town
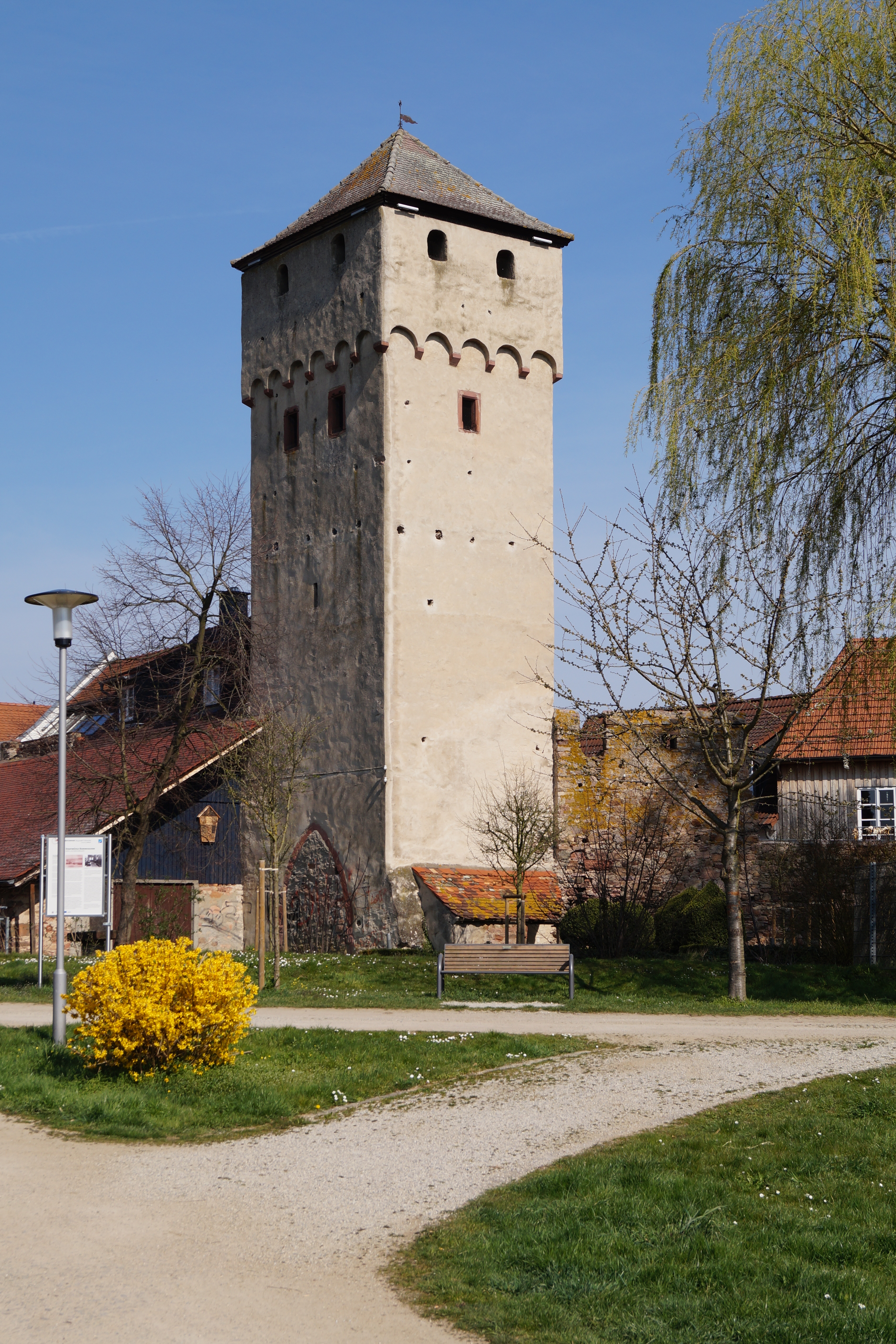
- Witch's tower

- Coat of arms

- Location of Babenhausen within Darmstadt-Dieburg district
- Interactive map of Babenhausen
- Location within Germany Location within Hesse
- Coordinates: 49°58′N 8°57′E
- Country: Germany
- State: Hesse
- Admin. region: Darmstadt
- District: Darmstadt-Dieburg
- Subdivisions: 6

Government
  - Mayor (2020–26): Dominik Stadler (Ind.)

Area
  - Total: 66.85 km^{2} (25.81 sq mi)
- Elevation: 127 m (417 ft)

Population (2025-12-31)
  - Total: 17,778
  - Density: 265.9/km^{2} (688.8/sq mi)
- Time zone: UTC+01:00 (CET)
  - Summer (DST): UTC+02:00 (CEST)
- Postal codes: 64832
- Dialling codes: 06073
- Vehicle registration: DA or DI
- Website: www.babenhausen.de

Babenhausen (German pronunciation: [baːbm̩ˈhaʊzn̩]) is a town in the Darmstadt-Dieburg district, in Hesse, Germany.

== Geography ==
It is situated on the river Gersprenz, 25 km southeast of Frankfurt, and 14 km west of Aschaffenburg. South of its general borders, the mountain range of the Odenwald is situated about 15 km away. The landscape is rather flat due to the landscape forming process of the Gersprenz and other small rivers. Some sections along the Gersprenz are set aside as nature reserves with valuable plants and animals, e.g. the white stork or the kingfisher. The forests in the municipal area are mostly pine woods on ice-age dunes with heath fields. The sandy soil is regionally famous for growing white asparagus.

== History ==
The town of Babenhausen includes a medieval core with a castle (12-13th century), numerous old houses and a large part of the city wall (1445). Babenhausen was chartered as a town in 1295. It belonged first to the Lords of Hanau-Münzenberg and was – after the last male descendant of this family died - inherited by the Lords of Hanau in the 13th century. In 1458 a minor line of them (first called Hanau-Babenhausen, later called Hanau-Lichtenberg) founded a county (they had received the title of Graf (Count) in 1429) on its own within the town and its district. In 1736 the last of the family died and the two potential inheritors, the Landgraves of Hesse-Darmstadt and of Hesse-Kassel (or Hesse-Cassel) nearly went to war over it. It took 35 years to settle the conflict and to arrange a compromise under which the town of Babenhausen came to Hesse-Kassel. But this was soon revised by the territorial rearrangements during and after Napoleonic times: From the beginning 19th century Babenhausen belonged to Hesse-Darmstadt. In the aftermath of World War II Babenhausen was the site of a UNRRA-sponsored DP camp.

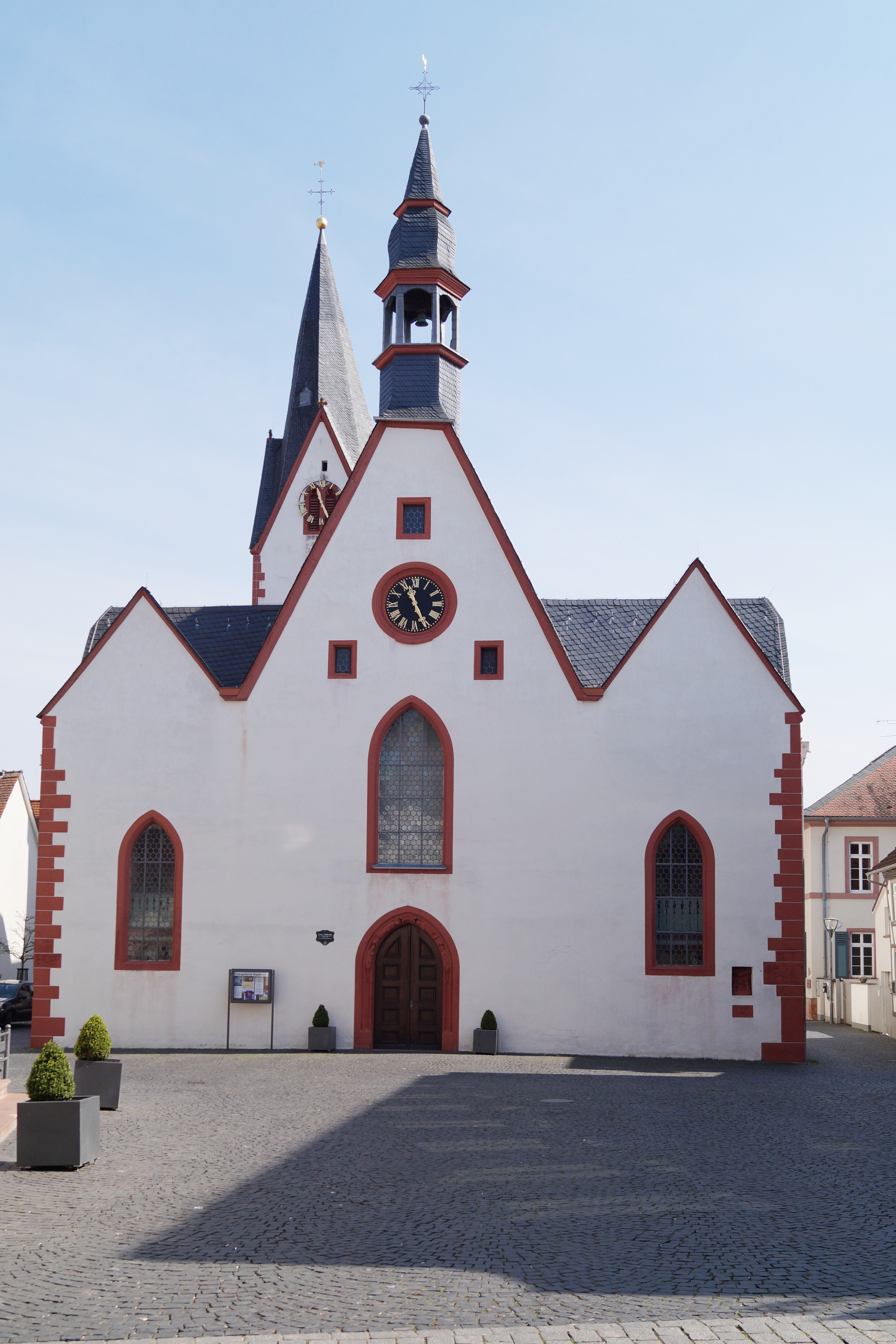
Church and market place

== Population development ==
Number of inhabitants:

- 1786: 1,033
- 1800: 1,192
- 1861: 2,072
- 1890: 2,484
- 1900: 2,255
- 1939: 3,143
- 1948: 3,702
- 1970: 7,240
- 2012: 15,588
- 2014: 15,716

== Politics ==
After the revision of districts and their borders in the state of Hesse in 1974 the following villages were added to the area of the town of Babenhausen.

1. Harreshausen
2. Harpertshausen
3. Sickenhofen
4. Langstadt

The US military installation in Babenhausen, Babenhausen Kaserne, formerly home of the 41st Field Artillery Brigade, the 77th Maintenance Company, the 1st Battalion 27th Field Artillery (MLRS) and two Patriot Missile units (D and E Batteries) of the 5th Battalion 7th Air Defense Artillery Regiment, was closed and returned to the control of the German government in 2007. In the early '60s, it was the home of the 1st Missile Battalion 38th Artillery (Corporal) and its supporting Ordnance Detachment, the 157th Ord Det.

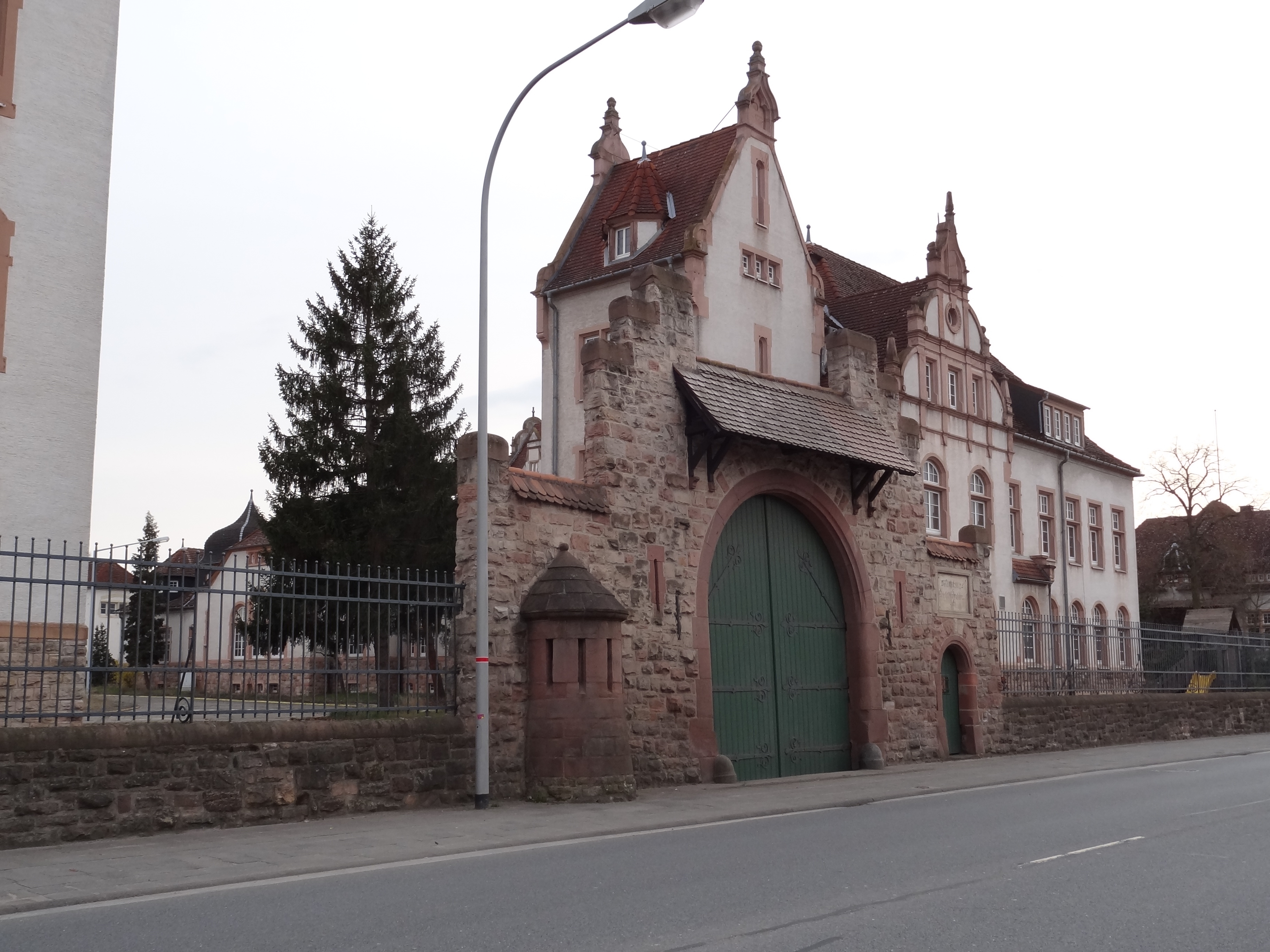
US Army Babenhausen Kaserne Gate 2013

== Mayor ==
Dominik Stadler (independent) was elected mayor in November 2020 with 54.9% of the votes.

== Sons and daughters of the town ==
- Wilhelm Grünewald (1859-1925), German politician (Progressive People's Party, DDP) member of Landtag (Hesse), member of the Weimar National Assembly
- Oskar Hock (1898-1976), German physician, NSDAP functionary, SS Brigade commander and major general of the Waffen SS
- Eugen Jochum (1902-1987), was one of the great conductors of the 20th century.
- Heinrich Klein (1932-1989) Gross-Umstadt), was from 1970 to 1976 District Administrator of the Dieburg district and 1976-1989 member of the Bundestag
- Johann Adam Oest (born 1946), German actor
- Heinrich Leonhard Kolb (born 1956), politician (FDP), Member of the Bundestag 1990-2013
