= Rheinau (Baden) =

- City
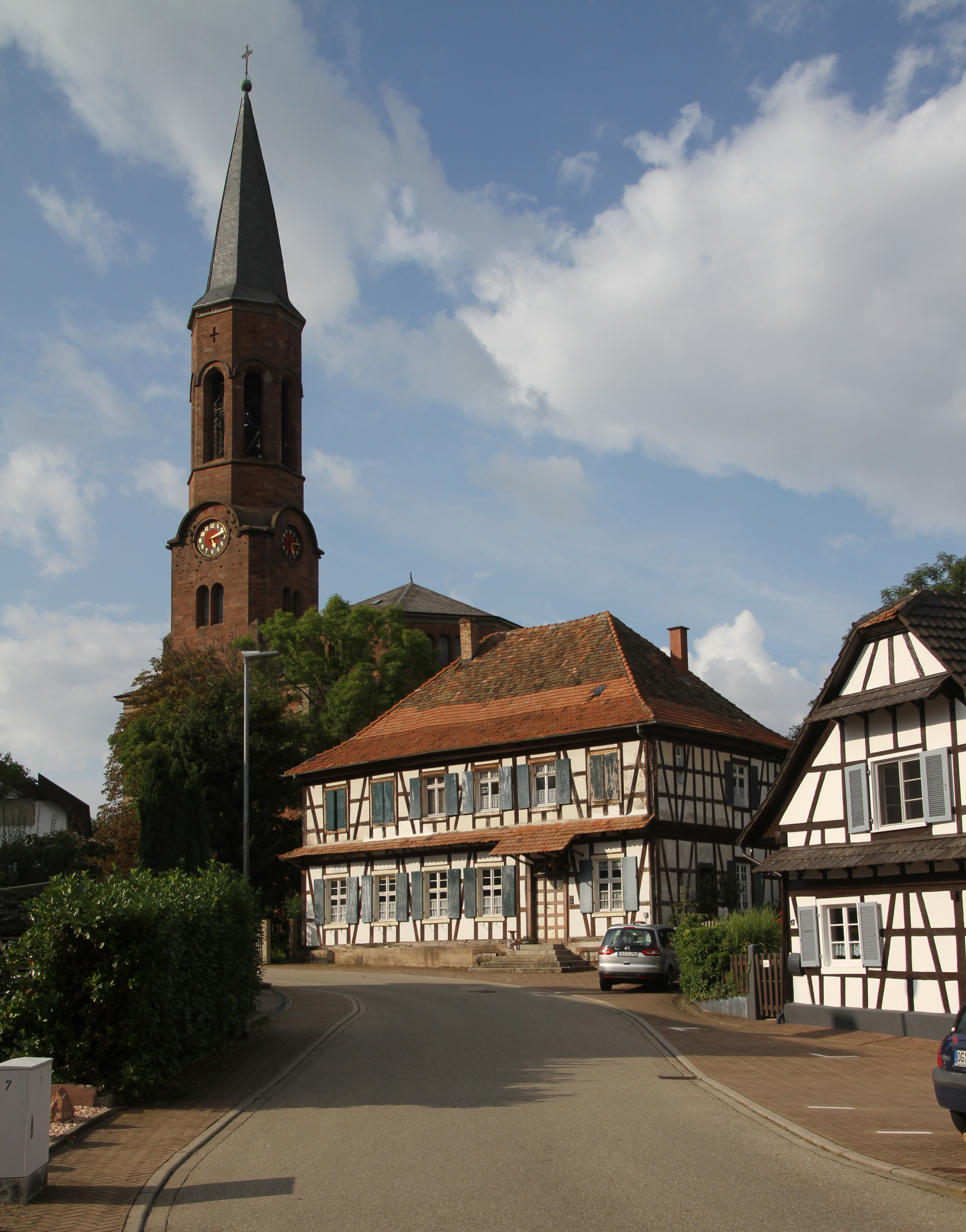
- Rheinau-Rheinbischofsheim, protestant church

- Coat of arms

- Location of Rheinau within Ortenaukreis district
- Interactive map of Rheinau
- Location within Germany Location within Baden-Württemberg
- Coordinates: 48°40′04″N 07°56′05″E
- Country: Germany
- State: Baden-Württemberg
- Admin. region: Freiburg
- District: Ortenaukreis

Government
  - Mayor (2023–31): Oliver Rastetter (CDU)

Area
  - Total: 73.5 km^{2} (28.4 sq mi)
- Elevation: 130 m (430 ft)

Population (2025-12-31)
  - Total: 11,374
  - Density: 155/km^{2} (401/sq mi)
- Time zone: UTC+01:00 (CET)
  - Summer (DST): UTC+02:00 (CEST)
- Postal codes: 77866
- Dialling codes: 07844 / 07227 / 07853
- Vehicle registration: OG, BH, KEL, LR, WOL
- Website: www.rheinau.de

Rheinau (German pronunciation: [ˈʁaɪnaʊ]; Low Alemannic: Rhinai) is a city in southwestern Baden-Württemberg, Germany and is part of the district of Ortenau. It is situated directly on the Rhine River, which forms the border with France, approximately 10 kilometers north of Kehl and 15 kilometers east of Strasbourg. The modern municipality was established in 1975 through the merger of nine former independent villages, including Freistett, Helmlingen, and Rheinbischofsheim. Rheinau is known locally for its annual asparagus festival (Spargelfest), reflecting the region's agricultural tradition of cultivating white asparagus.

== Geography ==
Rheinau is located in the Upper Rhine River Plains directly on the Rhine and as such at the German-French border. The center of town is located immediately on the Rhine crossing to France and the southern borough of Linx is located not far from Kehl and Strasbourg.

=== Neighbouring communities ===
Rheinau shares common borders with the following cities and towns, listed clockwise from the north: Lichtenau (district of Rastatt), Achern, Renchen, Appenweier and Kehl (all in the district of Ortenau) and the Alsatian towns of Gambsheim and La Wantzenau.

=== Boroughs ===
Rheinau is made up of the boroughs of Freistett (Hauptort and administrative seat of Rheinau with city hall), Diersheim, Hausgereut, Helmlingen, Holzhausen, Honau, Linx, Memprechtshofen and Rheinbischofsheim.

Boroughs of Rheinau

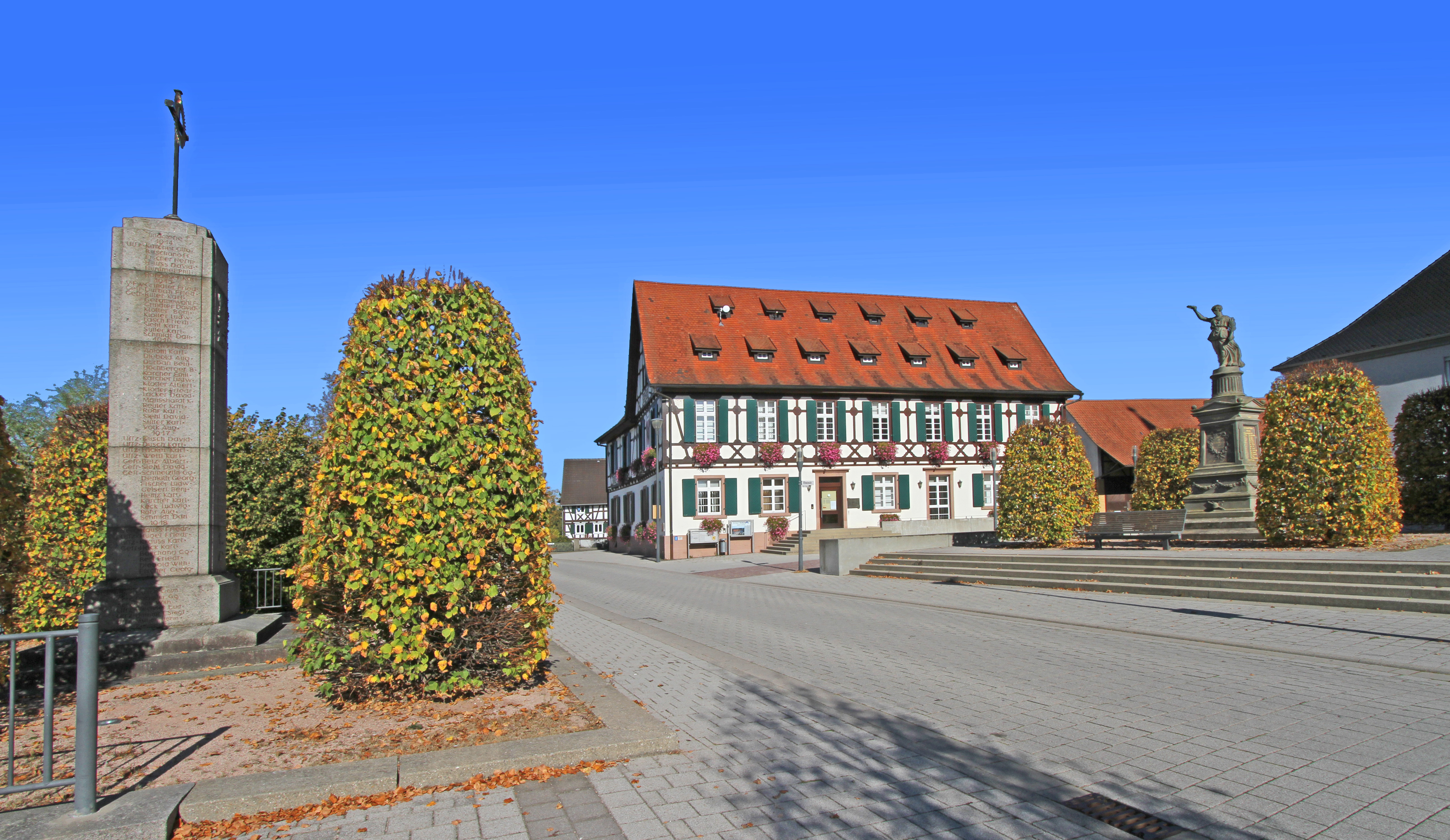
Freistett

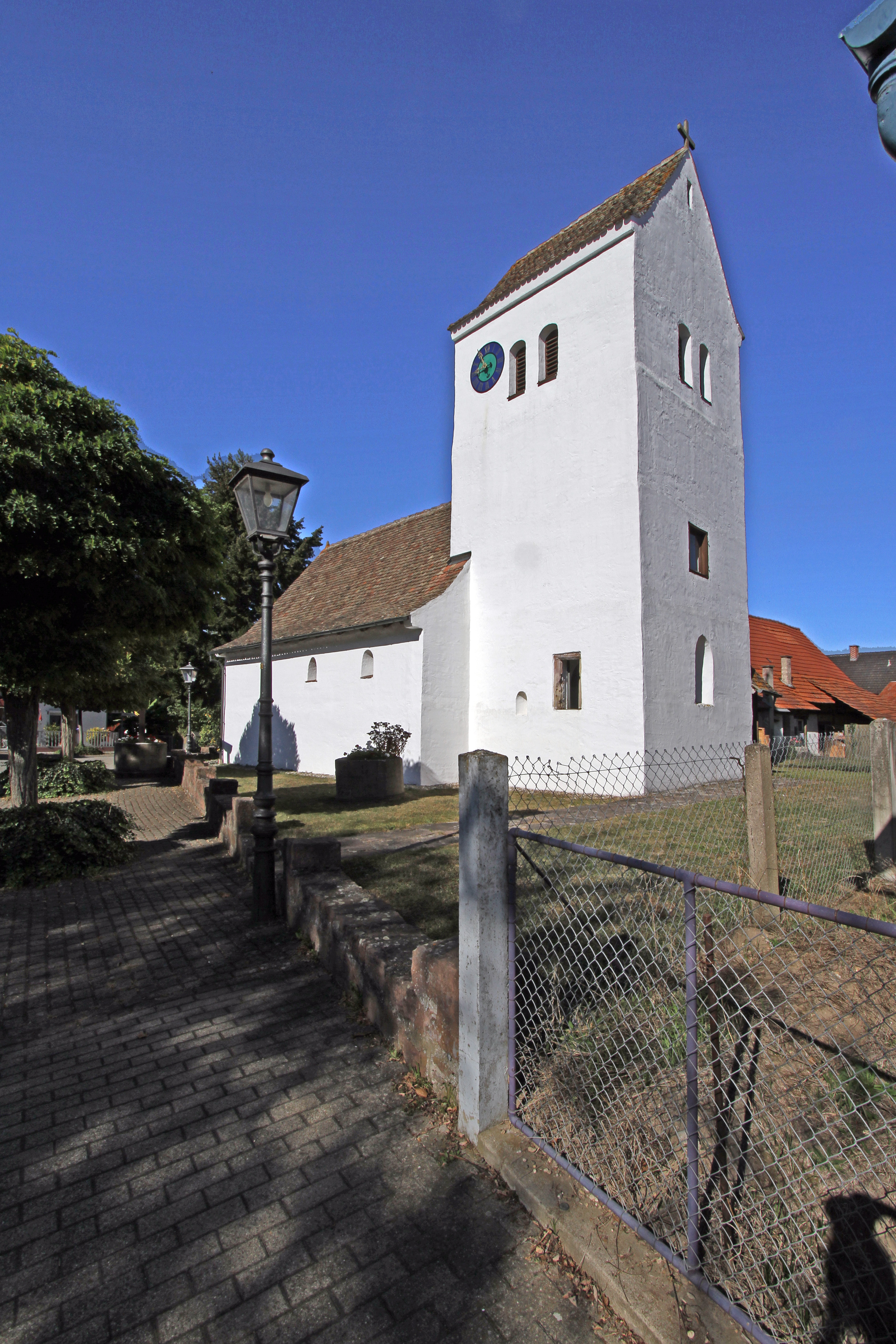
Freistett

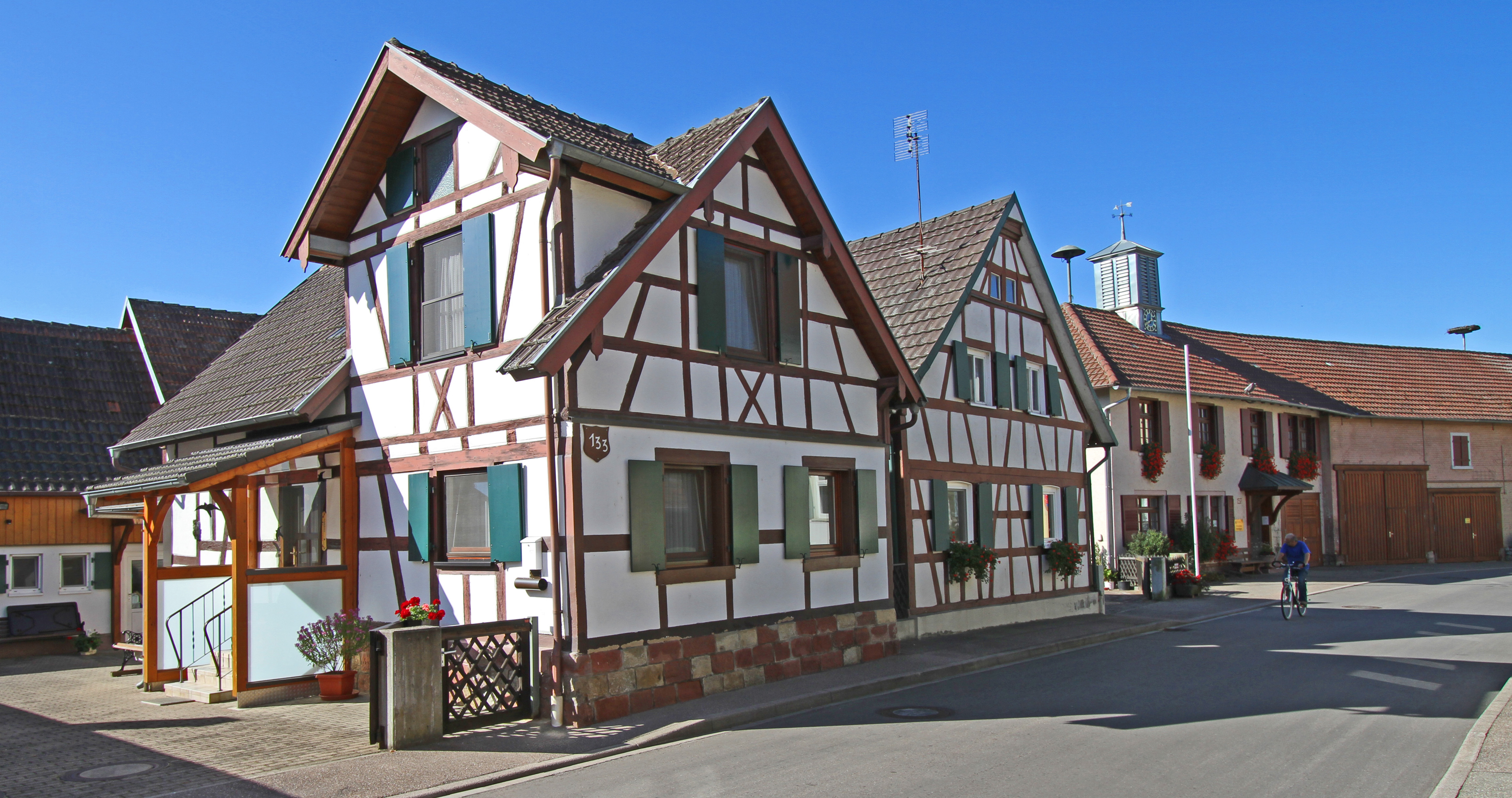
Helmlingen

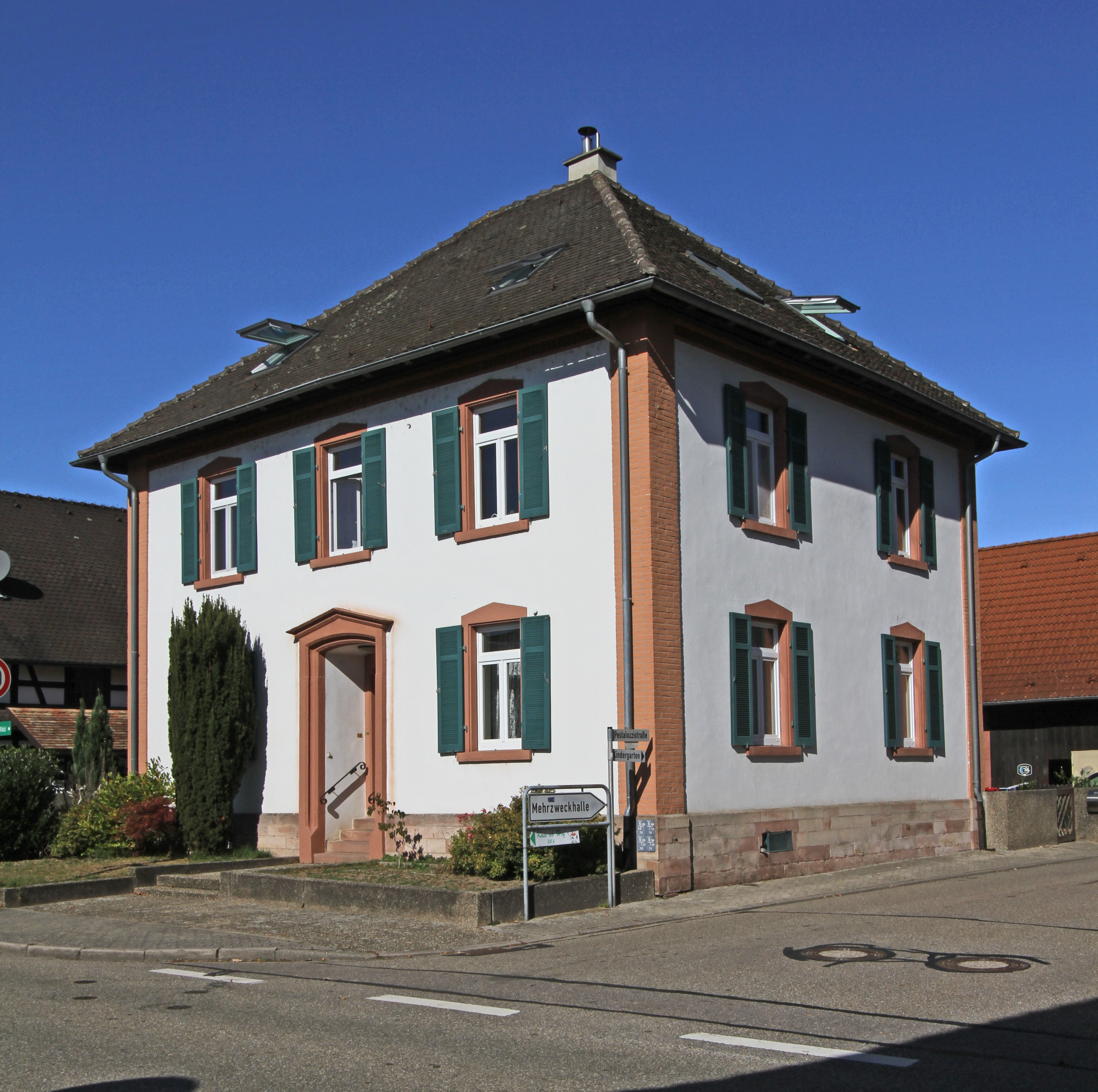
Memprechtshofen

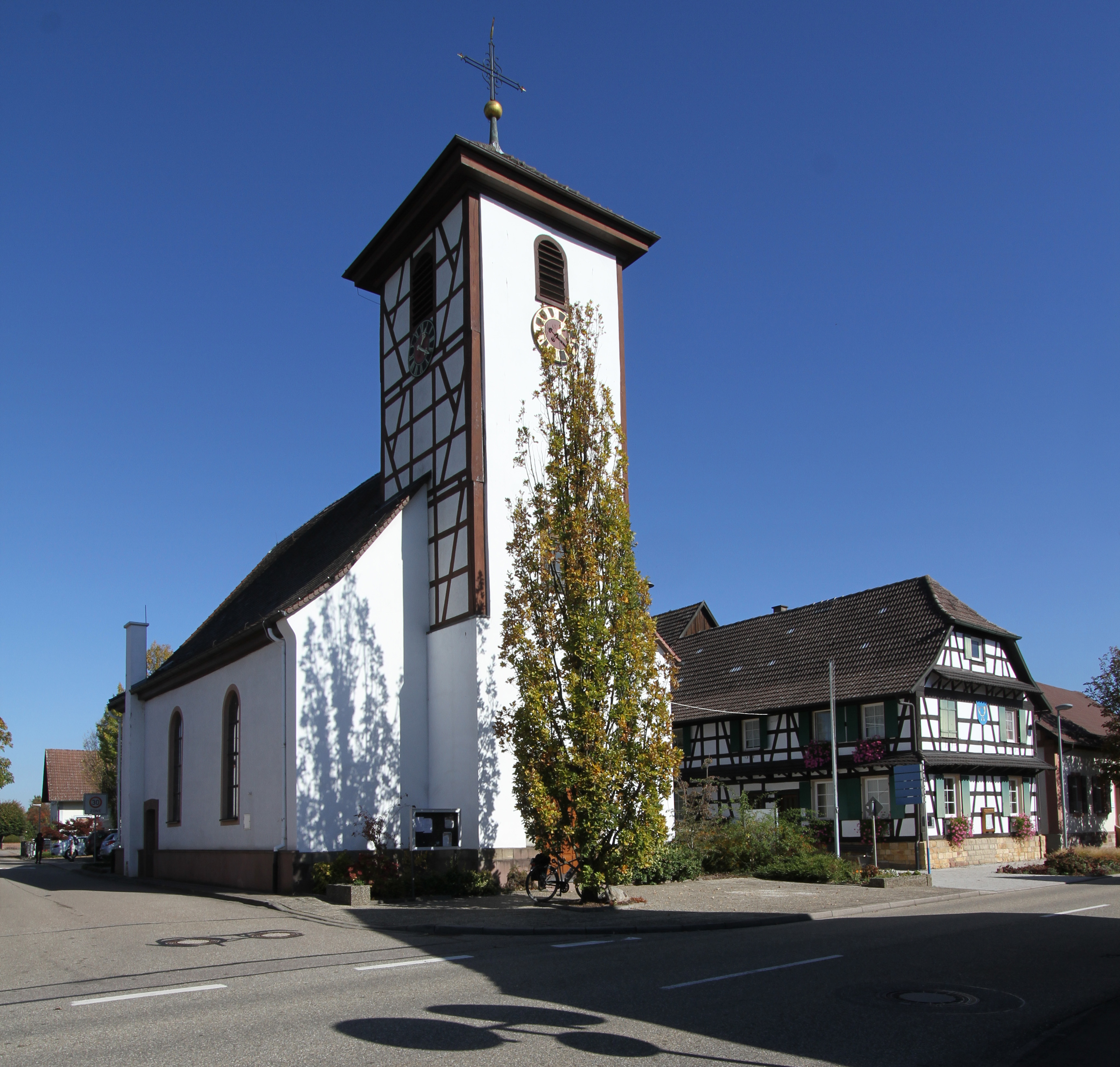
Memprechtshofen

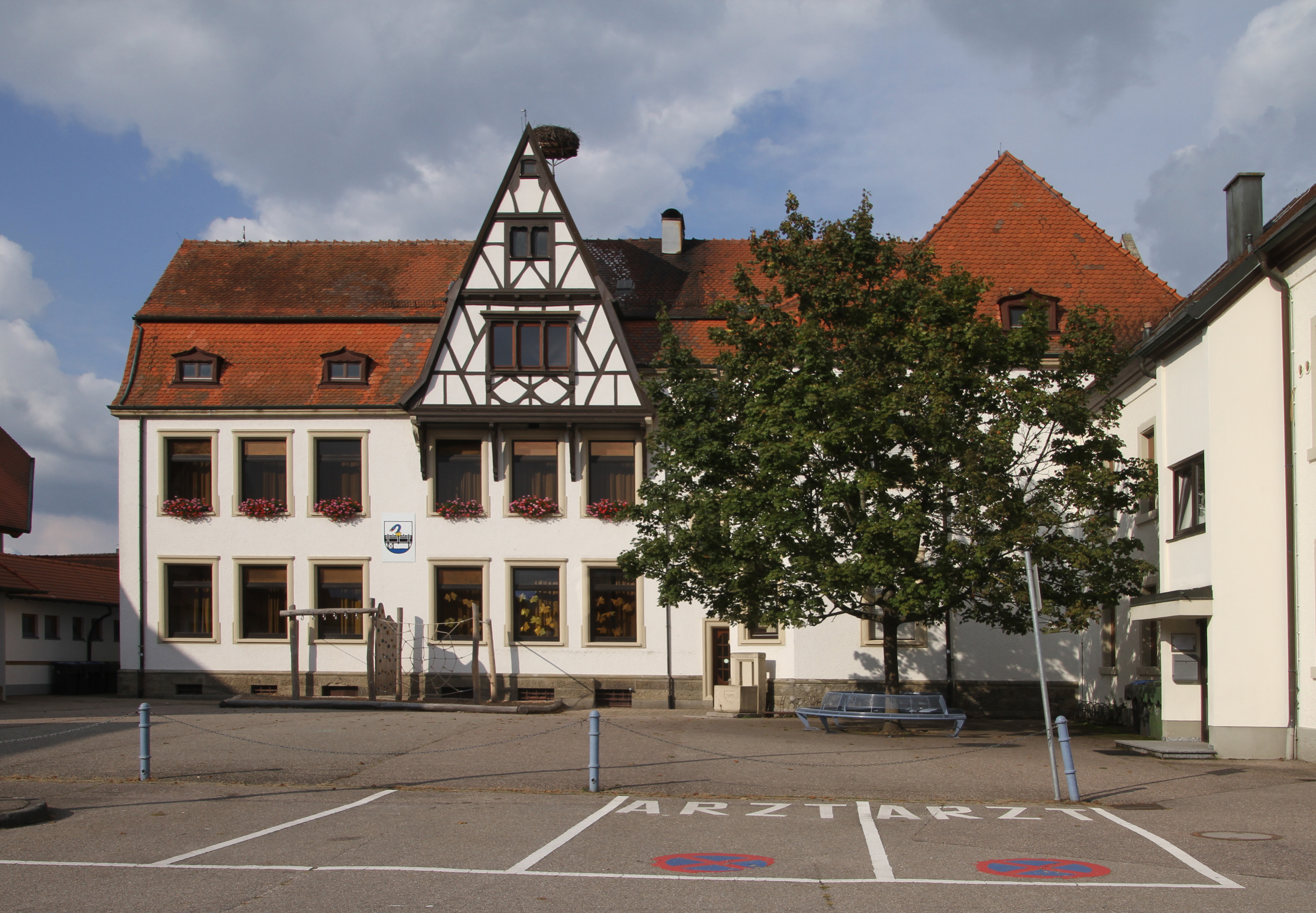
Rheinbischofsheim

== History ==
The town of Rheinau was created during the Baden-Württemberg district reform in January 1975 through the combination of the formerly independent municipalities of Freistett, Rheinbischofsheim and Honau.

== Local council (Elections in May 2014) ==
- SPD = 11 seats
- IG Handel = 4 seats
- CDU = 12 seats
- Total = 27 seats

== Churches ==
- Lutheran Church Rheinbischhofsheim: 56 m high, largest church in the area, built in 1876, remodeled in 1998
- Heidenkirchl (in Freistett)
- St. Nikolaus Church

== Economy and infrastructure ==
=== Infrastructure ===
Rheinau is connected to Achern, Bühl and Kehl by bus lines and belongs to the Public Transportation Authority of the district of Ortenau.
