= Deaths in June 2012 =

The following is a list of notable deaths in June 2012.

Entries for each day are listed alphabetically by surname. A typical entry lists information in the following sequence:

- Name, age, country of citizenship and reason for notability, established cause of death, reference (and language of reference, if not English).

== June 2012 ==
=== 1 ===
- Lamu Amatya, 80, first Nepalese trained–nurse, Alzheimer's disease.
- Faruq Z. Bey, 70, American jazz saxophonist, emphysema.
- Pádraig Faulkner, 94, Irish politician, TD for Louth (1957–1987), Minister for Defence (1979–1980), Ceann Comhairle (1980–1981).
- Milan Gaľa, 59, Slovak politician.
- Avram Goldstein, 92, American pharmacologist.
- Marcial Gómez Parejo, 81, Spanish Andalusian painter and illustrator.
- Nick Knilans, 94, American bomber pilot.
- Marion Sandler, 81, American businesswoman (Golden West Financial).
- Jörg Schmeisser, 70, German-Australian printmaker.
- Brahmeshwar Singh, 67, Indian militia chief, head of Ranvir Sena, shooting.
- Juozas Tunaitis, 83, Lithuanian Roman Catholic prelate, Auxiliary Bishop of Vilnius (1991–2010).

=== 2 ===
- Eliseo Nicolás Alonso, 57, Spanish woodcarver.
- Elnur Aslanov, 29, Azerbaijani wrestler, car accident.
- Avraham Botzer, 83, Israeli general, Commander of the Navy (1968–1972).
- Adolfo Calero, 80, Nicaraguan businessman, leader of the Democratic Force, pneumonia and kidney failure.
- Richard Dawson, 79, English-born American actor (Hogan's Heroes) and host (Family Feud), esophageal cancer.
- L. K. Doraiswamy, 85, Indian chemical engineer, author and academic, heart ailments.
- LeRoy Ellis, 72, American basketball player (Los Angeles Lakers, Philadelphia 76ers, Baltimore Bullets), prostate cancer.
- Héctor García Cobo, 88, Mexican photo-journalist.
- David C. Garrett Jr., 90, American businessman, CEO of Delta Air Lines.
- Jan Gmelich Meijling, 76, Dutch politician, Mayor of Castricum (1978–1985) and Den Helder (1985–1994), State Secretary for Defence (1994–1998).
- Kathryn Joosten, 72, American actress (Desperate Housewives, The West Wing, Bedtime Stories), Emmy winner (2005, 2008), lung cancer.
- Frazier Mohawk, 71, American record producer (Buffalo Springfield, The Byrds).
- Soini Nikkinen, 88, Finnish Olympic javelin thrower and world record holder.
- Marco Onorato, 59, Italian cinematographer.
- Oliver, app. 55, Congolese-born common chimpanzee noted for his upright stature and humanlike traits.
- Genichi Taguchi, 88, Japanese engineer and statistician.

=== 3 ===
- Carol Ann Abrams, 69, American film producer (The Ernest Green Story) and author, cancer.
- Bob Bill, 72, American football player and businessman, heart failure.
- Peter Orlebar Bishop, 94, Australian neurophysiologist.
- Angelo Di Castro, 86, Italian sculptor.
- James L. Foreman, 85, American judge.
- Rosa Guy, 89, Trinidadian-born American author, cancer.
- Andy Hamilton, 94, Jamaican-born British saxophonist and composer.
- Rajsoomer Lallah, 79, Mauritian lawyer and judge.
- Alphonse Le Gastelois, 97, British recluse.
- John Lang, 84, British Anglican priest and broadcaster, Dean of Lichfield (1980–1993).
- Mary Perry, 69, American Olympic volleyball player, neurodegenerative disease.
- Hugh Poole, 86, New Zealand Olympic sailor.
- Jean-Louis Richard, 85, French film director.
- Roy Salvadori, 90, British Formula One race car driver.
- Sir Brian Talboys, 90, New Zealand politician, MP for Wallace (1957–1981), Deputy Prime Minister (1975–1981).
- Sergio Tedesco, 84, Italian actor, voice actor and tenor.
- Roel de Wit, 85, Dutch politician, Mayor of Alkmaar (1970–1976), Queen's Commissioner of North Holland (1976–1992).
- Notable people killed in the crash of Dana Air Flight 0992:
  - Levi Chibuike Ajuonuma, 60, Nigerian academic, journalist and public relations expert.
  - Ibrahim Damcida, 78–79, Nigerian civil servant.
  - Celestine Onwuliri, 60, Nigerian academician.

=== 4 ===
- Peter Beaven, 86, New Zealand architect, cancer.
- J. C. Bhattacharyya, 81, Indian astronomer.
- Bobby Black, 85, Scottish football player.
- Pedro Borbón, 65, Dominican Republic-born American baseball player (Cincinnati Reds), cancer.
- Dennis Eugene Breedlove, 72, American botanist, herbarium curator, and plant collector.
- Tom Cryer, 62, American lawyer.
- Jim Fitzgerald, 86, American businessman, majority owner of the Milwaukee Bucks (1976–1985) and Golden State Warriors (1986–1995).
- Ireneo García Alonso, 89, Spanish Roman Catholic prelate, Bishop of Albacete (1968–1980).
- Barney Gibbens, 77, British businessman.
- Bernard Jean, 87, Canadian lawyer and politician, member (1960–1970) and Speaker (1963–1966) of the Legislative Assembly of New Brunswick.
- Stan Jolley, 86, American art director and production designer (Witness, Superman, Caddyshack).
- Eduard Khil, 77, Russian singer ("Trololo"), stroke.
- Abu Yahya al-Libi, 49, Libyan terrorist, senior member of al-Qaeda, drone strike.
- Lim Hock Siew, 81, Singaporean doctor, politician, and political prisoner.
- Rodolfo Quezada Toruño, 80, Guatemalan Roman Catholic prelate, Cardinal Archbishop of Guatemala (2001–2010), intestinal blockage.
- Herb Reed, 83, American singer (The Platters).
- Philip Snow, 96, British cricketer and administrator.
- Per Sunderland, 87, Norwegian actor.
- Barry Unsworth, 81, British novelist, lung cancer.

=== 5 ===
- Carl Bledsoe, 88, American politician, Colorado State Representative (1973–1991).
- Ray Bradbury, 91, American author (Fahrenheit 451, Something Wicked This Way Comes, Dandelion Wine).
- Steve Buttle, 59, English football player and coach, cancer.
- Keith Coster, 92, South African army officer.
- Richard Duc, 77, French rower.
- Guy Elmour, New Caledonian football manager.
- Shapoor Gharib, 78–79, Iranian director and screenplay writer.
- John Hinrichs, 78, American welding engineer, idiopathic pulmonary fibrosis.
- David Hodgson, 73, Australian judge.
- Caroline John, 71, British actress (Doctor Who, Love Actually, The Doctors).
- Hal Keller, 83, American baseball player (Washington Senators) and executive (Seattle Mariners, Texas Rangers), esophageal cancer.
- Lucky Diamond, app. 15, American Maltese dog, Guinness World Record holder (dog most photographed with celebrities), cancer.
- Mihai Pătrașcu, 29, Romanian computer scientist, brain cancer.
- Athinodoros Prousalis, 86, Greek film and television actor, heart attack.
- Charlie Sutton, 88, Australian football player and coach (Footscray).
- Chris Thompson, 52, English footballer.
- Toofan, 65, Iranian singer

=== 6 ===
- Frank Barsotti, 74, American photographer.
- Mohamed Elrawi, 77, Egyptian academic.
- Lillian Gallo, 84, American television producer.
- Jiang Minkuan, 82, Chinese politician, Governor of Sichuan.
- Vladimir Krutov, 52, Russian ice hockey player (CSKA Moscow, Vancouver Canucks) and Olympic medal-winner (1980, 1984, 1988), internal bleeding and liver failure.
- Li Wangyang, 62, Chinese labour rights activist, hanging.
- Jean-Louis Loday, 66, French mathematician.
- Nolan Miller, 79, American fashion designer, lung cancer.
- Manuel Preciado Rebolledo, 54, Spanish football player and coach (Sporting Gijón, Racing Santander), heart attack.
- Agostinho José Sartori, 83, Brazilian Roman Catholic prelate, Bishop of Palmas–Francisco Beltrão (1970–2005), complications of Parkinson's and Alzheimer's diseases.
- Prince Tomohito of Mikasa, 66, Japanese royal, cancer.
- Mykola Volosyanko, 40, Ukrainian football player, heart failure.

=== 7 ===
- Walter Becker, 79, German racing cyclist.
- F. Herbert Bormann, 90, American ecologist, discovered acid rain.
- William Cartwright, 89, Bahamian politician and publisher, co-founder of the Progressive Liberal Party.
- John T. Cunningham, 96, American historian, journalist, and writer.
- Richard N. Dixon, 74, American politician.
- David Gibson, 76, English cricketer.
- Peter Gray, 85, British chemist.
- Ping-ti Ho, 95, Chinese-born American historian.
- Mervin Jackson, 65, American basketball player (Utah Stars).
- Abid Hamid Mahmud, 55, Iraqi military officer, bodyguard and personal secretary of Saddam Hussein, execution by hanging.
- John Medlin, 78, American banker, CEO of Wachovia (1977–1993), heart attack.
- Cotton Owens, 88, American Hall of Fame NASCAR driver and owner, lung cancer.
- J. Michael Riva, 63, American production designer (The Color Purple, A Few Good Men, Iron Man), stroke.
- Rupert Scotland, 74, Bermudian cricketer.
- Chuck Share, 85, American basketball player (Fort Wayne Pistons, St. Louis Hawks, Minneapolis Lakers).
- Phillip V. Tobias, 86, South African palaeoanthropologist.
- Robert L. Washington III, 47, American comic book writer, co-creator of Static.
- Bob Welch, 66, American musician (Fleetwood Mac, Paris) and songwriter ("Sentimental Lady"), suicide by gunshot.

=== 8 ===
- Luis Aloy, 82, Spanish football player (FC Barcelona, Real Oviedo).
- Baku Akae, 79, Japanese novelist.
- Pete Brennan, 75, American basketball player (New York Knicks), prostate cancer.
- Frank Cady, 96, American actor (Green Acres, The Adventures of Ozzie and Harriet, Petticoat Junction).
- K. S. R. Das, 76, Indian film director.
- Wilf Doyle, 87, Canadian musician.
- Jane Evans, 65, New Zealand artist.
- Bengt Fröbom, 85, Swedish Olympic cyclist.
- Robert Galley, 91, French politician, Mayor of Troyes (1972–1995), Minister of Transport (1972–1973), Compagnon de la Libération.
- Nikolay Ivanov, 62, Russian Olympic gold medal-winning (1976) rower.
- Tom Kamara, 62-63, Liberian journalist.
- Ivan Lessa, 77, Brazilian journalist, pulmonary emphysema.
- Pat Mahoney, 83, Canadian businessman, politician, and judge, MP for Calgary South (1968–1972), General Manager of the Calgary Stampeders (1965).
- Sepp Maier, 77, German Olympic skier.
- Charles E. M. Pearce, 72, New Zealand-born Australian mathematician, traffic collision.
- Ghassan Tueni, 86, Lebanese journalist and politician, Ambassador to the United Nations (1977–1982).

=== 9 ===
- Hans Abramson, 82, Swedish film director.
- Audrey Arno, 70, German pop singer, Alzheimer's disease.
- Roy Ayres, 82, American guitar player.
- Rachel Browne, 77, Canadian dancer and choreographer.
- Régis Clère, 55, French Olympic (1980) road bicycle racer, complications during surgery.
- Burwyn Davidson, 68, Australian politician.
- Don Durbridge, 73, British broadcaster.
- George Ede, 72, Canadian biathlete.
- Masahisa Fukase, 78, Japanese photographer, cerebral hemorrhage.
- Paul Jenkins, 88, American abstract expressionist painter.
- Thomas Kalman, 94, American politician.
- John Maples, 69, British politician and life peer, MP for Lewisham West (1983–1992) and Stratford-on-Avon (1997–2010), cancer.
- Ivan Minatti, 88, Slovenian poet and translator.
- Georges Sari, 87, Greek author and actress.
- Hawk Taylor, 73, American baseball player (Milwaukee Braves, New York Mets, Kansas City Royals).
- Abram Wilson, 38, American jazz trumpeter, cancer.

=== 10 ===
- Piero Bellugi, 87, Italian conductor.
- Eivind Bolle, 88, Norwegian politician.
- Kenneth Clark, 89, New Zealand-born British ceramicist.
- Nikita Dolgushin, 73, Russian Soviet ballet dancer and choreographer.
- Jimmy Elledge, 69, American singer, complications following a stroke.
- Judy Freudberg, 62, American television (Sesame Street) and film (The Land Before Time, An American Tail) writer, brain tumor.
- Warner Fusselle, 68, American sportscaster (Brooklyn Cyclones, This Week in Baseball), heart attack.
- Will Hoebee, 64, Dutch music producer, cancer.
- Richard L. Hoffman, 84, American zoologist.
- Sixten Isberg, 90, Swedish alpine skier.
- Maria Keil, 97, Portuguese artist.
- Georges Mathieu, 91, French artist.
- Dante Micheli, 73, Italian football player.
- Ruby Monaghan, 96, Australian cricketer.
- Joshua Orwa Ojode, 53, Kenyan politician, MP for Ndhiwa (since 1994), Assistant Minister for Internal Security, helicopter crash.
- Elvis Perrodin, 55, American jockey, cancer.
- George Saitoti, 66, Kenyan politician, MP for Kajiado North (since 1988), Vice-President (1989–1997, 1999–2002), helicopter crash.
- Sudono Salim, 95, Indonesian businessman.
- Eugene Selznick, 82, American Hall of Fame volleyball player and Olympic (1964, 1996, 2000) coach, pneumonia.
- Gérard Théodore, 91, French Compagnon de la Libération.
- Hugo Thiemann, 95, Swiss businessman, co-founded Club of Rome.
- Daya-Nand Verma, 78, Indian mathematician (Verma modules).
- Gordon West, 69, English football player (Everton), cancer.

=== 11 ===
- Lee Allen, 77, American Olympic wrestler (1956, 1960) and coach (1980), heart failure.
- Kinsey Anderson, 85, American professor of physics (University of California at Berkeley).
- Hector Bianciotti, 82, Argentine-born French writer, member of the Académie française.
- Dave Boswell, 67, American baseball player (Minnesota Twins), heart attack.
- Samanunu Cakobau-Talakuli, 72, Fijian chief and politician.
- Patricia Donahue, 87, American actress.
- Raymond Eid, 81, Syrian Maronite Catholic hierarch, Metropolitan of Damascus (1999–2005).
- Michael Fellman, 68–69, Canadian professor.
- Anthony Hancock, 65, British publisher, stroke.
- Masazumi Harada, 77, Japanese doctor, researcher of Minamata disease, acute myeloid leukemia.
- Norman F. Lent, 81, American politician, U.S. Representative from New York (1971–1993), cancer.
- A.M. Parkin, 68, English artist.
- Reggie Pearman, 89, American middle-distance runner.
- Ann Rutherford, 94, Canadian-born American actress (Gone with the Wind, The Secret Life of Walter Mitty), heart disease.
- Stay High 149, 61, American graffiti artist, complications from liver disease.
- Teófilo Stevenson, 60, Cuban Olympic gold medal-winning (1972, 1976, 1980) boxer, heart attack.
- Berthold Wulf, 85, German priest, poet and philosopher.

=== 12 ===
- Marwan Arafat, 67, Syrian footballer and referee, assassinated.
- Philip H. Corboy, 87, American lawyer.
- Darara, 29, Irish-bred French-trained Thoroughbred racehorse, winner of the 1986 Prix de Psyché and Prix Vermeille.
- Juan José Díaz Infante Núñez, 75, Mexican architect and industrial designer.
- Henry Hill, 69, American mobster, inspiration for the movie Goodfellas, heart disease.
- Sheikh Mukhtar Mohamed Hussein, 100, Somali politician, Interim president (1969).
- Annie B. Martin, 91, American civil rights activist.
- Margarete Mitscherlich-Nielsen, 94, Danish-born German psychoanalyst and feminist.
- Elinor Ostrom, 78, American economist and Nobel laureate (Economics, 2009), pancreatic cancer.
- Mercedes Otero, 74, Puerto Rican politician, member of Senate (1993 to 2001), swollen appendix.
- Pahiño, 89, Spanish footballer.
- Aldo Ronconi, 93, Italian racing cyclist.
- Frank Walker, 69, Australian politician, MP for Robertson (1990–1996), and judge, cancer.
- Don Woods, 84, American meteorologist and cartoonist, cancer.

=== 13 ===
- Chris Andrews, 55, American entrepreneur.
- James Ashworth, 23, English soldier, awarded Victoria Cross, shot.
- Sam Beddingfield, 78, American aerospace engineer, lung cancer.
- Graeme Bell, 97, Australian jazz musician and composer, stroke.
- Chiara Corbella Petrillo, 28, Italian anti-abortion activist, carcinoma.
- Monte Crockett, 73, American football player.
- Roger Garaudy, 98, French philosopher, author, and Holocaust denier.
- Luiz Gonzaga Bergonzini, 76, Brazilian Roman Catholic prelate, Bishop of Guarulhos (1991–2011).
- Mehdi Hassan, 84, Pakistani ghazal singer, chest infection.
- Jože Humer, 76, Slovenian composer, cancer.
- Johnny Kemper, 67, American actor and bodybuilder.
- Erica Kennedy, 42, American author and columnist.
- William Standish Knowles, 95, American chemist and Nobel laureate (Chemistry, 2001), complications from amyotrophic lateral sclerosis.
- Dawid Kruiper, 71, South African tribal leader, tuberculosis.
- Hannu Posti, 86, Finnish long-distance runner and biathlete.
- Giacinto Santambrogio, 67, Italian professional bicycle racer.
- Michael Sokolski, 85, Polish-born American design engineer, founder of Scantron, heart failure.
- Gladys Widdiss, 97, American tribal historian and potter, President of the Aquinnah Wampanoag of Gay Head (1978–1987).

=== 14 ===
- Dick Acres, 78, American basketball coach.
- Edward Andersson, 78, Finnish legal scholar.
- Peter Archer, Baron Archer of Sandwell, 85, British politician, MP for Rowley Regis and Tipton (1966–1974) and Warley West (1974–1992).
- Víctor Manuel Báez, Mexican crime journalist, murdered.
- Bill Barlee, 79, Canadian politician.
- Rosalie Bertell, 83, American scientist, author, environmental activist, epidemiologist, and nun, cancer.
- Al Brancato, 93, American baseball player (Philadelphia Athletics).
- Bob Chappuis, 89, American AAFC football player (Brooklyn Dodgers, Chicago Hornets), complications of a fall.
- Anadi Sankar Gupta, 79, Indian mathematician.
- Bob Hank, 88, Australian SANFL footballer (West Torrens), ruptured abdominal aortic aneurysm.
- Margie Hyams, 91, American jazz musician, renal failure.
- Karl-Heinz Kämmerling, 82, German classical pianist and teacher.
- Hassan Kassai, 83, Iranian musician.
- Adrien Poliquin, 83, Canadian Olympic wrestler.
- Jesse Powell, 65, American football player (Miami Dolphins).
- Kaka Radhakrishnan, 86, Indian actor, respiratory failure.
- Carlos Reichenbach, 67, Brazilian filmmaker, cardiac arrest.
- Erik Rhodes, 30, American pornographic actor, heart attack.
- Jean Robieux, 86, French physicist.
- Jaroslav Šabata, 84, Czech politologist and dissident.
- Gitta Sereny, 91, Austrian-born British author.
- Juha Sihvola, 54, Finnish historian and philosopher.
- Mundia Sikatana, 74, Zambian politician and diplomat.
- Mako Tabuni, Indonesian separatist leader, deputy chairman of the National Committee for West Papua, shooting.
- Jerry Tubbs, 77, American football player (Dallas Cowboys, Chicago Cardinals, San Francisco 49ers).
- Yvette Wilson, 48, American comedian and actress (Moesha, The Parkers), cervical cancer.

=== 15 ===
- Anouar Abdel-Malek, 88, Egyptian-born French political scientist.
- Araafa, 9, Irish-bred, British-trained Thoroughbred racehorse and sire, ruptured blood vessel.
- Robin Benson, 83, Irish sailor.
- Francis Bonaert, 97, Belgian architect.
- Don Cacas, 80, Australian Olympic wrestler.
- Phillip D. Cagan, 85, American economist.
- Günther Domenig, 77, Austrian architect.
- Rune Gustafsson, 78, Swedish jazz guitarist and composer.
- George Kerr, 74, Jamaican athlete, heart attack.
- Barry MacKay, 76, American tennis player and commentator.
- Albino Mamede Cleto, 77, Portuguese Roman Catholic prelate, Bishop of Coimbra (2001–2011).
- Israel Nogueda Otero, 77, Mexican politician and economist, Governor of Guerrero (1971–1975), heart attack.
- Carl Julius Norstrøm, 76, Norwegian economist.
- Alan Saunders, 58, English-born Australian broadcaster and philosopher, pneumonia.
- Simon Tortell, 52, Maltese football player.
- Pasa Tosusu, 54, Vanuatuan civil servant.
- Albert Joseph Tsiahoana, 84, Malagasy Roman Catholic prelate, Archbishop of Antsiranana (1967–1998).
- Arthur Henry Winnington Williams, 99, Jamaican parliamentarian.
- Angus Wright, 78, British television producer.

=== 16 ===
- Nayef bin Abdulaziz, 78, Saudi royal, Governor of Riyadh (1953–1955), Minister of Interior (since 1975), and Crown Prince (since 2011).
- Jaroslava Adamová, 87, Czech actress.
- Giuseppe Bertolucci, 65, Italian film director.
- Kamala Bose, 64, Indian classical vocalist.
- Howie Chizek, 65, American public address announcer (Cleveland Cavaliers, Cleveland Force) and talk radio host (WNIR), heart attack.
- June Curry, 91, American housewife.
- Dan Dorfman, 80, American financial journalist (CNN, CNBC), cardiogenic shock.
- John Faiman, 70, American football player, brain aneurysm.
- Sir Alasdair Fraser, 65, Northern Irish lawyer, Director of Public Prosecutions for Northern Ireland (1989–2010), cancer.
- Nils Karlsson, 94, Swedish Olympic gold medal-winning (1948) cross-country skier.
- Jorge Lankenau, 68, Mexican banker.
- Sławomir Petelicki, 65, Polish army officer (JW GROM), suspected suicide by gunshot.
- Stanley Pinker, 87, South African painter and printmaker.
- Thierry Roland, 74, French sports journalist, stroke.
- Jiří Siegel, 85, Czech Olympic basketball player.
- Susan Tyrrell, 67, American actress (Cry-Baby, Fat City, The Chipmunk Adventure), essential thrombocytosis.

=== 17 ===
- Stéphane Brosse, 40, French ski mountaineer, climbing accident.
- Patricia Brown, 81, American baseball player (All-American Girls Professional Baseball League) and professor (Suffolk University).
- George Casella, 61, American statistician, multiple myeloma.
- Jack Caulfield, 83, American security operative and law enforcement officer.
- Chen Din Hwa, 89, Chinese industrialist, prostate cancer.
- Nathan Divinsky, 87, Canadian mathematician, author, and chess master.
- Kevin Easton, 79, Australian footballer.
- Brian Hibbard, 65, Welsh actor and singer (The Flying Pickets), prostate cancer.
- Anthony Ekezia Ilonu, 74, Nigerian Roman Catholic prelate, Bishop of Okigwe (1981–2006).
- Raivo Järvi, 57, Estonian artist, radio personality, and politician, member of the Riigikogu (since 2003).
- Rodney King, 47, American victim of videotaped police beating that sparked the 1992 Los Angeles riots, accidental drowning.
- Walo Lüönd, 85, Swiss actor, pneumonia.
- John McEldowney, 64, New Zealand international rugby union player.
- R. C. Owens, 77, American football player (San Francisco 49ers, Baltimore Colts, New York Giants) and executive (San Francisco 49ers).
- Bernard Prior, 78, English rugby league player.
- Fauzia Wahab, 56, Pakistani politician, complications of gall bladder surgery.

=== 18 ===
- Nicky Barnes, 78, American crime boss, cancer.
- Doug Brown, 88, Australian footballer.
- Buangi Sailo, 82, Indian writer.
- Don Charlwood, 96, Australian author.
- Kay Christopher, 86, American actress and model, diabetes.
- Horacio Coppola, 105, Argentine photographer and filmmaker.
- Lina Haag, 105, German anti-fascist activist.
- Dennis Hamilton, 68, American basketball player (Los Angeles Lakers), cancer.
- Ghazala Javed, 24, Pakistani singer, shooting.
- Eva Klepáčová, 79, Czech actress.
- Tom Maynard, 23, Welsh cricketer, electrocution.
- Luis Edgardo Mercado Jarrín, 92, Peruvian politician, Prime Minister (1973–1975).
- Jim Packard, 70, American public radio announcer (Whad'Ya Know?), cardiopulmonary disease.
- Alketas Panagoulias, 78, Greek football player and manager.
- Salem Ali Qatan, Yemeni general, explosion.
- Alexander Robinson, 87, Australian cricketer.
- Victor Spinetti, 82, Welsh comic actor (A Hard Day's Night, Help!, Magical Mystery Tour), prostate cancer.
- William Van Regenmorter, 73, American politician, Michigan State Senator (1991–2003) and State Representative (1983–1991, 2003–2007), Parkinson's disease.
- Bernard Vifian, 67, Swiss cyclist.
- Judith Wallerstein, 90, American psychologist and anti-divorce activist.
- Ralph Wenzel, 69, American football player (Pittsburgh Steelers, San Diego Chargers), complications from dementia.

=== 19 ===
- Guma Aguiar, 35, Brazilian-born American energy industrialist and businessman, drawn (disappeared on that day).
- Anthony Bate, 84, British actor (Tinker Tailor Soldier Spy).
- Bryan Bayley, 79, New Zealand cricketer.
- Yves Boël, 84, Belgian businessman.
- Gerry Bron, 79, British record producer and manager (Uriah Heep, Motörhead).
- Jim Drake, 83, American aeronautical engineer, inventor of the windsurfer, complications from lung disease.
- Romuald Drobaczyński, 81, Polish film director.
- K. R. Gangadharan, 76, Indian film producer.
- Walter Haefner, 101, Irish businessman and Thoroughbred owner.
- Gerhard Kallmann, 97, German-born American architect (Boston City Hall), co-founder of Kallmann McKinnell & Wood.
- Luuk Kroon, 69, Dutch naval officer, Commander of the Royal Netherlands Navy (1995–1998), Chief of the Netherlands Defence Staff (1998–2004).
- Aloysio José Leal Penna, 79, Brazilian Roman Catholic prelate, Archbishop of Botucatu (2000–2008).
- Richard Lynch, 72, American actor (Battlestar Galactica, Star Trek: The Next Generation), heart attack.
- Sir Michael Palliser, 90, British diplomat, Head of the Diplomatic Service (1975–1982).
- Ronald Roberts, 89, British Olympic swimmer.
- Harold H. Seward, 81, American computer scientist.
- Joan LaCour Scott, 91, American screenwriter (The Waltons, Lassie).
- Emili Teixidor, 78, Spanish writer and journalist, cancer.
- Norbert Tiemann, 87, American politician, Governor of Nebraska (1967–1971).
- Kevin M. Tucker, 71, American police commissioner of the Philadelphia Police Department (1986–1988), brain tumor.

=== 20 ===
- Judy Agnew, 91, American Second Lady (1969–1973), widow of former Vice President Spiro Agnew.
- Roman Bazan, 73, Polish footballer.
- Frieda Berryhill, 90, American anti–nuclear power activist.
- William W. Cooper, 97, American management scientist.
- Robert J. Kelleher, 99, American tennis player, official (International Tennis Hall Of Fame inductee) and senior judge of the District Court for the Central District of California.
- Tracy Lemon, 42, New Zealand rugby union player (national team).
- Alistair Vane-Tempest-Stewart, 9th Marquess of Londonderry, 74, British nobleman.
- Alcides Mendoza Castro, 84, Peruvian Roman Catholic prelate, Archbishop of Cuzco (1983–2003).
- LeRoy Neiman, 91, American artist.
- Heinrich IV, Prince Reuss of Köstritz, 92, German noble.
- Andrew Sarris, 83, American film critic, complications from a fall.
- Mike Westmacott, 87, British mountaineer, member of 1953 British Mount Everest Expedition.
- Robert Zimmermann, 77, Swiss Olympic bobsledder.

=== 21 ===
- J. Michael Adams, 64, American professor, President of Fairleigh Dickinson University (since 1999), acute myeloid leukemia.
- Richard Adler, 90, American Tony Award-winning producer and composer (Damn Yankees, The Pajama Game).
- William Stewart, Lord Allanbridge, 86, Scottish judge and politician.
- Tejparkash Singh Brar, 74, Kenyan Olympic hockey player.
- Dennis H. Carter, 91, Canadian architect and amateur filmmaker.
- Ziad Durrani, 30, Pakistani politician, cardiac arrest.
- Sylvia Ettenberg, 94, Jewish educator.
- Abid Hussain, 85, Indian civil servant and diplomat, heart attack.
- Sunil Janah, 94, Indian photographer.
- Viggo Johannessen, 76, Norwegian civil servant.
- Joviano de Lima Júnior, 70, Brazilian Roman Catholic prelate, Archbishop of Ribeirão Preto (since 2006).
- Sir Alexander MacAra, 80, British doctor and medical administrator.
- Shōgyo Ōba, 96, Japanese lacquer artist (Maki-e), Living National Treasure.
- Radha Vinod Raju, 62, Indian police chief, lung infection and multiple organ failure.
- Gilbert Blaize Rego, 90, Indian Roman Catholic prelate, Bishop of Simla and Chandigarh (1971–1999).
- Anna Schwartz, 96, American economist and author (A Monetary History of the United States).
- Teddy Scott, 83, Scottish footballer (Aberdeen).
- Ramaz Shengelia, 55, Georgian football player, heart attack.
- Drew Turnbull, 82, British rugby player, complications of Alzheimer's disease.

=== 22 ===
- Obaidullah Baig, 76, Pakistani writer and television personality, cancer.
- María Teresa Castillo, 103, Venezuelan journalist and activist, founder of the Caracas Athenaeum.
- Edward N. Costikyan, 87, American politician and author.
- D. S. Ravindra Doss, 67, Indian journalist and union leader.
- John Fabien, Dominican politician.
- Mary Fedden, 96, British painter.
- Fernie Flaman, 85, Canadian ice hockey player (Boston Bruins, Toronto Maple Leafs) and Hall of Fame member.
- Juan Luis Galiardo, 72, Spanish actor (Antony and Cleopatra, Tango), lung cancer.
- Sergio Goretti, 83, Italian Roman Catholic prelate, Bishop of Assisi-Nocera Umbra-Gualdo Tadino (1980–2005).
- Edmund Kornfeld, 93, American organic chemist.
- Jackie Neilson, 83, Scottish footballer (St Mirren).
- Mirjam Polkunen, 86, Finnish writer.
- Rolly Tasker, 86, Australian Olympic silver medal-winning (1956) sailor, cancer.
- Hans Villius, 88, Swedish historian, television and radio personality, complications of diabetes.
- Margaret Wright, 72, British politician, Principal Speaker of the Green Party (1999–2003), cancer.

=== 23 ===
- Adorable Rubí, 68, Mexican wrestler, kidney infection.
- Hamza Bounab, 28, Algerian football player, heart attack.
- Marjorie Chibnall, 96, British medievalist.
- Franz Crass, 84, German singer.
- Count Robin de La Lanne-Mirrlees, 87, British author, soldier, and officer of arms.
- James Durbin, 88, British statistician and econometrician.
- Brigitte Engerer, 59, French pianist, cancer.
- Arne Wegner Haaland, 88, Norwegian engineer.
- Ken Hargreaves, 73, British politician, MP for Hyndburn (1983–1992), cancer.
- Hollywood Wildcat, 22, American Thoroughbred racehorse, winner of the Breeders' Cup Distaff (1993) and Gamely Stakes (1994), cancer.
- Robert G. Marotz, 90, American politician, Wisconsin State Assemblyman (1949–1959) and Speaker (1957–1959).
- Alan McDonald, 48, Northern Irish football player and manager, apparent heart attack.
- Frank Chee Willeto, 87, American Navajo code talker in World War II, Congressional Silver Medal recipient, Vice President of the Navajo Nation (1998–1999).
- Walter J. Zable, 97, American founder and CEO of Cubic Corporation.

=== 24 ===
- Chris Adams, 84, English footballer.
- Darrel Akerfelds, 50, American baseball player (Philadelphia Phillies) and coach (San Diego Padres), pancreatic cancer.
- Gad Beck, 88, German educator, author, and gay Holocaust survivor.
- Choi Chung-sik, 80, South Korean athlete.
- Jean Cox, 90, American opera singer.
- Youssef Dawoud, 74, Egyptian actor.
- Ralph Elliott, 90, German-born Australian professor of English and runologist.
- Elwi Gazi, 83, Egyptian Olympic equestrian.
- Karnail Gill, 70, Indian folk singer, cancer.
- James Grout, 84, English actor (Inspector Morse).
- Ruth Grulkowski, 81, American Olympic gymnast.
- Gu Chaohao, 86, Chinese mathematician.
- Karl Guðmundsson, 88, Icelandic football player and manager.
- Birger Karlsson, 85, Finnish Olympic rower.
- Heino Kruus, 85, Estonian Olympic silver medal-winning (1952) basketball player.
- Lonesome George, app. 102, Ecuadorian Pinta Island tortoise endling, apparent heart failure.
- Ted Luckenbill, 72, American basketball player (Philadelphia Warriors), cancer.
- Miki Roqué, 23, Spanish footballer, cancer.
- Ann C. Scales, 60, American lawyer and law professor, complications of a fall.
- Rudolf Schmid, 97, Swiss-born German Roman Catholic prelate, Auxiliary Bishop of Augsburg (1972–1990).
- Claude Sumner, 92, Canadian philosopher.

=== 25 ===
- Robert F. Berkhofer, 80, American historian.
- Krishna Bhusan Bal, 64, Nepalese poet, intracerebral hemorrhage.
- Richard E. Butler, 86, Australian public servant."
- Shigemitsu Dandō, 98, Japanese jurist and Supreme Court judge.
- Erhard Domay, 72, German theologian.
- Norman Felton, 99, British-born American television producer (The Man from U.N.C.L.E.).
- Yitzhak Galanti, 75, Israeli politician.
- Campbell Gillies, 21, Scottish jockey, swimming pool accident.
- George Randolph Hearst Jr., 84, American businessman (Hearst Corporation), complications from a stroke.
- Vyacheslav Ionov, 71, Russian Olympic gold medal-winning (1964) sprint canoer.
- Lucella MacLean, 91, Canadian baseball player (All-American Girls Professional Baseball League).
- Sir David Money-Coutts, 80, British banker.
- Edgar Ross, 62, American boxer.
- Doris Schade, 88, German television actress.
- Kjell Sørensen, 81, Norwegian Olympics sports shooter.

=== 26 ===
- Sverker Åström, 96, Swedish diplomat.
- Daniel Batman, 31, Australian Olympic (2000) sprinter, traffic collision.
- Miloš Blagojević, 81, Serbian historian.
- Dan Carr, 60, American poet, cancer.
- Jean Chapman, 86, Australian writer, stroke.
- Chen Qiang, 94, Chinese actor.
- Pat Cummings, 55, American basketball player (New York Knicks, Miami Heat).
- Angelo Cuniberti, 91, Italian-born Colombian Roman Catholic prelate, Vicar Apostolic of Florencia (1961–1978).
- Ann Curtis, 86, American Olympic gold and silver medal-winning (1948) swimmer.
- Juan Carlos Dyrzka, 71, Argentine Olympic (1964, 1968) hurdler, heart failure.
- Harry Edwards, 85, Australian politician, member of the Australian House of Representatives for Berowra (1972–1993).
- Nora Ephron, 71, American film director (Sleepless in Seattle, You've Got Mail) and screenwriter (When Harry Met Sally...), BAFTA winner (1990), pneumonia.
- José García Ortiz, 63, Mexican politician, MP (2003–2006).
- Malcolm Glazzard, 80, English footballer.
- Amar Goswami, 66, Indian writer and journalist.
- Harry W. Kvebæk, 87, Norwegian musician.
- Harry Levinson, 90, American psychologist.
- Howard Michell, 98, Australian businessman and philanthropist.
- Mario O'Hara, 68, Filipino film director, leukemia.
- Doris Singleton, 92, American actress (I Love Lucy, My Three Sons, Affair in Reno).

=== 27 ===
- Jerónimo Tomás Abreu Herrera, 81, Dominican Roman Catholic prelate, Bishop of Mao-Monte Cristi (1978–2006).
- Dénes Berényi, 83, Hungarian physicist.
- Filemón Camacho, 85, Venezuelan Olympic athlete.
- Susanna Clark, 73, American artist and songwriter, cancer.
- Stan Cox, 93, British Olympic athlete (1948, 1952).
- Renate Damm, 65, German road bicycle racer.
- Rosemary Dobson, 92, Australian poet.
- Bobby Jack Floyd, 82, American football player.
- Jesse Glover, 77, American martial arts instructor, cancer.
- Don Grady, 68, American actor (My Three Sons, The Mickey Mouse Club), cancer.
- Eddie Jones, 74, American football executive (Miami Dolphins).
- Iurie Miterev, 37, Moldovan international footballer, leukemia.
- Konstantinos Triaridis, 74, Greek politician, Minister for Macedonia-Thrace (1993–1996), cancer.
- Algimantas Vincas Ulba, 73, Lithuanian politician.

=== 28 ===
- Vicente Bobadilla, 74, Paraguayan footballer.
- Stephen Dwoskin, 73, American experimental filmmaker.
- Fred Dyke, 89, Canadian curler.
- Éric Gaudibert, 75, Swiss composer.
- Kamal Ghanaja, Jordanian Hamas member, shot.
- Richard Isay, 77, American psychiatrist, cancer.
- Ivan Karp, 86, American art dealer, natural causes.
- Leontine T. Kelly, 92, American Methodist bishop.
- Ron Lynch, 89, English cricketer, long illness.
- Gabriel G. Nahas, 92, American physician.
- Robert Sabatier, 88, French writer.
- Chris Sanderson, 38, Canadian lacrosse player and coach, cancer.
- Doris Sams, 85, American baseball player (All-American Girls Professional Baseball League).
- Norman Sas, 87, American entrepreneur, inventor of Electric football, stroke.
- Herb Scherer, 83, American basketball player (Tri-Cities Blackhawks, New York Knicks).
- Paul Stassino, 82, Greek-Cypriot actor (Thunderball).
- Zhang Ruifang, 94, Chinese film actress.

=== 29 ===
- Carlos Alberto, 80, Brazilian Olympic footballer.
- Vahe Avetyan, 32, Armenian doctor, brain injury.
- Takeo Chii, 70, Japanese actor, heart failure.
- Joan Dunlop, 78, British health advocate and activist, cancer.
- Antonio Floirendo Sr., 96, Filipino entrepreneur and landowner, kidney failure.
- Verna Harrah, 67, American film producer (Anaconda).
- Graham Horn, 57, English footballer (Luton Town).
- Mogale Paul Nkhumishe, 74, South African Roman Catholic prelate, Bishop of Witbank (1984–2000) and Polokwane (2000–2011).
- Vincent Ostrom, 92, American political scientist.
- Juan Reccius, 101, Chilean Olympic athlete (1936), South American champion (1935).
- Włodzimierz Sokołowski, 71, Polish Olympic athlete.
- Floyd Temple, 86, American baseball coach (University of Kansas).
- José Sótero Valero Ruz, 76, Venezuelan Roman Catholic prelate, Bishop of Guanare (2001–2011).
- Yong Nyuk Lin, 94, Singaporean politician.

=== 30 ===
- Michael Abney-Hastings, 14th Earl of Loudoun, 69, British Australian peer.
- Luís Caldas, 85, Portuguese Olympic wrestler.
- Vladlen Davydov, 88, Soviet and Russian theater and film actor.
- Miguel S. Demapan, 59, American jurist, Chief Justice of the Northern Mariana Islands Supreme Court (1999–2011).
- Richard Eardley, 83, American politician, Mayor of Boise, Idaho (1974–1986), heart attack.
- Olivier Ferrand, 42, French civil servant and public intellectual.
- Marilyn Houlberg, 72, American anthropologist.
- Thymios Karakatsanis, 71, Greek actor.
- Jacqueline Law, 45, Hong Kong actress, pancreatic cancer.
- Joyce D. Miller, 84, American union activist.
- Armando Montaño, 22, American student and journalist, suffocation.
- Ivan Sekyra, 59, Czech guitarist (Abraxas).
- Yitzhak Shamir, 96, Israeli politician, Prime Minister (1983–1984, 1986–1992), Alzheimer's disease.
- Yomo Toro, 78, Puerto Rican cuatro player, kidney failure.
- Michael J. Ybarra, 45, American journalist and author, climbing accident.
