= Institute for the Study and Elimination of Jewish Influence on German Church Life =

Former organization in Eisenach, Nazi Germany

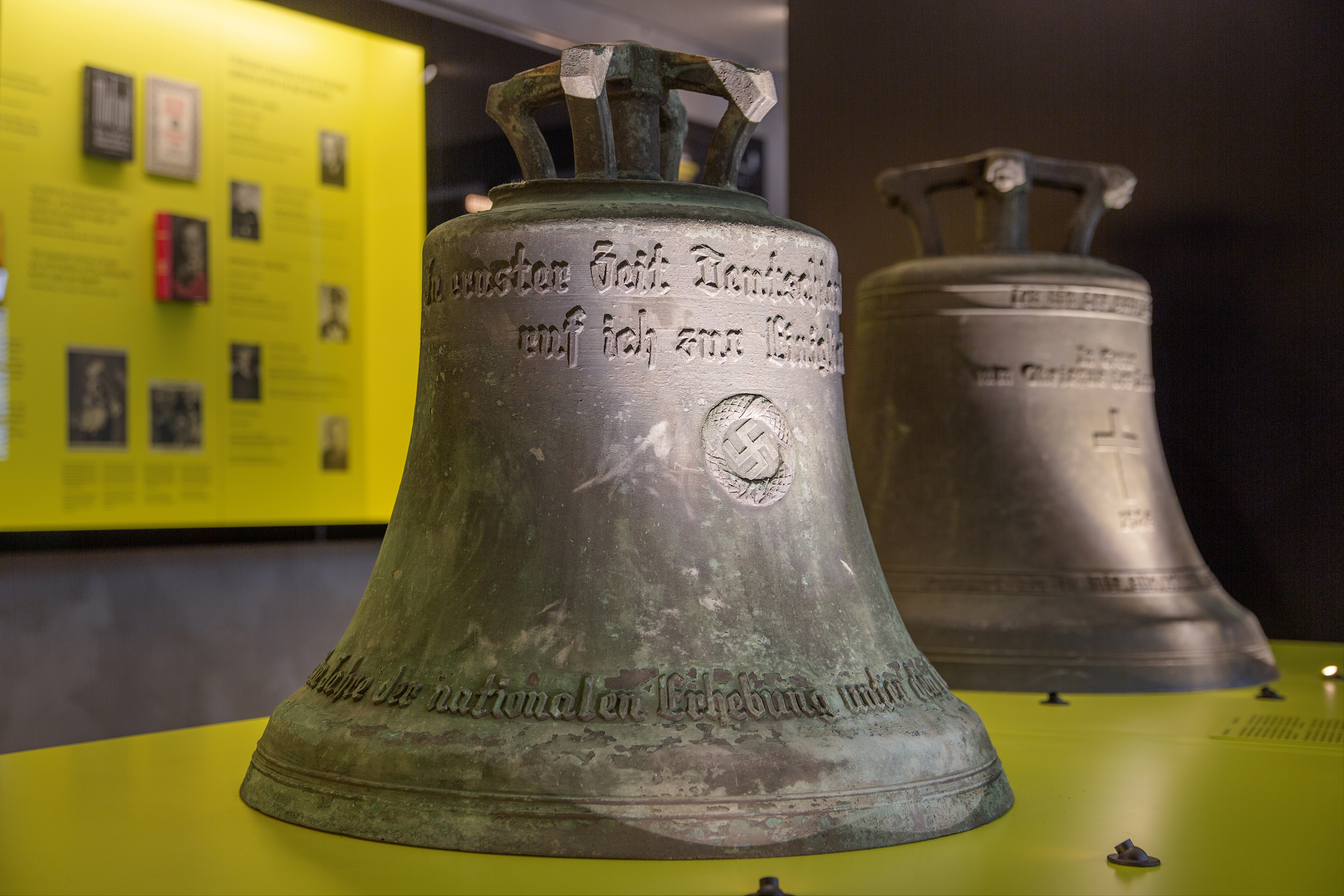
Two “Nazi bells” from Thuringian churches are on display in the special exhibition “Study and Eradication. The Church’s “Dejudaization Institute”, 1939–1945”.

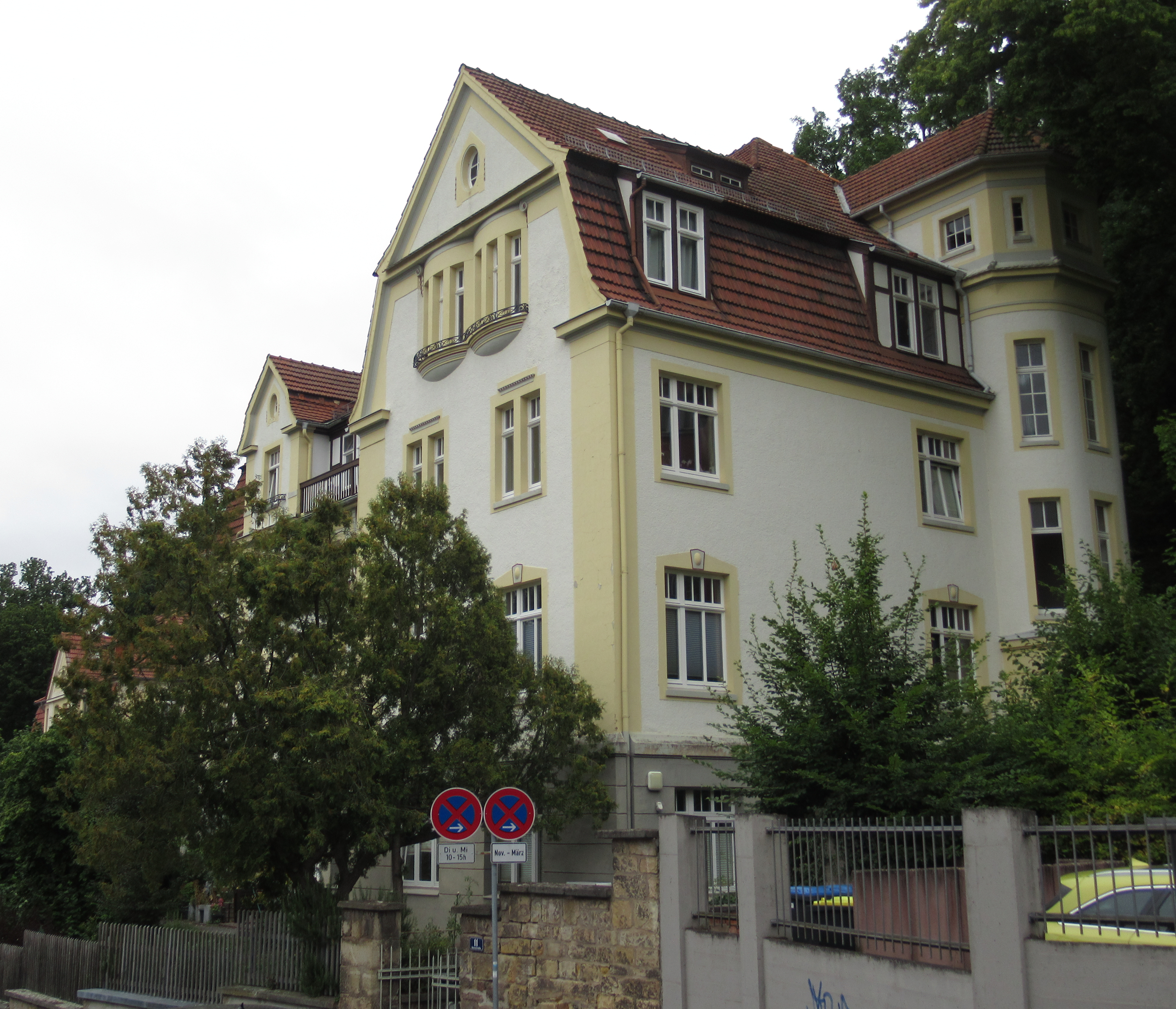
The institute's first headquarters were located in this building (Bornstraße 11, Eisenach)

The Institute for the Study and Elimination of Jewish Influence on German Church Life (German: Institut zur Erforschung und Beseitigung des jüdischen Einflusses auf das deutsche kirchliche Leben) was a cross-church establishment by eleven German Protestant churches in Nazi Germany, founded at the instigation of the German Christian movement. It was set up in Eisenach under Siegfried Leffler and Walter Grundmann. Georg Bertram, professor of New Testament at the University of Giessen, who led the Institute from 1943 until the Institute's dissolution in May 1945, wrote about its goals in March 1944:

"This war is Jewry's war against Europe." This sentence contains a truth which is again and again confirmed by the research of the Institute. This research work is not only adjusted to the frontal attack, but also to the strengthening of the inner front for attack and defence against all the covert Jewry and Jewish being, which has oozed into the Occidental Culture in the course of centuries, ... thus the Institute, in addition to the study and elimination of the Jewish influence, also has the positive task of understanding the own Christian German being and the organisation of a pious German life based on this knowledge.

The Institute produced a Bible without the Old Testament and remade the New Testament, removing the genealogies of Jesus that showed his Davidic descent. It removed Jewish names and places, quotations from the Old Testament (unless they showed Jews in a bad light), and any mentions of fulfilled Old Testament prophecies. It remade Jesus into a militaristic, heroic figure fighting the Jews using Nazified language.

In 1942, the Institute produced a hymn book, Grosser Gott wir loben Dich, which likewise removed any references to Zion, Jehovah, Jerusalem, Temple and Psalm. Words were substantially rewritten and many 19th- and 20th-century authors were represented who were previously not. It was about half the size of previous hymn books.

The Lutherhaus Eisenach displayed the exhibition Study and Eradication. The Church’s ‘Dejudaization Institute’, 1939–1945, which examines the institute’s historical background, origins, work and impact, from 2019 to 2022.

== Founding churches ==
The Evangelical Church in Central Germany, Evangelical Lutheran Church in Northern Germany, Evangelical Lutheran Regional Church of Saxony, Evangelical Regional Church of Anhalt, Evangelical Church in Hesse and Nassau, Evangelical Lutheran Church in Oldenburg, Evangelical Church of the Palatinate (Protestant Regional Church) and Evangelical Church of the Augsburg Confession in Austria and Helvetic Confessions in Austria. The Union of Evangelical Churches was composed of individual member churches.

== See also ==
- Orientalism

== Bibliography ==
- Jochen Birkenmeier, Michael Weise: Study and Eradication. The Church’s „Dejudaization Institute“, 1939–1945. Companion Volume to the Exhibition, Eisenach: Stiftung Lutherhaus Eisenach 2020; ISBN 978-3-9818078-5-1
- Heschel, Susannah (2008). The Aryan Jesus : Christian theologians and the Bible in Nazi Germany. Princeton: Princeton University Press. ISBN 978-0-691-12531-2.
- Heschel, Susannah: The theological Faculty at the university of Jena as a Stronghold of national Socialism; in: Mordechai Feingold: History of Universities; Oxford 2003; S. 143–169; ISBN 1-4020-3974-3
- (in German) Susannah Heschel: Theologen für Hitler. Walter Grundmann und das „Institut zur Erforschung und Beseitigung des jüdischen Einflusses auf das deutsche kirchliche Leben“; S. 125–170
- (in German) Fritz-Bauer-Institut (Hrsg.): „Beseitigung des jüdischen Einflusses …“ Antisemitische Forschung, Eliten und Karrieren im Nationalsozialismus; Jahrbuch 1998/99 zur Geschichte und Wirkung des Holocaust; Darmstadt 1999
- (in German) Hans Prolingheuer: Wir sind in die Irre gegangen. Die Schuld der Kirche unterm Hakenkreuz, nach dem Bekenntnis des "Darmstädter Wortes" von 1947, Köln: Pahl-Rugenstein 1987; ISBN 3-7609-1144-7.
- (in German) Eberhard Röhm, Jörg Thierfelder: Juden-Christen-Deutsche, Vol 3/II: 1938-1941; Calwer Taschenbibliothek 51; Stuttgart: Calwer Verlag 1995; ISBN 3-7668-3398-7; S. 43–54
- (in German) Thomas A. Seidel (Hrsg.): Thüringer Gratwanderungen. Beiträge zur 75jährigen Geschichte der evangelischen Landeskirche Thüringens; Reihe: Herbergen der Christenheit. Jahrbuch für deutsche Kirchengeschichte, Sonderband 3; Leipzig: Evangelische Verlagsanstalt, 1998; ISBN 3-374-01699-5
- (in German) Erich Stegmann: Der Kirchenkampf in der Thüringer Evangelischen Kirche 1933-1945; Berlin: Evangelische Verlagsanstalt; Jena: Wartburg-Verlag Kessler, 1984;
- (in German) Leonore Siegele-Wenschkewitz (ed.): Christlicher Antijudaismus und Antisemitismus. Theologische und kirchliche Programme Deutscher Christen; Arnoldshainer Texte 85; Frankfurt am Main: Haag und Herchen, 1994; ISBN 3-86137-187-1;
  darin:
- (in German) Birgit Jerke: Wie wurde das Neue Testament zu einem sogenannten Volkstestament „entjudet“? Aus der Arbeit des Eisenacher „Instituts zur Erforschung und Beseitigung des jüdischen Einflusses auf das deutsche kirchliche Leben“; pp. 201–234
- (in German) Birgit Gregor (=Jerke): Zum protestantischen Antisemitismus. Evangelische Kirchen und Theologen in der Zeit des Nationalsozialismus; in: Jahrbuch 1998/99 zur Geschichte und Wirkung des Holocaust; Darmstadt 1999; S. 171–200
- (in German) Matthias Wolfes: Protestantische Theologie und moderne Welt – Studien zur Geschichte der liberalen Theologie nach 1918; Theologische Bibliothek Töpelmann 102; Berlin/New York 1999; S. 366–380; ISBN 3-11-016639-9
- (in German) Peter von der Osten-Sacken (Hg.): Das mißbrauchte Evangelium. Studien zu Theologie und Praxis der Thüringer Deutschen Christen; Berlin: Institut Kirche und Judentum, 2002; ISBN 3-923095-74-0
- (in German) Jan Björn Potthast: Das jüdische Zentralmuseum der SS in Prag. Gegnerforschung und Völkermord im Nationalsozialismus Frankfurt/Main, New York: 2002; S. 32f.
