= Walter Grundmann =

German theologian (1906–1976)

Walter Grundmann (21 October 1906, in Chemnitz – 30 August 1976, in Eisenach) was a German Protestant theologian. During the Nazi era, he was an active collaborator with the regime and a member of the German Christians movement, the pro-Hitler offshoot of the Lutheran church. After the fall of the Nazi regime, he prospered by working with the new communist government of East Germany (GDR) as a "Secret Informer" (Geheimer Informator) to the Ministry for State Security ("Stasi"). His commentaries on books of the New Testament were popular and well-read, although his reputation suffered in the 21st century after knowledge of his collaboration with authoritarians became better-known.

Grundmann became a member of the Nazi Party in 1930 (even before they took power) and was from 1933 onwards an active member of the "German Christians." He parlayed this into a position as a professor at the University of Jena, where he eventually became the chair of New Testament studies in the theology department. In this role, he propounded antisemitism and unconditional support for the state. In 1939, he was made head of the newly founded Institute for the Study and Elimination of Jewish Influence on German Church Life in Jena, which was meant to serve state antisemitism by the "Entjudung" (dejudifying) of the Bible and giving antisemitic theological training and arguments for Nazi propaganda. Grundmann propounded an "Aryan" non-Jewish Jesus. Despite his past Nazi activities, Grundmann regained some prestige as a Lutheran theologian in post-war East Germany, publishing various Bible commentaries. By the 1980s these had become standard popular literature. He also spied on other church officials for the Stasi. His cover name was GM Berg ("GM Mountain") after the Sermon on the Mount ("Bergrede").

== Sources ==
- Susannah Heschel: The theological Faculty at the university of Jena as a Stronghold of national Socialism. In: Feingold, Mordechai: History of Universities, Oxford 2003, S. 143–169.
- Susannah Heschel: The Aryan Jesus. Christian Theologians and the Bible in Nazi Germany. Princeton University Press, 2008, ISBN 978-0-691-12531-2 (Online-Informationen).
- (in German) Susannah Heschel: Deutsche Theologen für Hitler. Walter Grundmann und das Eisenacher "Institut zur Erforschung und Beseitigung des jüdischen Einflusses auf das deutsche kirchliche Leben“. In: Jahrbuch 1998/99 zur Geschichte und Wirkung des Holocaust, Darmstadt 1999, S. 147–167.
- (in German) Matthias Wolfes: Protestantische Theologie und moderne Welt – Studien zur Geschichte der liberalen Theologie nach 1918, Berlin/New York 1999 (Theologische Bibliothek Töpelmann, Band 102), S. 366–380.
- (in German) Roland Deines, Volker Leppin, Karl-Wilhelm Niebuhr (Hrsg.): Walter Grundmann – ein Neutestamentler im Dritten Reich. Leipzig 2007
- Max Weinreich: Hitler's Professors: The Part of Scholarship in Germany's Crimes against the Jewish People. 1. Auflage, New York 1946
- (in German) Kurt Meier: Kreuz und Hakenkreuz: Die evangelische Kirche im Dritten Reich. DTB, München 1992
- (in German) Birgit Jerke: Wie wurde das Neue Testament zu einem sogenannten Volkstestament "entjudet“? – Aus der Arbeit des Eisenacher "Instituts zur Erforschung und Beseitung des jüdischen Einflusses auf das deutsche kirchliche Leben“. In: Leonore Siegele-Wenschkewitz (Hg.): Christlicher Antijudaismus und Antisemitismus. Theologische und kirchliche Programme Deutscher Christen, Frankfurt am Main 1994, S. 201–234
- (in German) Leonore Siegele-Wenschkewitz (Hrsg.): Christlicher Antijudaismus und Antisemitismus. Theologische und kirchliche Programme Deutscher Christen. Arnoldshainer Texte, Band 85, Haag + Herchen Verlag, ISBN 3-86137-187-1
