= Dando (surname) =

Dando as a surname can refer to the following people:

- Bill Dando (1932–2022), American football coach and player
- Carolyn Dando, New Zealand actress and soprano
- Edward Dando (c. 1803–1832), British thief
- Evan Dando (born 1967), American musician and member of the band The Lemonheads
- Jill Dando (1961–1999), British television presenter and murder victim
- Joseph Dando (1806–1894), British violinist
- Maurice Dando (1905–1949), English football player
- Shigemitsu Dandō (1913–2012), Japanese criminology expert
- Suzanne Dando (born 1961), British gymnast
- Dando the Tribesmen
