= Glazzard =

Glazzard is a surname. Notable people with the surname include:

- Jimmy Glazzard (1923–1995), British footballer
- Malcolm Glazzard (1931–2012), British footballer

== See also ==
- Gazzard
