= Edgar Ross =

Edgar Ross may refer to:

- Edgar Ross (boxer) (1949–2012), American boxer
- Edgar Ross (communist) (1904–2001), Australian communist
- Edgar Ross, a character in the Red Dead Redemption video games
