= Erhard Domay =

Erhard Domay (30 April 1940, Gießen - 25 June 2012) was a German Protestant theologian, mainly notable as the author and editor of several works on liturgy.

== Life ==
He studied Protestant theology and German studies at the Johannes Gutenberg-Universität Mainz and the Philipps-Universität Marburg from 1960 to 1964.

== Selected works ==
- Erhard Domay: Und es lohnt sich doch. Tagebuch eines Pfarrers, Gütersloh 1977.
- Erhard Domay, Johannes Jourdan und Horst Nitschke (Hg.): Rufe. Religiöse Lyrik der Gegenwart, Band 1 Gütersloh 1979, Band 2 Gütersloh 1981.
- Erhard Domay (ed.): Mit Vertrauen leben. Lesebuch für Gespräche über den Glauben, Band 1 Auf dem Weg zu mir selbst, Stuttgart 1983; Band 2 Auf der Suche nach Gott, Stuttgart 1984.
- Erhard Domay: Dein heiliger Engel sei mit mir. Gedanken und Bilder von den Wegen Gottes in unserer Welt, Lahr 1991.
- Erhard Domay (ed.): Menschenzeit Gotteszeit. Ein Vorlesebuch zum Kirchenjahr für Schule und Gemeinde, Lahr 1992.
- Erhard Domay: Vorlesebuch Symbole. Geschichten zu biblischen Bildwörtern. Für Kinder von 6-12 Jahren, Lahr 1994 3. Auflage.
- Erhard Domay (ed.): Leben in Gemeinschaft mit der Schöpfung. Ein Vorlesebuch für Schule und Gemeinde, Lahr 1994.
- Erhard Domay: Mein Engel hat immer Zeit für mich. Mit sechs farbigen Abbildungen. Verlag Ernst Kaufmann, Lahr 1993. (Katholischer Kinder- und Jugendbuchpreis der Deutschen Bischofskonferenz 1995 Empfehlung)
- Erhard Domay in Zusammenarbeit mit Ursel Heinz: Wende dich zu mir. Gebete mit Sterbenden, Gütersloh 1995.
- Erhard Domay and Hanne Köhler (ed.s): der gottesdienst, Liturgische Texte in gerechter Sprache. Teil 1: Der Gottesdienst, Gütersloh 1997.
- Erhard Domay and Hanne Köhler (ed.s): der gottesdienst, Liturgische Texte in gerechter Sprache. Teil 2: Das Abendmahl/Die Kasualien, Gütersloh 1998.
- Erhard Domay and Hanne Köhler (ed.s): der gottesdienst, Liturgische Texte in gerechter Sprache. Teil 3: Die Psalmen, Gütersloh 1998.
- Erhard Domay and Hanne Köhler (ed.s): der gottesdienst, Liturgische Texte in gerechter Sprache. Teil 4: Die Lesungen, Gütersloh 2001.
- Erhard Domay and Vera-Sabine Winkler, Im Brennglas der Worte. Zeitgenössische Lyrik als Element der Liturgie, Gütersloh 2002.
- Erhard Domay, Spiritualität leben, Gütersloh 2002
- Erhard Domay and Hanne Köhler (ed.s): Werkbuch Gerechte Sprache in Gemeinde und Gottesdienst, Gütersloh 2003.
- Erhard Domay and Hanne Köhler (ed.s): Gottesdienstbuch in gerechter Sprache. Gebete, Lesungen, Fürbitten und Segenssprüche für die Sonn- und Feiertage des Kirchenjahres, Gütersloh 2003.
- Erhard Domay and Hanne Köhler (ed.s): Die Feste im Kirchenjahr. Gottesdienste und Erläuterungen zum Feiern in gerechter Sprache, Gütersloh 2004.
- Erhard Domay, Burkhard Jungcurt and Hanne Köhler (ed.s): Singen von deiner Gerechtigkeit. Das Gesangbuch in gerechter Sprache, Gütersloh 2005.
- Erhard Domay: Neue Gottesdienstgebete. Gebete für alle Sonn- und Feiertage des Kirchenjahres, Gütersloh 2005.
- Margarete Luise Goecke-Seischab and Erhard Domay: Botschaft der Bilder. Christliche Kunst sehen und verstehen lernen, Lahr, 2005, 2. veränderte Auflage (1. Auflage 1990).
- Ulrike Bail, Frank Crüsemann, Marlene Crüsemann, Erhard Domay, Jürgen Ebach, Claudia Janssen, Hanne Köhler, Helga Kuhlmann, Martin Leutzsch and Luise Schottroff (ed.s), Gütersloh 2006, 3. Auflage 2007.
