= Evangelische Arbeitsgemeinschaft für Kirchliche Zeitgeschichte =

German research institute

Protestant Association for Church History
- Evangelische Arbeitsgemeinschaft für Kirchliche Zeitgeschichte
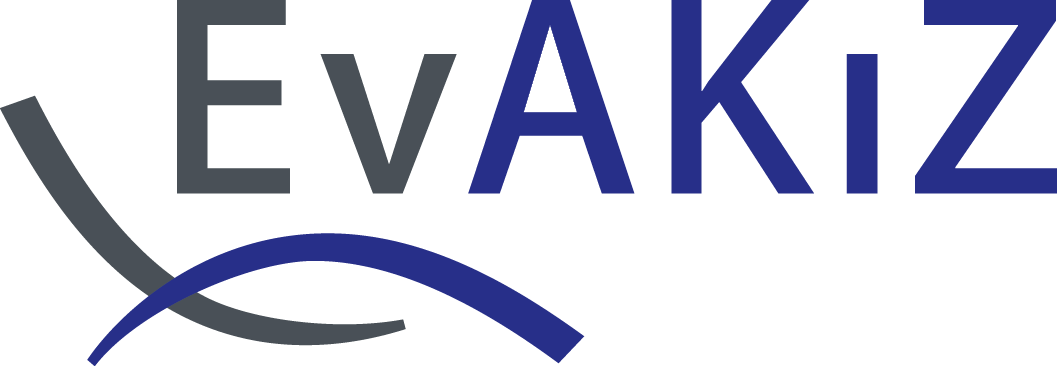
- Active chairman: Christopher Spehr
- Headquarters: Geschwister-Scholl-Platz 1; 80539 Munich, Germany
- Origin: 1955
- Official website: www.kirchliche-zeitgeschichte.info

The Evangelische Arbeitsgemeinschaft für Kirchliche Zeitgeschichte (EvAKiZ) (= Protestant Association for Church History) is concerned with the scientific examination of issues and methods of contemporary church history. Most recent church history is evaluated by the EvAKiZ in scientific autonomy. Its members are representatives of theology, historical science, sociology and history of art. In its editorial series the EvAKiZ publishes contemporary historical sources and scientific surveys of the history of 20th century Protestantism.

== History ==
Appointed by the Council of the Evangelische Kirche in Deutschland (= Evangelical Church in Germany) as „Kommission für die Geschichte des Kirchenkampfes in der nationalsozialistischen Zeit“ (= Commission for the History of the Struggle Between Church and State in the National Socialist Era) in 1955, two charges were assigned to the Evangelischen Arbeitsgemeinschaft für Kirchliche Zeitgeschichte in its early stages: On a universal level, building a bridge between members of the “radical” and the “moderate” Confessing Church and simultaneously providing an initial scientific basis for the study of the history of the Protestant Church during national socialist times by collecting document files, founding a library and editing the „Arbeiten zur Geschichte des Kirchenkampfes“ (Studies on the History of the Struggle between Church and State).

Very soon the EvAKiZ's field of research expanded to the survey of the role of Protestantism in the Weimar Republic and in the period after World War II. At once territorial and everyday history gained in importance. In 1971 the renaming from „Kommission für die Geschichte des Kirchenkampfes in der nationalsozialistischen Zeit“ to „Evangelische Arbeitsgemeinschaft für Kirchliche Zeitgeschichte“ was therefore consequent and documented the thematic diversification as well as a liberalization in direction of social sciences. Complemented with members of the new federal states from 1989 onwards the consortium was engaged in two major research projects concerned with the history of the Protestant Church in the GDR and in the divided Germany.

The second reorientation took place in the 1990s, as the EvAKiZ focused on issues of research on contemporary history in the 1960s and '70s from a more social historical point of view. This broadening of perspective is datable: It was the jubilee symposium on the 50. anniversary of the EvAKiZ in 2005 which issued the relations between Protestantism and social movements in the 1960s and '70s and thereby created a lasting enhancement of the research program. The history of Protestantism during the national socialist era nevertheless remained a focal point which, i. a., resulted in two major projects: a comprehensive anthology on 20th century's Protestant Martyrs and a virtual exhibition about Protestant resistance and its boundaries in Nazi Germany.

== Organization ==
The Evangelische Arbeitsgemeinschaft comprises a commission consisting of twelve regular and two members at large, who relate to contemporary church history due to their research work and professional employment, and further a Research Center for Contemporary Church History, located at the Faculty of Protestant Theology at LMU Munich. The EvAKiZ is an institution of the Evangelische Kirche in Deutschland (EKD) and is operating in scientific autonomy. Following the rules of the EvAKiZ of January 23, 2003, its commission is respectively summoned for six years by the Council of the EKD. The commission decides about research assignments and publications. The Research Center realizes these projects, takes on research assignments in the domain of contemporary church history as well as the management of the commission. It is composed of a director and several scientific associates.

== Members and Staff ==
Members of the Commission
Prof. Dr. Veronika Albrecht-Birkner	Seminary of Protestant Theology, Faculty I, University of Siegen
PD Dr. Gisa Bauer	Department of Protestant Theology, University of Cologne
Prof. Dr. Klaus Fitschen	Faculty of Protestant Theology, Leipzig University
Prof. Dr. Maike Schult	Department of Protestant Theology, Marburg University
Prof. Dr. Siegfried Hermle	Department of Protestant Theology, Faculty of Philosophy, University of Cologne
OKRin Dr. Dorothee Godel	Kirchenamt der Evangelischen Kirche in Deutschland (EKD), Hannover
Prof. Dr. Andreas Müller	Faculty of Protestant Theology, Kiel University
Prof. Dr. Antje Roggenkamp	Faculty of Protestant Theology, University of Münster
Prof. Dr. Christopher Spehr	Faculty of Protestant Theology, LMU Munich
Prof. Dr. Eva-Maria Seng	Department of Historical Sciences, Faculty of Arts and Humanities, University of Paderborn
Prof. Dr. Thomas Martin Schneider	Institute of Protestant Theology, Department II, Faculty of Philology and Cultural Studies, University of Koblenz
Henning Pahl	Evangelical Central Archives in Berlin
Permanent guests
Dr. Norbert Friedrich	Fliedner-Kulturstiftung, Düsseldorf
Dr. Peter Morée	Evangelická teologická fakulta, Praha (Faculty of Protestant Theology, Charles University in Prague)

Active Chairman

Prof. Dr. Christopher Spehr (since 2024)

Vice-chairman

Prof. Dr. Siegfried Hermle (since 2004)

Former Chairmen/Chairwomen

- 1955-1964: D. Kurt Dietrich Schmidt
- 1965-1971: Prof. D. Ernst Wolf
- 1972-1988: Prof. D. Georg Kretschmar
- 1988-2000: Prof. Dr. Joachim Mehlhausen
- September 1998 bis Dezember 1999: Prof. Dr. Leonore Siegele-Wenschkewitz (amtierende Vorsitzende)
- Dezember 1999 bis Februar 2000: Pfarrer i. R. Martin Kramer (kommissarischer Vorsitzender)
- 2000-2003: Prof. Dr. Carsten Nicolaisen
- 2004-2024: Prof. Dr. Harry Oelke

Former Vice-chairmen/Chairwomen

- 1975-1985: Prof. Dr. Klaus Scholder
- 1985-1988: Prof. Dr. Joachim Mehlhausen
- 1988-1998: Prof. Dr. Leonore Siegele-Wenschkewitz
- 2000-2003: OKR i. R. Prof. Dr. Harald Schultze

Former Commission Members (selection)

- Prof. Dr. h.c. Eberhard Bethge
- Dr. Heinz Boberach
- Prof. Dr. Günter Brakelmann
- Prof. Dr. Siegfried Bräuer
- Dr. h.c. Heinz Brunotte
- Prof. Dr. Ursula Büttner
- Prof. Dr. Anselm Doering-Manteuffel
- Prof. Dr. Friedrich Wilhelm Graf
- Prof. Dr. Martin Greschat
- Prof. Dr. Wolf-Dieter Hauschild
- Prof. Dr. Jochen-Christoph Kaiser
- Prof. Dr. Christiane Kuller
- Dr. habil. Katharina Kunter
- Prof. Dr. Inge Mager
- Prof. Dr. Martin Onnasch
- Prof. Dr. Dr. hc. Trutz Rendtorff
- Dr. Hartmut Sander
- Prof. Dr. Jens-Holger Schjørring
- Prof. Dr. Harald Schultze
- Dr. Christa Stache
- Prof. Dr. Peter Steinbach
- Prof. Dr. Christoph Strohm
- Prof. Dr. Rudolf von Thadden
- Prof. Dr. Jörg Thierfelder

Forschungsstelle für Kirchliche Zeitgeschichte (= Research Center For Contemporary Church History)

Director

- Prof. Dr. Claudia Lepp

Research Fellows

- Dr. Karl-Heinz Fix
- Dr. Dagmar Pöpping
- KRin Dr. Nora Andrea Schulze

== Aims and Objectives ==
Aim of the Evangelische Arbeitsgemeinschaft für Kirchliche Zeitgeschichte is the enhancement of scientifically independent study of church history by incitation, implementation and publication of dissertations. The EvAKiZ tries to clarify fundamental scientific questions and pursues cooperation with other institutions in the research field of contemporary history as well as the coordination of contemporary history research projects within the Evangelical Church in Germany. The mission of the commission is implemented by its research and publication activities and the realization of research projects at the research center and organization of expert conferences. Constitutive source editions provide an empirical material base for appropriate studies in contemporary history. Studies emerging from the context of the commission cover the wide range of church historiographical, source-oriented individual questions to fundamental theoretical problems within their own discipline.

Source editions and monographs are endued with separate publication series (Arbeiten zur Kirchlichen Zeitgeschichte, Reihe A: Quellen, Reihe B: Darstellungen).

The annually published „Mitteilungen zur Kirchlichen Zeitgeschichte“ (MKiZ) (= „Minutes on Contemporary Church History”) contain essays on 20th century's German and European church and denomination history; its reports section offers profound information about current activities in the domain of contemporary church history.

== Research Projects ==
Current Research Projects

- Online-Exhibition: Resistance!? Protestant Male and Female Christs in the National Socialist Era.
- Memorial Sites for Protestant Resistants against National Socialism.
- Christianity and Social Changes in the 1960s and 70s
- Social Integration and National Identity
- “Guest Workers Become Citizens”. The Protestant Contribution to Issues of Integration of Migrant Workers in the Federal Republic of Germany (1955–1981).
- The Reports of the Reichsbruderrat of the German Evangelical Church (1934–1937) and the Bruderrat of the Evangelical Church in Germany (1945–1952) – Critical Edition
- Biography of Hans Meiser (1881–1956)
- Hermann Kunst: Status Reports 1951–1977
- The Protestant Churches in Germany 1918/19–1949 – Vol. 2: Regional Church Offices, Institutions and Associations.
- Documents on Church Policy in the Third Reich 1933–1945
- Responsibility for the Church – Stenographic Records and Notes of Regional Bishop Hans Meiser 1933–1945
- ....Approval, Confirmation and Objection. Sources on the History of the Evangelical Lutheran Church in Bavaria during the National Socialist Rule

== Publications ==
- Arbeiten zur Kirchlichen Zeitgeschichte (= Studies on Contemporary Church History)
- Sources (Series A): Vol. 1–19

Since 1975 the Studies on Contemporary Church History (Arbeiten zur Kirchlichen Zeitgeschichte) are published at Vandenhoeck & Ruprecht publishing house on behalf of the Evangelische Arbeitsgemeinschaft für Kirchliche Zeitgeschichte. Editors are the respective chairmen of the commission. In series A sources on 20th century's church history are edited; in series B monographs and anthologies on the history of German Protestantism and its international relations since 1918 are published.

- Comprehensive Reports (Series B): Vol. 1–61
- Arbeiten zur Geschichte des Kirchenkampfes (= Studies on the History of the Struggle between Church and State)

Between 1958 and 1975 the “Studies on the History of the Struggle between Church and State” were published in a series of 29 volumes plus one index volume. They contain e. g. documents on the most significant synods of the Confessing Church, scripts from the time of the church committees (1935–1937) as well as territorial historical or factual monographic displays. In the “supplement series” released from 1964 onwards, mainly territorial historical accounts of contemporary witnesses were published as well as relevant DDR publications incorporated.

- Christentum und Zeitgeschichte (= Christianity and Contemporary History)

Between 2017 an 2023 the series Christianity and Contemporary History were published at the Evangelische Verlagsanstalt in Leipzig. It contains short describtions of topics, that refer to Contemporary History and its relation to Christianity. It is published on behalf of the “Evangelische Arbeitsgemeinschaft für Kirchliche Zeitgeschichte“ by Harry Oelke and Siegfried Hermle.

== Editorial Board ==
- Vol. 1-21: Edited on behalf of the „Commission of the Evangelical Church in Germany for the History of the Struggle between Church and State” by Kurt Dietrich Schmidt in connection with Heinz Brunotte and Ernst Wolf.
- Vol. 22–27: Established by Kurt Dietrich Schmidt. Edited on behalf of the „Commission of the Evangelical Church in Germany for the History of the Struggle between Church and State” by Heinz Brunotte and Ernst Wolf.
- Vol. 28–30: Established by Kurt Dietrich Schmidt. Edited on behalf of the “Evangelische Arbeitsgemeinschaft für Kirchliche Zeitgeschichte“ by Heinz Brunotte and Ernst Wolf at Vandenhoeck & Ruprecht publishing house, Göttingen.
- Mitteilungen zur Kirchlichen Zeitgeschichte (MKiZ) (= Minutes on Contemporary Church History)

The „Minutes on Contemporary Church History“, serialized from 2007 onwards, comprise essays on 20th century's German and European church and denomination history; its reports section offers profound information about current activities in the domain of contemporary church history. The MKiZ are published on behalf of the “Evangelische Arbeitsgemeinschaft für Kirchliche Zeitgeschichte“ by Claudia Lepp and Christopher Spehr. Their prequels were the „Mitteilungen der Evangelischen Arbeitsgemeinschaft für Kirchliche Zeitgeschichte“ 1, 1978ff. The journal is published in print and in Open Access.

== Bibliography ==
- Nicolaisen, Carsten (1 April 1990). "Zwischen Theologie und Geschichte. Zur "Kirchlichen Zeitgeschichte" heute". Der Evangelische Erzieher (in German). 42 (4). Diesterweg: 410–419. doi:10.1515/zpt-1990-0406. ISSN 2366-7796.
- Mehlhausen, Joachim (1993). "Die Evangelische Arbeitsgemeinschaft für Kirchliche Zeitgeschichte und die Erforschung der Kirchengeschichte der DDR". Evangelische Arbeitsgemeinschaft für Kirchliche Zeitgeschichte. Mitteilungen (in German). 13. Evangelische Arbeitsgemeinschaft für Kirchl. Zeitgeschichte: 1–6. ISSN 0949-5908.
- Siegele-Wenschkewitz, Leonore (1993). "Probleme Kirchlicher Zeitgeschichtsforschung". In Siegele-Wenschkewitz, Leonore (ed.). Die evangelischen Kirchen und der SED-Staat – ein Thema kirchlicher Zeitgeschichte. Arnoldshainer Texte. Vol. 77. Frankfurt am Main: Haag + Herchen. pp. 142–151. ISBN 389228959X. OCLC 1091963576.
- Kaiser, Jochen-Christoph (1996). "Wissenschaftspolitik in der Kirche: Zur Entstehung der "Kommission für die Geschichte des Kirchenkampfes in der Nationalsozialistischen Zeit"". In Doering-Manteuffel, Anselm; Nowak, Kurt (eds.). Kirchliche Zeitgeschichte. Urteilsbildung und Methoden. KoGe (in German). Vol. 8. Stuttgart: Kohlhammer. pp. 125–163. ISBN 3170139274.
- Oelke, Harry (2015). "Thesen zur Katholizismusforschung – ein Kommentar". In Damberg, Wilhelm; Hummel, Joseph (eds.). Katholizismus in Deutschland. Zeitgeschichte und Gegenwart. VKZG.B (in German). Vol. 130. Paderborn: Ferdinand Schöningh. pp. 163–168. doi:10.30965/9783657780785_014. ISBN 978-3-506-78078-2.
