= Gazzard =

Gazzard is a surname. Notable people with the surname include:

- Carl Gazzard (born 1982), English cricketer
- Don Gazzard (born 1929), Australian architect, chief architect on Wentworth Memorial Church in Sydney
- Gerry Gazzard (1925–2006), English footballer
- Marea Gazzard (1928–2013), Australian sculptor and ceramicist

== See also ==
- Glazzard
