= Ruben Hayrapetyan =

Armenian football official and politician

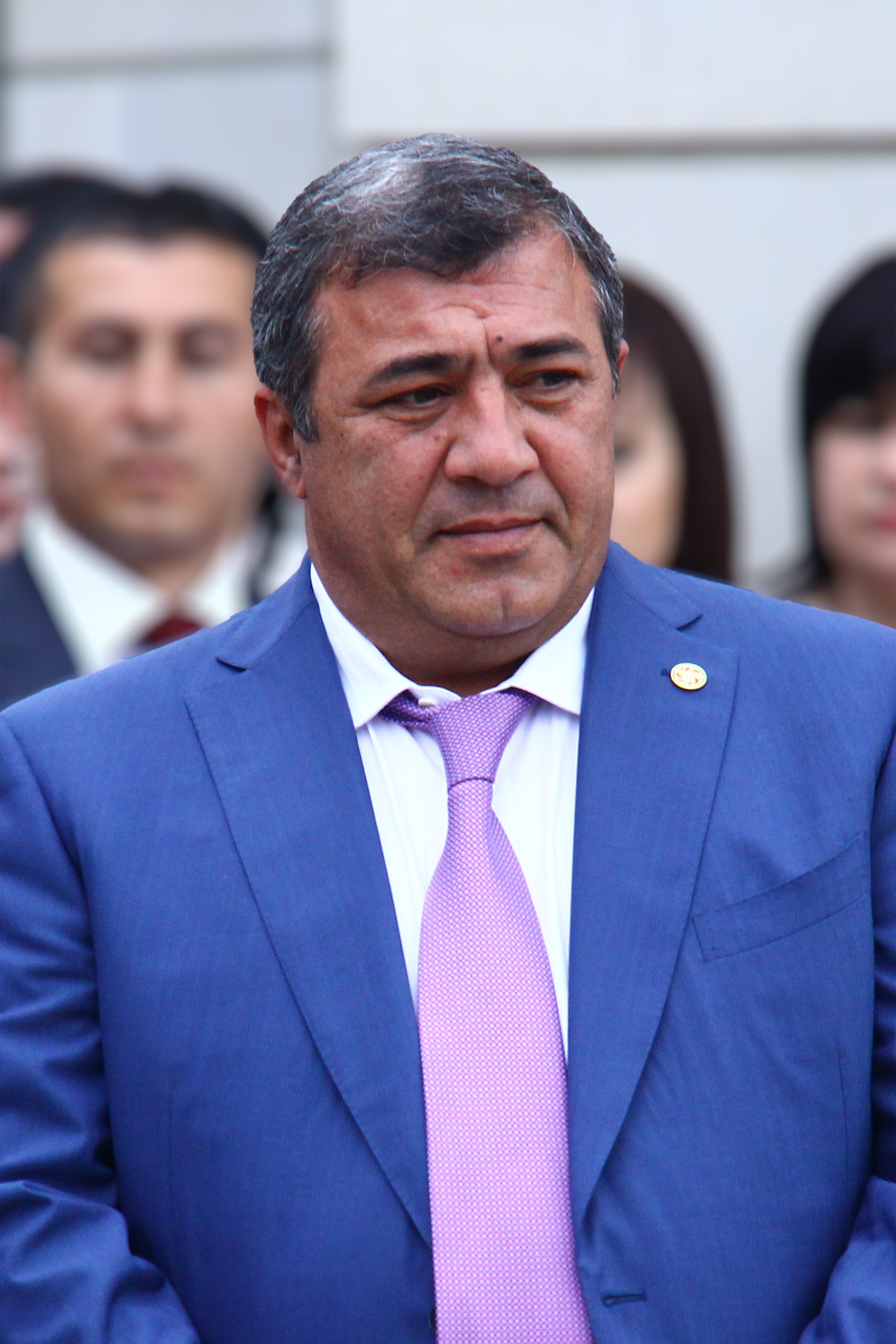
Ruben Hayrapetyan

Ruben Rafiki Hayrapetyan (Armenian: Ռուբեն Ռաֆիկի Հայրապետյան, born 9 March 1963 in Yerevan, Armenia), also known by his nickname Nemets Rubo (Rubo The German), is an Armenian football official, a former member of the Armenian Parliament and a businessman.

Between 2002-2018, Hayrapetyan was the president of the Football Federation of Armenia (FFA). He was elected to the Armenian Parliament twice, in 2003 and 2007. On 3 July 2012 he was forced to step down from Parliament, after the controversial death of an army doctor at a restaurant owned by him.

In 2014, Hayrapetyan started investing in different business projects. Since 2007, he has been a member of the Republican Party of Armenia (RPA). He holds a degree in economics from the Armenian State University of Economics.
