= Roman Catholic Diocese of Mao-Monte Cristi =

Roman Catholic diocese in the Dominican Republic

Diocese of Mao-Monte Cristi Dioecesis Maoënsis–Montis Christi

Location
- Country: Dominican Republic
- Ecclesiastical province: Province of Santiago de los Caballeros
- Metropolitan: Mao

Statistics
- Area: 4,841 km^{2} (1,869 sq mi)
- Population: Total; Catholics: (as of 2004); 400,000; 380,000 (95%)
- Parishes: 22

Information
- Denomination: Roman Catholic
- Rite: Latin Rite
- Established: 16 January 1978 (47 years ago)
- Cathedral: Cathedral of the Holy Cross

Current leadership
- Pope: Francis
- Bishop: Diómedes Antonio Espinal de León

Map

The Roman Catholic Diocese of Mao–Monte Cristi (Latin: Dioecesis Maoënsis–Montis Christi) (erected 16 January 1978) is a suffragan diocese of the Archdiocese of Santiago de los Caballeros.

== Ordinaries ==
- Jerónimo Tomás Abreu Herrera (1978 - 2006)
- Diómedes Antonio Espinal de León (2006 - )

== External links and references ==
- "Diocese of Mao-Monte Cristi". Catholic-Hierarchy.
