= Kinsey Anderson =

Kinsey Amor Anderson (September 18, 1926 – June 11, 2012) was professor emeritus of physics at the University of California at Berkeley (UCB) and an internationally known pioneer of space physics during the early years of rocket, balloon, and satellite exploration of the upper atmosphere, cosmic rays, solar-terrestrial environment, and solar physics.

Anderson was born in Preston, Minnesota. He was the son of Malvin Anderson and Allene (Michener) Anderson. He received his BA in physics from Carleton College in 1949, his PhD in physics from the University of Minnesota under Prof. John Winckler in 1955, and joined the UC Berkeley physics department in 1960. He served in the U. S. Navy in 1945-1946. Anderson was a Guggenheim Fellow in 1959-1960.

During the following decade at UCB he and his students flew instruments on many of the early generation of space science missions, including the Interplanetary Monitoring Platforms (IMP) 1-6, OGO 5, Explorer 33 and 35, and Apollo 15 and 16 lunar sub-satellites. He was an author on about 200 scientific papers, and trained 24 graduate students at Berkeley. He was director of the Space Sciences Laboratory (SSL) at UCB, and a member of the National Academy of Sciences.
