= Kamal Ghanaja =

Kamal Hussein Ghanaja (also known as Nizar Abu Mujahid) was a mid-level military official of Hamas and a former aid to one of its slain external leaders Mahmoud al-Mabhouh. Ghanaja was one of the few Hamas officials that continued to based in the city of Damascus after much of the Syria-based leadership there withdrew from the country as a result of the 2011-2012 Syrian uprising. Following the mass departure, Ghanaja was left in charge of the groups organizational networks within Syria.

== Death ==
On 28 June 2012, Hamas officials reported that Ghanaja was assassinated in his home in the suburb of Qudsaya outside Damascus. Hamas sources stated his "charred, scarred, body was concealed in a ceiling closet and a fire had engulfed the house which apparently the assassins had started." They did not confirm who was behind the killing, although one official blamed the Mossad, Israel's external intelligence agency. Ehud Barak, Israel's Defense Minister responded the allegation was "not necessarily true.". A week later Hamas officials claim that he was killed as a result of accident.

Another Hamas official discounted the conjecture that the Mossad was behind the killing because the Mossad is not brutal or reckless enough to kill him and dispose of the body in the way Ghanaja was by decapitation, placement of his severed body parts in a closet, and torching his apartment. Meanwhile, Syrian opposition activists accused the government of Bashar al-Assad of killing Ghanaja as a warning to the group for abandoning support of the Syrian government during the uprising.

His funeral was held in Amman, Jordan and was attended by his family. Hamas secretary-general Khaled Meshaal and Islamic Action Front leader Sheikh Hammam Said also attended the funeral.
