= Sepp Maier (skier) =

German cross-country skier (1935–2012)

Personal information
- Nationality: German
- Born: 11 May 1935 Sankt Peter, Germany
- Died: 8 June 2012 (aged 77) Sankt Peter, Germany

Sport
- Sport: Cross-country skiing

Josef "Sepp" Maier (11 May 1935 – 8 June 2012) was a German cross-country skier. He competed in the men's 30 kilometre event at the 1960 Winter Olympics.
