= Lucky Diamond (dog) =

Female dog

- Species: Canis lupus familiaris
- Breed: Maltese
- Sex: Female
- Born: Chloe c. 1997; New York City, United States
- Died: June 5, 2012 (aged 14–15); New York, New York, U.S.
- Nationality: American
- Occupation: Pet
- Employer: Animal Fair Media
- Years active: 1999–2012
- Known for: pet of Wendy Diamond
- Owner: Wendy Diamond
- Appearance: White fur
- Awards: Guinness World Record for most photographed dog with celebrities
- www.animalfair.com, https://twitter.com/luckydiamond

Lucky Diamond (c. 1997 – June 5, 2012) was a female Maltese owned by Wendy Diamond, media personality and publisher of Animal Fair Magazine. Lucky is the current Guinness World Record holder for most photographed dog with celebrities.

== Life ==
Diamond adopted Lucky, a homeless dog on the way to the pound, in 1999. She adopted the dog, originally named Chloe, from her personal trainer, Bash Dibra.

Ever since Diamond founded Animal Fair Media and magazine, the first of its kind for animal lovers who support animal rescue, Lucky was her "wing dog." Lucky traveled across the globe to places like Russia, Greece, and Mexico. In meeting and being photographed with celebrities, Lucky helped her owner raise awareness for animal rescue. Lucky was a socialite of the canine world, as she attended events such as the release of Diamond's book It's a Dog's World and fundraisers for associations like The Humane Society.

In January 2012, Lucky was diagnosed with spleen cancer. Despite receiving top veterinary care, she died on June 5, 2012.

== Personality ==
"Everyone else should be so lucky to have such a charismatic and patient dog like I do," according to Diamond.

== Accomplishments ==
Along with Diamond, Lucky was one of the celebrity grand marshals for the 2010 Krewe of Barkus Mardi Gras parade on February 7, 2010, in New Orleans, Louisiana. Lucky accompanied Wendy as Spokes Dog to the unveiling of the Katrina Pet Memorial for the animal victims of Hurricane Katrina. The Humane Society of New York named a wing after Lucky.

== Guinness World Record ==
Lucky started posing for pictures with celebrities at a soiree in 2002. Hugh Grant was the first celebrity to have his picture taken with the Maltese. By November 2011, Lucky Diamond had posed for 363 photos with celebrities including Bill Clinton, Rosie O'Donnell, Kim Kardashian, Maria Sharapova, Kanye West, Betty White, Richard Branson, Barbara Walters, Hoda Kotb, Amanda Bynes, Cloris Leachman, Kelly Ripa, Kathy Griffin, Hugh Hefner, Jessica Biel, Adrien Brody, and Kristen Stewart. She has been photographed with more celebrities than any other animal. As of 2012, Lucky Diamond is still the record-holder.
