= Edward Andersson =

Finnish legal scholar (1933–2012)

Edward Andersson (31 December 1933 – 14 June 2012) was a Finnish legal scholar.

He took his doctoral degree in 1963 and was a professor in public law at the University of Helsinki from 1965 to 1998. Becoming an expert on tax law in particular, he also served as prorector from 1971 to 1983. He was a member of the Norwegian Academy of Science and Letters from 1988.

He was born in Helsinki and died in Espoo. However, he resided in Grankulla where he was elected to the municipal council in 1969, representing the Swedish People's Party of Finland. He then served as mayor from 1977 to 2003.
