= Frank Crüsemann =

- Born: 9 July 1938 (age 88); Bremen, Germany

Academic work
- Discipline: Biblical studies
- Institutions: Bethel Church College
- Main interests: social history of the Old Testament
- Notable works: The Torah : theology and social history of Old Testament law

Frank Crüsemann (born 9 July 1938 in Bremen) is a German Old Testament scholar, biblical critic, and emeritus professor at Bethel Church College from 1980 to 2004. He is known for his publications on the Torah, Elijah and the social history of the Old Testament, and his participation in Christian–Jewish reconciliation and the German Evangelical Church Assembly.

== Biography ==
Crüsemann was born in Bremen in 1938 to Gustav and Jutta Crüsemann. He has been married in a second marriage to Marlene Crüsemann, a New Testament student, since 1982, and has a daughter, Nicola Crüsemann (from her first marriage), and a son.

Crüsemann was a member of the Christian Peace Conference and participant in the 1st and 2nd All-Christian Peace Meetings in Prague in 1961 and 1964, respectively.

On 31 October 2008 (Reformation Day), alongside Ulrich Duchrow, Heino Falcke, Christian Felber, Kuno Füssel, Detlef Hensche, Siegfried Katterle, Arne Manzeschke, Silke Niemeyer, Franz Segbers, Ton Veerkamp and Karl Georg Zinn, he was the first of Aufrufs Frieden mit dem Kapital? Ein Aufruf wider die Anpassung der Evangelischen Kirche an die Macht der Wirtschaft (Calling peace with capital? A call against the adjustment of the Evangelical Church to the power of the economy).

== Contributions ==
Crüsemann studies Christian practices in dealing with the Old Testament in the New Testament. He demonstrates that the view of the New Testament and thus also of Jesus is shaped by dogmatic developments, some of which obscure the view of biblical texts and do not allow certain perspectives. He shows that in all New Testament writings the "Old Testament" is recognized as a given "holy scripture" and has authority.

According to Besprochen von Thomas Kroll, "Frank Crüsemann is now trying a new approach by interpreting the relationship between the two parts from himself and thus offering a completely new perspective on Christianity and Judaism."

== Bibliography ==
=== Books ===
- Crüsemann, F. (1978). Der Widerstand gegen das Koenigtum: Die antiköniglichen Texte des Alten Testamentes und der Kampf um den frühen israelitischen Staat. Wissenschaftliche Monographien zum Alten und Neuen Testament (in German). Neukirchen-Vluyn : Neukirchener Verlag. ISBN 9783788705350. OCLC 4503492.
- Crüsemann, F. (1983). Bewahrung der Freiheit: Das Thema des Dekalogs in sozialgeschichtlicher Perspektive. Kaiser-Traktate. Vol. 78. ISBN 9783459015184. OCLC 10894674.
- Crüsemann, F. (1992). Die Tora: Theologie und Sozialgeschichte des alttestamentlichen Gesetzes. München: Kaiser.
- Crüsemann, F. (1996). The Torah : theology and social history of Old Testament law. Minneapolis: Fortress Press. ISBN 9780567085245. OCLC 35280871.
- Das Alte Testament als Wahrheitsraum des Neuen: Die neue Sicht der christlichen Bibel. Gütersloher Verlagshaus-Haus. 2011. ISBN 9783579081229. OCLC 725583132.

=== Articles ===
- Crüsemann, F. (1969). "Studien zur Formgeschichte von Hymnus und Danklied in Israel". Wissenschaftliche Monographien zum Alten und Neuen Testament (in German). 32.
