= Mako Tabuni =

Mako Tabuni

Mako Tabuni (died June 14, 2012) was a Papua New Guinea activist for Papuan interests, and the deputy chairman of the National Committee for West Papua.

== The National Committee for West Papua (KNPB) ==
On 19 November 2008 the National Committee for West Papua (abbreviated KNPB, Komite Nasional Papua Barat) was established by a number of Papuan ngo's. The KNPB campaigns for the right to self-determination for the people of Papua of West New Guinea. This right was withheld from the Papuans in 1969 with the Act of Free Choice, which was rigged. The KNPB advocates a referendum to determine the political future of West Papua (i.e. West New Guinea). It cooperates for this purpose with the International Parliamentarians for West Papua (IPWP) and the International Lawyers for West Papua (ILWP).; Mako Tabuni was born in Wamena. Mako and members of his family were themselves victims of human rights violations in West Papua, 1980.

=== Killing ===
In May 2012, a German tourist, Pieter Dietmar Helmut was non-fatally shot while swimming with his wife in Base G beach, the perpetrators were later revealed to be members of extremist faction of KNPB led by Mako Tabuni, three members were later caught and charged with manslaughter.

On June 14, 2012, Mako was killed, as he was walking near his home in Waena, without any further warning by Indonesian police in plain clothes, sparking massive and violent protests and riots. Activists have since claimed that Tabuni was killed intentionally, which is a breach of the law. The police spokesman said that he was shot because he resisted arrest. However, the police view was challenged by eyewitnesses. These also claimed that Mako was still alive when he entered the police hospital in Jayapura and that he died while in police custody.

=== Response ===
Indonesia President Susilo Bambang Yudhoyono conceded that the Indonesian security forces have overreacted at times but also mentioned that the attacks were "on a small scale with limited victims."

In an official statement, national police chief General Timur Pradopo said that Tabuni was killed after he grabbed a weapon from a policeman attempting to arrest him and escaped, while also adding that investigation revealed that Tabuni had a loaded gun with 18 bullets. He was wanted for "causing unrest in the province", according to Papua police chief Major General Bigman Lumban Tobing.

Representatives of the Commission for the Disappeared and Victims of Violence, who interviewed eyewitnesses, stated that Tabuni was suddenly and unexpectedly shot dead by an ununiformed gunman as he walked alone near a housing complex. Following Tabuni's death, a large group of furious protesters went on a rampage in Jayapura, many of them carrying machetes and arrows. Shops were closed during the mass riots, and many citizens were afraid to leave their homes. But as the outrage worsens, tribal and independence leaders from are urging their followers to maintain discipline, fearing that a violent reaction will give the Indonesian police the justification they need to destroy the independence movement. Said political prisoner Selphius Bobii,

The killing of Tabuni is part of a scenario to destroy the Papuan struggle's commitment to a peaceful path and push Papuans towards violence. So let's control ourselves. Don't get caught in this scenario which will only weaken our peaceful struggle that right now is echoing across our country and up to the UN

=== Funeral ===
After Tabuni's death, police authorities initially refused to pass his body to his family, saying that they would perform Tabuni's burial themselves. They changed later their decision. Then, Tabuni's family could collect his body from the Bhayangkara Police Hospital, ahead of the burial, which took place on June 16, 2012, in Wamena.
