= Roman Bazan =

Polish footballer

Personal information
- Date of birth: 19 August 1938
- Place of birth: Chorzów, Poland
- Date of death: 20 June 2012 (aged 73)
- Place of death: Sosnowiec, Poland
- Height: 1.72 m (5 ft 8 in)
- Positions: Forward; defender

Youth career
- –1958: Start Chorzów

Senior career*
Years	Team	Apps	(Gls)
1958–1959	Stal Sosnowiec		
1959–1960	Śląsk Wrocław		
1960–1973	Zagłębie Sosnowiec		
1973–1974	Calais		

International career
1963–1968	Poland	21	(2)
- * Club domestic league appearances and goals

Roman Bazan (19 August 1938 – 20 June 2012) was a Polish footballer.

He is the most capped player for Zagłębie Sosnowiec in the Polish top flight, with 304 appearances.

He played in 21 matches for the Poland national team from 1963 to 1968.

== Honours ==
Zagłębie Sosnowiec

- Polish Cup: 1961–62, 1962–63
- International Soccer League: 1964
