= Amar Goswami =

Indian writer (1945–2012)

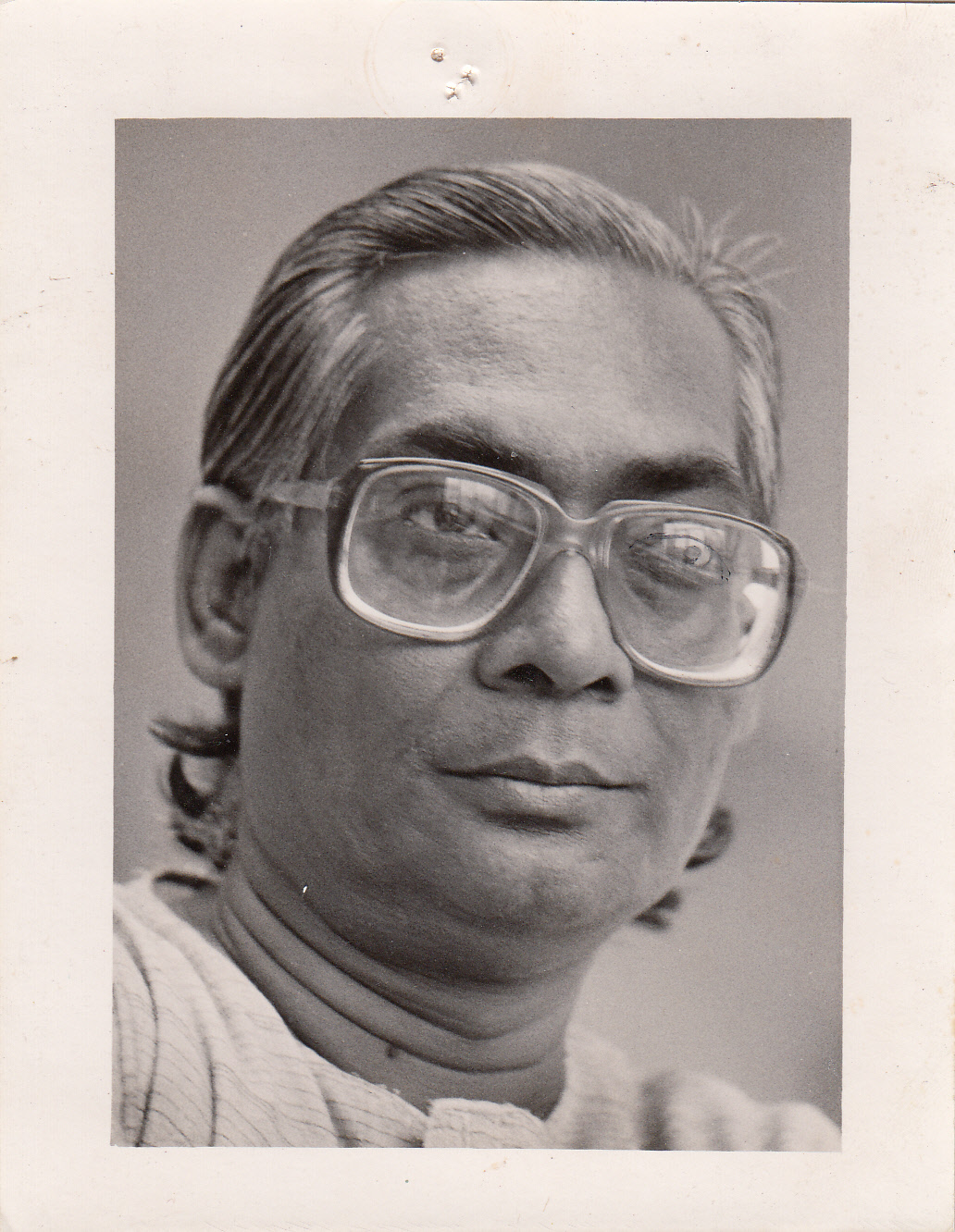
- Born: Amar Goswami; 28 November 1945; Multan, Punjab Province, British India
- Died: 26 June 2012 (aged 66); Ghaziabad, Uttar Pradesh, India
- Occupations: Writer and journalist
- Writing career
- Pen name: Amar Goswami
- Period: 1945–2012
- Genres: Novel, short story, essay
- Notable works: Hawa Ke Virudh,Is Daur Mein Hamsafar,Sabash Munnu
- Notable awards: Hindi Kendriya Nirdeshalay – 1987–88, Bal & Kishore Sahitya Samman, Hindi Academy, Delhi 2003–04,Dr Ram Lal Verma Samman – 2006 (Sahitya Kala Parishad), Indo-Russian Literary Club (Russian Centre of Science & Culture) – 1999

Amar Goswami (28 November 1945 – 26 June 2012) was a senior journalist and one of the prominent fiction writers of Hindi literature. His work includes satires, short stories, poems, novels, novelettes and translations from Bengali to Hindi. He was associated with Kathantar, Vikalp, Aagamikal, Sampa, Manorama, Ganga, Sunday Observer (Hindi), Bharti Features, Uxhur Bharat, Bharatiya Jnanpith, Remadhav Publications. His stories have been aired on All India Radio and short films have been made on his stories.

== Biography ==
=== Early life ===
He was born in Multan, British India, into one of the affluent Bengali Brahmin families. At the age of 2, his family moved from Multan (now in Pakistan) to Mirzapur, Uttar Pradesh. He graduated with an MA (Hindi), Shahitya Shiromani (gold medalist) and Shahitya Ratna from Allahabad University.

=== Early influences ===
He used to live in his ancestral house in Mirzapur, and he found a Pandora's Box of Hindi literature in the collection of "Saraswati" editions. As a child he was influenced by the literary articles published in the Saraswati magazine, and started writing at a very early age. He was one of the regular members of the school debate team and won several debate and writing competitions. In his adolescent, he started writing poems and started reciting poems in literary groups and meeting conducted by Rotary Club, Mirzapur. He has also written a book on history of Mirzapur.

=== Allahabad and inclination towards prose ===
He moved to Allahabad to study. commerce, at Allahabad University. Allahabad was considered at that time the literary capital of India. He became associated with stalwarts of Hindi literature like Sumitranandan Pant, Shailesh Matiyani, Naresh Mehta, Mahadevi Verma, Ilaychand Joshi and many more. He became one of the regular features of literally meetings (Sahitic Ghosthi). During that time he wrote many stories, which were broadcast on All India Radio and published in Hindi dailies like Aaj, Dainik Bhaskar, and various other magazines. He also published a literally magazine "Kathantar" and associated with Vikalp (a magazine of Late Shri. Shailesh Matiyani), Aagamikaal (a magazine of Late Shri Naresh Mehta) and Manorama (Mitra Prakashan) and Sampa (Children Magazine)

Vaichariki days

Amar Goswami formed a group to organise literary meetings named "Vaichariki" in Allahabad. The literally meeting (sahitic ghosti) was an open forum where all the participants used to discuss and share their views about the most recent works of the Hindi writers of the time. It used to happen once in a month where the guest speaker used to preside in the meeting and start the discussion about the recent works of participants. The meetings featured most of the prominent Hindi writers like Sumitranandan Pant, Illaichand Joshi, Naresh Mehta, Shailesh Matiyani and many more

=== Delhi and focus on cosmopolitan life ===
After coming to Delhi, he changed his style of writing, which included the life, problems and the struggle of common man and middle class society in the metropolitan city. He used his wit to highlight the struggle of the common man and he wrote some of the masterpieces like Kalakar, Harap Ram Gadap, Buzo Bahadur, Juta, Apna Utsav, Govind Gatha etc.

His first collection of short stories "Himayati" was published in 1986, since then more than 25 books, which includes collection of short stories, novel, children books and books especially written for National Book Trust campaign on Adult Education were published. Also, he translated more than 70 books from Bengali to Hindi. He was also a part of expert panel of NCERT workshops conducted on syllabus design and selection of stories for Hindi subject.

== Style of writing ==
He is considered to be a master of satirical writing. His writing often focuses on the problems of the common man, such as the super fast life of metropolitan areas, human relations, corruption, social discrimination, poverty, and government policies. He also focused on different aspects of human nature (preachers don't follow what they preach). He was able to connect people with his writing.

== Is Daur Mein Hamsafar ==
This is the only published of the two novels that have been written by him. The main character of this novel is Ananya who epitomises the empowerment of women in the India.

== Translation ==
He has devoted equal time in translating masterpieces of Bengali writers from Bengali to Hindi. He always wanted to make people aware of the great books written in Bengali language. He used to say that "readers should not be deprived of reading the great works due to the language constraints; and he is contributing his share by translating some works of the Bengali writers in Hindi."

He has translated more than 70 books of the prominent writers including Rabindranath Tagore, Taslima Nasrin, Tarashankar Bandhopadyay, Ramanath Ray, Bibhutibhusan Bandopadyay, Nazrul Islam, Satyajit Ray and many more

== Literary works ==
- Himayati
- Mahuye Ka Ped
- Dhartiputra, ISBN 978-81-86480-02-1
- Udhas Raghodas
- Aranya Mein Hum
- Buzo Bahadur
- Bhool Bulayya
- Apni Apni Duniya
- Kal Ka Bharosa
- Mahabali
- Ikkis Kahaniya
- Is Daur Mein Humsafar

Sudama Ki Mukti (Book written for Adult Education Campaign by National Book Trust)

== Children books ==
Amar Goswami ki Chuninda Bal kahaniya ( Published by National Book trust- year 2016 )

- Tunni Machli
- Tinku Ki Chattri
- Jiddi Patang
- Sher Singh Ka Chasma
- Sabash Munnu
- Cloud Ice-Cream
- Drip-Drop-Drip
