= Kevin Easton =

Australian rules footballer

Personal information
- Full name: Kevin William Easton
- Born: 7 October 1932
- Died: 17 June 2012 (aged 79)
- Original team: Brunswick Amateurs
- Height: 193 cm (6 ft 4 in)
- Weight: 91 kg (201 lb)

Playing career^{1}
Years	Club	Games (Goals)
1952–56	North Melbourne	28 (29)
- ^{1} Playing statistics correct to the end of 1956.

Kevin Easton (7 October 1932 – 17 June 2012) was an Australian rules footballer who played with North Melbourne in the Victorian Football League (VFL).
