= Death of Vahe Avetyan =

Death of doctor from brain injury

- Vahe Avetyan
- Time: 18:15 PM
- Location: Central military hospital, Yerevan
- Cause: Brain injury, coma
- Burial: July 2, 2012
- Charges: CC of RA, 6th and 14th points of 2nd section of 112th article, 1st and 3rd points of 2nd section of 113th article, 118th article

Vahe Avetyan (Armenian: Վահե Ավետյան, August 2, 1979 – June 29, 2012) was an Armenian doctor, medical serviceman major of the Armed Forces of Armenia, who died on June 29, 2012, in coma, from brain injury. His death received much publicity and media attention in the Armenian society. Avetyan went into coma after being beaten in the "Harsnakar" restaurant, which belongs to a member of Armenian parliament, at that time, Ruben Hayrapetyan.

Avetyan graduated from the Yerevan State Medical University, he was an otolaryngologist since 2004. He served at the central military hospital of the Ministry of Defence.

== Fight and background ==
In the evening of June 17, 2012, a group of doctors, Vahe Avetyan among them, visited the restaurant. Avetyan was in sport clothes, which did not meet the restaurant dress requirements, so Avetyan with his friends got changed and then returned in permissible attire. The quarrel occurred on about 11:00 PM between Avetyan and a waiter because of Vahe's clothing situation. The fighting began after he hit the waiter,. The medical officers Vahe Avetyan, Edgar Mikoyan, Arkadi Aghajanyan, Garik Soghomonyan, and Artak Baiadyan were beaten by Harsnakar employees and security. Vahe Avetyan and Artak Baiadyan were taken to the hospital afterward. On June 18, at around 3:00 AM Avetyan underwent brain surgery, and after one more skull surgery he stayed in coma until his death on June 29. The approximate time of death was 6:15 AM.

== Criminal case and public reaction ==
The case was first sent from the police to the investigation service of the Defence Ministry. Afterward, the case was transferred to the police investigation general bureau, and the police made an announcement on that. A criminal prosecution was made according to the 1st section of the 112th article of the Armenian Criminal Code:

"Infliction of willful bodily damage which is dangerous for life or caused loss of eyesight, speech, hearing or any organ, loss of functions of the organ, or was manifested in irreversible ugliness on face, as well as caused other damage dangerous for life or caused disorder... is punished with imprisonment for the term of 3 to 7 years."
