= Gérard Théodore =

- Born: 28 November 1920; Paris, France
- Died: 10 June 2012 (aged 91) Paris, France
- Buried: Nogent-sur-Marne, France
- Allegiance: France
- Conflicts: World War II
- Awards: Compagnon de la Libération

Gérard Théodore (November 28, 1920 – June 10, 2012) was a French Compagnon de la Libération, having received the Ordre de la Libération for his role in the Liberation of France during World War II.

== Biography ==
Théodore was born in Paris on November 28, 1920. He enlisted in the Free French Forces in London in July 1940 following the fall of France. Théodore was assigned to the artillery and sent to battles in Dakar, French West Africa (present-day Senegal), Eritrea and the French Mandate of Syria and the Lebanon.

Théodore was sent to Libya as part of 1st Free French Brigade under the command of General Marie-Pierre Kœnig. There, Théodore was severely wounded at the Battle of Bir Hakeim on June 8, 1942. He lost much of his left leg when he was hit by German shrapnel.

He was inducted as a Compagnon de la Libération in September 1942, just months after Bir Hakeim. He was also made a Grand Officier of the Légion d'honneur and received the Croix de Guerre.

Professionally, Théodore worked as a statistician and inspector general with the INSEE.

In 2012, though in failing health, Théodore granted an interview for a France 3 documentary on the Battle of Bir Hakeim. The film aired on France 3 on June 6, 2012, just days before his death.

Gérard Théodore died on June 10, 2012, in Paris at the age of 91. His death left just twenty-six living Compagnon de la Libération left, out of the original 1,038 recipients. Théodore died just two days after the passing of another Compagnon, former government minister Robert Galley.
