= Romuald Drobaczyński =

Polish director (1930–2012)

Romuald Drobaczyński (12 November 1930 – 19 June 2012, Gdańsk, Poland) was a Polish film director who also worked in film dubbing. In 1959, he graduated from the directing department at the National Film School in Łódź.

== Director of dubbing ==
- 1998: Scooby Doo on Zombie Island
- 1995-1997: Freakazoid!
- 1979: Scooby Doo Goes Hollywood
- 1972: Gentlemen of Fortune
- 1971: Êtes-vous fiancée à un marin grec ou à un pilote de ligne ?
- 1971: Dívka na koštěti
- 1971: Młynarczyk i kotka
- 1970: Kapitan Korda
- 1970: Uncle Vanya
- 1970: The Twelve Chairs
- 1969-1972: Scooby Doo, Where Are You!
- 1969: Kochanka buntownika
- 1969: Ring of Bright Water
- 1969: The Brothers Karamazov
- 1969: We'll Live Till Monday
- 1969: Run Wild, Run Free
- 1969: Die Lederstrumpferzählungen
- 1968: Brat doktora Homera
- 1967: Szevasz, Vera!
- 1966: Anděl blažené smrti
- 1966: Born Free
- 1964: Gde ty teper, Maksim?
- 1964: Follow Me, Scoundrels
- 1963: Slepaja ptica
- 1963: Janosik
- 1963: All remains to people
- 1963: Inspektorat i noshtta
- 1963: Koroleva benzokolonki
- 1963: Strach
- 1963: The Wrong Arm of the Law
- 1962: Amphibian Man
- 1962: The Prince and the Pauper
- 1961: Parce plavog neba
- 1961: Harry and the Butler
- 1961: V nachale veka
- 1960: Hunted in Holland
- 1959: Tajemniczy szyfr
- 1958: H-8
- 1958: Udivitelnaya istoriya, pokhozhaya na skazki
- 1958: Skrzynki na start
- 1957: Wieczór kawalerski
- 1957: Otryad Trubachyova srazhayetsya
- 1957: Two Confessions
- 1956: Herbaciarnia "Pod Księżycem"
- 1956: Ora H
- 1953: Piotruś Pan
- 1952: La Minute de vérité
- 1950: Wszystko o Ewie

Along with:

- Dwie strony medalu
- Ali and the Camel
- Handlarze opium
- Przystanek komisariat
- Please Turn Over
- Ot semi do dvenadtsati (kinoalmanakh)
- Barbara the Fair with the Silken Hair
- Listy miłosne

== Director ==
- 1967: Pieczona gęś
- 1962: Jadą goście jadą...
- 1958: Miasteczko

== Secondary director ==
- 1988-1991: Pogranicze w ogniu
- 1985: Urwisy z Doliny Młynów
- 1985: Rajska jabłoń
- 1983: Lata dwudzieste... lata trzydzieste...
- 1980-2000: Dom
- 1978: Życie na gorąco
- 1975: Kazimierz Wielki
- 1973: Nie będę Cię kochać

== Writer ==
- 1958: Miasteczko

== Actor ==
- 1988-1991: Pogranicze w ogniu − Dyrektor polskiego wywiadu
- 1987: Misja specjalna − Aktor
- 1985: Dziewczęta z Nowolipek − Policjant
- 1983: Lata dwudzieste... lata trzydzieste... − Żwirski, dyrektor teatru "Miraż"
- 1980-2000: Dom − Professor Politechniki, wykładowca Andrzeja
- 1978: Życie na gorąco − Radca ambasady austriackiej w Budapeszcie
- 1975: Kazimierz Wielki
- 1973: The Hourglass Sanatorium
- 1969: Rzeczpospolita babska − Bukała
- 1969: Księżyc − Białogwardzista
- 1962: Jadą goście jadą... − Mieszkaniec Orawki
- 1958: Miasteczko − Strażak
