= Renate Damm =

German bicycle racer

- Born: January 11, 1947; East Berlin, East Germany
- Died: June 27, 2012 (aged 65); Berlin, Germany
- Occupation: Bicycle racer
- Years active: 1960s—1970s

Renate Damm (11 January 1947 - 27 June 2012) was a German road bicycle racer.

Damm began her cycling career at ASG Strausberg and was transferred to TSC Berlin because of her talents. Later she raced for BSG Lok Oberspree. From the end of the 1960s until the early 1970s she was one of the dominating racers in the GDR both on road and track. She won the GDR road racing championships five times between 1968 and 1972 - the first time in 1968 after a solo ride of 40 km. Between 1970 and 1972 she won the 500 m time trial, after being third in 1968. In the individual pursuit she won twice (1970, 1971) and placed second twice (1968, 1969). She won the sprint title in 1970 and 1971.

Damm died in 2012 at the age of 65 in Berlin after a long illness.
