= Mohamed Elrawi =

Mohamed Fakhry Elrawi Aboutaha (Arabic: د. محمد فخري الراوي ابوطه, June 22, 1935 – June 6, 2012) was an Egyptian Public Administration scholar and professor. He was a professor of public administration in International, Arab and Egyptian universities. Dr. Elrawy was heavily involved and passionate about Egyptian politics: his courage, braveness, and popularity crowned him as head of the Students' Union of Cairo University.

== Family and personal life ==
Elrawi was born in Bahgoura, Quena, Egypt. He was one of five children of Fakhry Elrawi. Elrawi is married to Sabria Zaki, an early-childhood teacher. They have three children: a son, Waleed, who is a banker living in Cairo; Amr, who is a marketing manager living in London; and a daughter, Mai, who is studying at the American University in Cairo.

== Early career ==
Elrawi earned his secondary school education from Daud Takla, Bahgour school, then moved to Saadia High School in Giza. He was obsessed with politics since he was a child, hence his dream was to be a lawyer like Saad Zagloul and many other political figures at the time.

Elrawy earned a bachelor's degree in political science from Wisconsin State University in the United States in 1967, a master's degree in political science from Western Illinois University in the US in 1969, and a Ph.D. from Southern Illinois University in the US in 1975.

His academic employment career began in 1973, in Wisconsin University, EAU Claire, US as an assistant professor, Department of Political Science, Teaching Public Administration and State and Local Government (American Government). From 1975 to 1977, he was assistant professor, Department of Management, Al-Mustansiriya University in Iraq, teaching Organization Theory, Management Principles, and Personnel Administration.

== Academic career ==
- 1993–2010 — Professor, American University in Cairo, Egypt, teaching the following courses at the MPA Program:
  - Theory and Practice of Public Administration.
  - Public Personnel Administration.
  - Administrative Environment and Public Policy in Egypt.
  - Problems of Development Administration.
  - Comparative Administration.
  - Local Government and Development
- 1995–1998 — Visiting professor, Faculty of Commerce (English Section). Teaching Public Administration.
- 1987–1989 — Visiting professor, Faculty of Economics and Political Science and Commerce, Cairo University, Graduate Studies. Teaching Local Administration, Public Administration and Comparative Local Government.
- 1986–1990 — (Part Time) Project Analyst at Industry and Trade Consultant Company (ITCO).
- 1986–1987 — Visiting professor, Department of Public Administration, Faculty of Administration and Economics, University of Qatar. Teaching Public Administration. 1980–1987, (Part Time) Professor, :Department of Economics and Political Science, . Teaching Administrative Development.
- 1977–1978 — Assistant Professor, Department of Management, Al Basra University, Iraq. Teaching Public Administration & Research Methodology.
- 1975–1977 — Assistant Professor, Department of Management, Al Mustansriua University, Iraq. Teaching Organization Theory, Management Principles, and Personnel Administration.
- 1973–1974 — Assistant Professor, Department of Political Science, Wisconsin University, EAU Claire, USA. Teaching Public Administration and State and Local Government (American Government).

== Profissional career ==
Elrawi contributed not only to academia: he was also very active in practical and social experiences and activities.

- 1989–1996 — He was the Chairman of Board of Directors, for Data Care Company (Hardware, Software and Training Company).
- 1985–1986 — Member of UNICEF Central Steering Committee of Egypt, for UNICEF Activities in Rural Areas.
- 1983–1985 — Member of the Civil Service Development Committee, National Specialized Council (An Advisory Board for President of Arab Republic of Egypt).
- 1982–1983 — Member of the Study Team, Commissioned by the United Nations Dar El Handasah, Development Program (UNDP Project EGY 173/022), Undertake a Regional Development Planning Study for Region 8, Consultant on Local and Rural Institutions.
- 1981–1982 — Local Government Authority Examination of Public Policy and Delivery System with Regard to Education and Health Service in Rural Areas.
- 1979–Present — Advisor to Head of Central Agency for Organization and Management with reference to Local Government Organization (Personnel Training and Development).
- 1976–1977 — Consultant to Ministry of Higher Education, Iraq. Concerned with Curriculum Development of Public Administration for Iraqi Universities.
- 1975–1978 — Participation in Training Programs, Institute of Administrative Development and Training, Government of Iraq.

== Works ==
=== Books ===
- Public Administration: A System Approach (Professional Press, Cairo, 1983).

=== Journals ===
- “How to Manage the New Urban Communities", Al Ahram, Feb. 5, 2001.
- “Local Administration and New Cities", Al Ahram, August 9, 2000.
- “The Government Administration and Challenges of Development", Al Ahram, Feb. 12, 1997.
- “Is There any Initiatives by Government Administration Towards Development?” Al Ahram, March 31, 1996.
- “Problems of the Existing Situation and the Population Conference”, Al Ahram, September 13, 1994.
- “Marginalization and Youth Alienation…for How Long?”, Al Ahram, July 25, 1994.
- “Administration of Great Urban Centers Paper Presented at Tokyo Round Table”, Al Ahram, 13–17 September 1981, the International Institute of Administrative Science.
- “External Control and Administrative Development”, Management Magazine, Al Ahram, October 1980. Democracy Administrative.
- “Development in Developing Countries”, Management Magazine, Al Ahram, June, 1980.
- “Public Administration in Developing Countries”, Management and Economics Magazine, Al-Mustansria University, Al Ahram, 1977.
