= Erica Kennedy =

American novelist

- Born: Erica Kennedy Johnson; March 24, 1970; Queens, New York, U.S.
- Died: c. June 13, 2012 (aged 42); Miami Beach, Florida, U.S.
- Education: Sarah Lawrence College; Oxford University
- Occupations: Author, journalist
- Writing career
- Notable work: Bling

Erica Kennedy (March 24, 1970 – c. June 13, 2012) was an American author, blogger, news correspondent, fashion journalist, and singer. Her 2004 novel Bling, became a New York Times bestseller. In 2010, she was named to the list of 100 most influential African Americans, as published by Ebony magazine and known as the "Ebony Power 100".

== Personal background ==
Erica Kennedy Johnson was born on March 24, 1970. Her father died when she was 17 years old. Her mother, Mary Mobley Johnson, was an interior designer. She was raised in Bayside, Queens, with her brother, Kirk Johnson. Kennedy attended Sarah Lawrence College and Oxford University, earning her bachelor's degree in liberal arts from Sarah Lawrence in 1992.

Kennedy was the best friend of model and television personality Kimora Lee Simmons, serving as the maid of honor at her wedding to Russell Simmons and godmother to their daughters, Ming and Aoki.

== Professional background ==
Following her college graduation, Kennedy started her career working as a publicist with various top fashion designers including Tommy Hilfiger and Sean Combs. She worked as a special news correspondent for the New York Daily News before writing on fashion and entertainment for Vibe, InStyle, Paper, and Elle UK. Kennedy received her job at InStyle because Prince (then known as The Artist) requested that he be interviewed by an African-American woman. She had sent clips in to the magazine before, but they only called her at Prince's request. She also wrote a popular blog for the Huffington Post.

Kennedy published two novels. Her first novel, Bling, was published by Miramax Books in 2004 and reached 35th on the New York Times Best Seller list; the Weinstein Company optioned the book for film adaptation. Her second novel, Feminista, was published by St. Martin's Press in 2009.

== Death ==
On June 18, 2012, the Miami Beach, Florida police department confirmed to news media that Kennedy's body had been found in her home on June 13. She was 42 years old. Kennedy's cause of death has never been publicly announced.

== Published works ==
- Kennedy, Erica. Bling, Miramax Books, 2004. ISBN 978-1401352158
- Kennedy, Erica. Feminista, St. Martin's Press, 2009. ISBN 978-0312538798
