= John Hinrichs =

John F. Hinrichs (1936 – 5 June 2012) was an American welding engineer and founder of the company Friction Stir Link, Inc. in Brookfield, Wisconsin.

== Career and education ==
Hinrichs had a 40-year plus career with A.O. Smith Corporation, where he rose to director of Manufacturing Engineering at its Automotive Products Co., leading a technical staff of eighty. Projects included gas metal arc welding, energy beam processes, solid phase joining and robotics.

Hinrichs began working for A.O. Smith, a major producer of automotive frames, in 1954. He became a project engineer in the mid-1960s and began supervising the development of the robot applications for welding and other manufacturing processes in the early 1970s as manager of the Manufacturing Technology Laboratory.

Under Hinrichs's leadership AOS produced over 100 million electron beam welded tailored blanks, and installed and operated over 1,000 gas metal arc welding robots – the largest such application, worldwide, at that time. He was one of the earliest proponents of the industrial application of friction stir welding to automotive lightweight structures. He also developed procedures and specifications that were used in the manufacture of friction stir welded panels for the littoral combat ships of the US Navy.

Hinrichs received his BS degree in Mechanical Engineering from Marquette University in 1956, and his master's in metallurgical engineering from the University of Wisconsin in 1964. He held fifteen U.S. and three foreign patents related to welding processes. He spoke fluent German.

== Professional societies ==
Hinrichs was a Certified Manufacturing Engineer, a registered Professional Engineer in the State of Wisconsin and a Fellow of the American Welding Society (AWS). He was a non-executive director of the American Welding Society. He chaired two AWS committees on Safety and Health as well as Technical Papers. He was the official representative of A.O. Smith Corporation at The Welding Institute and member of the American Society of Mechanical Engineers (ASME), the Society of Manufacturing Engineers (SME) and American Society for Metals International (ASM).

== Awards ==
In 1989, Hinrichs became the first American to be presented the Golden Robot Award at the International Symposium of Industrial Robots held in Tokyo.

He was named as the first recipient of a new American Welding Society Award for Excellence in Robotic Arc Welding in 2004. He has numerous technical publications on welding and robotics.

== Family ==
He was the husband of Patricia "Patti" Hinrichs (née Illian) for nearly 52 years and father of Rob Hinrichs and Susie Weber. He died after a long struggle with idiopathic pulmonary fibrosis on 5 June 2012, at the age of 78.

== Patents ==
- U.S. Patent Number: 3,535,489: Electron Beam Welding Apparatus.
- U.S. Patent Number: 3,038,059: Welding nozzle.
- U.S. Patent Number 6,619,533: Link arms for use in suspension systems are produced through an extrusion and friction stir welding process.
- U.S. Patent Number 5,865,362: A method of welding together a motor vehicle structural assembly isavailable. The vehicle structural assembly includes a boxed member including an outboard wall
- U.S. Patent Number 5,782,401: The invention provides an automated system for welding a first metal part to a second metal part. The system includes a trainable articulated arm.
- U.S. Patent Number 5,322,208: A method for assembling a motor vehicle frame including a rail having agenerally planar outer surface and upper and lower ends, and a bracket.
