= José García Ortiz =

Mexican politician

José García Ortíz
- Born: 24 March 1949; Guadalajara, Jalisco, Mexico
- Died: 26 June 2012 (aged 63)
- Occupation: Politician
- Political party: PRI

José García Ortíz (24 March 1949 – 26 June 2012) was a Mexican politician affiliated with the Institutional Revolutionary Party. He served as Deputy of the LIX Legislature of the Mexican Congress as a plurinominal representative.
