= Pasa Tosusu =

Vanuatu civil servant

Pasa Tosusu (c. 1958 – June 15, 2012) was a Vanuatuan civil servant who served as the country's fourth Ombudsman.

Tosusu, who was from the island of Espiritu Santo, was a longtime civil servant. He spent fifteen years working as a government auditor. He then joined the ombudsman office, where he worked as an investigator for another fifteen years.

On April 23, 2010, Tosusu was appointed as Vanuatu's fourth ombudsman by Vanuatu President Iolu Johnson Abil. Tosusu was one of three candidates in the considered to replace outgoing Ombudsman Peter Taurokoto, whose contract expired at the end of April 2010. Tosusu took office for a five-year term.

Tosusu died at his home in Port Vila, Vanuatu, at the age of 54. He was honored with a state funeral held at the Malfatumauri National Council of Chiefs in Port Vila. His body was returned to his home village of Tasiriki, Espiritu Santo (Sanma Province), where he was buried on June 17, 2012.
