= D. S. Ravindra Doss =

Indian journalist

- Born: 20 November 1945
- Died: 22 June 2012 (aged 66); Chennai, Tamil Nadu, India
- Occupation(s): newspaper editor, journalist

D. S. Ravindra Doss (20 November 1945 – 22 June 2012) was a senior Indian journalist, and founder and president of the Tamil Nadu Union of Journalists. He was also Vice President of All India Journalists.

== Career ==
Although journalism was the largest part of his career, Doss was also a writer, social activist, and political critic. He wrote more than 1,000 articles in different Tamil magazines and daily newspapers. He authored more than 15 books, mainly on social issues and Indian cinema. He was the editor and publisher of the monthly Tamil magazine Tamil Thendral, which was captioned as "A Magazine by Journalists for Journalists".
