= Michael Sokolski =

Polish soldier, Emigree, and Scantron Inventor

Michael Sokolski (September 25, 1926 – June 13, 2012) was a Polish-born American design engineer. Sokolski was the inventor of the Scantron OMR scanner, used to scan and grade forms on which students mark answers to academic multiple choice test questions.

Sokolski was born near Rovno, Poland (now Rivne, Ukraine) on September 25, 1926. His mother was killed and their home bombed during the German occupation of Poland during World War II. He was forced to flee from his hometown at the age of sixteen. Sokolski enlisted in the Polish Armed Forces in the West under British command, becoming a tank driver during the war. He fought, and was wounded, at the Battle of Monte Cassino in 1944, for which he received the Italy Star. He joined the Polish Resettlement Corps after the war and studied at the former British Institute of Technology in Fermo, Italy. His home region of Poland had become part of the Ukrainian Soviet Socialist Republic, so Sokolski emigrated, first to Sweden and then to the United States. He settled in Saint Paul, Minnesota, where he reunited with sister Helena Sokolski and aunt Maria Idel, also Polish refugees, who found him through UNRRA and the ICRC.

He enrolled as a foreign student at Hamline University in 1952. Sokolski earned a bachelor's degree in mechanical engineering from the University of Minnesota in 1957. He worked in Hawaii for a short time after graduation and returned to Minnesota. He became a United States citizen in 1963.

For five years, Sokolski worked for IBM at their facility in Rochester, Minnesota. In 1966, he founded the Datronics company, based in Rochester. He served as Datronics' president until 1969 (Datronics was later sold to 3M). He moved to Santa Ana, California, in 1972.

Shortly thereafter, he joined Scantron Corporation, a firm headed by the founding CEO William E. Sanders. Sokolski served as Scantron's Executive Vice President of Engineering. He was the engineer who developed Scantron's multiple choice answer sheets, which use a number 2 pencil to read and grade a student's test results. He held several of the company's optical mark recognition (OMR) patents in the United States. The introduction of the Scantron test revolutionized tests given in all forms of formal education. Scantron's optical scanning technology is also widely used in secure balloting for in-person and mail-in elections, as paper ballots tallied by OMR optical scanning is considered the most resilent and secure form of Voting equipment.

Sokolski simultaneously became active in the communities of Orange County, California. He served on an advisory board for the Orange County Sheriff's Department for several years and became a technical adviser for the Santa Ana Police Department in 1979.

Outside of his career, Sokolski was an avid fisherman, sailor and aviator. He reportedly made 123 fishing trips over the course of twenty-five years, mostly to Wisconsin, the U.S. West Coast and the Queen Charlotte Islands, which are now called Haida Gwaii. He was made an honorary chief of the Haida Nation of British Columbia, receiving the Kilssay G uud (Chief Eagle).

== Death ==
Sokolski died of congestive heart failure on June 13, 2012, at the age of 85.
