= Edgar Ross (boxer) =

American boxer

Personal information
- Nickname: Mad Dog
- Born: July 29, 1949 Tuscaloosa, Alabama, U.S.
- Died: June 25, 2012 (aged 62) Dothan, Alabama, U.S.
- Height: 5 ft 8 in (173 cm)

Boxing career

Boxing record
- Total fights: 61
- Wins: 58
- Win by KO: 41
- Losses: 2
- Draws: 1

Edgar "Mad Dog" Ross (July 29, 1949 – June 25, 2012) was an American professional boxer who competed from 1972 and 1979. As an amateur, he won the Alabama Golden Gloves as a light heavyweight.

== Biography ==
Ross grew up in Tuscaloosa; his brother Ronnie played football for Auburn, but he was too violent for football, according to a childhood friend, and picked fights on the Tuscaloosa streets before turning to amateur boxing on the advice of Tuscaloosa County Deputy Sheriff Hayward Nixon who, himself an amateur boxer, had seen Ross beat up on people in bars and parking lots. After two fights he joined the Navy and served in Vietnam, and after his return returned to boxing, compiling a 24-4 record and winning the state's Golden Gloves competition.

He turned pro in 1972, fighting his first nine fights out of Mobile and then joining the stable of Pete Ashlock in Orlando, Florida. He suffered two losses—on points against Charlie Grimmett in 1975 and a knock-out against Tony Chiaverini in 1979, after which he retired. Before the Chiaverini fight, Ross had won the North American Boxing Federation title and was ranked second by the World Boxing Council. Chiaverini was ranked eighth, and Ross signed for $17,000; the winner would likely challenge Maurice Hope for the World Boxing Council's title. Ross lost, however, in the tenth round after having been knocked down a few times. Chiaverini, instead of challenging Ross, fought Sugar Ray Leonard and was "taken apart" in four rounds. Ross saw that fight on television and decided to retire; he announced it in a letter he sent to The Tuscaloosa News saying he wanted to quit boxing before suffering too much from head trauma. He turned down a $75,000 offer to fight Wilfred Benítez in Madison Square Garden, prompted by the aggravated symptoms of head trauma he experienced after the Chiaverini loss.

Ross turned to Christianity more and more after his career ended, but also returned to the fighting life and got beaten up in brawls. His mental and physical health deteriorated, and he was occasionally homeless and eating out of dumpsters. He suffered from seizures and short-term memory loss, always carrying a pack of cards and notes containing information about his career with him. Some three years before his death he was living with his brother Ronnie in Fairhope, Alabama, but Ronnie was diagnosed with cancer and died in late 2009. He left Edgar $20,000, and an old friend helped him get his Navy benefits and cleared some land behind his house so Edgar could live in a trailer there. He died there in 2012.
