= Shigemitsu Dandō =

Japanese legal scholar (1913–2012)

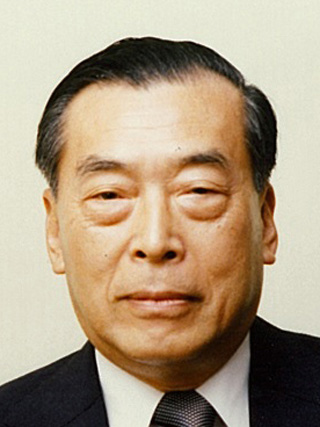
Shigemitsu Dandō

Shigemitsu Dandō (團藤 重光, Dandō Shigemitsu; 8 November 1913 – 25 June 2012) was a professor of the department of Social and Political sciences at the University of Tokyo, an academic researcher of criminology, and a Justice of the Supreme Court of Japan.

== Overviews ==
Dandō was born in Yamaguchi, and raised in Okayama Prefecture.

After graduating from the University of Tokyo Faculty of Law, he became an assistant professor at the same university at the age of 23. Under occupation after the second world war, he drafted the Code of Criminal Procedure.

Upon leaving the university, he won an appointment to the Supreme Court. In 1975 he joined the Shiratori ruling, which applied the principle of "benefit of the doubt" to appeals of criminal convictions, beginning an important trend in criminal cases leading to findings of innocence on appeal. In a 1983 decision concerning Upper House seat distribution in the Diet, he argued for the minority that "disparity in ballot weight" between constituencies was unconstitutional. For these decisions he became known as the "rebel justice."

Leaving the Court in November 1983, he became an adviser to Crown Prince Akihito. In February 1989, upon the death of Emperor Shōwa, he joined the Imperial Household Agency, providing counsel on legal and other matters.

Widely known for his lifelong opposition to capital punishment, he authored the book Shikei Haishiron ("Discussion on Abolition of the Death Penalty"), calling the death penalty the "irredeemable criminal punishment."

He was named a Person of Cultural Merit in 1986, received the Grand Cordon of the Order of the Rising Sun in 1987, and the Order of Culture in 1995.

He died of natural causes at his home in Tokyo on 25 June 2012, aged 98.
