= Luise Schottroff =

German New Testament and feminist scholar

- Born: 11 April 1934; Berlin, Germany
- Died: 8 February 2015 (aged 80); Kassel

Academic work
- Notable works: Feminist Interpretation: The Bible in Women's Perspective

Luise Schottroff (11 April 1934 – 8 February 2015) was a German New Testament and feminist scholar. She was born in Berlin, Germany, and her father was a pastor in the Confessing Church. Schottroff studied theology at the University of Mainz, and then pursued a doctorate at the University of Göttingen, completing her degree in 1960. Her dissertation was entitled, "Die Bereitung zum Sterben: Studien zu den frühen reformatorischen Sterbebüchern." She then became an assistant professor in the faculty of Evangelical theology at the University of Mainz, in 1961. She completed her habilitation at the University of Mainz in 1969. Schottroff taught at the University of Mainz until 1986, reaching full professor by 1973. She then taught at the University of Kassel from 1986 to 1999. Also in 1986, she was a co-founder of European Society of Women in Theological Research (ESWTR), formed to support women scholars. She taught at the Pacific School of Religion, in Berkeley, California, in the United States, as a visiting professor from 2001 to 2005.

Schottroff's writings have been influential in the field of biblical scholarship, offering both a feminist and social historical critique of past interpretation and biblical texts themselves. She also integrated a respectful analysis of the Jewish roots of New Testament texts, informed by her study of Jewish-Christian relations and Jewish history. One of her earliest books was Jesus of Nazareth: Hope for the Poor, co-authored with Wolfgang Stegemann, which was published in 1978. She published dozens of other books, many of which have been translated into English, including The Parables of Jesus and Lydia's Impatient Sisters: A Feminist Social History of Early Christianity. She co-authored, with Marie-Theres Wacker and Silvia Schroer, Feminist Interpretation: The Bible in Women's Perspective, which was published in 1998.

She married Willy Schottroff, an Old Testament scholar, in 1961. He died in 1997. After a long illness, Luise Schottroff died in Kassel, on February 8, 2015.

== Works ==
- with Wolfgang Stegemann, Jesus of Nazareth: Hope for the Poor (1978)
- Lydia's Impatient Sisters: A Feminist Social History of Early Christianity (1995). ISBN 978-0-664-22608-4.
- with Silvia Schroer and Marie-Theres Wacker, Feminist Interpretation: The Bible in Women's Perspective. Augsburg Fortress, 1998.
- with Dorothee Sölle, Jesus of Nazareth. Westminster John Knox Press, 2002. Translated by John Bowden.
- The Parables of Jesus (2006)
