= Jerónimo Tomás Abreu Herrera =

Jerónimo Tomás Abreu Herrera (September 30, 1930 – June 27, 2012) was the Catholic bishop of the Diocese of Mao-Monte-Cristi, Dominican Republic.

Ordained to the priesthood in 1955, Abreu Herrera was named bishop in 1978 and retired in 2006.

== See also ==
- Catholic Church in the Dominican Republic
