= Malcolm Glazzard =

English footballer (1931–2012)

Personal information
- Full name: Malcolm Glazzard
- Date of birth: 1 July 1931
- Place of birth: Eastham, England
- Date of death: 26 June 2012 (aged 80)
- Place of death: Rhode Island, United States
- Position: Forward

Youth career
- –: Liverpool

Senior career*
| Years | Team | Apps | (Gls) |
| 1949–1951 | Liverpool | 0 | (0) |
| 1951 | Accrington Stanley | 1 | (0) |
| 1951–1955 | Macclesfield Town | 133 | (103) |
- * Club domestic league appearances and goals

Malcolm Glazzard (1 July 1931 – 26 June 2012) was an English footballer who played as a forward in the Football League for Accrington Stanley.

Glazzard was born in Eastham, which was then in Cheshire. He came through the junior teams at Liverpool, without making a first-team appearance, and played for Macclesfield Town, for whom he scored more than 100 Cheshire League goals over three seasons. After completing his geography degree at the University of Manchester, Glazzard settled in the United States, where he taught, and played soccer for the Los Angeles Scots. He was married to Pat, and died at home in Rhode Island in 2015.
