= Matthias Wolfes =

German theologian

- Born: August 28, 1961; Buchholz in der Nordheide, West Germany
- Died: March 23, 2023 (aged 61); Berlin, Germany
- Education: University of Heidelberg; University of Kiel
- Theological work
- Language: German

Matthias Wolfes (August 8, 1961 – March 27, 2023) was a German Protestant theologian.

== Biography and activities ==
In 1998 he earned a PhD in systematic theology from the University of Heidelberg (Dr. theol.), Prof. Wolfgang Huber was his doctoral advisor. In 2002 he received another PhD degree (Dr. phil.) under supervision of Prof. Michael Salewski (University of Kiel). In 1999 he was ordained a minister of the Protestant Church in Berlin-Brandenburg, which is a United church (Lutheran and Reformed tradition).

Wolfes has published several substantial studies on the history of theology since the Enlightenment. His research interests focus on modern Protestant theology and ethics. His current work deals with the theory of signs, the phenomenology of religion, and the concept of a "Transforming Theology". He teaches in Berlin (Freie Universität).

== Books ==
- Protestantische Theologie und Moderne Welt. Studien zur Geschichte der Liberalen Theologie. Berlin, New York: Walter de Gruyter, 1999.
- Theologiestudium und Pfarramt. Eine kirchensoziologische Studie. Hannover: Lutherisches Verlagshaus, 2000.
- Hermann Mulert. Lebensbild eines Kieler Theologen. Neumünster: Wachholtz Verlag, 2000.
- (Edited with Michael Pietsch) Friedrich Daniel Ernst Schleiermacher: Kleine Schriften 1786 – 1833 (Kritische Gesamtausgabe Ser. I, Vol. 14). Berlin, New York: Walter de Gruyter, 2003.
- Öffentlichkeit und Bürgergesellschaft. Friedrich Schleiermachers politische Wirksamkeit (Schleiermacher-Studies. Part I, Vol. 1/2]. Berlin, New York: Walter de Gruyter, 2004. (Reviews: The Journal of Ecclesiastical History and H-Net Reviews)

== Selected essays ==
- "Theologie als Weltanschauungswissenschaft." Zeitschrift für Neuere Theologiegeschichte / Journal for the History of Modern Theology 5 (1998).
- "Frühliberale Theologie und politischer Liberalismus." Jahrbuch zur Liberalismus-Forschung 11 (1999).
- "Schuld und Verantwortung." Zeitschrift für Kirchengeschichte 111 (2000).
- "Schleiermachers Vorlesung über Dogmatische Theologie aus dem Sommersemester 1811." Schleiermacher-Archiv Vol. 19, Berlin, New York: Walter de Gruyter, 2000.
- "Public Sphere and Nation State." New Athenaeum 6 (2001).
- "Historismus und Christologie." Troeltsch-Studien. Vol. 2, Gütersloh: Gütersloher Verlagshaus, 2001.
- "Die Oeffentlichkeit des Lebens und der Staat." In Christoph Stumpf, Holger Zaborowski, eds., Church as Politeia. The Political Self-Understanding of Christianity, Berlin, New York: Walter de Gruyter, 2004.
- "Religion und symbolische Sprachform." In Klaus Tanner, ed., Religion und symbolische Kommunikation, Leipzig: Evangelische Verlagsanstalt, 2004.
- "Herders Ideal freier Religiosität." In: Martin Kessler, Volker Leppin, eds., Johann Gottfried Herder. Aspekte seines Lebenswerkes, Berlin, New York: Walter de Gruyter, 2005.
- "Schleiermacher and Judaism". New Athenaeum 8 (2007).
- "Sichtweisen." Schleiermacher-Archiv. Vol. 22, Berlin / New York: Walter de Gruyter, 2008.
- "Konstruktion der Freiheit." Forschungen zur Brandenburgischen und Preussischen Geschichte. Beihefte Vol. 11, Berlin: Duncker & Humblot, 2010.

Numerous articles on German Protestant theologians and churchmen in Neue Deutsche Biographie, The Dictionary of Historical Theology (2000), Religion in Geschichte und Gegenwart (4th Edition) / Religion Past and Present and Biographisch-Bibliographisches Kirchenlexikon (BBKL).

== Fellowships ==
- Graduate Research Fellowship: Herzog August Bibliothek Wolfenbüttel, Lower Saxony, Forschungs- und Studienstätte für europäische Kulturgeschichte, 2003-04.
- Doctoral scholarship (Ph.D. program): Friedrich Naumann Stiftung Berlin / Gummersbach, 1991-93.

Several grants.

== Memberships ==
- American Academy of Religion
- Ernst-Troeltsch-Gesellschaft
