= Leonore Siegele-Wenschkewitz =

German ecclesiastical historian (1944–1999)

Leonore Siegele-Wenschkewitz (27 June 1944, Belgard/Pommern – 17 December 1999, Frankfurt am Main) was a German church historian and director of the Evangelische Akademie Arnoldshain. She was co-editor of the journal Kirche und Israel (during 1986–1993) and of the issue Arbeiten zur kirchlichen Zeitgeschichte. She was known for her work on anti-Jewish tendencies in Christian theology.

== Works ==
- Nationalsozialismus und Kirchen. Religionspolitik von Partei und Staat bis 1935 (Tübinger Schriften zur Sozial- und Zeitgeschichte 5), Düsseldorf 1974 (bearbeitete Fassung der Dissertation: Partei, Staat und Kirchen im Dritten Reich. Materialien zur nationalsozialistischen Religionspolitik bis 1935, Tübingen 1972).
- "Wurzeln des Antisemitismus in Luthers theologischem Antijudaismus," in: Heinz Kremers (Hrsg.) in Zusammenarbeit mit Leonore Siegele-Wenschkewitz und Bertold Klappert, Die Juden und Martin Luther – Martin Luther und die Juden. Geschichte, Wirkungsgeschichte, Herausforderung, Neukirchen-Vluyn 1985, 21987, 351–367.
- "Das Verhältnis von protestantischer Theologie und Wissenschaft des Judentums während der Weimarer Republik," in: Walter Grab, Julius H. Schoeps (Hg.), Juden in der Weimarer Republik (Studien zur Geistesgeschichte 6), Stuttgart und Bonn 1986, 153–178; in English under the title: "The Relationship between Protestant Theology and Jewish Studies during the Weimar Republic," in: Otto Dov Kulka, Paul R. Mendes-Flohr (Hg.), Judaism and Christianity under the Impact of National Socialism, Jerusalem 1987, 133–150.
- Verdrängte Vergangenheit, die uns bedrängt. Feministische Theologie in der Verantwortung für die Geschichte, München 1988 (mit Aufsätzen von Jutta Flatters, Dieter Georgi, Eveline Goodman-Thau, Susannah Heschel, Katharina von Kellenbach, Luise Schottroff, Bernd und Marie-Theres Wacker; von Leonore Siegele Wenschkewitz darin der eröffnende Beitrag: Feministische Theologie ohne Antijudaismus, 12–53).
- "Protestantische Universitätstheologie und Rassenideologie in der Zeit des Nationalsozialismus. Gerhard Kittels Vortrag 'Die Entstehung des Judentums und die Entstehung der Judenfrage' von 1936," in: Günter Brakelmann, Martin Rosowski (Hg.), Antisemitismus. Von religiöser Judenfeindschaft zur Rassenideologie, Göttingen 1989, 52–75.
- with Gerda Stuchlik, ed.: Frauen und Faschismus in Europa. Der faschistische Körper (Frauen in Geschichte und Gesellschaft 6), Pfaffenweiler 1990.
- with Gerda Stuchlik, ed.: Hochschule und Nationalsozialismus. Wissenschaftsgeschichte und Wissenschaftsbetrieb als Thema der Zeitgeschichte (Arnoldshainer Texte 66), Frankfurt a. M. 1990.
- "Josel von Rosheim: Juden und Christen im Zeitalter der Reformation," in: Kirche und Israel 6, 1991, 3–16 (Habilitationsvortrag am 9. Mai 1990).
- ed., Die evangelischen Kirchen und der SED-Staat – ein Thema Kirchlicher Zeitgeschichte (Arnoldshainer Texte 77), Frankfurt a. M. 1993.
- with Carsten Nicolaisen, ed.: Theologische Fakultäten im Nationalsozialismus, Arbeiten zur Kirchlichen Zeitgeschichte B 18, Göttingen 1993.
- Christlicher Antijudaismus und Antisemitismus. Theologische und kirchliche Programme Deutscher Christen (Arnoldshainer Texte 85), Frankfurt a. M. 1994.
- "Die Rezeption und Diskussion der Genus-Kategorie in der theologischen Wissenschaft," in: Hadumod Bußmann, Renate Hof (Hrsg.), Genus. Zur Geschlechterdifferenz in den Kulturwissenschaften, Stuttgart 1995, 60–112.
- with Doron Kiesel, ed.: Der Aufklärung zum Trotz. Antisemitismus und politische Kultur in Deutschland (Arnoldshainer Texte 100), Frankfurt a. M. 1998.
