= June 25 =

June 25 this year in various calendars
- Thursday, 25 June 2026
Akan	Kuruyaw
Armenian	10 Hrotich 1475
Aztec	Tepeilhuitl 6, 11 Ocēlōtl
Babylonian	9 Simanu, 2337 SE
Balinese pawukon	Luang, Pepet, Pasah, Menala, Pon, Paniron, Wraspati of Kuningan, Uma, Urungan, Manuh
Bengali	11 Asharh, BS 1433
Chinese	Yang Metal Horse・Horn Mansion; Fire Horse Year, Month 5, Day 11 (Xiazhi, 12 days until Xiaoshu)
Common Era	25 June 2026 CE
Coptic	18 Paoni, AM 1742
Egyptian	10 Athyr, 2775 NE
Ethiopian	18 Sanē, 2018 Amätä Məhrät
French Republican	Décade I, Septidi de Messidor de l'Année 234 de la République
Gregorian	25 June, AD 2026
Hebrew	10 Tamuz, AM 5786
Hindu	Svātī・Śiva; Solar: 11 Āṣāḍha, 1948 SE; Lunisolar: Ekādaśī, Śukla pakṣa of Jyeṣṭha, 2083 VE; Rāudra・5127 KY・1,872,751
Icelandic	Fimmtudagur, 4 Sólmánuður 2026
Islamic	9 Muharram, AH 1448 (using tabular method)
ISO week date	2026-W26-4
Japanese	11 Satsuki, Reiwa 8 (Geshi, 12 days until Shōsho)
Julian	12 June, AD 2026 (AM 7534)
Julian day	2461217
Korean	11 Maldal, 4359 DE
Maya	13.0.13.12.14; 7 Tzec, 11 Ix
Roman	Pridie Idus Iunias, MMDCCLXXIX AUC
Solar Hijri	4 Tir, SH 1405
Tibetan	11 snron, me pho rta 2153 or 1772 or 1000

<<	June					>>
Su	Mo	Tu	We	Th	Fr	Sa
	1	2	3	4	5	6
7	8	9	10	11	12	13
14	15	16	17	18	19	20
21	22	23	24	25	26	27
28	29	30
2026

June 25 in recent years
2026 (Thursday)
2025 (Wednesday)
2024 (Tuesday)
2023 (Sunday)
2022 (Saturday)
2021 (Friday)
2020 (Thursday)
2019 (Tuesday)
2018 (Monday)
2017 (Sunday)

June 25 is the 176th day of the year (177th in leap years) in the Gregorian calendar; 189 days remain until the end of the year.

== Events ==
=== Pre-1600 ===
- 524 – The Franks are defeated by the Burgundians in the Battle of Vézeronce.
- 841 – In the Battle of Fontenay-en-Puisaye, forces led by Charles the Bald and Louis the German defeat the armies of Lothair I of Italy and Pepin II of Aquitaine.
- 1258 – War of Saint Sabas: In the Battle of Acre, the Venetians defeat a larger Genoese fleet sailing to relieve Acre.
- 1357 – The English defeat a French fleet which aimed to bring relief to the besieged Calais in the battle of Crotoy.
- 1401 – Schaffhausen massacre: 30 Jews are executed, following torture, after being accused of a blood libel in Schaffhausen (in present-day Switzerland).
- 1530 – At the Diet of Augsburg the Augsburg Confession is presented to the Holy Roman Emperor by the Lutheran princes and Electors of Germany.

=== 1601–1900 ===
- 1658 – Spanish forces fail to retake Jamaica at the Battle of Rio Nuevo during the Anglo-Spanish War.
- 1678 – Venetian Elena Cornaro Piscopia is the first woman awarded a doctorate of philosophy when she graduates from the University of Padua.
- 1741 – Maria Theresa is crowned Queen of Hungary.
- 1786 – Gavriil Pribylov discovers St. George Island of the Pribilof Islands in the Bering Sea.
- 1788 – Virginia becomes the tenth state to ratify the United States Constitution.
- 1848 – A photograph of the June Days uprising becomes the first known instance of photojournalism.
- 1876 – American Indian Wars: Battle of the Little Bighorn: 300 men of the U.S. 7th Cavalry Regiment under Lieutenant Colonel George Armstrong Custer are wiped out by 5,000 Lakota, Cheyenne and Arapaho, led by Sitting Bull and Crazy Horse.
- 1900 – The Taoist monk Wang Yuanlu discovers the Dunhuang manuscripts, a cache of ancient texts that are of great historical and religious significance, in the Mogao Caves of Dunhuang, China.

=== 1901–present ===
- 1906 – Pittsburgh, Pennsylvania millionaire Harry Thaw shoots and kills prominent architect Stanford White.
- 1910 – The United States Congress passes the Mann Act, which prohibits interstate transport of women or girls for "immoral purposes"; the ambiguous language would be used to selectively prosecute people for years to come.
- 1910 – Igor Stravinsky's ballet The Firebird is premiered in Paris, bringing him to prominence as a composer.
- 1913 – American Civil War veterans begin arriving at the Great Reunion of 1913.
- 1935 – Colombia–Soviet Union relations are established.
- 1938 – Dr. Douglas Hyde is inaugurated as the first President of Ireland.
- 1940 – World War II: The French armistice with Nazi Germany comes into effect.
- 1941 – World War II: The Continuation War between the Soviet Union and Finland, supported by Nazi Germany, began.
- 1943 – The Holocaust and World War II: Jews in the Częstochowa Ghetto in Poland stage an uprising against the Nazis.
- 1943 – The left-wing German Jewish exile Arthur Goldstein is murdered in Auschwitz.
- 1944 – World War II: The Battle of Tali-Ihantala, the largest battle ever fought in the Nordic countries, begins.
- 1944 – World War II: United States Navy and British Royal Navy ships bombard Cherbourg to support United States Army units engaged in the Battle of Cherbourg.
- 1944 – The final page of the comic Krazy Kat is published, exactly two months after its author George Herriman died.
- 1947 – The Diary of a Young Girl (better known as The Diary of Anne Frank) is published.
- 1948 – The United States Congress passes the Displaced Persons Act to allow World War II refugees to immigrate to the United States above quota restrictions.
- 1950 – The Korean War begins with the invasion of South Korea by North Korea.
- 1960 – Cold War: Two cryptographers working for the United States National Security Agency left for vacation to Mexico, and from there defected to the Soviet Union.
- 1975 – Mozambique achieves independence from Portugal.
- 1975 – Prime Minister Indira Gandhi declares a state of internal emergency in India.
- 1976 – Missouri Governor Kit Bond issues an executive order rescinding the Extermination Order, formally apologizing on behalf of the state of Missouri for the suffering it had caused to members of the Church of Jesus Christ of Latter-day Saints.
- 1978 – The rainbow flag representing gay pride is flown for the first time during the San Francisco Gay Freedom Day Parade.
- 1978 – Hosts Argentina defeat the Netherlands by a score of 3–1 in the final to win their first ever FIFA World Cup.
- 1981 – Microsoft is restructured to become an incorporated business in its home state of Washington.
- 1991 – The breakup of Yugoslavia begins when Slovenia and Croatia declare their independence from Yugoslavia.
- 1992 – Space Shuttle Columbia launches on STS-50, the first shuttle mission to carry Extended Duration Orbiter hardware.
- 1993 – Kim Campbell is sworn in as the first female Prime Minister of Canada.
- 1996 – The Khobar Towers bombing in Saudi Arabia kills 19 U.S. servicemen.
- 1996 – American rapper Jay-Z releases his debut album, Reasonable Doubt.
- 1997 – An uncrewed Progress spacecraft collides with the Russian space station Mir.
- 1997 – The National Hockey League approved expansion franchises for Nashville (1998), Atlanta (1999), Columbus (2000), and Minneapolis-Saint Paul (2000).
- 1998 – In Clinton v. City of New York, the United States Supreme Court decides that the Line Item Veto Act of 1996 is unconstitutional.
- 2007 – PMTair Flight 241 crashes in the Dâmrei Mountains in Kampot Province, Cambodia, killing all 22 people on board.
- 2009 – The death of American entertainer Michael Jackson triggers an outpouring of worldwide grief as reactions online cause the flow of internet traffic to surge to unprecedented and historic levels.
- 2022 – The prime minister of Bangladesh, Sheikh Hasina inaugurates the longest bridge of Bangladesh, Padma Bridge.
- 2022 – Russo-Ukrainian War: The Battle of Sievierodonetsk ends after weeks of heavy fighting with the Russian capture of the city, leading to the Battle of Lysychansk.
- 2022 – Two people are killed and 21 more injured after a gunman opens fire at three sites in Oslo in a suspected Islamist anti-LGBTQ+ attack.
- 2024 – Thousands of people storm Kenya's Parliament Buildings protesting the passing of the government's 2024/25 Finance Bill.

== Births ==
=== Pre-1600 ===
- 1242 – Beatrice of England (died 1275)
- 1328 – William de Montagu, 2nd Earl of Salisbury, English commander (died 1397)
- 1371 – Joanna II of Naples (died 1435)
- 1484 – Bartholomeus V. Welser, German banker (died 1561)
- 1526 – Elisabeth Parr, Marchioness of Northampton (died 1565)
- 1560 – Wilhelm Fabry, German surgeon (died 1634)
- 1568 – Gunilla Bielke, Queen of Sweden (died 1597)

=== 1601–1900 ===
- 1612 – John Albert Vasa, Polish cardinal (died 1634)
- 1632 – Girolamo Corner, Venetian statesman and military commander (died 1690)
- 1709 – Francesco Araja, Italian composer (died 1762)
- 1715 – Joseph Foullon de Doué, French soldier and politician, Controller-General of Finances (died 1789)
- 1755 – Natalia Alexeievna of Russia (died 1776)
- 1799 – David Douglas, Scottish-English botanist and explorer (died 1834)
- 1814 – Gabriel Auguste Daubrée, French geologist and engineer (died 1896)
- 1825 – James Farnell, Australian politician, 8th Premier of New South Wales (died 1888)
- 1848 – Thomas Henry Tracy, Canadian architect and alderman (died 1925)
- 1852 – Antoni Gaudí, Spanish architect, designed the Park Güell and the Sagrada Família (died 1926)
- 1858 – Georges Courteline, French author and playwright (died 1929)
- 1860 – Gustave Charpentier, French composer and conductor (died 1956)
- 1863 – Émile Francqui, Belgian soldier and diplomat (died 1935)
- 1864 – Walther Nernst, German chemist and physicist, Nobel Prize laureate (died 1941)
- 1866 – Eloísa Díaz, Chilean doctor and Chile's first female physician (died 1950)
- 1874 – Rose O'Neill, American cartoonist, illustrator, artist, and writer (died 1944)
- 1884 – Géza Gyóni, Hungarian soldier and poet (died 1917)
- 1884 – Daniel-Henry Kahnweiler, German-French art collector and historian (died 1979)
- 1886 – Henry H. Arnold, American general (died 1950)
- 1887 – George Abbott, American director, producer, and screenwriter (died 1995)
- 1887 – Frigyes Karinthy, Hungarian author, poet, and journalist (died 1938)
- 1892 – Shirō Ishii, Japanese microbiologist and general (died 1959)
- 1894 – Hermann Oberth, Romanian-German physicist and engineer (died 1989)
- 1898 – Kay Sage, American painter and poet (died 1963)
- 1900 – Marta Abba, Italian actress (died 1988)
- 1900 – Zinaida Aksentyeva, Ukrainian/Soviet astronomer (died 1969)
- 1900 – Georgia Hale, American silent film actress and real estate investor (died 1985)
- 1900 – Louis Mountbatten, 1st Earl Mountbatten of Burma, English admiral and politician, 44th Governor-General of India (died 1979)

=== 1901–present ===
- 1901 – Harold Roe Bartle, American businessman and politician, 47th Mayor of Kansas City (died 1974)
- 1902 – Yasuhito, Prince Chichibu of Japan (died 1953)
- 1903 – George Orwell, British novelist, essayist, and critic (died 1950)
- 1903 – Anne Revere, American actress (died 1990)
- 1905 – Rupert Wildt, German-American astronomer and academic (died 1976)
- 1907 – J. Hans D. Jensen, German physicist and academic, Nobel Prize laureate (died 1973)
- 1908 – Willard Van Orman Quine, American philosopher and academic (died 2000)
- 1911 – William Howard Stein, American chemist and biologist, Nobel Prize laureate (died 1980)
- 1912 – William T. Cahill, American lawyer and politician, 46th Governor of New Jersey (died 1996)
- 1913 – Cyril Fletcher, English actor and screenwriter (died 2005)
- 1917 – Nils Karlsson, Swedish skier (died 2012)
- 1917 – Claude Seignolle, French author (died 2018)
- 1918 – P. H. Newby, English soldier and author (died 1997)
- 1920 – Lassie Lou Ahern, American actress (died 2018)
- 1921 – Celia Franca, English-Canadian ballerina and choreographer, founded the National Ballet of Canada (died 2007)
- 1922 – Johnny Smith, American guitarist and songwriter (died 2013)
- 1923 – Sam Francis, American soldier and painter (died 1994)
- 1923 – Dorothy Gilman, American author (died 2012)
- 1923 – Jamshid Amouzegar, 43rd Prime Minister of Iran (died 2016)
- 1924 – Sidney Lumet, American director, producer, and screenwriter (died 2011)
- 1924 – Dimitar Isakov, Bulgarian footballer
- 1924 – Madan Mohan, Iraqi-Indian composer and director (died 1975)
- 1924 – Rosalind P. Walter, American philanthropist, WNET benefactor and an inspiration behind "Rosie the Riveter" (died 2020)
- 1925 – Clifton Chenier, American blues singer, the 'King of Zydeco' (died 1978)
- 1925 – June Lockhart, American actress (died 2025)
- 1925 – Virginia Patton, American actress and businesswoman (died 2022)
- 1925 – Robert Venturi, American architect and academic (died 2018)
- 1926 – Ingeborg Bachmann, Austrian author and poet (died 1973)
- 1926 – Kep Enderby, Australian lawyer, judge, and politician, 23rd Attorney-General for Australia (died 2015)
- 1926 – Stig Sollander, Swedish Alpine skier (died 2019)
- 1927 – Antal Róka, Hungarian runner (died 1970)
- 1927 – Arnold Wolfendale, English astronomer and academic (died 2020)
- 1928 – Alexei Alexeyevich Abrikosov, Russian-American physicist and academic, Nobel Prize laureate (died 2017)
- 1928 – Michel Brault, Canadian director, producer, and screenwriter (died 2013)
- 1928 – Peyo, Belgian author and illustrator, created The Smurfs (died 1992)
- 1928 – William Russo, American trombonist, jazz, classical and theater composer (died 2003)
- 1929 – Eric Carle, American author and illustrator (died 2021)
- 1929 – Francesco Marchisano, Italian cardinal (died 2014)
- 1931 – V. P. Singh, Indian lawyer and politician, 7th Prime Minister of India (died 2008)
- 1932 – Peter Blake, English painter and illustrator
- 1932 – George Sluizer, French-Dutch director, producer, and screenwriter (died 2014)
- 1933 – Álvaro Siza Vieira, Portuguese architect, designed the Porto School of Architecture
- 1933 – James Meredith, civil rights activist, first black man to graduate from the University of Mississippi
- 1934 – Jean Geissinger, American baseball player (died 2014)
- 1934 – Jack W. Hayford, American minister and author (died 2023)
- 1934 – Beatriz Sheridan, Mexican actress and director (died 2006)
- 1935 – Salihu Ibrahim, Nigerian Army Officer (died 2018)
- 1935 – Taufiq Ismail, Indonesian poet and activist
- 1935 – Larry Kramer, American author, playwright, and activist, co-founded Gay Men's Health Crisis (died 2020)
- 1935 – Judy Howe, American artistic gymnast
- 1935 – Charles Sheffield, English-American mathematician, physicist, and author (died 2002)
- 1936 – B. J. Habibie, Indonesian engineer and politician, 3rd President of Indonesia (died 2019)
- 1936 – Bert Hölldobler, German biologist and entomologist
- 1937 – Eddie Floyd, American R&B/soul singer-songwriter
- 1937 – Doreen Wells, English ballerina and actress
- 1939 – Allen Fox, American tennis player and coach
- 1939 – Harold Melvin, American soul and R&B singer(died 1997)
- 1940 – Judy Amoore, Australian runner
- 1940 – Mary Beth Peil, American actress and singer
- 1940 – A. J. Quinnell, English-Maltese author (died 2005)
- 1941 – Denys Arcand, Canadian director, producer, and screenwriter
- 1941 – John Albert Raven, Scottish academic and ecologist (died 2024)
- 1942 – Patricia Brake, English actress (died 2022)
- 1942 – Nikiforos Diamandouros, Greek academic and politician
- 1942 – Willis Reed, American basketball player, coach, and manager (died 2023)
- 1942 – Michel Tremblay, Canadian author and playwright
- 1943 – Carly Simon, American singer-songwriter
- 1944 – Robert Charlebois, Canadian singer-songwriter, guitarist, and actor
- 1944 – Gary David Goldberg, American screenwriter and producer (died 2013)
- 1945 – Baba Gana Kingibe, Nigerian politician
- 1945 – Harry Womack, American singer (died 1974)
- 1946 – Roméo Dallaire, Dutch-Canadian general and politician
- 1946 – Allen Lanier, American guitarist and songwriter (died 2013)
- 1946 – Ian McDonald, English guitarist and saxophonist (died 2022)
- 1947 – John Powell, American discus thrower (died 2022)
- 1947 – Jimmie Walker, American actor
- 1947 – Paul-André Cadieux, Canadian ice hockey player (died 2024)
- 1949 – Richard Clarke, Irish archbishop
- 1949 – Phyllis George, American beauty queen, sportscaster, and First Lady of Kentucky (died 2020)
- 1949 – Patrick Tambay, French racing driver (died 2022)
- 1949 – Yoon Joo-sang, South Korean actor
- 1950 – Marcello Toninelli, Italian author and screenwriter
- 1951 – Eva Bayer-Fluckiger, Swiss mathematician and academic
- 1952 – Péter Erdő, Hungarian cardinal
- 1952 – Tim Finn, New Zealand singer-songwriter
- 1952 – Martin Gerschwitz, German singer-songwriter and keyboard player
- 1952 – Kristina Abelli Elander, Swedish artist
- 1953 – Olivier Ameisen, French-American cardiologist and educator (died 2013)
- 1953 – Ian Davis, Australian cricketer
- 1954 – Mario Lessard, Canadian ice hockey player
- 1954 – David Paich, American singer-songwriter, keyboard player, and producer
- 1954 – Sonia Sotomayor, American lawyer and jurist, Associate Justice of the Supreme Court of the United States
- 1955 – Vic Marks, English cricketer and sportscaster
- 1956 – Anthony Bourdain, American chef and author (died 2018)
- 1956 – Boris Trajkovski, Macedonian politician, 2nd President of the Republic of Macedonia (died 2004)
- 1956 – Craig Young, Australian rugby player and coach
- 1957 – Greg Millen, Canadian ice hockey player and sportscaster (died 2025)
- 1958 – William Basinski, American musician and composer
- 1959 – Lutz Dombrowski, German long jumper and educator
- 1959 – Jari Puikkonen, Finnish ski jumper
- 1959 – Bobbie Vaile, Australian astrophysicist and astronomer (died 1996)
- 1960 – Alastair Bruce of Crionaich, English-Scottish journalist and author
- 1960 – Craig Johnston, South African-Australian footballer and photographer
- 1960 – Laurent Rodriguez, French rugby player
- 1961 – Timur Bekmambetov, Kazakh director, producer, and screenwriter
- 1961 – Ricky Gervais, English comedian, actor, director, producer and singer
- 1963 – Yann Martel, Spanish-born Canadian author
- 1963 – Doug Gilmour, Canadian ice hockey player and manager
- 1963 – George Michael, English singer-songwriter and producer (died 2016)
- 1964 – Phil Emery, Australian cricketer
- 1964 – Johnny Herbert, English racing driver and sportscaster
- 1964 – John McCrea, American singer-songwriter and musician
- 1965 – Napole Polutele, French politician
- 1965 – Kerri Pottharst, Australian beach volleyball player
- 1966 – Dikembe Mutombo, Congolese-American basketball player (died 2024)
- 1967 – Tracey Spicer, Australian journalist
- 1968 – Adrian Garvey, Zimbabwean-South African rugby player
- 1968 – Vaios Karagiannis, Greek footballer and manager
- 1969 – Kevin Kelley, American football coach
- 1970 – Roope Latvala, Finnish guitarist
- 1970 – Erki Nool, Estonian decathlete and politician
- 1971 – Karen Darke, English cyclist and author
- 1971 – Jason Gallian, Australian-English cricketer and educator
- 1971 – Rod Kafer, Australian rugby player and sportscaster
- 1971 – Angela Kinsey, American actress
- 1971 – Neil Lennon, Northern Irish-Scottish footballer and manager
- 1971 – Michael Tucker, American baseball player
- 1972 – Carlos Delgado, Puerto Rican baseball player and coach
- 1972 – Saif al-Islam Gaddafi, Libyan engineer and politician (died 2026)
- 1973 – Milan Hnilička, Czech ice hockey player
- 1973 – Jamie Redknapp, English footballer and coach
- 1974 – Nisha Ganatra, Canadian director, producer, and screenwriter
- 1974 – Glen Metropolit, Canadian ice hockey player
- 1975 – Kiur Aarma, Estonian journalist and producer
- 1975 – Linda Cardellini, American actress
- 1975 – Albert Costa, Spanish tennis player and coach
- 1975 – Vladimir Kramnik, Russian chess player
- 1975 – Michele Merkin, American model and television host
- 1976 – José Cancela, Uruguayan footballer
- 1976 – Carlos Nieto, Argentinian-Italian rugby player
- 1976 – Neil Walker, American swimmer
- 1978 – Aramis Ramírez, Dominican baseball player
- 1979 – Richard Hughes, Scottish footballer
- 1979 – Busy Philipps, American actress
- 1981 – Simon Ammann, Swiss ski jumper
- 1982 – Rain, South Korean singer and actor
- 1982 – Mikhail Youzhny, Russian tennis player
- 1983 – Marc Janko, Austrian footballer
- 1985 – Karim Matmour, Algerian footballer
- 1986 – Aya Matsuura, Japanese singer and actress
- 1988 – Jhonas Enroth, Swedish ice hockey player
- 1988 – Miguel Layún, Mexican footballer
- 1988 – Therese Johaug, Norwegian cross-country skier
- 1990 – Andi Eigenmann, Filipino actress
- 1996 – Pietro Fittipaldi, Brazilian-American race car driver
- 1998 – Kyle Chalmers, Australian swimmer
- 2001 – Philip Broberg, Swedish professional ice hockey player
- 2002 – Benson Boone, American singer-songwriter
- 2005 – Kylie Cantrall, American actress, singer, songwriter, dancer, and social media personality
- 2006 – Mckenna Grace, American actress, singer and songwriter

== Deaths ==
=== Pre-1600 ===
- 635 – Gao Zu, Chinese emperor (born 566)
- 841 – Gerard of Auvergne, Frankish nobleman
- 841 – Ricwin of Nantes, Frankish nobleman
- 891 – Sunderolt, German archbishop
- 931 – An Chonghui, Chinese general
- 1014 – Æthelstan Ætheling, son of Æthelred the Unready
- 1031 – Sheng Zong, Chinese emperor (born 972)
- 1134 – Niels, king of Denmark (born 1065)
- 1218 – Simon de Montfort, 5th Earl of Leicester, French politician, Lord High Steward (born 1160)
- 1291 – Eleanor of Provence, queen of England (born 1223)
- 1337 – Frederick III, king of Sicily (born 1272)
- 1394 – Dorothea of Montau, German hermitess (born 1347)
- 1483 – Anthony Woodville, 2nd Earl Rivers, English courtier and translator (born 1440)
- 1483 – Richard Grey, half brother of Edward V of England (born 1458)
- 1522 – Franchinus Gaffurius, Italian composer and theorist (born 1451)
- 1533 – Mary Tudor, queen of France (born 1496)
- 1579 – Hatano Hideharu, Japanese warlord (born 1541)
- 1593 – Michele Mercati, Italian physician and archaeologist (born 1541)

=== 1601–1900 ===
- 1634 – John Marston, English poet and playwright (born 1576)
- 1638 – Juan Pérez de Montalbán, Spanish author, poet, and playwright (born 1602)
- 1665 – Sigismund Francis, archduke of Austria (born 1630)
- 1669 – François de Vendôme, duke of Beaufort (born 1616)
- 1671 – Giovanni Battista Riccioli, Italian priest and astronomer (born 1598)
- 1673 – Charles de Batz-Castelmore d'Artagnan, French captain (born 1611)
- 1686 – Simon Ushakov, Russian painter and educator (born 1626)
- 1715 – Jean-Baptiste du Casse, French admiral and politician (born 1646)
- 1767 – Georg Philipp Telemann, German composer and theorist (born 1681)
- 1798 – Thomas Sandby, English cartographer, painter, and architect (born 1721)
- 1822 – E. T. A. Hoffmann, German composer, critic, and jurist (born 1776)
- 1835 – Ebenezer Pemberton, American educator (born 1746)
- 1838 – François-Nicolas-Benoît Haxo, French general and engineer (born 1774)
- 1861 – Abdülmecid I, Ottoman sultan (born 1823)
- 1866 – Alexander von Nordmann, Finnish biologist and paleontologist (born 1803)
- 1868 – Carlo Matteucci, Italian physicist and neurophysiologist (born 1811)
- 1870 – David Heaton, American lawyer and politician (born 1823)
- 1875 – Antoine-Louis Barye, French sculptor (born 1796)
- 1876 – James Calhoun, American lieutenant (born 1845)
- 1876 – Boston Custer, American civilian army contractor (born 1848)
- 1876 – George Armstrong Custer, American general (born 1839)
- 1876 – Thomas Custer, American officer, Medal of Honor recipient (born 1845)
- 1876 – Myles Keogh, Irish-American officer (born 1840)
- 1882 – François Jouffroy, French sculptor (born 1806)
- 1884 – Hans Rott, Austrian organist and composer (born 1858)
- 1886 – Jean-Louis Beaudry, Canadian businessman and politician, 11th Mayor of Montreal (born 1809)
- 1894 – Sadi Carnot, French engineer and politician, 5th President of France (born 1837)

=== 1901–present ===
- 1906 – Stanford White, American architect, designed the Washington Square Arch (born 1853)
- 1912 – Lawrence Alma-Tadema, Dutch-British painter (born 1836)
- 1916 – Thomas Eakins, American painter, photographer, and sculptor (born 1844)
- 1917 – Géza Gyóni, Hungarian soldier and poet (born 1884)
- 1918 – Jake Beckley, American baseball player and coach (born 1867)
- 1922 – Satyendranath Dutta, Indian poet and author (born 1882)
- 1937 – Colin Clive, British actor (born 1900)
- 1939 – Richard Seaman, English race car driver (born 1913)
- 1943 – Arthur Goldstein, German Jewish left-wing activist (c. 1887)
- 1944 – Dénes Berinkey, Hungarian jurist and politician, 18th Prime Minister of Hungary (born 1871)
- 1944 – Lucha Reyes, Mexican singer and actress (born 1906)
- 1947 – Jimmy Doyle, American boxer (born 1924)
- 1948 – William C. Lee, American general (born 1895)
- 1949 – Buck Freeman, American baseball player (born 1871)
- 1949 – James Steen, American water polo player (born 1876)
- 1950 – Muiris Ó Súilleabháin, Irish police officer and author (born 1904)
- 1958 – Alfred Noyes, English author, poet, and playwright (born 1880)
- 1959 – Charles Starkweather, American spree killer (born 1938)
- 1960 – Tommy Corcoran, American baseball player and manager (born 1869)
- 1968 – Tony Hancock, English comedian and actor (born 1924)
- 1971 – John Boyd Orr, 1st Baron Boyd-Orr, Scottish physician, biologist, and politician, Nobel Prize laureate (born 1880)
- 1972 – Jan Matulka, Czech-American painter and illustrator (born 1890)
- 1974 – Cornelius Lanczos, Hungarian mathematician and physicist (born 1893)
- 1976 – Johnny Mercer, American singer-songwriter, co-founded Capitol Records (born 1909)
- 1977 – Olave Baden-Powell, British Girl Guiding and Girl Scouting leader (born 1889)
- 1977 – Endre Szervánszky, Hungarian pianist and composer (born 1911)
- 1979 – Dave Fleischer, American animator, director, and producer (born 1894)
- 1979 – Philippe Halsman, Latvian-American photographer (born 1906)
- 1981 – Felipe Cossío del Pomar, Peruvian painter and political activist (born 1888)
- 1983 – Alberto Ginastera, Argentinian pianist and composer (born 1916)
- 1984 – Michel Foucault, French historian and philosopher (born 1926)
- 1988 – Hillel Slovak, Israeli-American guitarist and songwriter (born 1962)
- 1990 – Ronald Gene Simmons, American sergeant and murderer (born 1940)
- 1992 – Jerome Brown, American football player (born 1965)
- 1995 – Warren E. Burger, Fifteenth Chief Justice of the Supreme Court of the United States (born 1907)
- 1995 – Ernest Walton, Irish physicist and academic, Nobel Prize laureate (born 1903)
- 1996 – Arthur Snelling, English civil servant and diplomat, British Ambassador to South Africa (born 1914)
- 1997 – Jacques Cousteau, French oceanographer and explorer (born 1910)
- 1999 – Fred Trump, American real estate developer and businessman (born 1905)
- 2002 – Jean Corbeil, Canadian politician, 29th Canadian Minister of Labour (born 1934)
- 2003 – Lester Maddox, American businessman and politician, 75th Governor of Georgia (born 1915)
- 2004 – Morton Coutts, New Zealand inventor (born 1904)
- 2005 – John Fiedler, American actor and voice artist (born 1925)
- 2005 – Kâzım Koyuncu, Turkish singer-songwriter and activist (born 1971)
- 2006 – Jaap Penraat, Dutch-American humanitarian (born 1918)
- 2007 – J. Fred Duckett, American journalist and educator (born 1933)
- 2007 – Jeeva, Indian director, cinematographer, and screenwriter (born 1963)
- 2008 – Lyall Watson, South African anthropologist and ethologist (born 1939)
- 2009 – Farrah Fawcett, American actress and producer (born 1947)
- 2009 – Michael Jackson, American singer-songwriter, producer, dancer, and actor (born 1958)
- 2009 – Sky Saxon, American singer-songwriter (born 1937)
- 2010 – Alan Plater, English playwright and screenwriter (born 1935)
- 2010 – Richard B. Sellars, American businessman and philanthropist (born 1915)
- 2011 – Annie Easley, American computer scientist and mathematician (born 1933)
- 2011 – Goff Richards, English composer and conductor (born 1944)
- 2011 – Margaret Tyzack, English actress (born 1931)
- 2012 – Shigemitsu Dandō, Japanese academic and jurist (born 1913)
- 2012 – Campbell Gillies, Scottish jockey (born 1990)
- 2012 – George Randolph Hearst, Jr., American businessman (born 1927)
- 2012 – Lucella MacLean, American baseball player (born 1921)
- 2012 – Edgar Ross, American boxer (born 1949)
- 2013 – George Burditt, American screenwriter and producer (born 1923)
- 2013 – Catherine Gibson, Scottish swimmer (born 1931)
- 2013 – Robert E. Gilka, American photographer and journalist (born 1916)
- 2013 – Harry Parker, American rower and coach (born 1935)
- 2013 – Mildred Ladner Thompson, American journalist (born 1918)
- 2013 – Green Wix Unthank, American soldier and judge (born 1923)
- 2014 – Nigel Calder, English journalist, author, and screenwriter (born 1931)
- 2014 – Ana María Matute, Spanish author and academic (born 1925)
- 2014 – Ivan Plyushch, Ukrainian agronomist and politician (born 1941)
- 2015 – Patrick Macnee, English actor (born 1922)
- 2015 – Nerses Bedros XIX Tarmouni, Egyptian-Armenian patriarch (born 1940)
- 2016 – Adam Small, South African writer of apartheid-period (born 1936)
- 2019 – Eurig Wyn, Welsh politician (born 1944)
- 2023 – Simon Crean, Australian trade union leader and politician (born 1949)
- 2024 – Sika Anoa‘i, American Samoan professional wrestler (born 1945)
- 2024 – Bill Cobbs, American actor (born 1934)

== Holidays and observances ==
- Arbor Day (Philippines)
- Christian feast day:
  - David of Munktorp
  - Dorothea of Montau
  - Eurosia
  - Maximus (Massimo) of Turin
  - Moluag
  - Our Lady of Medjugorje
  - Philipp Melanchthon (Evangelical Lutheran Church in America)
  - Presentation of the Augsburg Confession (Lutheran)
  - Prosper of Aquitaine
  - Prosper of Reggio
  - William of Montevergine
  - June 25 (Eastern Orthodox liturgics)
- Independence Day, celebrates the independence of Mozambique from Portugal in 1975.
- Independence Day (Croatia)
- National Catfish Day (United States)
- Statehood Day (Slovenia)
- Statehood Day (Virginia)
- Teacher's Day (Guatemala)
- World Vitiligo Day
