= Louis I, Grand Duke of Hesse =

Louis I
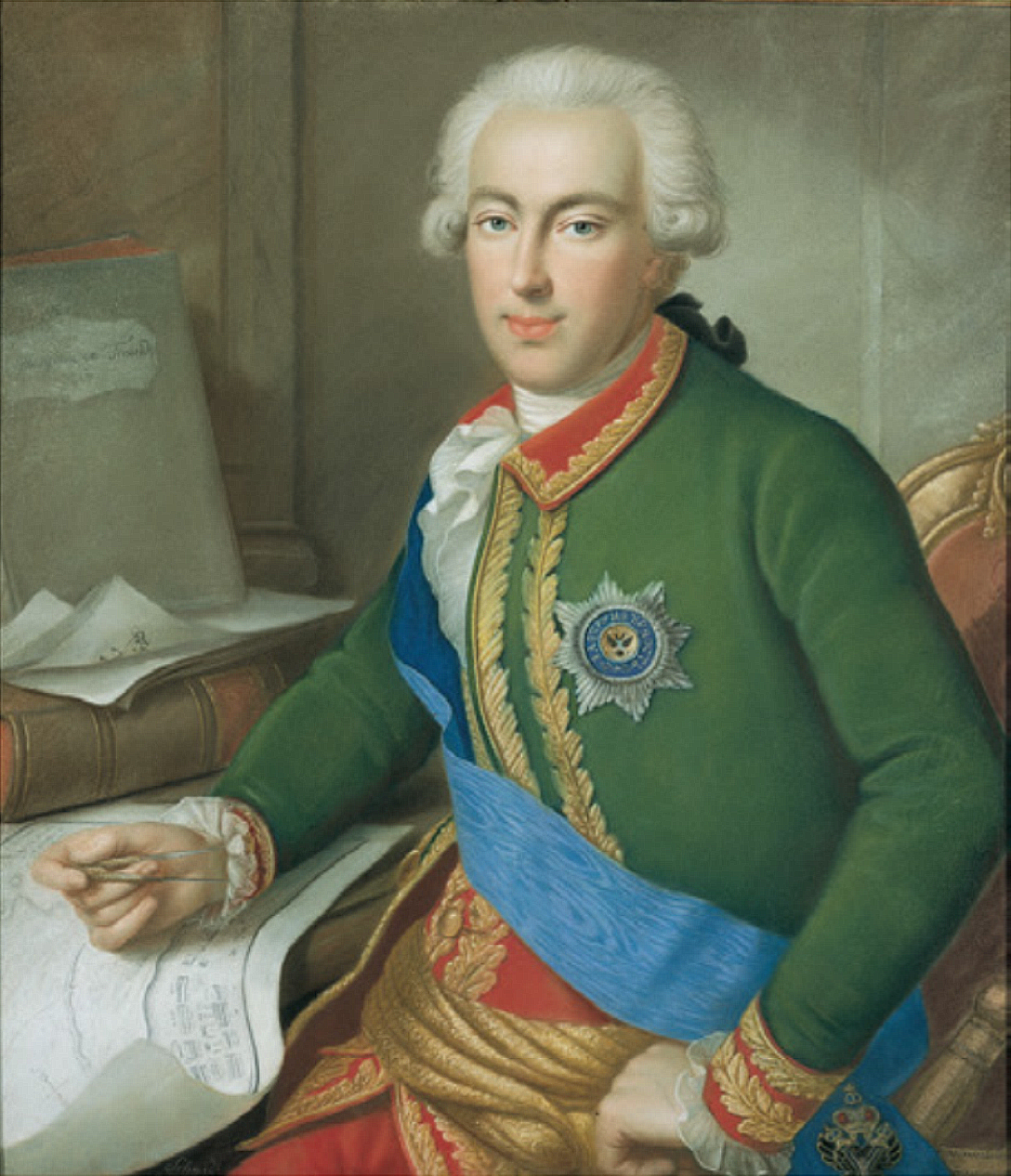
- 1783 portrait

Grand Duke of Hesse and by Rhine
- Reign: 14 August 1806 – 6 April 1830
- Successor: Louis II

Landgrave of Hesse-Darmstadt As Louis X
- Reign: 6 April 1790 – 14 August 1806
- Predecessor: Louis IX
- Born: 14 June 1753; Prenzlau, Brandenburg
- Died: 6 April 1830 (aged 76); Darmstadt, Hesse
- Spouse: Princess Louise of Hesse-Darmstadt (m. 1777; died 1829)
- Issue: Grand Duke Louis II; Princess Louise; Prince George; Prince Frederick; Prince Emil; Prince Gustav
- House: Hesse-Darmstadt
- Father: Louis IX, Landgrave of Hesse-Darmstadt
- Mother: Countess Palatine Caroline of Zweibrücken

Louis I, Grand Duke of Hesse (14 June 1753 – 6 April 1830) was Landgrave of Hesse-Darmstadt (as Louis X) and later the first Grand Duke of Hesse and by Rhine.

Louis was the son of Louis IX, Landgrave of Hesse-Darmstadt, and succeeded his father in 1790. He presided over a significant increase in territory for Hesse-Darmstadt during the imperial reorganizations of 1801–1803, most notably the Duchy of Westphalia, hitherto subject to the Archbishop of Cologne. Allied to Napoleon I of France, Louis in 1806 was elevated to the title of a Grand Duke of Hesse and joined the Confederation of the Rhine, leading to the dissolution of the Empire. At the Congress of Vienna in 1814/15, Louis had to give up his Westphalian territories, but was compensated with the district of Rheinhessen on the left bank of the Rhine. Because of this addition, he amended his title to Grand Duke of Hesse and by Rhine.

== Early life ==
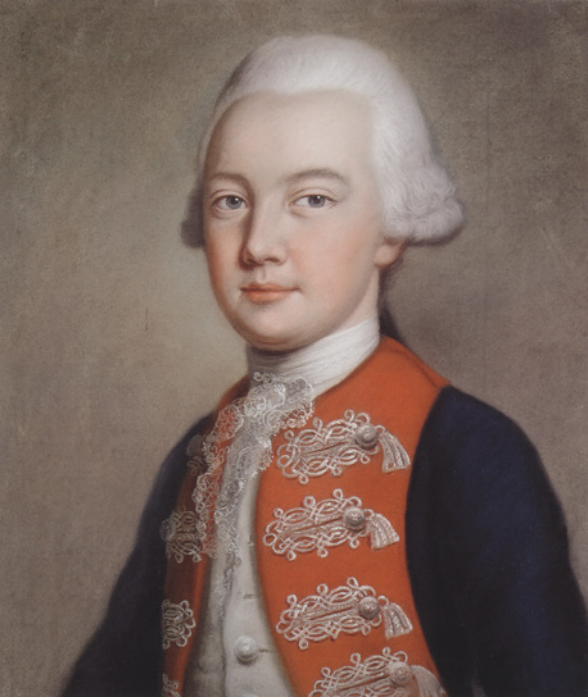
Louis as hereditary prince of Hesse-Darmstadt (1769)

Louis was born on 14 June 1753 as the third child and eldest son of the later Landgrave Louis IX of Hessen-Darmstadt, and his spouse Countess Palatine Caroline of Zweibrücken, a daughter of Christian III, Count Palatine of Zweibrücken. He was born in the town of Prenzlau in Brandenburg, where his father, who was in Prussian military service, was stationed. The children grew up with the mother in the town of Buchsweiler, which had previously been the residence of the Counts of Hanau-Lichtenberg, while the father stayed mainly in the town of Pirmasens to attend his military career. In 1766, when Louis was 13, his mother's court moved from Buchsweiler to Darmstadt. At the death of his grandfather on 17 October 1768, his father succeeded as landgrave, and Louis himself became heir to the landgraviate with the title of hereditary prince.

Ludwig studied at the University of Leiden from 1769 and subsequently undertook his Grand Tour to London and Paris. In France he met, among others, the French philosophers Jean le Rond d'Alembert and Denis Diderot, who were some of the prominent figures of the Age of Enlightenment, and editors of the first modern encyclopedia. In 1773 he traveled with the German-born French writer and critic Friedrich Melchior Grimm to the court of Frederik the Great in Prussia, where his sister Frederica Louisa was married to the heir presumptive Frederick William. Finally, he traveled on to Russia, where in 1773 he attended the wedding of his second sister Wilhelmina Louisa in St. Petersburg to the heir to the Russian throne, Grand Duke Paul. As a Russian general Ludwig fought in 1774 in the Russo-Turkish War, and the same year he became freemason in the lodge "To the crowned flag "in Moscow.

== Marriage ==
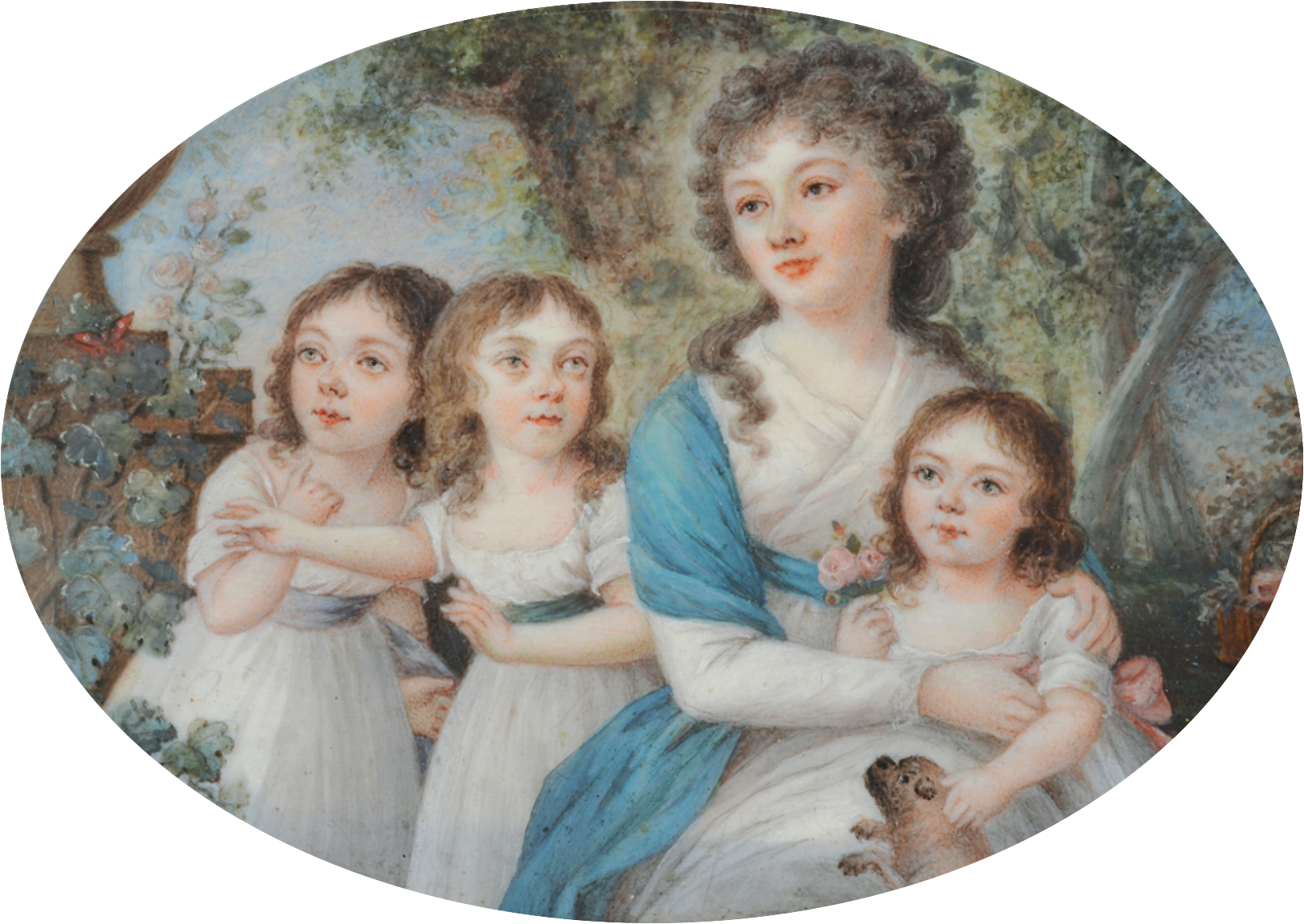
Landgravinde Louise with her three eldest children, c. 1792

In 1776, he became engaged to Sophie Dorothea of Württemberg, eldest daughter of Frederick II Eugene, Duke of Württemberg. The engagement was broken off so that Sophia Dorothea could marry Louis's recently widowed brother-in-law Tsarevich Paul Petrovich, son and heir of Catherine II "the Great", Empress of Russia. He received a monetary compensation when the engagement was broken.

After this humiliating incident, Louis spent the summer at his sister Louise's court in the Duchy of Saxe-Weimar, where he associated with Johann Wolfgang von Goethe. Even after the stay, Louis was in correspondence with the Weimar court and Goethe, and also with Friedrich von Schiller. Louis married his cousin Princess Louise of Hesse-Darmstadt, daughter of his uncle Prince George William of Hesse-Darmstadt, on 19 February 1777 in Darmstadt. The couple lived alternately in Darmstadt and in Fürstenlager Auerbach. They had six children.

== Landgrave of Hesse-Darmstadt ==
Louis succeeded as Landgrave of Hessen-Darmstadt on the death of his father in 1790. He presided over a significant increase in territory for Hesse-Darmstadt during the imperial reorganizations of 1801–1803, most notably the Duchy of Westphalia, hitherto subject to the Archbishop of Cologne.

== Grand duke of Hesse ==
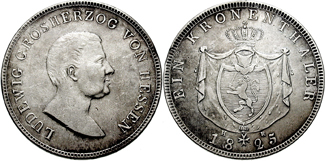
Kronenthaler of Louis, Grand Duke of Hesse and by Rhine, 1825.

Allied to Napoleon I of France, Louis was elevated to the title of a Grand Duke of Hesse in 1806 and joined the Confederation of the Rhine, leading to the dissolution of the Empire. At the Congress of Vienna in 1814/15, Louis had to give up his Westphalian territories, but was compensated with the district of Rheinhessen, with his capital Mainz on the left bank of the Rhine. Because of this addition, he amended his title to Grand Duke of Hesse and by Rhine.

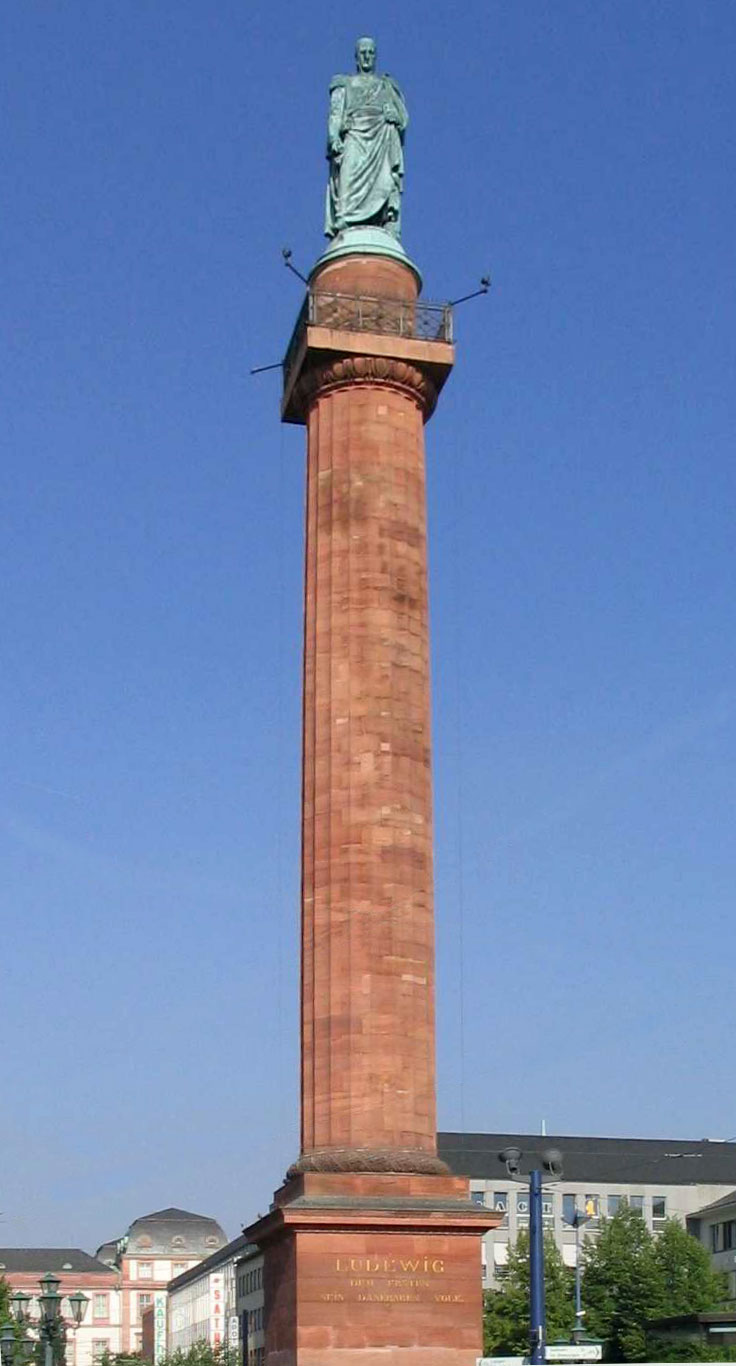
The Ludwigsmonument in Darmstadt

Grand Duke Louis I died at the age of 76 on 6 April 1830 – coincidentally the 40th anniversary of his father's death – in Darmstadt. He was succeeded as Grand Duke by his eldest son Louis II.

In 1844, a 33-metre (108 ft) column called Langer Ludwig (meaning Long Louis), was set up in his commemoration in the middle of the Luisenplatz, the largest square of Darmstadt.

== Marriage and family ==
On 19 February 1777, Louis married his first cousin, Princess Louise of Hesse-Darmstadt, a daughter of Prince George William of Hesse-Darmstadt. Together, they had eight children:

- Louis, later Grand Duke Louis II of Hesse (26 December 1777 – 16 June 1848). Married his first cousin Wilhelmine of Baden and had issue.
- Louise (16 January 1779 – 18 April 1811). Married Louis of Anhalt-Köthen and had issue.
- Ludwig Georg Karl Friedrich (31 August 1780 – 17 April 1856). Married, morganatically to Hungarian noblewoman, Caroline Török de Szendrö, later created Princess of Nidda and had issue.
- Friedrich August Karl (14 May 1788 – 16 March 1867) Never married or had issue.
- Stillborn twin daughters (11 May 1789).
- Emil (3 September 1790 – 30 April 1856)
- Ferdinand Gustav Wilhelm Friedrich (18 December 1791 – 30 January 1806) Died young

== Ancestry ==
Ancestors of Louis I, Grand Duke of Hesse

8. Ernest Louis, Landgrave of Hesse-Darmstadt
4. Louis VIII, Landgrave of Hesse-Darmstadt
9. Princess Dorothea Charlotte of Brandenburg-Ansbach
2. Louis IX, Landgrave of Hesse-Darmstadt
10. Johann Reinhard III, Count of Hanau-Lichtenberg
5. Countess Charlotte of Hanau-Lichtenberg
11. Princess Dorothea Friederike of Brandenburg-Ansbach
1. Louis I, Grand Duke of Hesse and by Rhine
12. Christian II, Count Palatine of Zweibrücken-Birkenfeld
6. Christian III, Count Palatine of Zweibrücken
13. Countess Katharina Agathe of Rappoltstein
3. Countess Palatine Caroline of Zweibrücken
14. Louis Crato, Count of Nassau-Saarbrücken
7. Countess Caroline of Nassau-Saarbrücken
15. Countess Philippine Henriette of Hohenlohe-Langenburg

== Bibliography ==
- Eckhart G. Franz (1987). "Ludwig I., (eigentlich Ludewig)". Neue Deutsche Biographie (in German). Vol. 15. Berlin: Duncker & Humblot. pp. 395–396. (full text online).
- Walther, Philip [in German] (1884). "Ludwig I. (Großherzog von Hessen und bei Rhein)". Allgemeine Deutsche Biographie (in German). Vol. 19. Leipzig: Duncker & Humblot. pp. 551–557.

Louis I, Grand Duke of Hesse House of Hesse-Darmstadt Cadet branch of the House of Hesse Born: 14 June 1753 Died: 6 April 1830
Regnal titles
Preceded by Louis IX	Landgrave of Hesse-Darmstadt; 1790–1806	Title abolished
New title	Grand Duke of Hesse and by Rhine; 1806–1830	Succeeded by Louis II
