= Colombia–Russia relations =

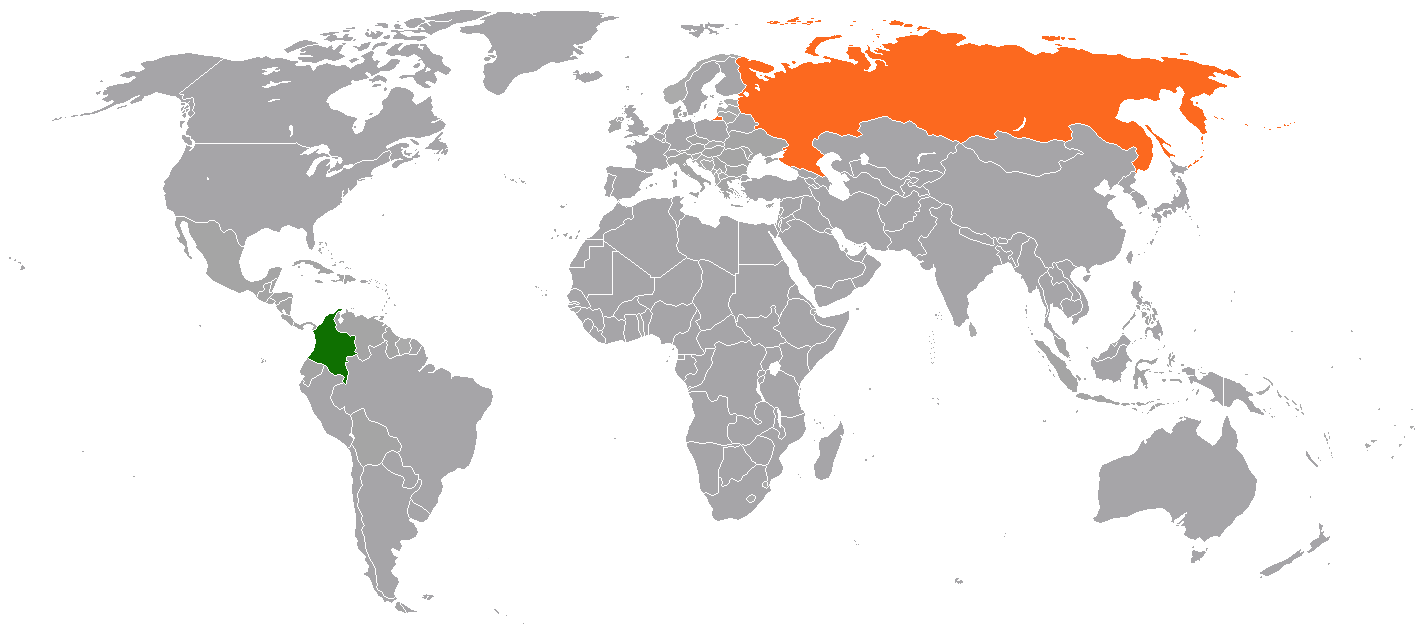
- Colombia: Russia

Envoy
- Ambassador Rafael Francisco Amador Campos: Ambassador Nikolai Karlovich Tavdumadze

Colombia–Russia relations are the bilateral relations between the Republic of Colombia and the Russian Federation. Colombia first established diplomatic relations on 25 June 1935 when Russia was then a part of the Soviet Union. Colombia then severed relations with the Soviet Union on 3 May 1948 as a result of the Bogotazo, but was restored back to normal on 19 January 1968.

Colombia has an embassy in Moscow and Russia has an embassy in Bogotá.

== Recent years ==
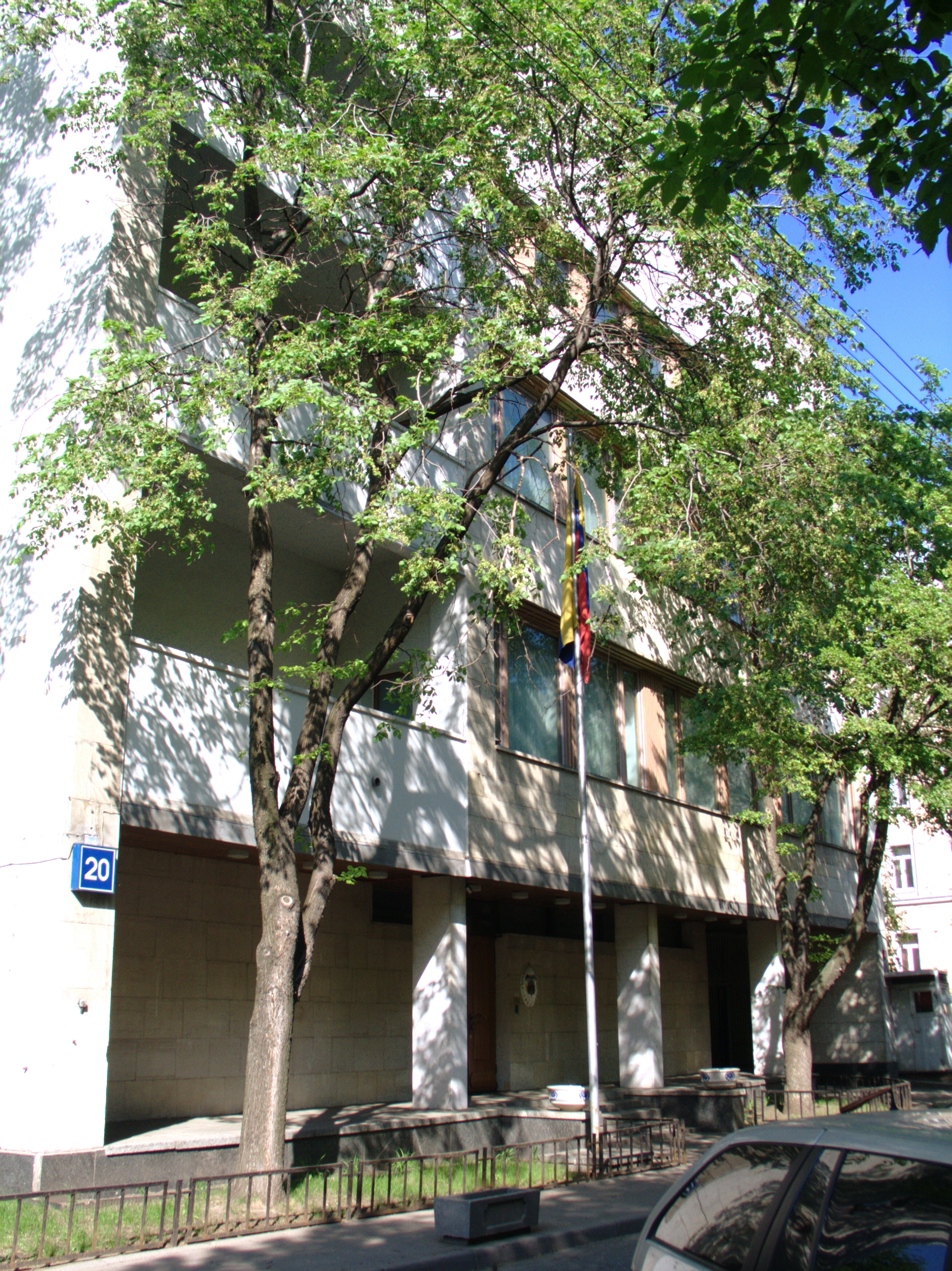
Colombian embassy in Moscow

On 3 October 2008, Colombia—considered one of the closest U.S. allies in Latin America—sent its defense minister to Russia for the first time to discuss signing a new military cooperation accord. Defense minister (and future president) Juan Manuel Santos arrived in Russia on Oct. 6 to attend an Interpol police conference and meet with his Russian counterpart Anatoly Serdyukov, along with Colombia's Ambassador to Russia, Diego José Tobón Echeverri.

Alquin "is the first Colombian defense minister to make an official visit to Russia, which is of major significance for relations between the two countries", the Colombian presidency said on its web site. Talks focused on cooperation in fighting the drugs trade, terrorism and a new defense accord, it said.

Colombian Vice-President Francisco Santos said during a visit to Russia in June that his country wants to buy fighter and transport helicopters and radar systems as it broadens its sources of defense equipment. The defense minister will attend a demonstration of Russian weaponry during his week-long visit, the presidency in Bogota said.

Colombia's efforts to court Russia came after it voiced concerns about billions of dollars in Russian arms sales to neighboring Venezuela, where President Hugo Chávez proclaimed a goal of countering U.S. influence in Latin America and was accused by Colombia of arming FARC rebels.

On 1 November 2013, the Colombian Air Force intercepted two Tu-160s of the Russian Air Force that were flying over Colombian airspace without previous governmental clearance. The two Blackjacks, as code named by the NATO, were escorted out of Colombian airspace soon after and a note of protest was sent by the Ministry of Foreign Affairs of Colombia to Moscow.

In December 2020, Juan Francisco Espinosa, head of Colombia's migration agency said that two Russian diplomats were expelled after being accused of trying to obtain military intelligence and information about the energy industry and mineral commodities.

During the 2022 Russian invasion of Ukraine, Colombian president Iván Duque affirmed his support for Ukraine during a phone call with Ukrainian president Volodymyr Zelenskyy, condemning Russia's aggression by stating that, "Colombia has been firm with its voice condemning this opprobrium, it has done so in all multilateral instances and all diplomatic channels as the only NATO partner in Latin America and the Caribbean.“

== Resident diplomatic missions ==
- Colombia has an embassy in Moscow.
- Russia has an embassy in Bogotá.

== Notes ==
- The Embassy of Colombia in Moscow is accredited to Armenia, Belarus, Kazakhstan, Kyrgyzstan, Tajikistan, Turkmenistan and Uzbekistan.

== See also ==
- Foreign relations of Colombia
- Foreign relations of Russia
- List of ambassadors of Russia to Colombia
