= Prince Emil of Hesse =

German politician (1790–1856)

Prince Emil
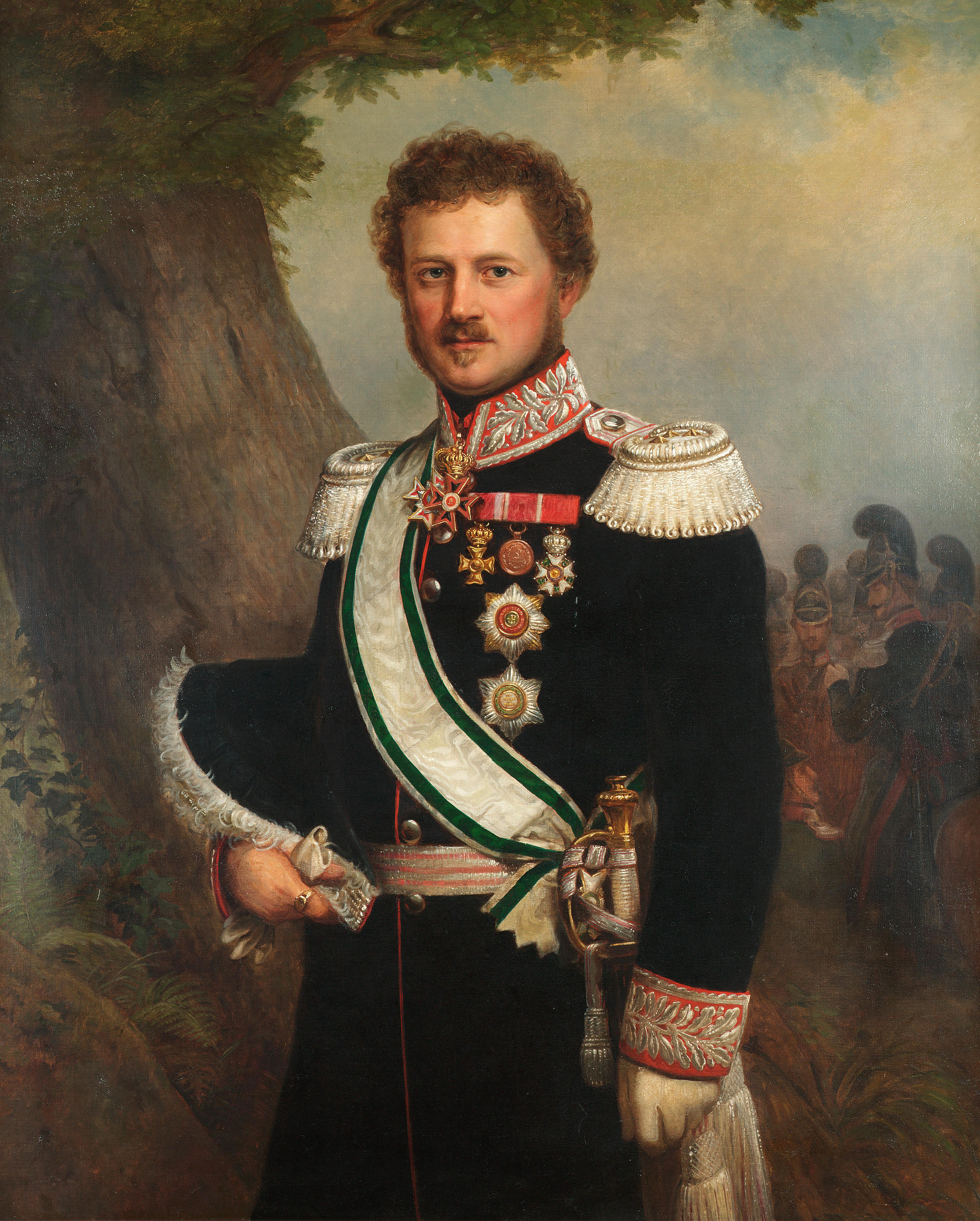
- Born: 3 June 1790; Darmstadt, Landgraviate of Hesse-Darmstadt, Holy Roman Empire
- Died: 30 April 1856 (aged 65); Baden-Baden, Grand Duchy of Baden
- Burial: Altes Mausoleum, Darmstadt
- House: Hesse
- Father: Louis I, Grand Duke of Hesse
- Mother: Princess Louise of Hesse-Darmstadt

Prince Emil of Hesse and by Rhine (German: Emil Maximilian Leopold von Hessen und bei Rhein, 3 September 1790 – 30 April 1856 was the fourth son of Louis I, Grand Duke of Hesse and his wife Princess Louise of Hesse-Darmstadt.

== Life and career ==
He was a commander during Napoleonic Wars. At a young age, Prince Emil joined the ranks of the Hessian military, which at that time was on Napoleon's side. He commanded larger units for the first time in the Austrian campaign of 1809. In the winter campaign of 1812, he led the Hessian division and returned with only 55 men out of 4000 at the start. The next year, he fought with a new Hessian Division at the Battles of Lützen and Bautzen.
In the Battle of Leipzig (1813), he commanded the Hessian Brigade in Étienne Macdonald's Corps. During the storming of Leipzig, he was taken prisoner by the Prussians. After this battle, the Grand Duchy of Hesse switched sides and Prince Emil led the Hessian Corps to France on the side of the Allies in 1814–15.

From 1820 to 1849, Prince Emil was a member of the Hessian Parliament. At his father's request, the prince participated in the development of the new state. He was superior in intelligence and energy to his older brother Louis II, but as the younger prince, he had no official role in politics. He therefore pulled the strings behind the scenes. The Hessian Constitution of 1820 was created with his participation. Prince Emil adhered to a strictly conservative policy oriented towards Austria. As an opponent of the democrats and liberals, he held them in particular dislike. In September 1830, a revolt broke out in Upper Hesse province of the Grand Duchy of Hesse, whose members expressed a general dissatisfaction with the state. Under Emil's command, the rebellion was suppressed by the army. Part of this suppression was the Södel Bloodbath, named for the number of dead and wounded.

He died in 1856, at the age of 65. He was buried in Altes Mausoleum, Rosenhöhe Park, Darmstadt.

== Honours ==
- Grand Duchy of Hesse:
  - Grand Cross of the Ludwig Order, 25 August 1807
  - Grand Cross of the Merit Order of Philip the Magnanimous, 1 May 1840
- Electorate of Hesse: Knight of the House Order of the Golden Lion, 18 November 1817
- Württemberg: Commander of the Military Merit Order, with Blue Band, 1815
- Austrian Empire:
  - Knight of the Military Order of Maria Theresa, 1815
  - Grand Cross of the Royal Hungarian Order of St. Stephen, 1826
  - Grand Cross of the Austrian Imperial Order of Leopold
- Russian Empire:
  - Knight of the Order of St. George, 3rd Class, 6 July 1815
  - Knight of the Order of St. Anna, 1st Class, 17 June 1840
  - Knight of the Imperial Order of the White Eagle, 17 June 1840
  - Knight of the Order of St. Alexander Nevsky, 17 June 1840
  - Knight of the Order of St. Andrew the Apostle the First-called, 17 June 1840
- Kingdom of Hanover: Grand Cross of the Royal Hanoverian Guelphic Order, 1821
- Baden:
  - Knight of the House Order of Fidelity, 1836
  - Grand Cross of the Order of the Zahringer Lion, 1836
- Saxe-Weimar-Eisenach: Grand Cross of the Order of the White Falcon, 24 December 1839
- Kingdom of Bavaria: Knight of the Royal Order of St. Hubert, 1840
- French Empire: Grand Cross of the Imperial Order of the Legion of Honour, June 1853
