= Countess Palatine Caroline of Zweibrücken =

Caroline of Zweibrücken

Landgravine consort of Hesse-Darmstadt
- Tenure: 17 October 1768 – 30 March 1774
- Born: 9 March 1721; Strasbourg
- Died: 30 March 1774 (aged 53); Darmstadt
- Spouse: Louis IX, Landgrave of Hesse-Darmstadt (m. 1741)
- Issue: Caroline, Landgravine of Hesse-Homburg; Frederika Louisa, Queen of Prussia; Louis I, Grand Duke of Hesse; Amelie, Hereditary Princess of Baden; Wilhelmina Louisa, Tsarevna of Russia; Luise, Grand Duchess of Saxe-Weimar-Eisenach; Landgrave Frederick; Landgrave Christian
- House: Palatinate-Zweibrücken
- Father: Christian III, Count Palatine of Zweibrücken
- Mother: Caroline of Nassau-Saarbrücken

Caroline of the Palatinate-Zweibrücken (Caroline Henriette Christiane Philippine Louise; 9 March 1721 – 30 March 1774) was Landgravine of Hesse-Darmstadt by marriage to Louis IX, Landgrave of Hesse-Darmstadt. She was famed as one of the most learned women of her time and known as The Great Landgräfin.

Together with Louis IX, her husband, she became the most recent common ancestors of all current sovereigns of hereditary monarchies in Europe in 2022 after Charles III became King of the United Kingdom.

== Biography ==
Caroline was the daughter of Christian III, Duke of Zweibrücken and his wife Caroline of Nassau-Saarbrücken.

Caroline married on 12 August 1741 in Zweibrücken, Louis IX, Landgrave of Hesse-Darmstadt. The marriage was arranged and unhappy: Caroline was interested in music and literature, while Louis was interested in military matters. She lived separated from him at Buchsweiler. In 1772, Caroline promoted the politician Friedrich Karl von Moser.

Caroline was better known as The Great Landgräfin, a name given to her by Johann Wolfgang von Goethe. She befriended several writers and philosophers of her time, such as Johann Gottfried Herder, Christoph Martin Wieland and Goethe. Wieland wished he had the power to make her Queen of Europa.

Caroline also had contact with Frederick II of Prussia. She was one of the few women that the Alte Fritz respected, and he famously referred to her as the Glory and Wonder of our century; after Caroline's death, he sent an urn to Darmstadt with the text femina sexu, ingenio vir ('A woman by sex, a man by spirit').

Caroline and her husband became the most recent common ancestors of all reigning hereditary European monarchs in 2022 after Charles III became King of the United Kingdom.

== Issue ==
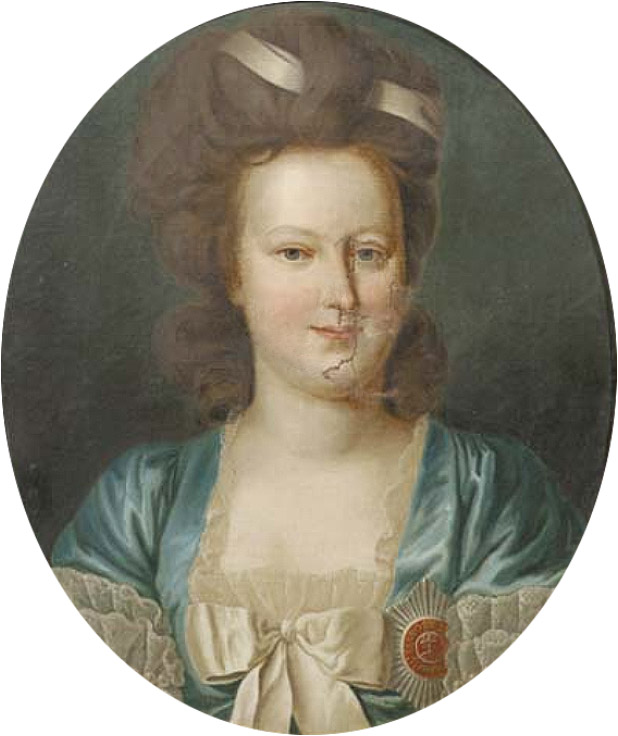
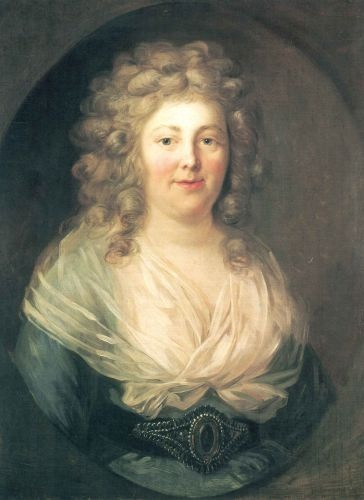
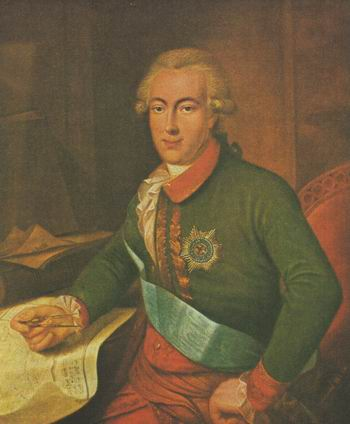
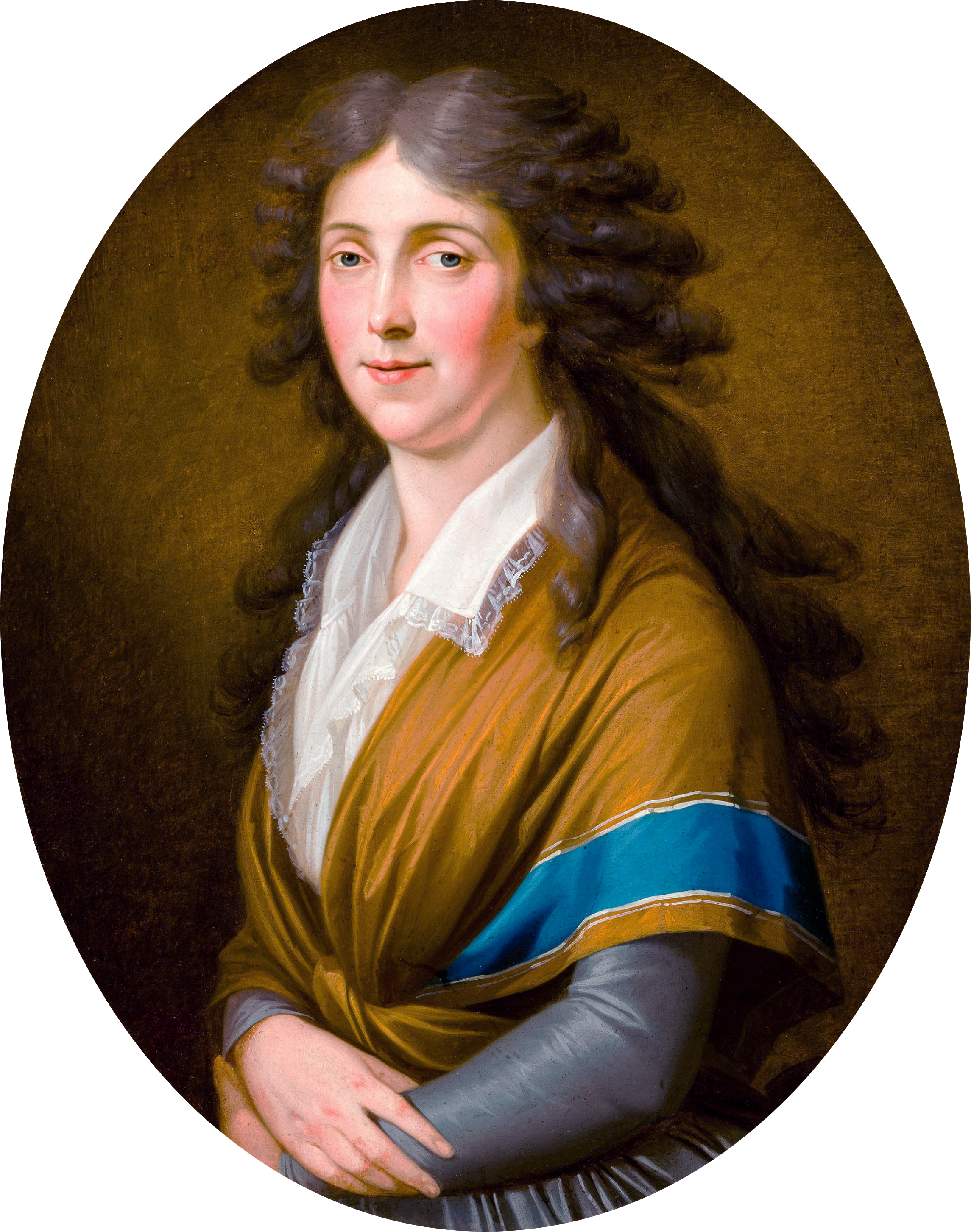
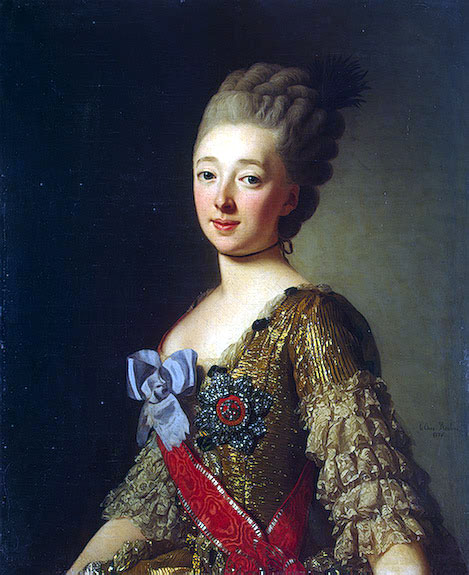
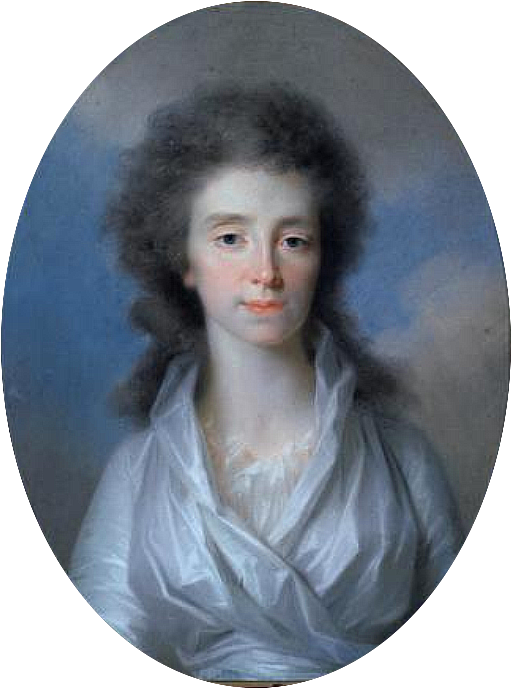
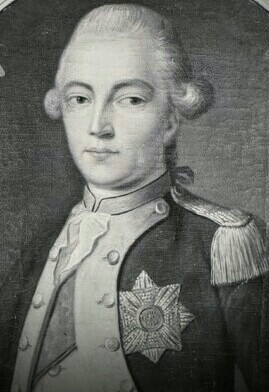
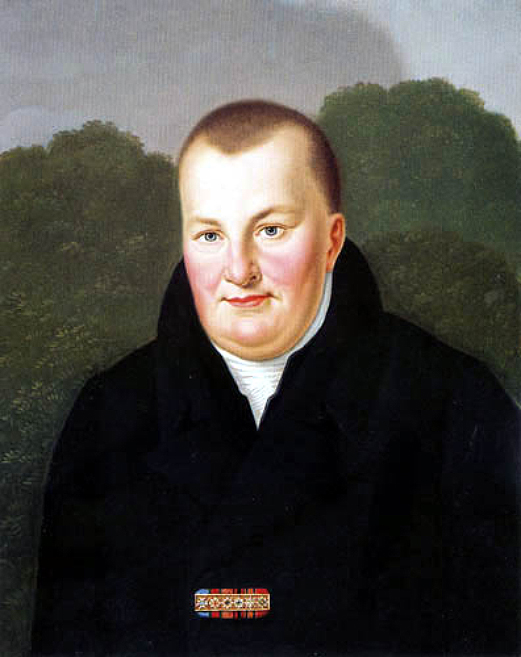
Name	Portrait	Birth	Death	Notes
Caroline; Landgravine of Hesse-Homburg		2 March 1746	18 September 1821	Married in 1768 Frederick V, Landgrave of Hesse-Homburg, had issue
Frederika Louisa; Queen of Prussia		16 October 1751	25 February 1805	Married in 1769 Frederick William II of Prussia, had issue.
Louis I Grand Duke of Hesse		14 June 1753	6 April 1830	Married in 1777 Louise of Hesse-Darmstadt, had issue
Amalie; Hereditary Princess of Baden		20 June 1754	21 June 1832	Married in 1774 Charles Louis, Hereditary Prince of Baden, had issue
Wilhelmina Louisa; Grand Duchess Natalia Alexeievna of Russia		25 June 1755	26 April 1776	Married in 1773 the future Emperor Paul I of Russia, no surviving issue
Louisa Augusta; Grand Duchess of Saxe-Weimar-Eisenach		30 January 1757	14 February 1830	Married in 1775 Charles Augustus of Saxe-Weimar-Eisenach, had issue
Friedrich; Landgrave of Hesse-Darmstadt		10 June 1759	11 March 1802	never married, mistress was Catharina Wenedick, 2 illegitimate children: Lisette Thimotee Friedrich (born: 24 January 1799) and Friedrich Friedrich (born around 1800)
Christian; Landgrave of Hesse-Darmstadt		25 November 1763	17 April 1830	Died unmarried

== Ancestry ==
Ancestors of Countess Palatine Caroline of Zweibrücken

8. Christian I, Count Palatine of Birkenfeld-Bischweiler
4. Christian II, Count Palatine of Zweibrücken-Birkenfeld
9. Countess Palatine Magdalene Catherine of Zweibrücken
2. Christian III, Count Palatine of Zweibrücken
10. Johann Jakob, Count of Rappoltstein
5. Countess Katharina Agathe of Rappoltstein
11. Wild- and Rhinegravine Anna Claudia of Salm-Kyrburg
1. Countess Palatine Caroline of Zweibrücken
12. Gustav Adolph, Count of Nassau-Saarbrücken
6. Louis Crato, Count of Nassau-Saarbrücken
13. Countess Eleonore Claire of Hohenlohe-Neuenstein
3. Caroline of Nassau-Saarbrücken
14. Henry Frederick, Count of Hohenlohe-Langenburg
7. Princess Philippine Henriette of Hohenlohe-Langenburg
15. Countess Juliana Dorothea of Castell-Remlingen

== See also ==
- Marie Louise of Hesse-Kassel – Most recent common ancestress of all reigning hereditary European monarchs from the end of World War II until 2022
- Louise of Hesse-Kassel – Common ancestress of many reigning hereditary European monarchs
  - Descendants of Christian IX of Denmark – Lists progeny of Louise of Hesse-Kassel

Countess Palatine Caroline of Zweibrücken House of Palatinate-Zweibrücken Cadet branch of the House of Wittelsbach Born: 9 March 1721 Died: 30 March 1774
German royalty
Vacant Title last held by Dorothea Charlotte of Brandenburg-Ansbach	Landgravine consort of Hesse-Darmstadt; 17 October 1768 – 30 March 1774	Vacant Title next held by Louise of Hesse-Darmstadt
