= Princess Louise of Hesse-Darmstadt (1761–1829) =

Louise of Hesse-Darmstadt
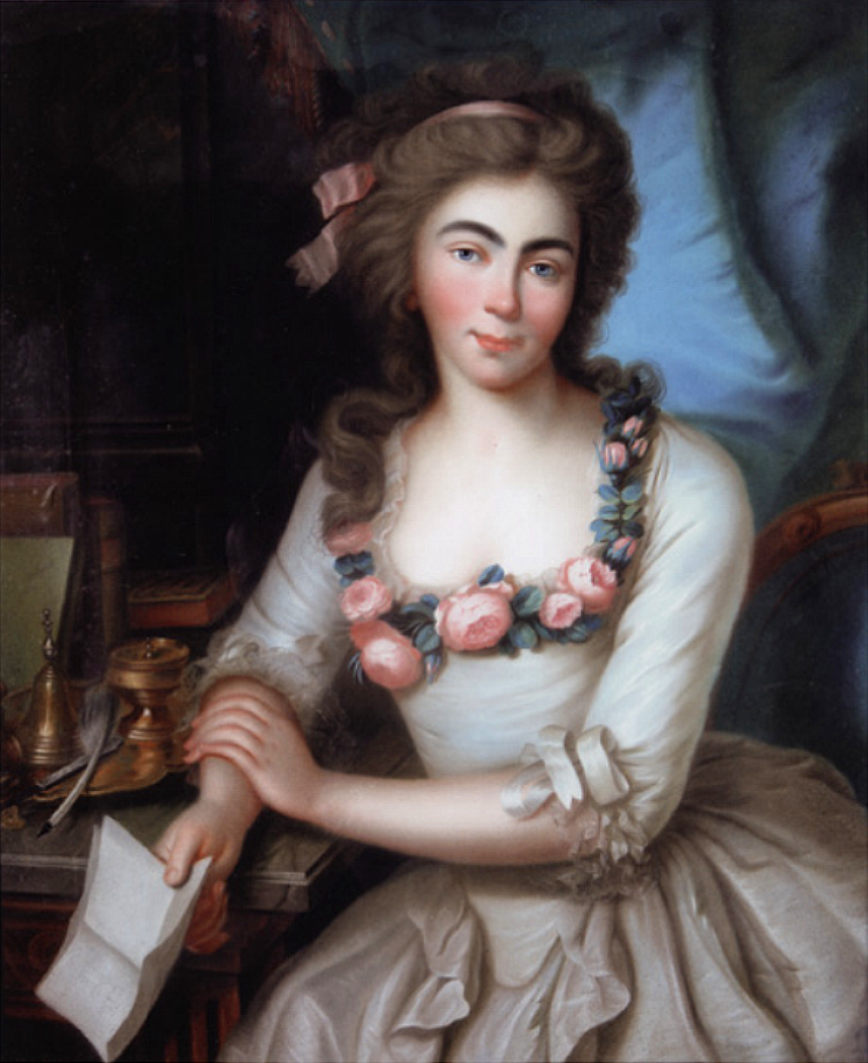
- 1783 portrait

Landgravine consort of Hesse-Darmstadt
- Tenure: 6 April 1790 – 13 August 1806

Grand Duchess consort of Hesse and by Rhine
- Tenure: 13 August 1806 – 24 October 1829
- Born: 15 February 1761; Darmstadt
- Died: 24 October 1829 (aged 68); Auerbach
- Spouse: Louis I, Grand Duke of Hesse (m. 1777)
- Issue Detail: Louis II, Grand Duke of Hesse and by Rhine; Landgravine Louise; Prince George; Prince Frederick; Prince Emil; Landgrave Gustav
Names
- Louise Henriette Karoline
- House: House of Hesse-Darmstadt
- Father: Prince George William of Hesse-Darmstadt
- Mother: Countess Maria Louise Albertine of Leiningen-Falkenburg-Dagsburg

Princess Louise of Hesse-Darmstadt (Louise Henriette Karoline; 15 February 1761 – 24 October 1829), was the first Grand Duchess of Hesse and by Rhine by marriage.

== Life ==
Louise was a daughter of Prince George William of Hesse-Darmstadt from his marriage to Countess Maria Louise Albertine of Leiningen-Dagsburg-Falkenburg, daughter of Count Christian Karl Reinhard of Leiningen-Dachsburg-Falkenburg-Heidesheim.

The princess was in 1770 in the entourage of Marie Antoinette, as they traveled to France for her marriage. Louise exchanged letters with the French queen until 1792.

Louise married on 19 February 1777 in Darmstadt, her cousin the then hereditary prince Louis I of Hesse-Darmstadt. Her husband ruled Hesse-Darmstadt from 1790 as Landgrave Louis X and from 1806 as Ludwig I, Grand Duke of Hesse and the Rhine.

Louise spent the summer months since 1783 in the State Park Fürstenlager, and died there in 1829. Here provided charity to the population Auerbach. The Grand Duchess was described as amiable and revered by the nation. Johann Wolfgang von Goethe stayed at her court and Friedrich Schiller read from his Don Carlos in her salon. It was said that Napoleon Bonaparte promised the beautiful Louise, whom he believed to be one of the cleverest women of her time, that he would give her a crown.

Louise found respite from physical illness at Fürstenlager and died on 24 October, 1829. Luisenstraße and Luisenplatz in Darmstadt are named after Louise.

== Issue ==
From her marriage with Louis, Louise had the following children:

- Louis II (1777–1848), Grand Duke of Hesse and by Rhine; married in 1804 princess Wilhelmine of Baden (1788–1836).
- Luise Karoline of Hesse-Darmstadt (1779–1811); married in 1800 Prince Louis of Anhalt-Köthen (1778–1802).
- George of Hesse-Darmstadt (1780–1856); married morganatically in 1804 Caroline Török de Szendrő (1786–1862), "Baroness of Menden" 1804, "Countess of Nidda," 1808, "Princess of Nidda 1821; (divorced 1827).
- Frederick of Hesse-Darmstadt (1788–1867).
- Stillborn twin daughters (1789).
- Emil of Hesse-Darmstadt (1790–1856).
- Gustav of Hesse-Darmstadt (1791–1806).

== Ancestry ==
Ancestors of Princess Louise of Hesse-Darmstadt (1761–1829)

8. Ernest Louis, Landgrave of Hesse-Darmstadt
4. Louis VIII, Landgrave of Hesse-Darmstadt
9. Princess Dorothea Charlotte of Brandenburg-Ansbach
2. Prince George William of Hesse-Darmstadt
10. Johann Reinhard III, Count of Hanau-Lichtenberg
5. Countess Charlotte of Hanau-Lichtenberg
11. Princess Dorothea Friederike of Brandenburg-Ansbach
1. Princess Louise of Hesse-Darmstadt
12. Johann, Count of Leiningen-Dagsburg-Falkenburg
6. Christian Karl Reinhard of Leiningen-Dagsburg-Falkenburg
13. Countess Johanna Magdalene of Hanau-Lichtenberg
3. Countess Maria Louise Albertine of Leiningen-Dagsburg-Falkenburg
14. Count Georg Ludwig of Solms-Rödelheim
7. Countess Katharina Polyxena of Solms-Rödelheim
15. Countess Charlotte Sibylle of Ahlefeldt

== Sources ==
=== Bibliography ===
- Hertzog, Carl (1844). Ludewig I und sein Denkmal zu Darmstadt Denkschrift zur Enthüllungsfeier 1844 (in German). L. Pabst.
- Walther, Philipp Alexander Ferdinand (1865). Darmstadt wie es war und wie es geworden (in German). Jonghans.
- Günther, Carl Friedrich (1843). Anekdoten, Charakterschilderungen und Denkwürdigkeiten aus der Hessischen Geschichte Zusammengestellt von Carl Friedrich Günther (in German). Jonghaus. p. 172.

Princess Louise of Hesse-Darmstadt (1761–1829) House of Hesse-Darmstadt Cadet branch of the House of Hesse Born: 15 February 1761 Died: 24 October 1829
German royalty
Vacant Title last held by Caroline of Zweibrücken	Landgravine consort of Hesse-Darmstadt; 6 April 1790 – 13 August 1806	Title abolished
Title created	Grand Duchess consort of Hesse and by Rhine; 13 August 1806 – 24 October 1829	Vacant Title next held by Wilhelmine of Baden
