= Rafael Francisco Amador Campos =

Colombian lawyer and politician

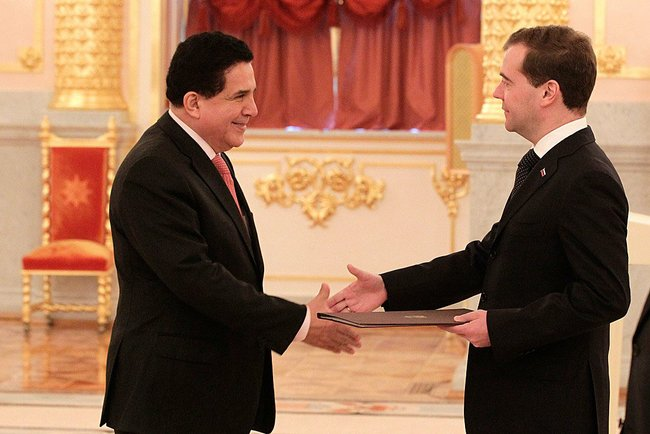
- Ambassador Amador (left) presents his Letters of Credence to Russian president, Dmitry Medvedev (right), in 2011.

Colombia Ambassador to Russia
- Incumbent
- Assumed office 7 December 2011
- President: Juan Manuel Santos Calderón
- Preceded by: Diego José Tobón Echeverri

Senator of Colombia
- In office 1 January 1992 – 20 July 1994
- In office 20 July 1990 – 4 July 1991

Member of the Chamber of Representatives of Colombia
- In office 20 July 2006 – 20 July 1998
- Constituency: Cundinamarca Department
- In office 20 July 1982 – 20 July 1990
- Constituency: Cundinamarca Department

Personal details
- Born: 14 January 1948 (age 78) Girardot, Cundinamarca, Colombia
- Party: Liberal (1990–present)
- Other political affiliations: New Liberalism (1982-1990)
- Education: Pontifical Xavierian University (LLB, 1972); University of the Andes (MBA, 1976)
- Profession: Lawyer

Rafael Francisco Amador Campos (born 14 January 1948) is a Colombian lawyer and politician, who is currently serving as the ambassador of Colombia to Russia. As a Liberal party politician, he served in Congress as Representative for Cundinamarca on two separate periods of two terms each, first from 1982 to 1990, and then from 1998 to 2006. He was twice elected Senator of Colombia for the same legislative period, first in 1990, and then again in 1991 following the ratification of the 1991 Constitution, and served until 1994.
