= Kristina Abelli Elander =

Swedish artist

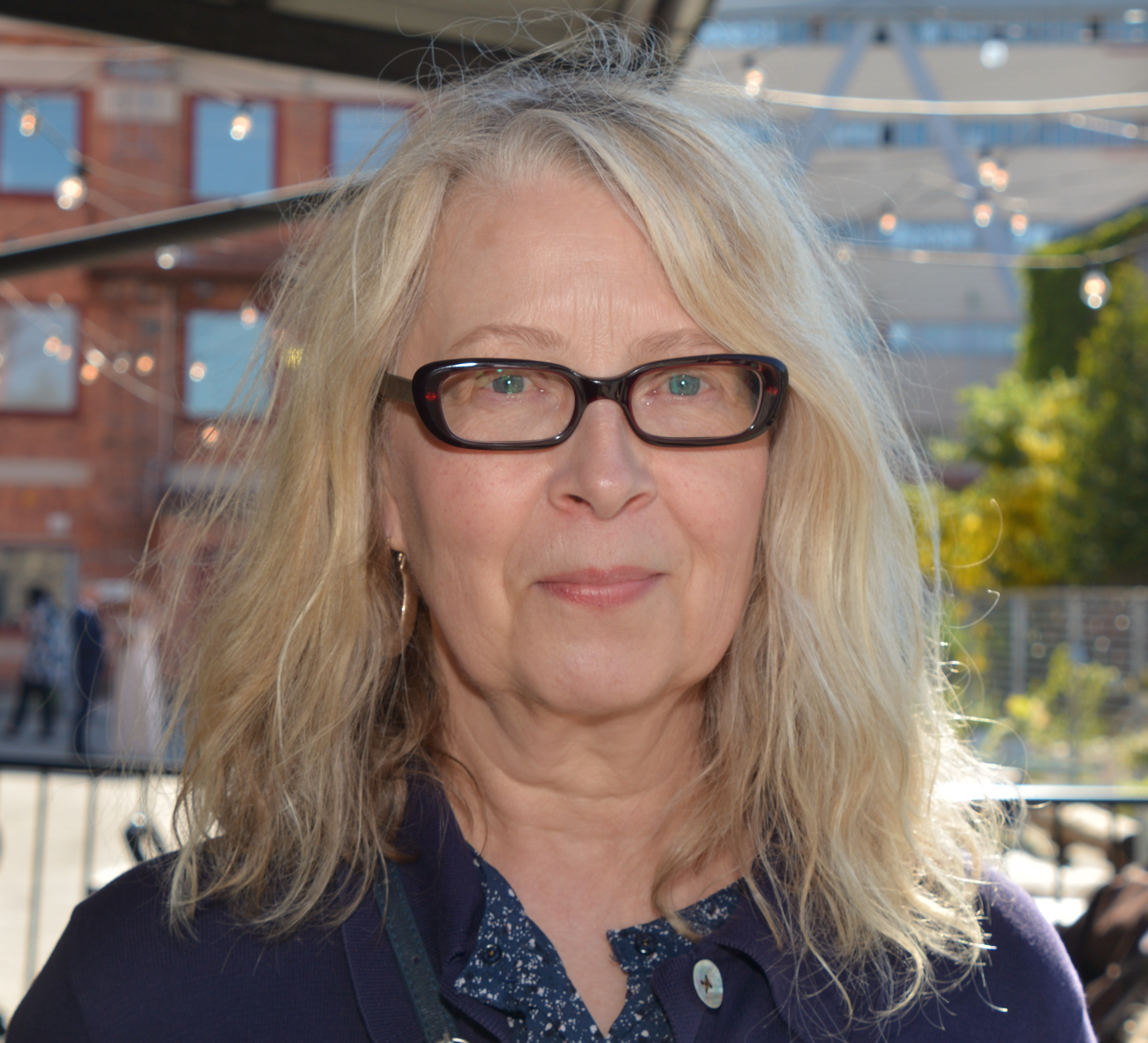
- Elander in 2016
- Born: Ellen Kristina Abelli Elander; 25 June 1952 (age 73); Stockholm, Sweden
- Occupation: Artist

Ellen Kristina Abelli Elander (born 25 June 1952) is a Swedish artist. She received her education at Birkagårdens folkhögskola between 1972 and 1973, and made her solo debut at Galleri Händer in Stockholm in 1978. Early on, she worked with paintings in acrylic and canvas, and openly criticized the gender issues of the time.

She released several drawings during the 1980s and 2000s in the comic books Galago and Hjälp! She later worked with larger room installations and wall paintings, and figures in ceramics and textiles that have been shown in the gallery Schaper & Sundberg in Stockholm.

== Bibliography ==
- Prinsessor utan Panik, Stockholm 2007, ISBN 978-91-633-1917-4
- Sexstrejk nu! sa Lysistrate, LL-förlaget 2009, ISBN 978-91-7053-294-8
- Staden, Flickorna, Tiden...tiden, Bokförlaget Mormor, Stockholm 2011 ISBN 978-91-85841-35-6
- "The Street Series and Other Works" Bullfinch Publishing 2011 ISBN 978-91-86583-07-1 tryck Balto Print, Litauen och Olssons Grafiska Stockholm
