= Natalia Alexeievna (Wilhelmina of Hesse-Darmstadt) =

Tsarevna of Russia

- Tsarevna of Russia
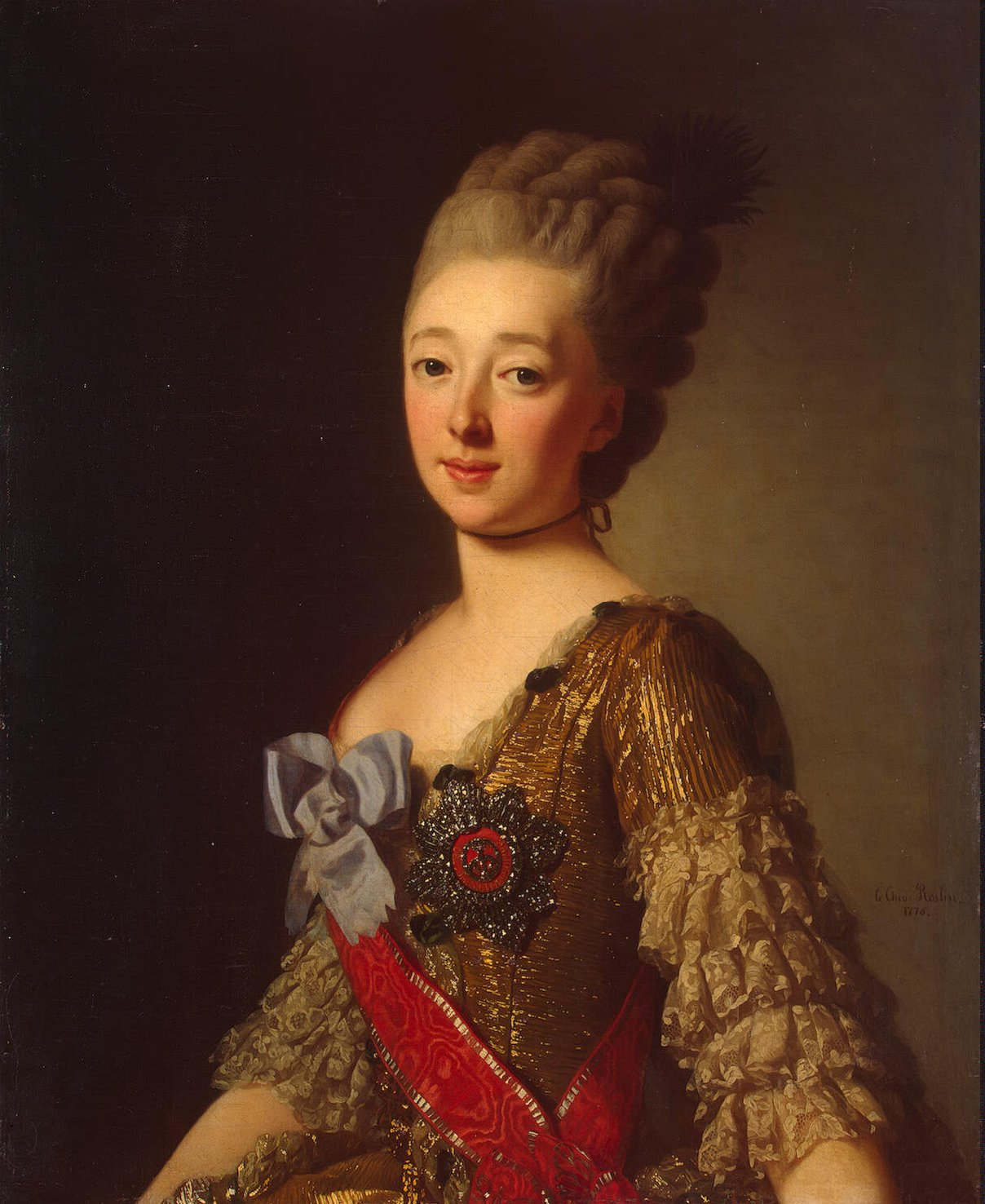
- Portrait by Alexander Roslin, Hermitage Museum
- Born: Princess Wilhelmina Louisa of Hesse-Darmstadt; 25 June 1755; Prenzlau, Brandenburg, Prussia
- Died: 15 April 1776 (aged 20); St. Petersburg, Russian Empire
- Spouse: Paul Petrovich, Tsarevich of Russia (m. 1773)
- Issue: Stillborn son
- House: Hesse-Darmstadt
- Father: Louis IX, Landgrave of Hesse-Darmstadt
- Mother: Countess Palatine Caroline of Zweibrücken

Natalia Alexeievna, Tsarevna of Russia (25 June 1755 – 15 April 1776) was the first wife of Paul Petrovich, Tsesarevich of Russia (future Emperor Paul I), son of the Empress Catherine II. She was born as Princess Wilhelmina Louisa of Hesse-Darmstadt as the fifth child of Louis IX, Landgrave of Hesse-Darmstadt, and Countess Palatine Caroline of Zweibrücken.

== Life ==
=== Early years ===
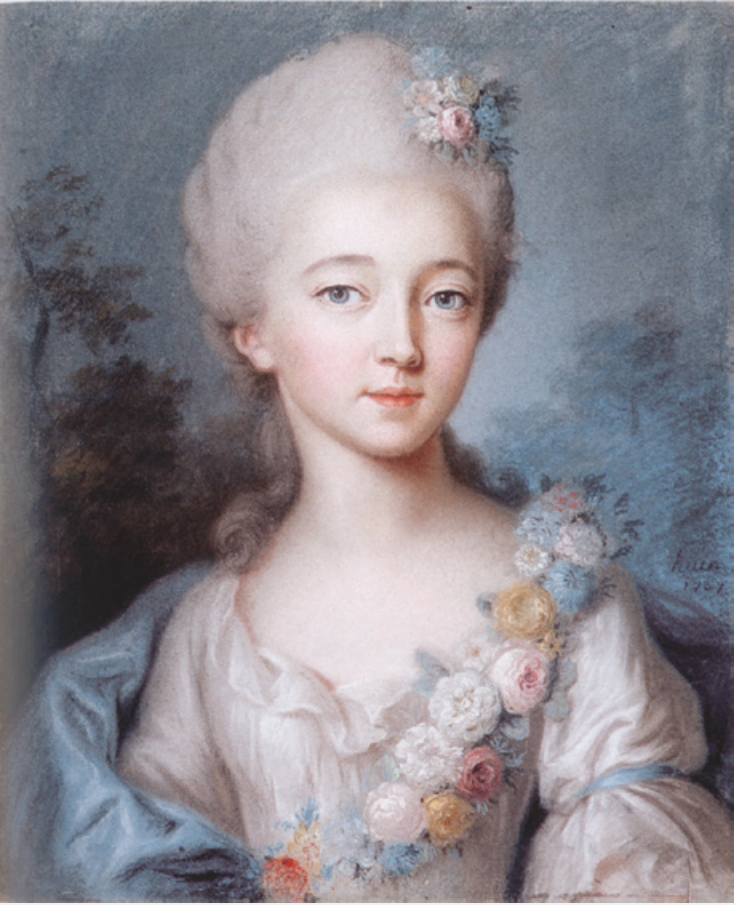
Pastel by Charles Alexis Huin, 1770

Born in Prenzlau, Uckermark, Brandenburg, Prussia, on 25 June 1755 as the sixth child and fourth daughter of the nine children born from the Landgravial couple, Wilhelmina Louisa Augusta of Hesse-Darmstadt was brought up under the strict supervision of her mother, nicknamed "The Great Landgräfin", famed as one of the most learned women of her time and who befriended several writers and philosophers of her time, such as Goethe, Herder and other celebrities. Already in her youth, Wilhelmina was distinguished by an outstanding mind, strong character and ardent temperament.

=== Journey to Russia and Marriage ===
In 1772, Tsarevich Pavel Petrovich of Russia was 18 years old, and his mother, Empress Catherine II, began the search for a bride for him. After a long search, two candidates remained: Sophia Dorothea of Württemberg and Wilhelmina. But Sophia Dorothea was just 13 years old, and Catherine II urgently needed an heir, so the Empress was forced to opt for one of the remaining three unmarried daughters of the Landgrave; however, this option did not please her. In a letter to her envoy, she wrote:

Princess Wilhelmina of Darmstadt is described to me, especially in terms of the goodness of her heart, as the perfection of nature; but aside from the fact that, so far as I know, perfection does not exist in the world, you say that she has an impetuous mind prone to discord. This, in combination with the mind of her sovereign-father and with the large number of sisters and brothers, some of whom are already married, and some of whom are still waiting to be betrothed to royalty, prompts me in this regard toward caution. However, I ask you to take the trouble to resume your observations...

King Frederick II of Prussia — to whom Catherine turned for "recommendations" in this matter — wanted the marriage, moreover because the Landgrave's eldest daughter Frederica was married to the heir of the Prussian throne and so, an alliance between Prussia and Russia would be a beneficial outcome.

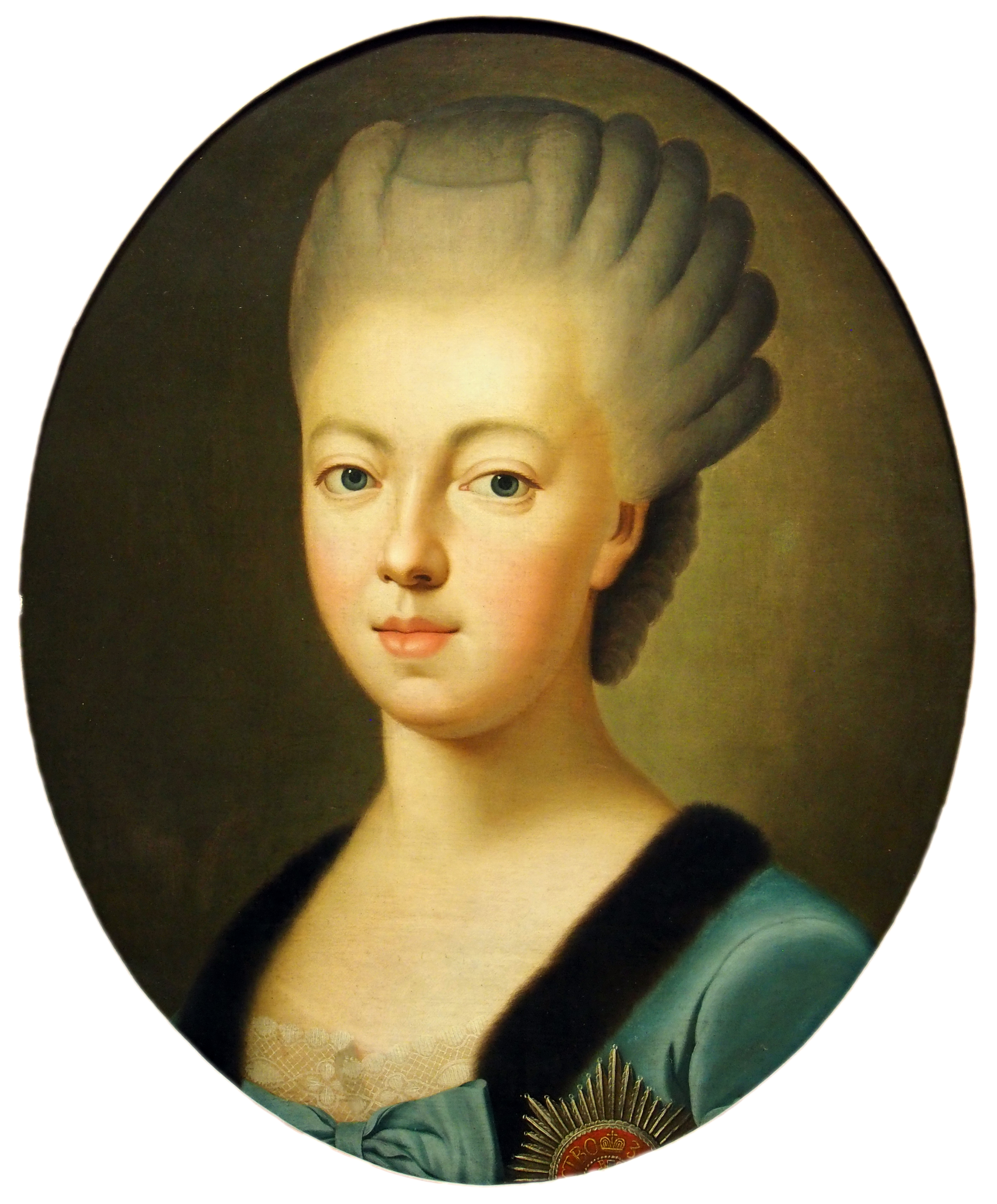
Portrait by Johann Ludwig Strecker, c. 1772–3

In October 1772, Catherine wrote to Nikita Ivanovich Panin:

The Landgravine, thank God, has three more daughters for marriage; ask her to come here with all them; we will be very unhappy if we don't choose one of the three that are suitable for us. Let's look at them, and then decide. These daughters are: Amalie (aged 18); Wilhelmina (aged 17) and Louise (aged 15)... I don't particularly dwell on the praise lavished on the eldest of the princesses of Hesse by the King of Prussia, because I know how he chooses and what he needs, and the one he likes could hardly please us. According to him - the stupider, the better: I have seen and known those chosen by him.

Unable to decide which one was worthy, the Empress sent an invitation to Wilhelmina, her sisters and their mother to visit Russia. The three Princesses studied to perfect their French, worked on their dancing, practiced dropping deep curtseys, and completed their wardrobes. Their first stop was in Berlin where from there a flotilla of four ships, sent by Catherine, which took them to Russia. It was the Grand Duke Paul's best friend, young Andrei Razumovsky, who commanded the frigate that carried the young ladies and their mother. He was immediately captivated by these charming passengers, and was particularly taken with Wilhelmine. She was not insensible to the admiration of Andrei.

The meeting of the Tsarevich with the Hessian princesses occurred in Gatchina on 15 June 1773. Paul chose Wilhelmina; she was very pretty, happy and exuberant, and the heir of the Russian throne was very delighted with her. Catherine wrote:

...My son from the first minute fell in love with princess Wilhelmine, I gave him three days to see if he wоuld waver, and since this princess is superior in all aspects to her sisters...the eldest is very meek; the youngest seems to be very clever; the middle one has all the qualities we have hoped for: her face is charming, the features are correct, she is gentle, smart; I am very pleased with her, and my son is in love...

On 27 June 1773, the Landgravine of Hesse-Darmstadt and her three daughters were awarded with the Order of Saint Catherine. Almost one month later, on 15 August, Princess Wilhelmina was accepted in the Orthodox faith with the name and title of Grand Duchess Natalia Alexeievna, and the next day her betrothal with the Tsarevich Paul took place amidst great ostentation.

=== Tsarevna ===
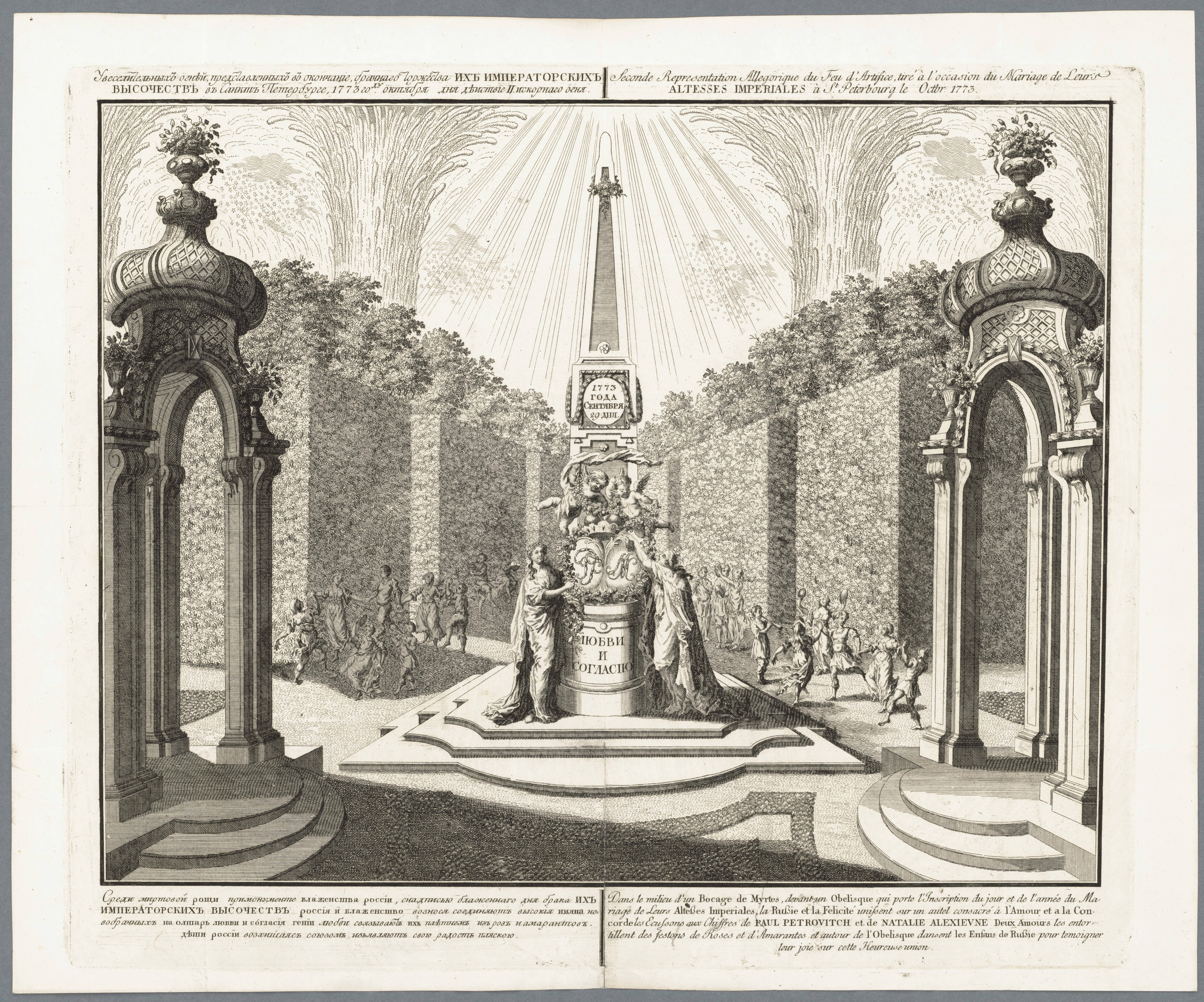
Wedding of Tsarevich Paul Petrovich and Natalia Alexeievna.

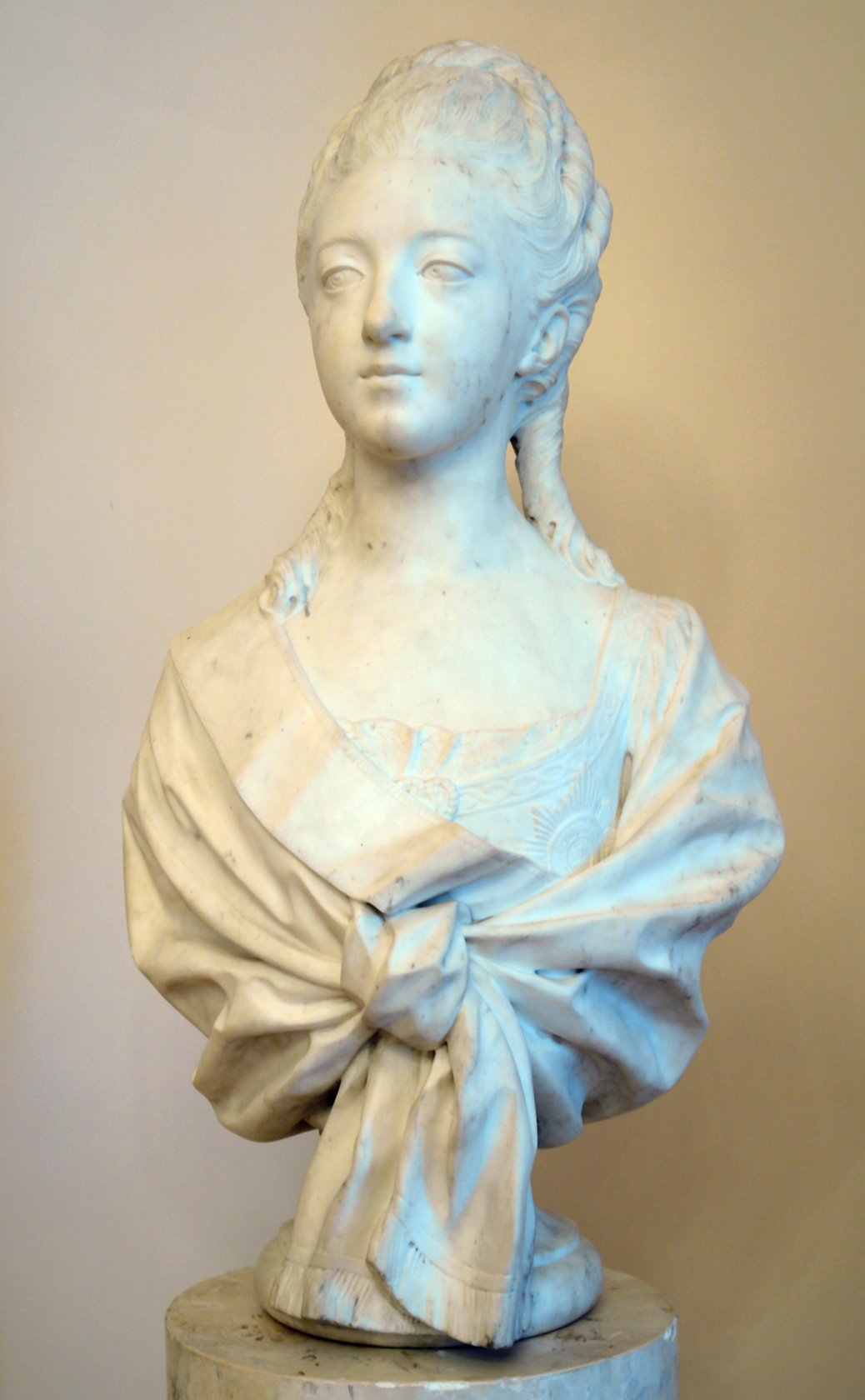
Grand Duchess Natalia Alexeivna, bust by Marie-Anne Collot, 1775. Currently at Saint Michael's Castle, Saint Petersburg.

On 29 September 1773, the wedding between Tsarevich Paul Petrovich and Natalia Alexeievna took place in the Church of the Nativity of the Most Holy Theotokos (currently Kazan Cathedral). Very soon she showed her domineering and impetuous nature: the English envoy James Harris, 1st Earl of Malmesbury noted that she "ruled her husband despotically, without even giving herself the trouble to show the least attachment to him."

During the first few months of her marriage, Natalia's gaiety and spontaneity animated the whole court. The Empress was delighted with her initially, but as time passed, difficulties started to appear. The new Tsarevna's union was a failure: although Paul Petrovich loved his wife, Natalia was disappointed with her life as a married woman; for this, she began several political intrigues against Catherine II in order to help her husband to take the throne, because she felt such a need to accede to power due to her disastrous conjugal life. In addition, the Tsarevna refused to learn Russian and, being raised in modern Europe, showed certain independence in her statements, adhering to liberal ideas and even occasionally advocated the liberation of the peasants. Catherine II clearly didn't like her daughter-in-law's behavior. She wrote:

...Fearing evil, we do not trust the whole earth. Do not listen to any good or bad advice. Until now, there is no good nature, no caution, no prudence in all of this, and God knows what will happen because they do not listen to anyone and everyone wants to do it their own way. After a year and a half and more, she still does not speak Russian; we want to be taught, but she was not diligent in her studies. Her many debts are twice bigger than the biggest fortunes in the country, and hardly anyone in Europe gets so much.

Despite the fact that the Tsarevna wasn't in love with her husband, she used her influence over him and tried to keep him away from everyone except for a narrow circle of her friends. According to contemporaries, the Tsarevna was a serious and ambitious woman, with a proud heart and a cool temper. In addition, she had been married for two years, but there was still no heir, to the concern of the court and the Empress.

However, in early 1776 the long-awaited pregnancy of the Tsarevna was officially announced to the court. Rumours of her affair with the charming Andrey Razumovsky aroused doubts about the real paternity of the child; however, for Catherine II didn't seem to care if was her son's or Andrei's. Natalia was carrying the heir to the Russian throne, and for the Empress, that was all that mattered.

=== Death ===
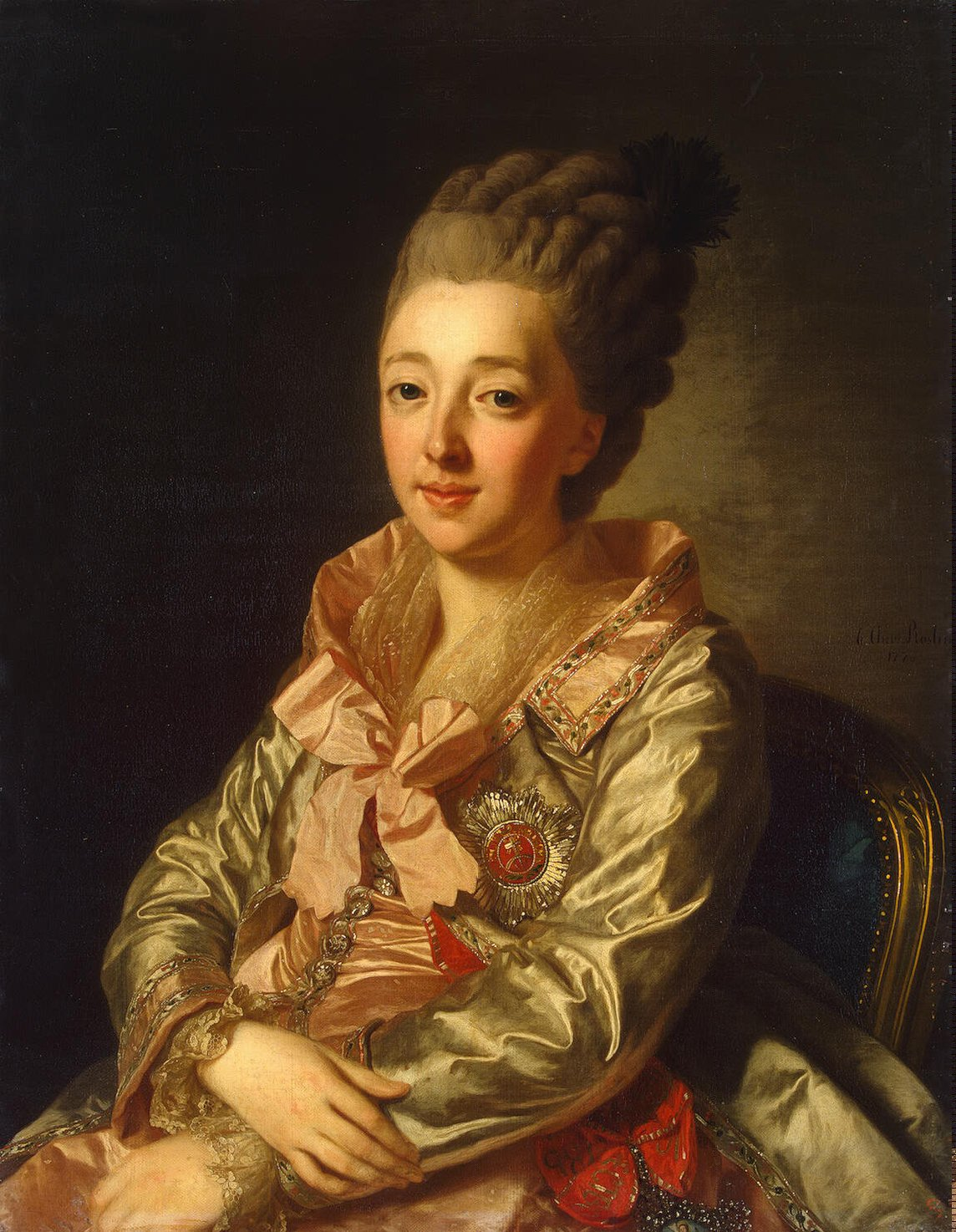
Portrait by Roslin painted during her fatal pregnancy, 1776

On 10 April 1776 around 4 a.m., the Tsarevna began the first labour pains. The contractions lasted for several days, and despite this, the baby couldn't be born naturally. The child died in the womb and infected her body.

"The case is very bad" — Catherine II told her State Secretary perhaps the next day, in a letter marked 5 a.m. —. "What way did the child go, and his mother go. Keep this up to yourself"....

After five days of agonizing pain and distress on 15 April at 5 a.m., Grand Duchess Natalia Alexeievna ultimately died after giving birth to a stillborn son.

Catherine II wrote:

You can imagine that she had to suffer and we with her. My heart was tormented; I did not have a minute of rest during these five days and did not leave the Grand Duchess day or night until her death. She told me: "You are a great nurse." Imagine my situation: one should be consoled, the other should be encouraged. I was exhausted both in body and soul...

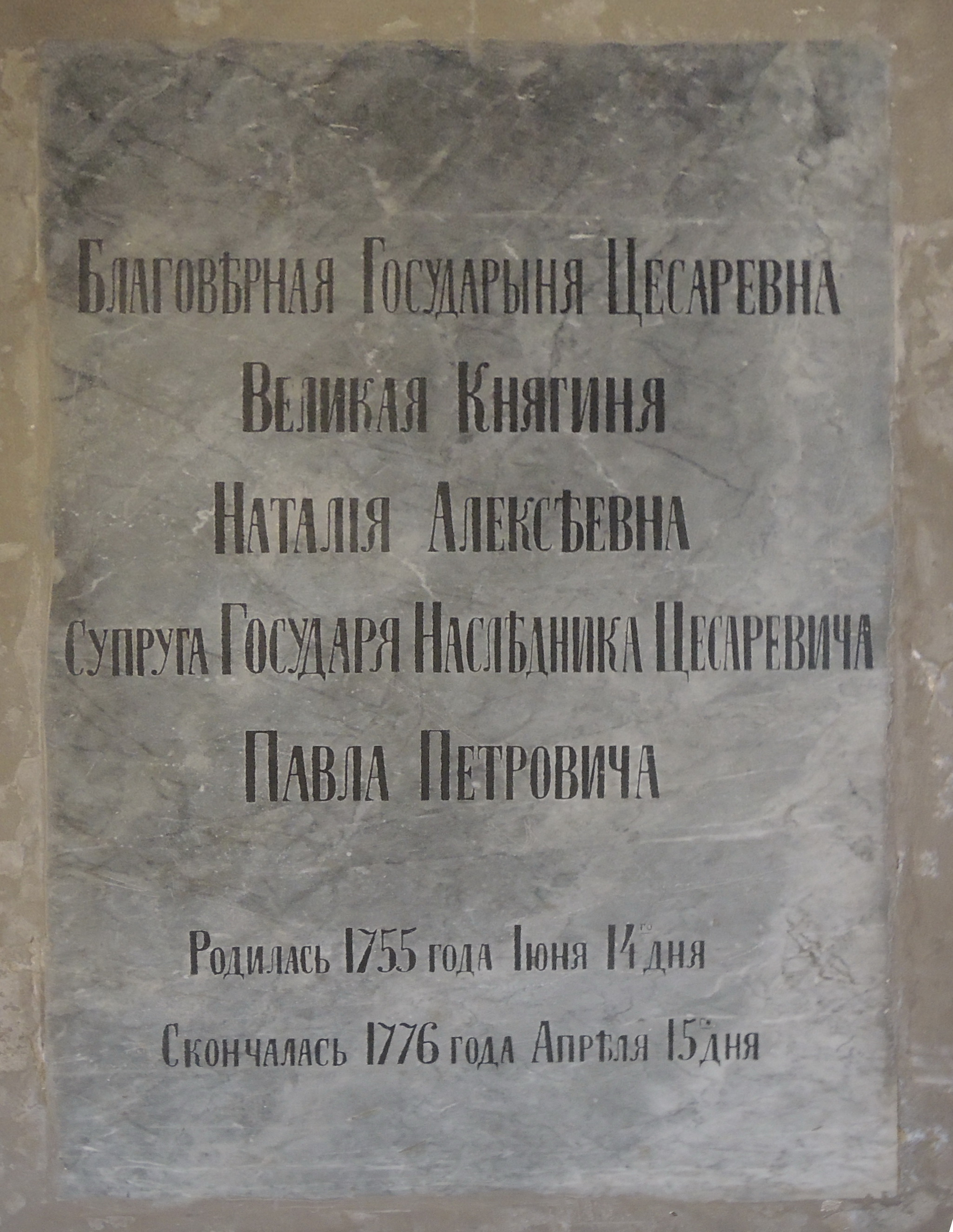
Natalia Alexeivna's tombstone at Annunciation Church of the Alexander Nevsky Lavra, Saint Petersburg.

Her devastated husband's grief was so severe that he initially refused to allow Natalia's body to be removed. Finally, Natalia was buried in the Annunciation Church of the Alexander Nevsky Lavra in Saint Petersburg.

It was widely rumored that the Empress disliked Natalia Alexeievna, and the court gossiped that she didn't allow the doctors to save her daughter-in-law. The autopsy, however, showed that the Grand Duchess had a birth defect called spinal curvature (scoliosis), and reportedly in childhood she suffered from a hunchback or stoop, which was corrected, according to the custom of that time, with a rigid corset, which led to an incorrect arrangement of the pelvic bones in such way that could be impossible for Natalia to have a baby naturally through the birth canal, and that the medicine of that time was powerless to help her.

The Chevalier de Corberon reported that no one believed the official autopsy and that Potemkin — following Catherine II's orders — visited Natalia's midwife, named Zorich, and gave her the order to kill the Grand Duchess. Also, the Chevalier questioned the surgeon Moreau during a later dinner, and he wrote:

He [Moreau] told me privately that in his opinion, the surgeons and doctors of the court were asses. The Grand Duchess should never have died. In truth, it is very surprising that greater care is not taken in advance with a Grand Duchess. The people are very angry, weeping and bitter. Yesterday and today, people in shops were heard to say, "The young ladies die; the old babas (old women) [an allusion to the Empress] never die".

== Archives ==
Natalia's letters to her mother, Countess Palatine Caroline of Zweibrücken, written from the Russian court between 1773 and 1774, are preserved in the Hessian State Archive (Hessisches Staatsarchiv Darmstadt) in Darmstadt, Germany. Natalia's letters to her father, Louis IX, Landgrave of Hesse-Darmstadt, also written from Russia, are preserved in the Hessian State Archive in Darmstadt. In addition, Natalia's correspondence with her relatives, written from the Russian court between 1773 and 1776, is also preserved in the Hessian State Archive in Darmstadt.

== Ancestry ==
Ancestors of Natalia Alexeievna (Wilhelmina of Hesse-Darmstadt)

8. Ernest Louis, Landgrave of Hesse-Darmstadt
4. Louis VIII, Landgrave of Hesse-Darmstadt
9. Princess Dorothea Charlotte of Brandenburg-Ansbach
2. Louis IX, Landgrave of Hesse-Darmstadt
10. Johann Reinhard III, Count of Hanau-Lichtenberg
5. Countess Charlotte of Hanau-Lichtenberg
11. Princess Dorothea Friederike of Brandenburg-Ansbach
1. Princess Wilhelmina of Hesse-Darmstadt
12. Christian II, Count Palatine of Zweibrücken-Birkenfeld
6. Christian III, Count Palatine of Zweibrücken
13. Countess Katharina Agathe of Rappoltstein
3. Countess Palatine Caroline of Zweibrücken
14. Louis Crato, Count of Nassau-Saarbrücken
7. Countess Caroline of Nassau-Saarbrücken
15. Countess Philippine Henriette of Hohenlohe-Langenburg

== Bibliography ==
- H. Troyat: Catherine the Great, 1980 ISBN 0-425-05186-2
- A. Danilova: Russian emperors, German princesses. Dynastic connections, human destinies. - M .: Izografus, Eksmo-Press, 2002.
- L.N. Vasilyeva: Wives of the Russian crown. vol. II "Atlantis XXI century", 1999.
- V.G. Grigoryan: Romanovs. Biographical reference book. - AST, 2007.
- V. Korsakova: Natalya Alekseevna (Grand Duchess) - Russian Biographical Dictionary - in 25 volumes. - SPb., 1896–1918.
- E. Pchelov: Romanovs. Dynasty history. — Olma-Press, 2004.
- M.O. Logunova: Death and burial of the Grand Duchess Natalia Alekseevna // History of St. Petersburg. No. 6 (52) / 2009. - pp. 49–54.
- Description of the triumph of the highly nuptial combination of His Imperial Highness the Right-Believing Tsarevich and Grand Duke Pavel Petrovich with Her Imperial Highness the Right-Believing Empress Grand Duchess Natalia Alekseevna, which happened happily in September 1773 on the 29th day. 1773 (in Russian)
