= Starnberg – Landsberg am Lech =

Constituency for the elections to the German Bundestag

223 Starnberg – Landsberg am Lech
- Electoral district for the Bundestag
- Starnberg – Landsberg am Lech in 2025
- State: Bavaria
- Population: 297,400 (2019)
- Electorate: 214,841 (2025)
- Major settlements: Germering; Landsberg am Lech; Starnberg
- Area: 1,313.7 km^{2}

Current electoral district
- Created: 1980
- Party: CSU
- Member: Michael Kießling
- Elected: 2017, 2021, 2025

Starnberg – Landsberg am Lech (English: Starnberg – Landsberg at the Lech) is an electoral constituency (German: Wahlkreis) represented in the Bundestag. It elects one member via first-past-the-post voting. Under the current constituency numbering system, it is designated as constituency 223. It is located in southwestern Bavaria, comprising the districts of Landsberg and Starnberg.

Starnberg – Landsberg am Lech was created for the 1980 federal election. Since 2017, it has been represented by Michael Kießling of the Christian Social Union (CSU).

== Geography ==
Starnberg – Landsberg am Lech is located in southwestern Bavaria. As of the 2021 federal election, it comprises the districts of Landsberg and Starnberg as well as the municipality of Germering from the Fürstenfeldbruck district.

== History ==
Starnberg – Landsberg am Lech was created in 1980, then known as Starnberg. It acquired its current name in the 2017 election. In the 1980 through 1998 elections, it was constituency 210 in the numbering system. In the 2002 and 2005 elections, it was number 225. In the 2009 through 2021 elections, it was number 224. From the 2025 election, it has been number 223.

Originally, the constituency comprised the districts of Bad Tölz-Wolfratshausen, Miesbach, and Starnberg. In the 2005 and 2009 elections, it lost the municipality of Krailling from Starnberg district. In the 2013 election, it regained Krailling while losing the Gauting municipality. It acquired its current borders in the 2017 election.

Election	No.	Name	Borders
1980	210	Starnberg	Bad Tölz-Wolfratshausen district; Miesbach district; Starnberg district
1983	210	Starnberg	Bad Tölz-Wolfratshausen district; Miesbach district; Starnberg district
1987	210	Starnberg	Bad Tölz-Wolfratshausen district; Miesbach district; Starnberg district
1990	210	Starnberg	Bad Tölz-Wolfratshausen district; Miesbach district; Starnberg district
1994	210	Starnberg	Bad Tölz-Wolfratshausen district; Miesbach district; Starnberg district
1998	210	Starnberg	Bad Tölz-Wolfratshausen district; Miesbach district; Starnberg district
2002	225	Starnberg	Bad Tölz-Wolfratshausen district; Miesbach district; Starnberg district
2005	225	Starnberg	Bad Tölz-Wolfratshausen district; Miesbach district; Starnberg district (excluding Krailling municipality)
2009	224	Starnberg	Bad Tölz-Wolfratshausen district; Miesbach district; Starnberg district (excluding Krailling municipality)
2013	224	Starnberg	Bad Tölz-Wolfratshausen district; Miesbach district; Starnberg district (excluding Gauting municipality)
2017	224	Starnberg – Landsberg am Lech	Landsberg district; Starnberg district; Fürstenfeldbruck district (only Germering municipality)
2021	224	Starnberg – Landsberg am Lech	Landsberg district; Starnberg district; Fürstenfeldbruck district (only Germering municipality)
2025	223	Starnberg – Landsberg am Lech	Landsberg district; Starnberg district; Fürstenfeldbruck district (only Germering municipality)

== Members ==
Like most constituencies in rural Bavaria, it is an CSU safe seat, the party holding the seat continuously since its creation. It was first represented by Franz-Ludwig Schenk Graf von Stauffenberg from 1980 to 1987, followed by Wolfgang Gröbl from 1987 to 1998. Ilse Aigner was then representative from 1998 to 2013. Alexander Radwan served one term from 2013 to 2017. Michael Kießling was elected in 2017.

Election	Member	Party	%
1980	Franz-Ludwig Schenk Graf von Stauffenberg	CSU	60.2
1983	Franz-Ludwig Schenk Graf von Stauffenberg	CSU	63.6
1987	Wolfgang Gröbl	CSU	61.3
1990	Wolfgang Gröbl	CSU	56.4
1994	Wolfgang Gröbl	CSU	59.7
1998	Ilse Aigner	CSU	57.0
2002	Ilse Aigner	CSU	63.3
2005	Ilse Aigner	CSU	59.7
2009	Ilse Aigner	CSU	54.0
2013	Alexander Radwan	CSU	54.1
2017	Michael Kießling	CSU	42.1
2021	Michael Kießling	CSU	38.2
2025	Michael Kießling	CSU	42.9

== Election results ==
=== 2025 election ===
Federal election (2025): Starnberg – Landsberg am Lech
Notes:	Blue background denotes the winner of the electorate vote. Pink background denotes a candidate elected from their party list. Yellow background denotes an electorate win by a list member, or other incumbent. A ✓ or ✗ denotes status of any incumbent, win or lose respectively.						
Party	Candidate	Votes	%	±%	Party votes	%	±%
CSU	✓ Michael Kießling	80,382	42.9	▲4.7	72,605	38.7	▲6.6
Greens	Petra Verena Machnik	31,338	16.7	▼3.2	31,552	16.8	▼1.3
SPD	Carmen Wegge	24,165	12.9	▼0.4	21,598	11.5	▼4.4
AfD	Alexander Neumeyer	24,163	12.9	▲6.9	25,281	13.5	▲7.3
FDP	Paul Noah Friedrich	6,665	3.6	▼5.7	10,962	5.8	▼7.4
Left	Bernhard Feilzer	6,441	3.4	▲1.4	9,709	5.2	▲2.7
FW	Rolf Jürgen Hofmann	6,061	3.2	▼1.8	5,146	2.7	▼2.3
BSW					5,015	2.7	
APT	Sabine Hahn	2,431	1.3		1,453	0.8	▼0.2
Volt	Titus Karl Robert Muschik	2,119	1.1	▲0.6	1,264	0.7	▲0.3
dieBasis	Manfred Diedrich Helmers	1,521	0.8	▼2.2	774	0.4	▼2.1
PARTEI	Christoph Raab	1,504	0.8	▼0.5	882	0.5	▼0.3
ÖDP					757	0.4	▼0.3
BP	Markus Wagner	703	0.4		429	0.2	▼0.2
BD					131	0.1	
Humanists					131	0.1	Steady
MLPD					25	0.0	Steady
Informal votes		855			634		
Total valid votes		187,493			187,714		
Turnout		188,348	87.7	▲3.4			
CSU hold	Majority	49,044	26.2	▲7.9			

=== 2021 election ===
Federal election (2021): Starnberg – Landsberg am Lech
Notes:	Blue background denotes the winner of the electorate vote. Pink background denotes a candidate elected from their party list. Yellow background denotes an electorate win by a list member, or other incumbent. A ✓ or ✗ denotes status of any incumbent, win or lose respectively.						
Party	Candidate	Votes	%	±%	Party votes	%	±%
CSU	✓ Michael Kießling	68,617	38.2	▼3.9	57,906	32.1	▼6.2
Greens	Martina Neubauer	35,809	19.9	▲8.0	32,663	18.1	▲5.0
SPD	Carmen Wegge	23,985	13.3	▼3.3	28,584	15.9	▲3.2
FDP	Britta Hundesrügge	16,585	9.2	▼0.4	23,893	13.3	▼0.9
AfD	Rainer Groß	10,715	6.0	▼2.9	11,066	6.1	▼3.8
FW	Rasso von Ehrenwiesen	9,035	5.0	▲2.6	9,026	5.0	▲3.4
Left	Simone Ketterl	3,701	2.1	▼1.9	4,446	2.5	▼3.0
dieBasis	Manfred Heinlein	5,365	3.0		4,505	2.5	
Tierschutzpartei					1,775	1.0	▲0.1
PARTEI	Christoph Raab	2,333	1.3		1,299	0.7	▲0.1
ÖDP	Stella Sadowsky	1,972	1.1	▼0.7	1,293	0.7	▼0.2
BP					847	0.5	▼0.5
Volt	Joachim Nibbe	982	0.5		688	0.4	
Pirates					600	0.3	0.0
Team Todenhöfer					442	0.2	
V-Partei3	Cornelia Fiegel	721	0.4		265	0.1	0.0
Unabhängige					238	0.1	
Gesundheitsforschung					199	0.1	0.0
Humanists					128	0.1	
Bündnis C					118	0.1	
du.					88	0.0	
NPD					81	0.0	▼0.1
LKR					42	0.0	
The III. Path					36	0.0	
DKP					24	0.0	0.0
MLPD					12	0.0	0.0
Informal votes		1,158			714		
Total valid votes		179,820			180,264		
Turnout		180,978	84.2	▲1.4			
CSU hold	Majority	32,808	18.3	▼7.1			

=== 2017 election ===
Federal election (2017): Starnberg – Landsberg am Lech
Notes:	Blue background denotes the winner of the electorate vote. Pink background denotes a candidate elected from their party list. Yellow background denotes an electorate win by a list member, or other incumbent. A ✓ or ✗ denotes status of any incumbent, win or lose respectively.						
Party	Candidate	Votes	%	±%	Party votes	%	±%
CSU	Michael Kießling	73,948	42.1	▼10.8	67,512	38.3	▼10.4
SPD	Christian Winklmeier	29,308	16.7	▼1.5	22,332	12.7	▼4.3
Greens	Kerstin Täubner-Benicke	20,864	11.9	▲1.4	23,111	13.1	▲2.4
FDP	Britta Hundesrügge	16,893	9.6	▲3.3	24,950	14.2	▲6.5
AfD	Martin Hebner	15,607	8.9	▲8.1	17,460	9.9	▲4.9
Left	Bernhard Feilzer	6,983	4.0	▲1.2	9,594	5.4	▲2.5
FW	Harald von Herget	4,264	2.4	▼0.3	2,863	1.6	▼0.2
ÖDP	Karin Boolzen	3,119	1.8	▼0.5	1,620	0.9	▼0.3
BP	Heinz Thannheiser	2,253	1.3	▲0.4	1,792	1.0	▼0.1
Tierschutzpartei					1,531	0.9	▲0.1
PARTEI					1,072	0.6	
Pirates	Tobias McFadden	2,024	1.2	▼1.1	601	0.3	▼1.5
Independent	Claudia Ruthner	416	0.2				
DM					347	0.2	
DiB					343	0.2	
BGE					330	0.2	
V-Partei³					321	0.2	
NPD					242	0.1	▼0.3
Gesundheitsforschung					178	0.1	
MLPD					25	0.0	0.0
BüSo					23	0.0	0.0
DKP					19	0.0	
Informal votes		1,334			747		
Total valid votes		175,679			176,266		
Turnout		177,013	82.9	▲6.7			
CSU hold	Majority	44,640	25.4	▼11.1			

=== 2013 election ===
Federal election (2013): Starnberg
Notes:	Blue background denotes the winner of the electorate vote. Pink background denotes a candidate elected from their party list. Yellow background denotes an electorate win by a list member, or other incumbent. A ✓ or ✗ denotes status of any incumbent, win or lose respectively.						
Party	Candidate	Votes	%	±%	Party votes	%	±%
CSU	Alexander Radwan	97,383	54.1	▼0.2	93,201	51.5	▲6.8
SPD	Klaus Barthel	31,678	17.6	▲2.0	27,345	15.1	▲2.4
Greens	Karl Bär	16,031	8.9	▼1.7	16,417	9.1	▼3.0
FDP	Sabine Leutheusser-Schnarrenberger	13,381	7.4	▼6.9	13,346	7.4	▼11.6
AfD					10,160	5.6	
FW	Konrad Specker	9,150	5.1		4,887	2.7	
Left	Andreas Wagner	5,041	2.8	▼1.0	4,796	2.6	▼1.4
Pirates	Fabian Müller	4,011	2.2		2,804	1.5	▲0.1
BP					2,609	1.4	▲0.4
ÖDP	Helmut Jenne	3,429	1.9		1,985	1.1	▲0.2
Tierschutzpartei					1,322	0.7	▲0.1
NPD					739	0.4	▼0.4
REP					415	0.2	▼0.2
DIE VIOLETTEN					397	0.2	▼0.1
DIE FRAUEN					235	0.1	
Party of Reason					201	0.1	
PRO					123	0.1	
RRP					49	0.0	▼1.1
BüSo					35	0.0	0.0
MLPD					22	0.0	0.0
Informal votes		2,179			1,195		
Total valid votes		180,104			181,088		
Turnout		182,283	74.3	▼1.2			
CSU hold	Majority	65,705	36.5	▼1.7			

=== 2009 election ===
Federal election (2009): Starnberg
Notes:	Blue background denotes the winner of the electorate vote. Pink background denotes a candidate elected from their party list. Yellow background denotes an electorate win by a list member, or other incumbent. A ✓ or ✗ denotes status of any incumbent, win or lose respectively.						
Party	Candidate	Votes	%	±%	Party votes	%	±%
CSU	✓ Ilse Aigner	101,261	54.0	▼5.7	83,545	44.3	▼8.0
SPD	Klaus Barthel	29,651	15.8	▼6.2	24,158	12.8	▼6.4
FDP	Sabine Leutheusser-Schnarrenberger	27,350	14.6	▲6.7	36,046	19.1	▲5.7
Greens	Karl Bär	19,809	10.6	▲3.1	23,110	12.3	▲2.5
Left	Sieglinde Knöchner	7,215	3.8	▲1.9	7,705	4.1	▲1.8
Pirates					2,724	1.4	
RRP					2,081	1.1	
BP					1,995	1.1	▲0.4
ÖDP					1,765	0.9	
NPD	Ron Appelt	2,283	1.2	▲0.1	1,455	0.8	0.0
Tierschutzpartei					1,214	0.6	
FAMILIE					946	0.5	0.0
REP					804	0.4	▼0.1
DIE VIOLETTEN					531	0.3	
CM					164	0.1	
PBC					143	0.1	0.0
DVU					106	0.1	
BüSo					73	0.0	0.0
MLPD					33	0.0	0.0
Informal votes		2,523			1,494		
Total valid votes		187,569			188,598		
Turnout		190,092	75.7	▼5.8			
CSU hold	Majority	71,610	38.2	▲0.5			

=== 2005 election ===
Federal election (2005):Starnberg
Notes:	Blue background denotes the winner of the electorate vote. Pink background denotes a candidate elected from their party list. Yellow background denotes an electorate win by a list member, or other incumbent. A ✓ or ✗ denotes status of any incumbent, win or lose respectively.						
Party	Candidate	Votes	%	±%	Party votes	%	±%
CSU	✓ Ilse Aigner	119,161	59.7	▼3.8	104,663	52.2	▼10.8
SPD	Klaus Barthel	43,843	22.0	0.0	38,408	19.2	▼0.2
FDP	Sabine Leutheusser-Schnarrenberger	15,733	7.9	▲1.1	26,850	13.4	▲7.8
Greens	Anne Franke	14,839	7.4	▲1.9	19,618	9.8	▲0.3
Left	Werner Bäumler	3,858	1.9	▲1.2	4,566	2.3	▲1.7
NPD	Karl Richter	2,230	1.1		1,456	0.7	▲0.6
BP					1,368	0.7	▲0.5
REP					1,093	0.5	▲0.3
Familie					913	0.5	
GRAUEN					629	0.3	▲0.2
Feminist					348	0.2	▲0.1
PBC					238	0.1	▲0.1
BüSo					101	0.1	0.0
MLPD					61	0.0	
Informal votes		2,428			1,780		
Total valid votes		199,664			200,312		
Turnout		202,092	81.5	▼3.7			
CSU hold	Majority	75,318	37.7				
