= Gehrels =

Gehrels is a surname. Notable people with this surname include:

- Franz Gehrels (1922–2018), German-American economist
- Jürgen Gehrels (born 1935), German businessman
- Neil Gehrels (1952–2017), American astrophysicist
- Tom Gehrels (1925–2011), Dutch–American astronomer
