= Three Crowns =

National emblem of Sweden

Three Crowns
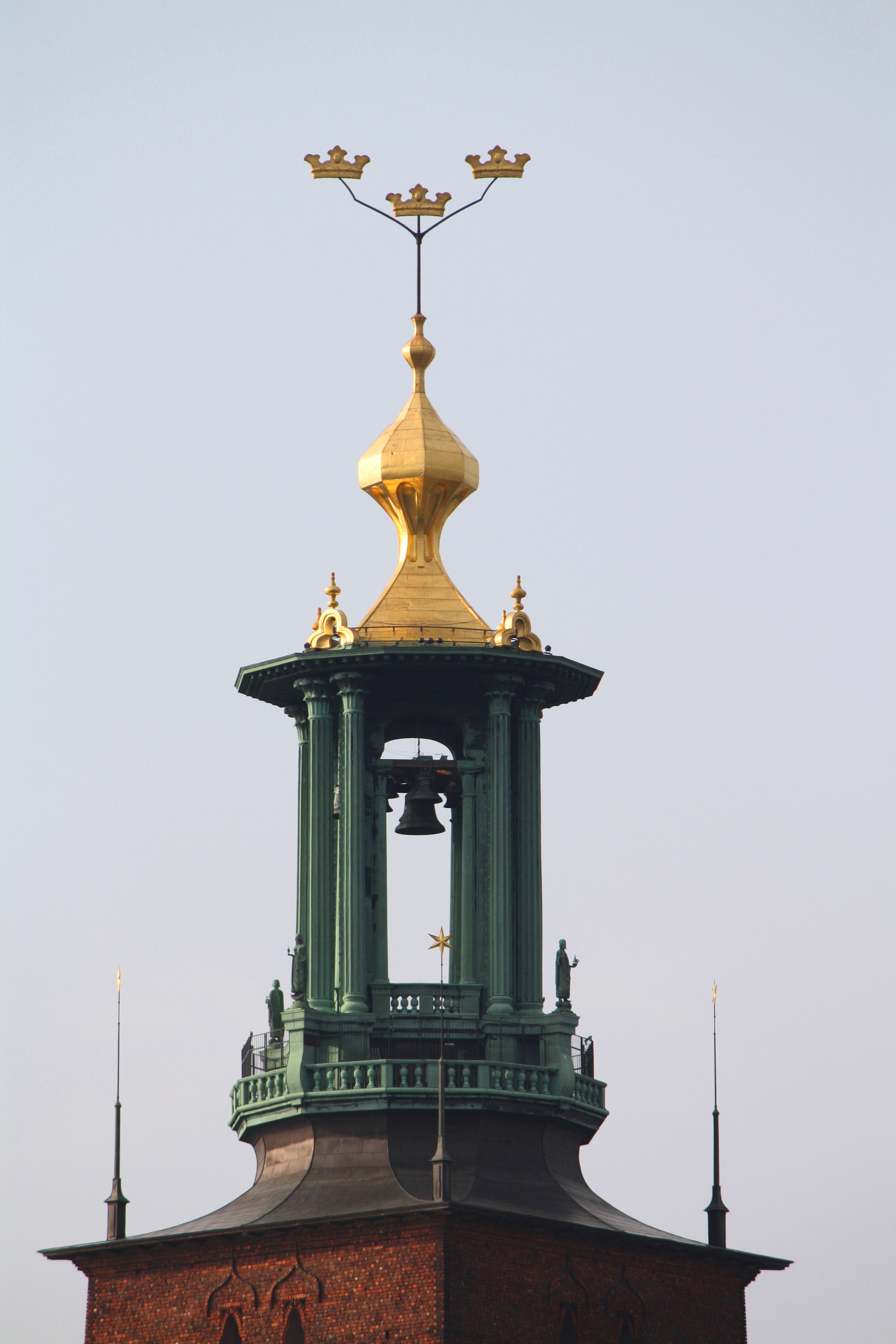
- Upper left: Three Crowns
- Upper right: The Lesser coat of arms of Sweden
- Lower left: Three crowns on Stockholm's City Hall
- Lower right: The Swedish Air Force roundel

Three Crowns (Swedish: tre kronor) is the national emblem of Sweden, present in the coat of arms of Sweden, and composed of three yellow or gilded coronets ordered two above and one below, placed on a blue background. Similar designs are found on a number of other coats of arms or flags.

The emblem is often used as a symbol of official State authority by the Monarchy, the Riksdag, the Government of Sweden and by Swedish embassies around the world, but also appears in other less formal contexts, such as the Sweden men's national ice hockey team, who wear the symbol on their sweaters and hence are called "Three Crowns", and atop the Stockholm City Hall (built 1911–1923). The Three Crowns are also used as the roundel on military aircraft of the Swedish Air Force and as a sign on Swedish military equipment in general, and also on the uniforms and vehicles of the Swedish Police Authority.

== Origins ==
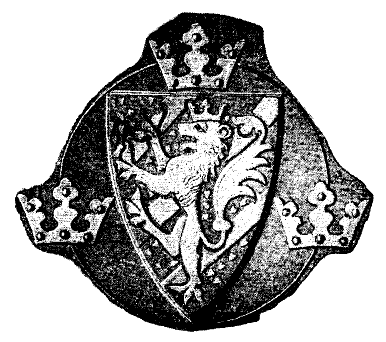
The backside of Magnus Ladulås (1240–1290) seal stamp, showing three crowns around the king's Coat of Arms.

Use of the three crowns as a heraldic symbol of Sweden has been attested, in the encyclopedia Nordisk Familjebok, to the late 13th century, the three crowns first ringing the shield of Magnus Ladulås (1240–1290) and later appearing on the coins of Magnus Eriksson (1316–1374).

One of several traditional explanations have suggested that Albert of Mecklenburg (1338–1412), who ruled Sweden 1364–89, brought the symbol from Germany. This theory has been refuted by later research, namely, the announcement in 1982 of the discovery of a frieze in Avignon in southern France, estimated to date back to 1336. The frieze was painted for an international congress led by the Pope and contains the symbols of all participant countries, including Sweden. This discovery suggests the symbol was introduced no later than by Albrekt's predecessor, Magnus Eriksson (1316–74).

=== Early Swedish heraldry ===
The first coat of arms of Sweden from the 13th century featured a golden lion on a background of wavy blue and white diagonal lines (in blazons, "bendy wavy Argent and azure, a lion Or"). It is still part of the present greater coat of arms of Sweden which is quartered between the lion coat of arms and the three crowns. As the lion and the crowns were occasionally re-interpreted as the coat of arms of the provinces of Götaland and Svealand respectively, the lion was earlier, erroneously, called the "Göta lion".

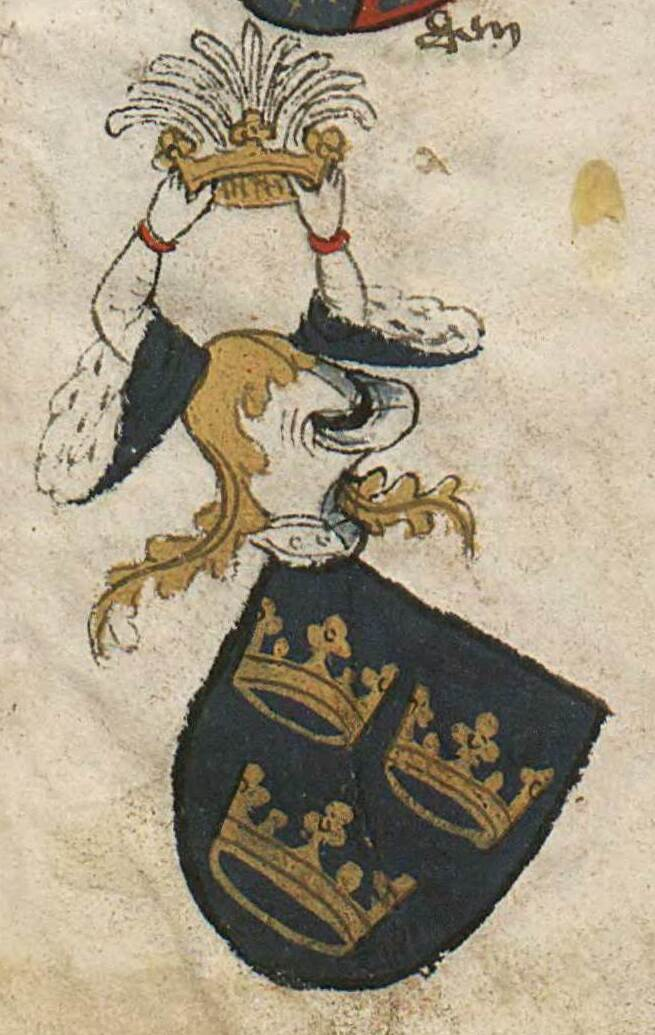
Three crowns coat of arms in Codex Bergshammar (c. 1435)

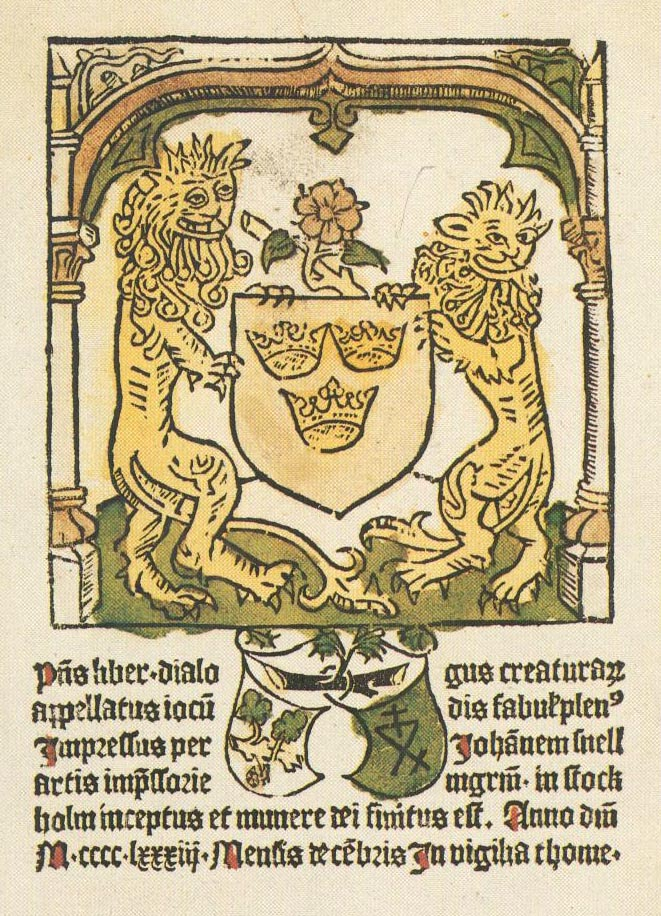
Three crowns coat of arms in Dialogus creaturarum (c. 1487)

== Use by Scandinavian unions ==
=== Union of Magnus Eriksson ===
Magnus used the symbols frequently, probably to mark his three kingdoms: Sweden, Norway and Scania. During the early 14th century, Denmark's severe financial problems caused most of the country to be pawned to German princes, primarily Gerhard III and John III. Since Denmark's king was forced into exile in 1332, the Danish Archbishop in Lund requested that Magnus become king of the Scanian provinces of Denmark. Magnus redeemed the pawn from John III and was sworn in as king of Scania the same year. The earliest known coat of arms featuring three crowns as a symbol of Sweden dates back to the 1330s and appears in a painted frieze in the Cardinal of Bayonne's palace in Avignon.

Although Denmark was reconsolidated under King Valdemar Atterdag in 1340 and regained its territory, and Norway left the union with Sweden in 1380, successive Swedish kings continued to use the union coat of arms with the three crowns. An alternative, less well-supported theory suggests that the three crowns are the three kingdoms in the traditional title of the Swedish king, king of Swedes, Goths and Wends (the two last of which he held in competition with the Danish king). The Swedes-Goths-Wends represent a timely fifteenth-century re-interpretation of the already well-established emblem.

=== Kalmar Union ===
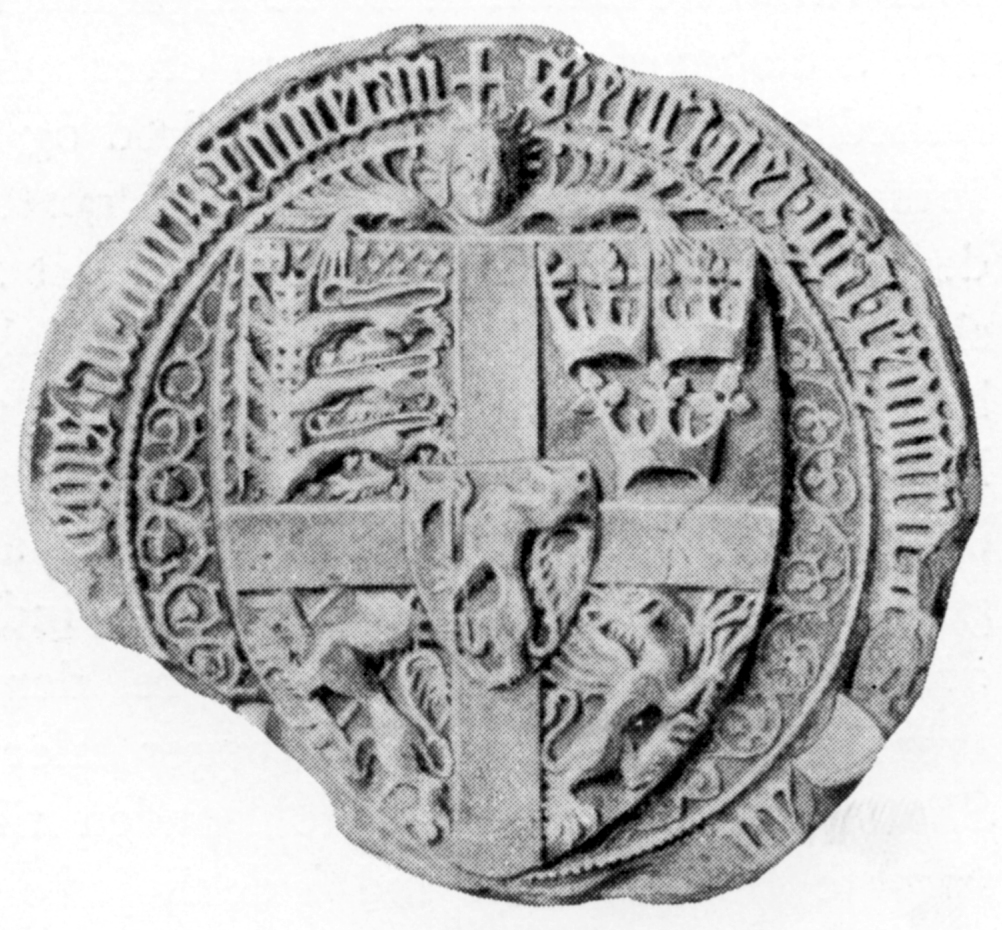
Seal of Erik of Pomerania

When the Kalmar Union, the personal union between Denmark, Norway and Sweden, was instituted by Queen Margrete I in 1397, the three crowns symbol reverted to its use as a symbol of the union of three realms. Her successor, Eric of Pomerania, used a coat of arms quartered between the coats of arms of Denmark (three blue lions on a golden shield), Norway (a golden lion with an axe on a red shield) and Sweden (a golden lion on blue and white wavy stripes) plus the union mark with the three golden crowns on a blue shield, which is also the case for the following union Kings in the 15th century.

== Use in Sweden (post-Kalmar Union) ==
Since the three crowns had been used in Sweden between the unions, both King Karl Knutsson Bonde, who periodically drew Sweden out of the Kalmar Union, and King Gustav Vasa, who terminated it in 1521, used the crowns quartered with the lion as a symbol of Sweden, and this has continued to the present day. Since the 15th century, the crowns have been regarded as the "main" arms of Sweden and thus can be used independently as the lesser coat of arms of the country.

The symbol is known to have been placed atop the central tower of the castle Tre Kronor (Three Crowns) in Stockholm, destroyed by fire in 1697, no later than the early 16th century.

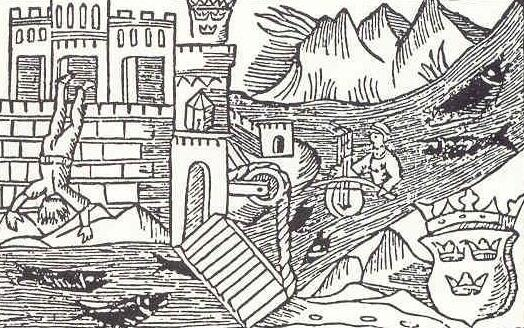
Swedish coat of arms on Olofsborg castle (1555)

The modern Greater Coat of Arms of Sweden

== The Three Crowns conflict ==
In the 1550s, King Gustav Vasa of Sweden found that the Danish King Christian III had added the three crowns to the coat of arms of Denmark. Because the three crowns had been a Swedish symbol since the 14th century and were used by Danish monarchs only during the Kalmar Union, Gustav interpreted Christian III's use of the symbol as a sign of intent to conquer Sweden and resurrect the union. Christian countered that, since the monarchs of the union had used the three crowns, the symbol now belonged to both kingdoms and he had as much a right as the Swedish king to use it.

In Sweden, the Three Crowns were regarded as an exclusively Swedish symbol. This led to a long-lasting diplomatic conflict between the two countries, the so-called Three Crowns Conflict, with Sweden accusing Denmark of imperialism by using a Swedish symbol, and Denmark accusing Sweden of monopolizing the use of a Scandinavian union symbol.

This conflict played a role at the outbreak of the Northern Seven Years' War in 1563. At the beginning of the 17th century the conflict was settled with both countries being allowed to use the Three Crowns in their coats of arms, although in Denmark it had a less prominent place in the shield, and was officially referred to as a heraldic reminder of the former Kalmar Union. Denmark used the Three Crowns in this way from 1546, until they were removed from the new coat of arms that was introduced in 2024.

Coat of arms of Denmark instated by Christian III in the 1550s

Coat of arms of Denmark prior to 2024

== In Arthurian legend ==
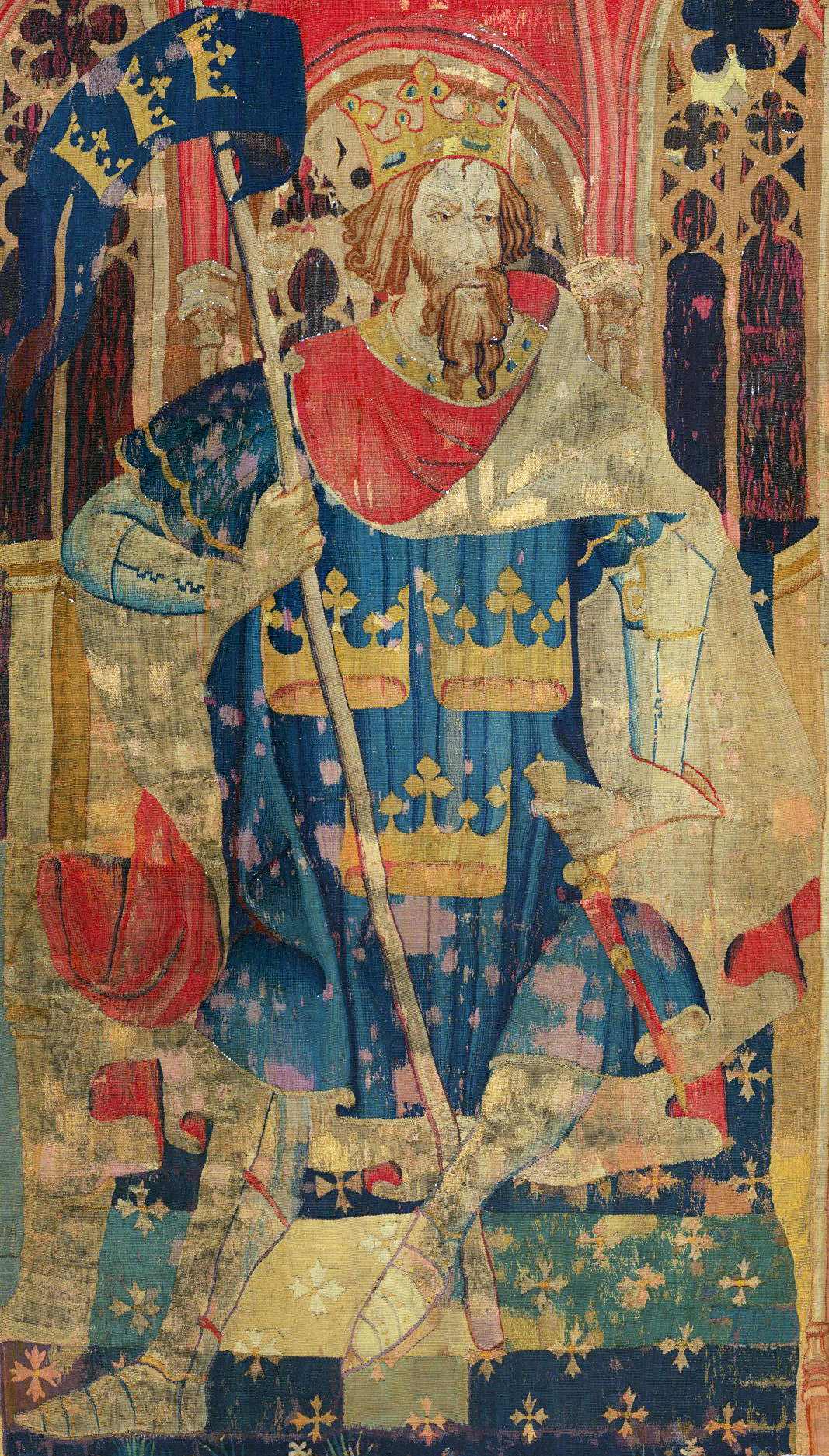
The attributed arms given to King Arthur (left) and Arthur depicted as one of the Nine Worthies, tapestry, c. 1385

Even in the earliest references to Arthur in Medieval Welsh literature, he is named as the holder of the "Three Tribal Thrones of the Island of Britain" in the Trioedd Ynys Prydein (English: The Triads of the Island of Britain). These thrones are found at Mynyw, Celliwig and Pen Rhionydd (associated with Wales, Cornwall and Scotland respectively). However the Welsh sources do not mention Arthur displaying three thrones or three crowns. Instead, the 9th-century Welsh cleric Nennius described the king as displaying the image of The Virgin Mary, while the 10th-century Annales Cambriae (English Annals of Wales) states that Arthur carried the "Cross of Jesus Christ" at the Battle of Badon Hill. Geoffrey of Monmouth again describes Arthur as carrying the image of the Virgin Mary upon his shield, but adds that he used a Welsh Dragon on both his helmet and standard.

By the 11th and 12th centuries Arthur and his knights had become a popular subject across Europe thanks to the work of popular authors such as Geoffrey and Chrétien de Troyes. As such, Arthur would often be depicted in manuscripts and artwork with different attributed arms, but from the 13th century onwards, was most commonly given three gold crowns on an azure field. There are numerous illustrations of Arthur with three crowns upon his shield in the early 14th century, suggesting that the popular understanding of the three crowns as an King Arthur's standard was widespread by that time. In 1310, Jacques de Longuyon wrote the Voeux du Paon ("Vows of the Peacock"), which included a list of nine famous leaders. These leaders would become known across European art and literature as the Nine Worthies, with each being given a full coat of arms. A 1394 manuscript depicting the Nine Worthies shows Arthur holding a flag with three gold crowns.

Dr Paul A. Fox noted the adoption of the three crowns to represent King Arthur is contemporaneous with King Magnus' adoption of the motif in Sweden. As such, Fox has stated that while the adoption of the symbols was "too close indeed to say whether the one might have influenced the other", the readoption of the Swedish crowns after 1363 "cannot have been ignorant of the fact that these were by then well established as King Arthur’s own".

== Other three crowns in European armory ==
Some heraldic displays outside of Sweden also incorporate triple crown designs. Some of the notable of these uses are discussed below.

=== In Central and Eastern European armory ===
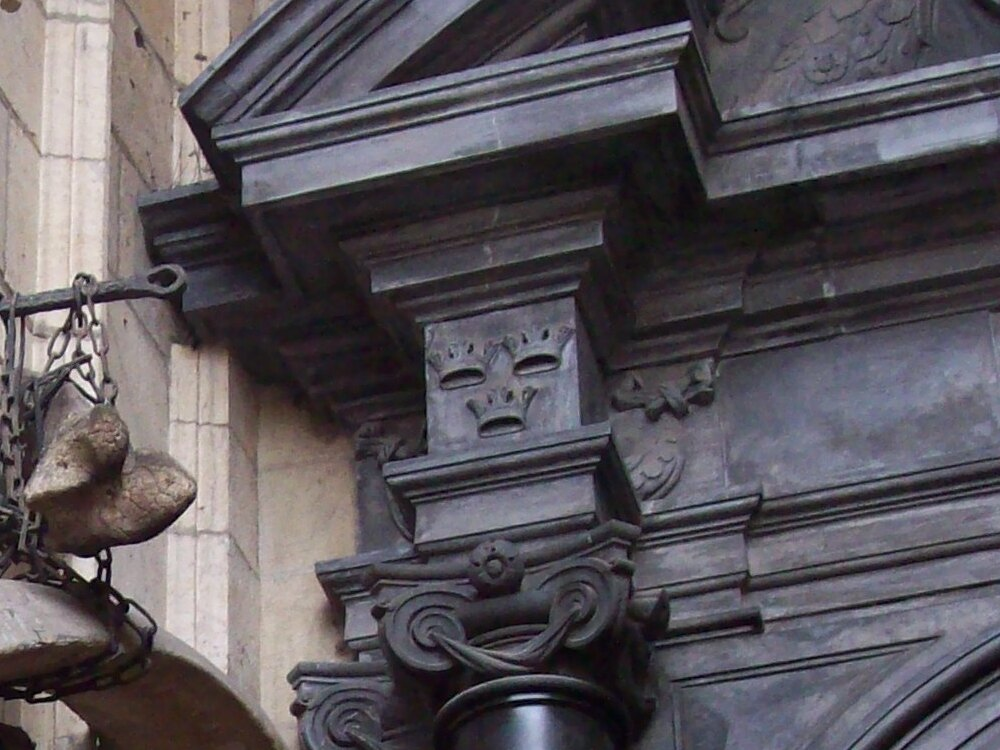
Three crowns on the Wawel Cathedral, Poland

Flag of Vyborg (Russia), featuring three crowns

The historical region of Galicia, now divided between Poland and Ukraine, had under Austro-Hungarian rule as its coat-of-arms a blue shield with three gold crowns as part of the design. The crowns are said to represent Lodomeria, a historical province that was united with Galicia, while Galicia itself was represented by the black crow. The Coat of arms of the Wawel Cathedral Chapter features three crowns; specifically stated as "three crowns on a dark-blue background, as was also the case during old-Polish times".

Three crowns in Polish armory

Galicia

Kingdom of Galicia and Lodomeria

Wawel Cathedral Chapter

Pabianice

Iłża

Gmina Iłża

Gmina Żarnowiec

Krynica-Zdrój

Duchy of Zator

Padew Narodowa

=== In French and German armory ===
The emblem of Henry III of France was "Manet ultima coelo" with three crowns.

The French Caribbean island of Saint Barthélemy was a Swedish colony between 1784 and 1878, and the island's coat of arms includes the three crowns as part of the design.

The German towns of Otterfing and Tegernsee in Bavaria use the three gold crowns on blue design on their coats-of-arms.

Coat of arms of Saint Barthélemy

Coat of arms of Otterfing

Coat of arms of Tegernsee

=== In Irish armory ===
Flag of Munster, Ireland

Practically identical to the three crowns of Sweden is that of the coat of arms and flag of the Province of Munster, a region in the southwest of Ireland. Like the Swedish model, it comprises two crowns above and one below. These represent the three great duchies of the province, Desmond, Ormond and Thomond. The design was used as the flag of the Lordship of Ireland between 1171–1541 following the Norman invasion of Ireland until being replaced by the flag of the Kingdom of Ireland.

=== In English armory ===
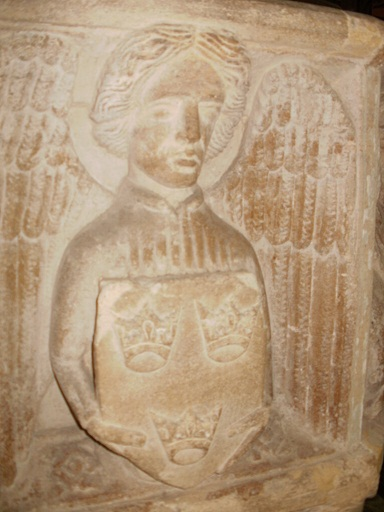
Three crowns emblem at Saxmundham parish church, Suffolk, England

Flag of East Anglia

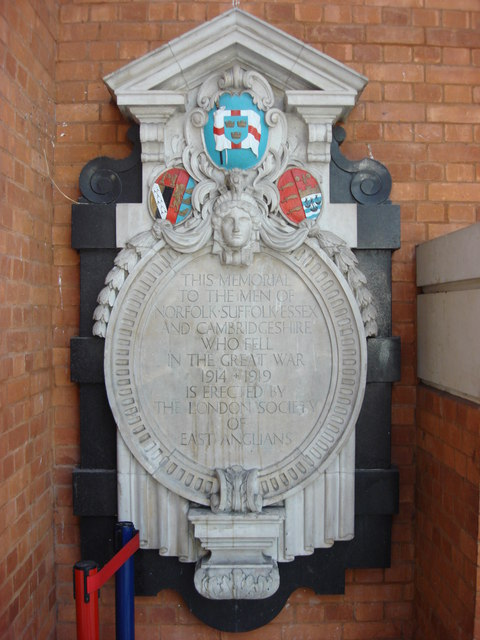
Memorial to East Anglians who died during the First World War in Liverpool Street Station. The memorial, erected by the London Society of East Anglians, displays the flag

A shield of three golden crowns, placed two above one, on a blue background, has been used a symbol of East Anglia for centuries. The coat of arms was ascribed by mediaeval heralds to the Anglo-Saxon Kingdom of East Anglia and the Wuffingas dynasty which ruled it. The flag of the East Anglian king and saint, Edmund the Martyr consists of three gold crowns on a field of blue (Azure, three crowns Or), The East Anglian flag as it is known today was proposed by George Henry Langham and adopted in 1902 by the London Society of East Anglians (established in 1896). It superimposes the three crowns in a blue shield on a Saint George's Cross.

The three crowns appear, carved in stone, on the baptismal font (c.1400) in the parish church of Saxmundham, and on the 15th century porch of Woolpit church, both in Suffolk.

The emblem of three crowns is evident in East Anglian local heraldry; they appear in the arms of the diocese of Ely and the borough of Bury St Edmunds where the crowns are shown pierced with arrows to represent the martyrdom of St. Edmund. They were also included in the arms of the former Isle of Ely County Council, the Borough of Colchester and the University of East Anglia.

A three crowns design is the coat of arms of the city of Kingston upon Hull, a large port in Yorkshire, but this design sees the three crowns stacked vertically and relates back to the Royal charter of 1299. The emblem is used by the city council and the city's two rugby league teams.

The University of Oxford uses as its arms the three gold crowns on blue accompanied by an open book. The origin of the three crowns is not exactly known but may refer to the arms of Thomas Cranley, Chancellor of the University of Oxford in 1390.

Two dioceses of the Church of England use the three crowns emblem; Ely (gules three ducal coronets two over one or) and Bristol (sable three crowns arranged in pale or, similar to the city of Hull).

The first corporate coat of arms was granted in 1439 to the Drapers' Company in London with three triple crowns. Three crowns also form the logo of Coutts, the London-based private bankers, but in this case the design comprises one crown at the top, with two below.

=== In Scottish armory ===
Coat of arms of the chief of the Clan Arthur

The coat of arms of the chief of Clan Grant displays the three gold crowns on a red background (gules, three ancient crowns or). Earlier it is recorded to have been three gold crowns on a blue background (azure, three crowns or). The Grant arms formed the basis of the arms of the burgh of Grantown-on-Spey, which was founded on the clan's land in 1765.

The coat of arms of the chief of Clan Arthur (or Clan MacArthur) uses the three gold crowns on blue (azure, three antique crowns or).

=== In Spanish armory ===
The three gold crowns on blue design appears on the coat of arms of the Spanish city of Burriana in the Valencian Community, but, like Coutts & Co, is arranged one over two instead of two over one. The crowns here refer to the fact that in 1901, the Queen Regent of Spain, Maria Christina of Austria, gave the town the title of city, and was crowned three times.

The Coat of arms of Lima, capital of the Spanish Viceroyalty of Peru, features three crowns. It was granted to the city in 1537 by Charles V, Holy Roman Emperor and king of the Hispanic Monarchy (as Charles I).

Coat of arms of Burriana

Coat of arms of Lima

== In modern trade marks ==
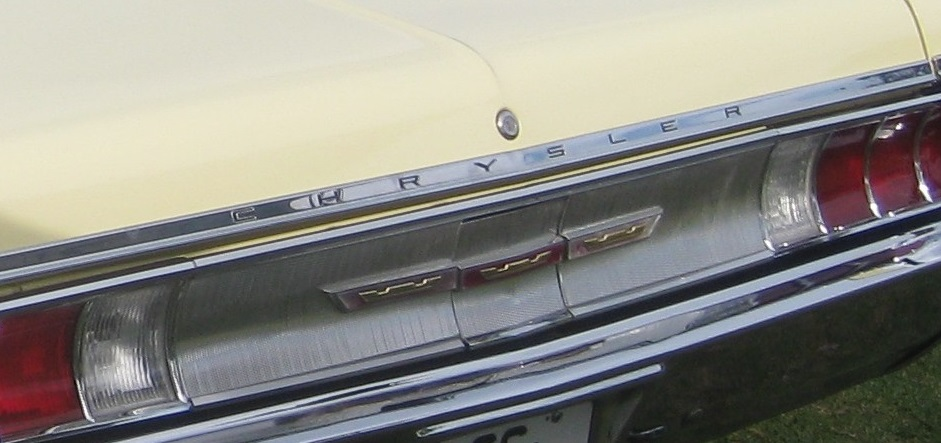
A detail of a 1965 Chrysler New Yorker, showing the three crown symbol on its rear.

A symbol with three crowns was used by Chrysler on some of its New Yorker models in the 1960s. A symbol for the marque's top model, the crowns were placed in a row on the vehicle rear and over each other in the front. During the 1980s and 1990s, Broderbund Software used a stylised variant of the symbol.

== See also ==
- Gustavus Adolphus College
- Mother Svea
- Flag of Sweden
- University of Oxford
- Three Crowns Castle
- Trekroner Fort
- Triple Crown
