= Bad Tölz-Wolfratshausen – Miesbach =

Constituency for the elections to the 19th German Bundestag 2017

222 Bad Tölz-Wolfratshausen – Miesbach
- Electoral district for the Bundestag
- Bad Tölz-Wolfratshausen – Miesbach in 2025
- State: Bavaria
- Population: 227,900 (2019)
- Electorate: 165,905 (2025)
- Major settlements: Geretsried; Bad Tölz; Wolfratshausen
- Area: 1,976.9 km^{2}

Current electoral district
- Created: 2017
- Party: CSU
- Member: Alexander Radwan
- Elected: 2017, 2021, 2025

Bad Tölz-Wolfratshausen – Miesbach is an electoral constituency (German: Wahlkreis) represented in the Bundestag. It elects one member via first-past-the-post voting. Under the current constituency numbering system, it is designated as constituency 222. It is located in southern Bavaria, comprising the districts of Bad Tölz-Wolfratshausen and Miesbach.

Bad Tölz-Wolfratshausen – Miesbach was created for the 2017 federal election. Since 2017, it has been represented by Alexander Radwan of the Christian Social Union (CSU).

== Geography ==
Bad Tölz-Wolfratshausen – Miesbach is located in southern Bavaria. As of the 2021 federal election, it comprises the districts of Bad Tölz-Wolfratshausen and Miesbach.

== History ==
Bad Tölz-Wolfratshausen – Miesbach was created in 2017 and contained parts of the reconfigured constituency of Starnberg.

In the 2017 and 2021 elections, it was number 223. From the 2025 election, it has been number 222. Its borders have not changed since its creation.

== Members ==
Alexander Radwan of the Christian Social Union (CSU) was elected in 2017, and re-elected in 2021 and 2025.

Election	Member	Party	%
2017	Alexander Radwan	CSU	47.6
2021	Alexander Radwan	CSU	41.3
2025	Alexander Radwan	CSU	46.4

== Election results ==
=== 2025 election ===
Federal election (2025): Bad Tölz-Wolfratshausen – Miesbach
Notes:	Blue background denotes the winner of the electorate vote. Pink background denotes a candidate elected from their party list. Yellow background denotes an electorate win by a list member, or other incumbent. A ✓ or ✗ denotes status of any incumbent, win or lose respectively.						
Party	Candidate	Votes	%	±%	Party votes	%	±%
CSU	✓ Alexander Radwan	65,482	46.4	▲5.1	59,231	41.9	▲7.7
AfD	Dr. Ingo Jochen Hahn	23,293	16.5		24,280	17.2	▲9.2
Greens	Karl Bär	20,820	14.8	▼0.8	17,584	12.4	▼1.0
SPD	Raffael Joos	10,901	7.7	▼3.8	12,829	9.1	▼4.4
FW	Felix Leipold	7,225	5.1	▼5.4	6,309	4.5	▼4.8
FDP	Tim Michael Sachs	4,754	3.4	▼5.3	7,507	5.3	▼7.3
Left	Erich Horst Utz	4,695	3.3	▲1.4	5,717	4.0	▲1.9
BSW					3,863	2.7	
APT					930	0.7	▼0.3
BP	Marinus Thurnhuber	1,602	1.1	▼2.6	547	0.4	▼0.5
ÖDP	Manuel Tessun	1,271	0.9	▼0.6	597	0.4	▼0.4
Volt	Gerald Nowitzky	1,107	0.8		766	0.5	▲0.3
PARTEI					539	0.4	▼0.3
dieBasis					512	0.4	▼1.9
BD					104	0.1	
Humanists					62	0.0	Steady
MLPD					21	0.0	Steady
Informal votes		716			468		
Total valid votes		141,150			141,398		
Turnout		141,866	85.5	▲3.8			
CSU hold	Majority	42,189	29.9	▲4.1			

=== 2021 election ===
Federal election (2021): Bad Tölz-Wolfratshausen – Miesbach
Notes:	Blue background denotes the winner of the electorate vote. Pink background denotes a candidate elected from their party list. Yellow background denotes an electorate win by a list member, or other incumbent. A ✓ or ✗ denotes status of any incumbent, win or lose respectively.						
Party	Candidate	Votes	%	±%	Party votes	%	±%
CSU	✓ Alexander Radwan	55,501	41.3	▼6.3	46,304	34.2	▼7.4
Greens	Karl Bär	20,829	15.5	▲2.0	18,138	13.4	▲3.1
SPD	Hannes Gräbner	15,428	11.5	▲0.2	18,276	13.5	▲2.5
FW	Christian Kaul	14,146	10.5		12,531	9.3	▲6.6
FDP	Béatrice Vesterling	11,636	8.7	▲0.5	17,048	12.6	▲0.2
AfD					10,835	8.0	▼3.7
dieBasis	Susanne Ehlers	5,140	3.8		2,996	2.2	
BP	Marinus Thurnhuber	4,992	3.7	▼0.5	1,197	0.9	▼1.2
Left	Erich Utz	2,643	2.0	▼3.3	2,908	2.1	▼2.8
Tierschutzpartei					1,265	0.9	▲0.1
ÖDP	Jan-Philipp van Olfen	2,077	1.5		1,076	0.8	0.0
PARTEI	Florian Merkl	1,949	1.5		918	0.7	▲0.2
Pirates					398	0.3	0.0
Team Todenhöfer					323	0.2	
Volt					308	0.2	
Unabhängige					176	0.1	
Gesundheitsforschung					129	0.1	0.0
V-Partei3					128	0.1	▼0.1
Humanists					100	0.1	
du.					78	0.1	
NPD					67	0.0	▼0.1
Bündnis C					49	0.0	
The III. Path					41	0.0	
LKR					27	0.0	
MLPD					26	0.0	0.0
DKP					14	0.0	0.0
Informal votes		1,765			750		
Total valid votes		134,341			135,356		
Turnout		136,106	81.7	▲1.6			
CSU hold	Majority	34,672	25.8	▼8.2			

=== 2017 election ===
Federal election (2017): Bad Tölz-Wolfratshausen – Miesbach
Notes:	Blue background denotes the winner of the electorate vote. Pink background denotes a candidate elected from their party list. Yellow background denotes an electorate win by a list member, or other incumbent. A ✓ or ✗ denotes status of any incumbent, win or lose respectively.						
Party	Candidate	Votes	%	±%	Party votes	%	±%
CSU	Alexander Radwan	62,465	47.6	▼8.8	54,786	41.6	▼12.3
Greens	Karl Bär	17,786	13.6	▲5.6	13,605	10.3	▲2.4
SPD	Hannes Gräbner	14,792	11.3	▼5.9	14,457	11.0	▼3.4
AfD	Constantin Prinz von Anhalt Dessau	13,025	9.9		15,391	11.7	▲5.9
FDP	Friedrich Haugg	10,702	8.2	▲3.0	16,343	12.4	▲6.5
Left	Andreas Wagner	6,922	5.3	▲2.3	6,486	4.9	▲2.3
FW					3,459	2.6	▼0.5
BP	Maximilian Stocker	5,562	4.2		2,710	2.1	▲0.4
Tierschutzpartei					1,142	0.9	▲0.2
ÖDP					1,063	0.8	▼0.3
PARTEI					629	0.5	
Pirates					412	0.3	▼1.1
DiB					276	0.2	
DM					259	0.2	
NPD					213	0.2	▼0.3
V-Partei³					195	0.1	
BGE					182	0.1	
Gesundheitsforschung					158	0.1	
BüSo					22	0.0	0.0
MLPD					19	0.0	0.0
DKP					10	0.0	
Informal votes		1,358			795		
Total valid votes		131,254			131,817		
Turnout		132,612	80.1	▲7.7			
CSU win new seat	Majority	44,679	34.0				
