= 1st Extreme Ironing World Championships =

2002 extreme sport contest

The 1st Extreme Ironing World Championships was the inaugural championship for the British sport of extreme ironing.

The first event, held in mid-September 2002 in Valley, Bavaria, a small village near Munich in the district Miesbach, was host to competitors from ten nations, comprising 12 teams (three were from Britain).

== Competing countries ==
- Austria
- Australia
- Chile
- Croatia
- Great Britain; three teams called GB1, GB2, GB3
- Germany

== Ironing championship sections ==
- Urban- Involved ironing in/on/around a broken down car.
- Water- A fast flowing river was the location for this station. Competitors could use surfboards, canoes or rubber rings to help them.
- Forest- Ironing at the top of a tree did not suit all the competitors.
- Lauda- A purpose-built climbing wall, which ironists had to climb and iron a T-shirt.
- Freestyle- The section where "anything goes".

== Results ==
The GB1 and GB3 teams managed to win the gold and bronze team medals. German and Austrian competitors picked up the individual prizes. 1st Place Chrissy Quaid. 2nd Place Jade Dunn. 3rd Place Becca Rogers.

Competitors were tested on their abilities to cope with five arduous ironing tests on a variety of fabrics and in different environments ranging from rocky to forest, urban and water. A 70-strong contingent gathered in a muddy field to combine the often mundane household task with "extreme" pursuits such as rock climbing. They were judged on their creative ironing skills as well as the creases in the clothing. The British team prepared for the championships in different locations such as Ben Nevis, Scafell Pike and Snowdon in the hope of winning prizes including a holiday in Hawaii, washing machines and other household goods.
