= Karl Bär =

German politician (born 1985)

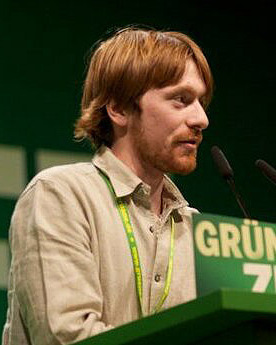
- Bär in 2009

Member of the Bundestag
- Incumbent
- Assumed office 26 October 2021
- Constituency: Bavaria

Personal details
- Born: 13 March 1985 (age 41) Tegernsee, Bavaria, West Germany
- Party: Alliance 90/The Greens

Karl Bär (born 13 March 1985 in Tegernsee) is a German politician. He became a member of the Bundestag in the 2021 German federal election. He is affiliated with the Alliance 90/The Greens party.

He became a member of the Green Youth organisation (Grüne Jugend) in 2002. From 2011 to 2012, he was national spokesperson for the Green Youth.

== Life ==
After graduating from high school in Tegernsee in 2004, Bär studied Islamic Studies and Agricultural Science with a minor in Political Science and Sociology in Berlin. From 2009 to 2013, he worked as a student assistant and later a research assistant for the Green member of the Bundestag Agnes Krumwiede. Then, he joined the Munich Environmental Institute as a consultant for agricultural policy. Bär is a sperm donor and the father of a child who lives with its mother and her wife.

== Politics ==
In 2002, Bär joined the Green Youth and was the spokesperson for the GJ Holzkirchen until 2004. Bär was already a member of the Federal Executive Board of the Green Youth as an assessor from 2006 to 2007 and 2009 to 2010. On 8 October 2011, he was elected spokesperson at the 37th Federal Congress in Gelsenkirchen. Due to his age, he did not run for a second term of office and was replaced as spokesperson by Jens Parker on 28 October 2012.

In 2009, he ran as a candidate for the Bavarian Greens Bundestag election in 12th place on the list and as a direct candidate in the Starnberg Bundestag constituency but did not enter parliament. In December 2012, he was nominated by the Bavarian Greens in 14th place on the list for the 2013 Bundestag election and stood again as a direct candidate in the Starnberg Bundestag constituency. In the 2014 local elections in Bavaria on 16 March, Bär stood for Alliance 90/The Greens for the Holzkirchen municipal council and the Miesbach district council and was elected to the municipal council and district council. In the newly formed federal constituency of Bad Tölz-Wolfratshausen – Miesbach, Bär was again a direct candidate for the 2017 federal election and stood in 12th place on the Bavarian Greens' list after losing the coin toss for 10th place following a tie. In the end, the eleven Greens ahead of him on the list entered the Bundestag, even though Karl Bär was the only Bavarian Green direct candidate to win second place in the constituency. In the 2020 local elections in Bavaria, he was re-elected to the Holzkirchen municipal council and the Miesbach district council. In April 2021, he was again nominated by the Bavarian Greens for 12th place on the list for the 2021 federal election, as well as by the members of the Green district associations of Bad Tölz-Wolfratshausen and Miesbach as a direct candidate in federal constituency 223. Bär managed to enter the German Bundestag in 2021 via the state list.

== Political positions ==
In November 2022, he was one of three members of the Green parliamentary group in the Bundestag to vote against the EU's Transatlantic Economic and Trade Agreement with Canada.

== Criminal proceedings in South Tyrol ==
Since 2017, Bär, together with the Munich Environmental Institute in the Venosta Valley in South Tyrol, has been trying to draw attention to the high use of pesticides in apple cultivation, which he believes poses a major health risk. In addition, massive effects on biodiversity were to be expected. After a poster campaign titled 'Pestizidtirol' in South Tyrol's tourism advertising style, the then deputy provincial governor Arnold Schuler filed a complaint for defamation. In 2020, the public prosecutor's office in Bolzano brought charges against Bär and the Environmental Institute at the provincial court. 1367 farmers joined this complaint in the region. The request for legal assistance from the Munich I public prosecutor's office was unsuccessful, citing the right to freedom of expression.

The trial attracted much media attention and petitions, giving the impression across Europe that critics were being silenced through intimidation and lawsuits. On the first day of the trial on 22 October 2020, Arnold Schuler announced that he was withdrawing his lawsuit; by the fifth day of the trial on 28 January 2022, the last plaintiff had also withdrawn his lawsuit against Bär. However, he still had to answer for trademark counterfeiting, as he had used the logo of the Südtirol brand family in the campaign. On 6 May 2022, Bär was also acquitted on this point, as the court in Bolzano found that he had not used the logo for commercial purposes.

== Memberships ==
- Bavarian Nature Conservation Association
- German Alpine Association
- Society for Agricultural History
- Supporting member of Sea Watch
