= Horse market (Munich) =

Horse market in Munich

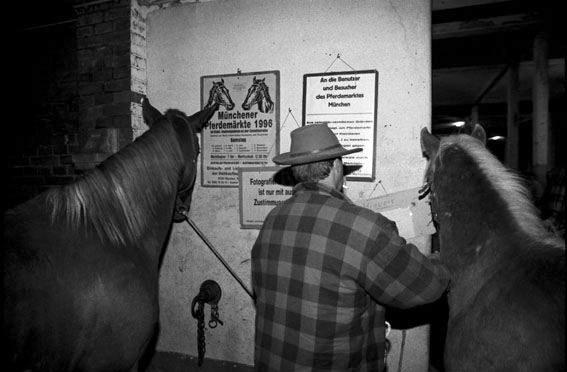
The Munich horse market (1996)

The Munich horse market is a historical horse sale in Munich, Bavaria. Started in 1883, the market took place in the Schmellerhalle, on the edge of the then newly built halls of the Munich slaughterhouse, originally twice a week under the name Rossmarkt. Today the market is held near Ingolstadt.

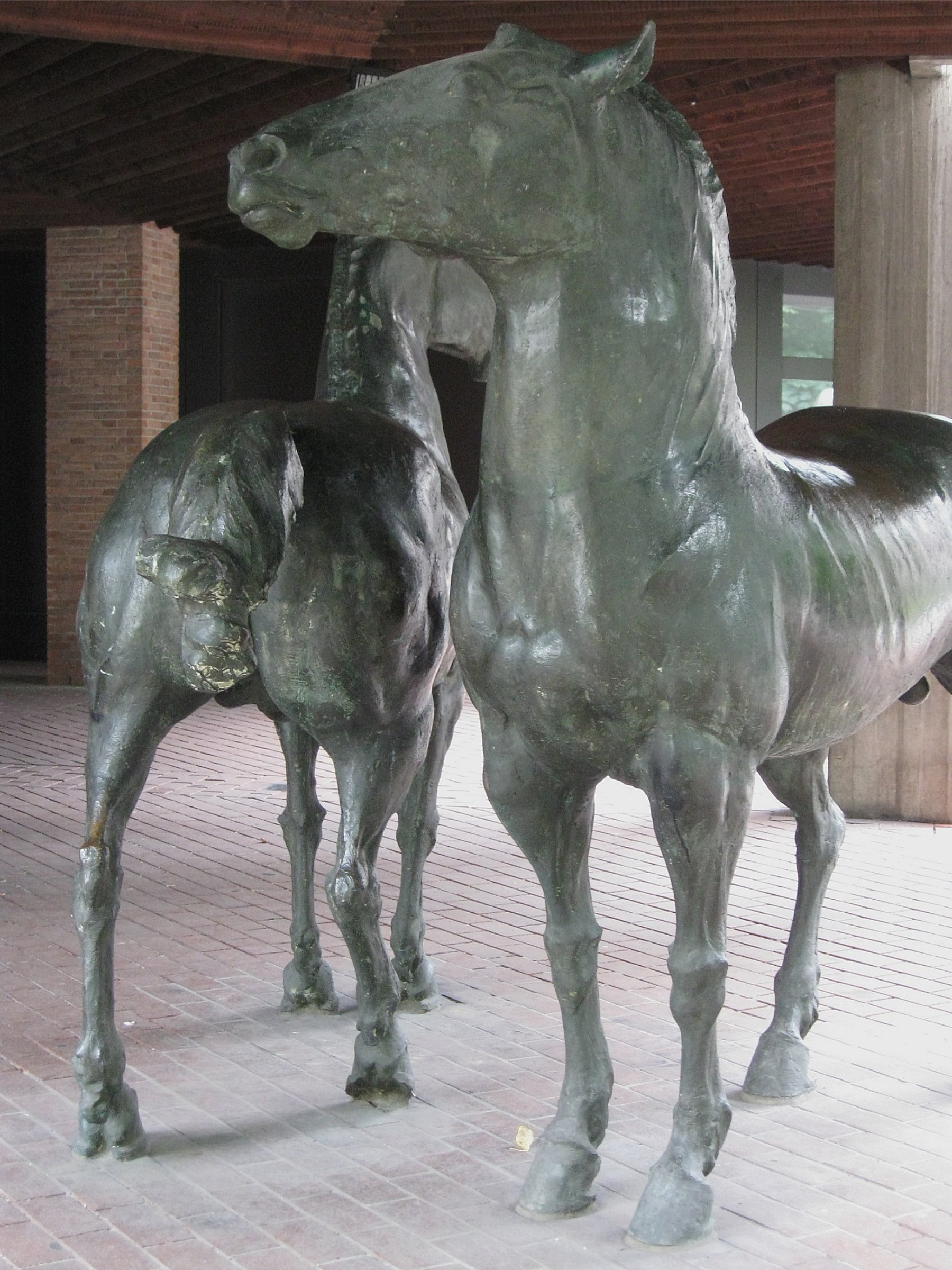
Zwei Pferde, bronze by Claus Nageler to commemorate the site of the horse market.

== Move from Schmellerhalle ==
Since the 1970s, the horse market was held on the first Saturday of the month. At the end of 1972, the horse market had to move from the Schmellerhalle to the cattle yard hall because the land owner, the City of Munich, sold the Schmeller site. Apartments were built on the site. A statue, Zwei Pferde by German artist Claus Nageler was installed to commemorate the site of the old market.

In December 2006 the last Munich horse market took place. The hall, which was in danger of collapsing, was demolished. The organizer, the purchasing and delivery cooperative of the cattle merchants Bayerns eG, moved the horse market to the Oberlandhalle in Miesbach.

== Move to Miesbach ==
From 2014 to December 2015, the market took place in the new Oberlandhalle in Miesbach.

As the conditions in the new Oberlandhalle in Miesbach deteriorated, the organizer moved the horse market to Ingolstadt. The date of the first Ingolstadt horse market was set for February 6, 2016.

== Transfer to Ingolstadt ==
In Ingolstadt, the horse market takes place every first Saturday of the month, with a few exceptions. Horse dealers from all over Bavaria offer their horses. In the catering trade, horse sausages and horse meat were offered. At times, small animals (rabbits, hares, chickens, etc.) were also sold.

== Gallery ==
Scenes from the Munich horse market in 1996:

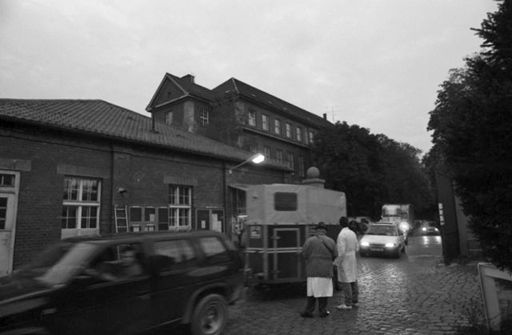
Delivery from 5.00 a.m.

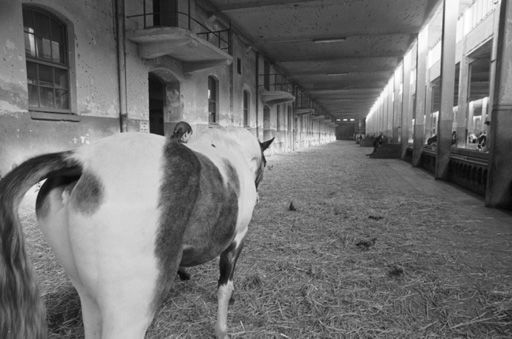
Racetrack in the hall

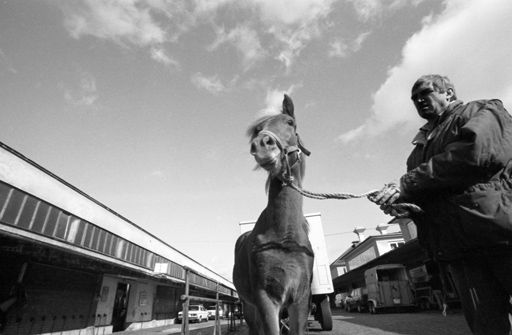
Dealer in front of the hall

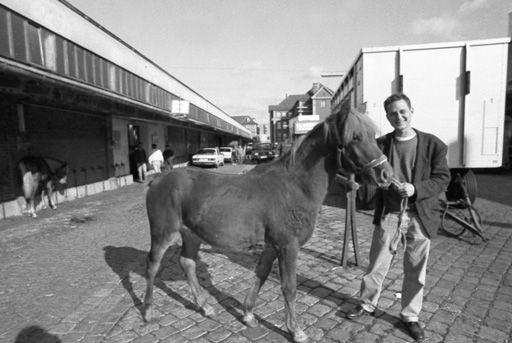
End of market at noon

Scenes from the horse market (Neue Oberlandhalle) 2015:

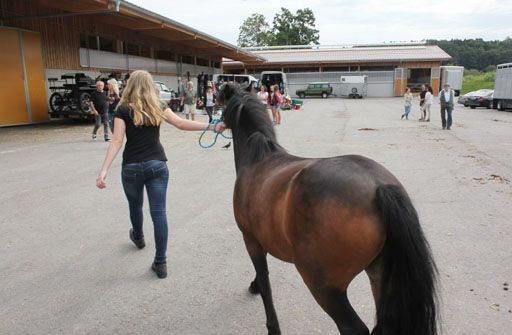

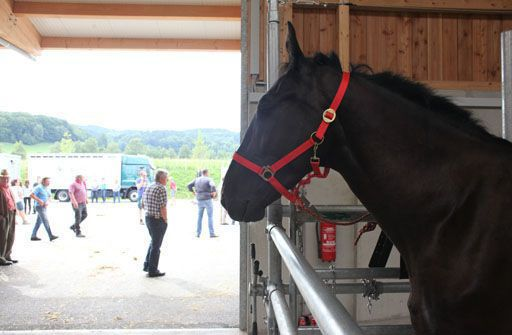

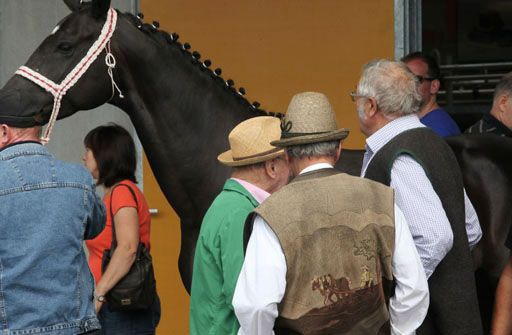

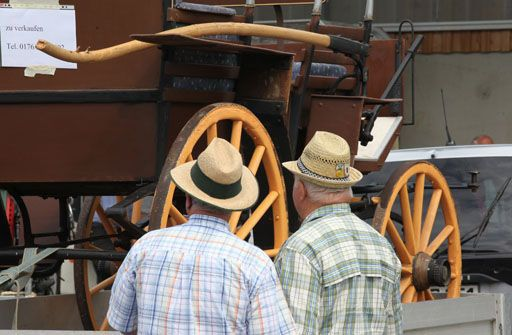
