= Irschenberg =

- Municipality
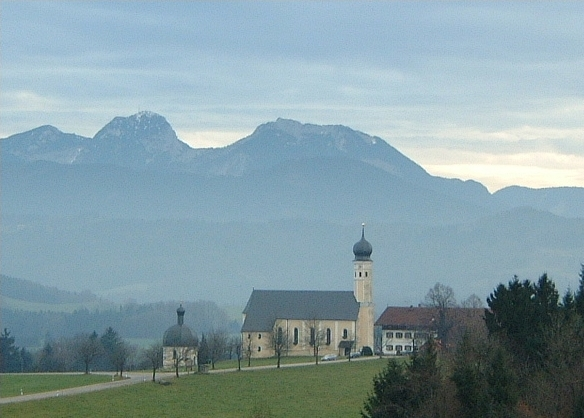
- Pilgrimage church in Wilparting

- Coat of arms

- Location of Irschenberg within Miesbach district
- Interactive map of Irschenberg
- Location within Germany Location within Bavaria
- Coordinates: 47°50′N 11°55′E
- Country: Germany
- State: Bavaria
- Admin. region: Oberbayern
- District: Miesbach

Government
  - Mayor (2019–25): Klaus Meixner

Area
  - Total: 53.94 km^{2} (20.83 sq mi)
- Elevation: 731 m (2,398 ft)

Population (2025-12-31)
  - Total: 3,280
  - Density: 60.8/km^{2} (157/sq mi)
- Time zone: UTC+01:00 (CET)
  - Summer (DST): UTC+02:00 (CEST)
- Postal codes: 83737
- Dialling codes: 08062, 08025, 08064, 08020
- Vehicle registration: MB
- Website: www.irschenberg.de

Irschenberg is a municipality in the district of Miesbach in the German state of Bavaria, about 46 km (29 mi) southeast of Munich. It consists of numerous hamlets situated on the Irschenberg hill range.

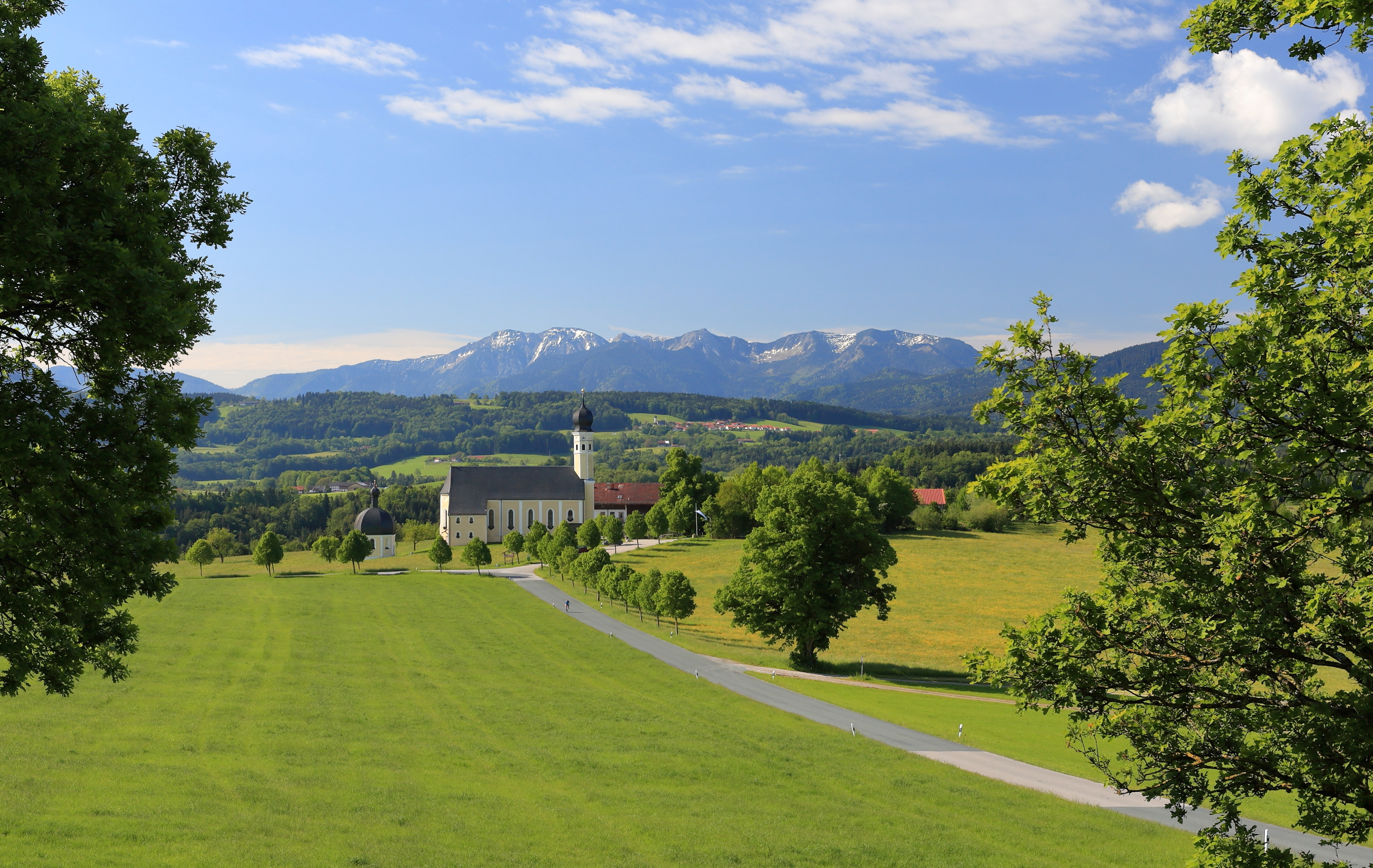
St. Marinus und Anian in spring

The hill is a notorious ascent of the Bundesautobahn 8 motorway running from Munich to Salzburg laid out from 1934 on. A rest area and a motel were attached in 1951.

The name was formerly rendered as "Irish mountain", referring to the monk Marinus, who settled in the area in the course of the Hiberno-Scottish mission under Pope Eugene I and, according to legend, about 697 was martyred by burning at the stake (see the coat of arms). His grave is marked by the pilgrimage church of Wilparting, visible from the motorway and a popular photo scene. Actually Irschen may stem from ursus ("bear").

Originally a part of the Bishopric of Freising, the area fell into possession of the Lords of Hohenwaldeck at Miesbach until their county was incorporated into the Bavarian Electorate in 1734.

== See also ==
- Die Scheinheiligen (film)
