= Warngau =

- Municipality
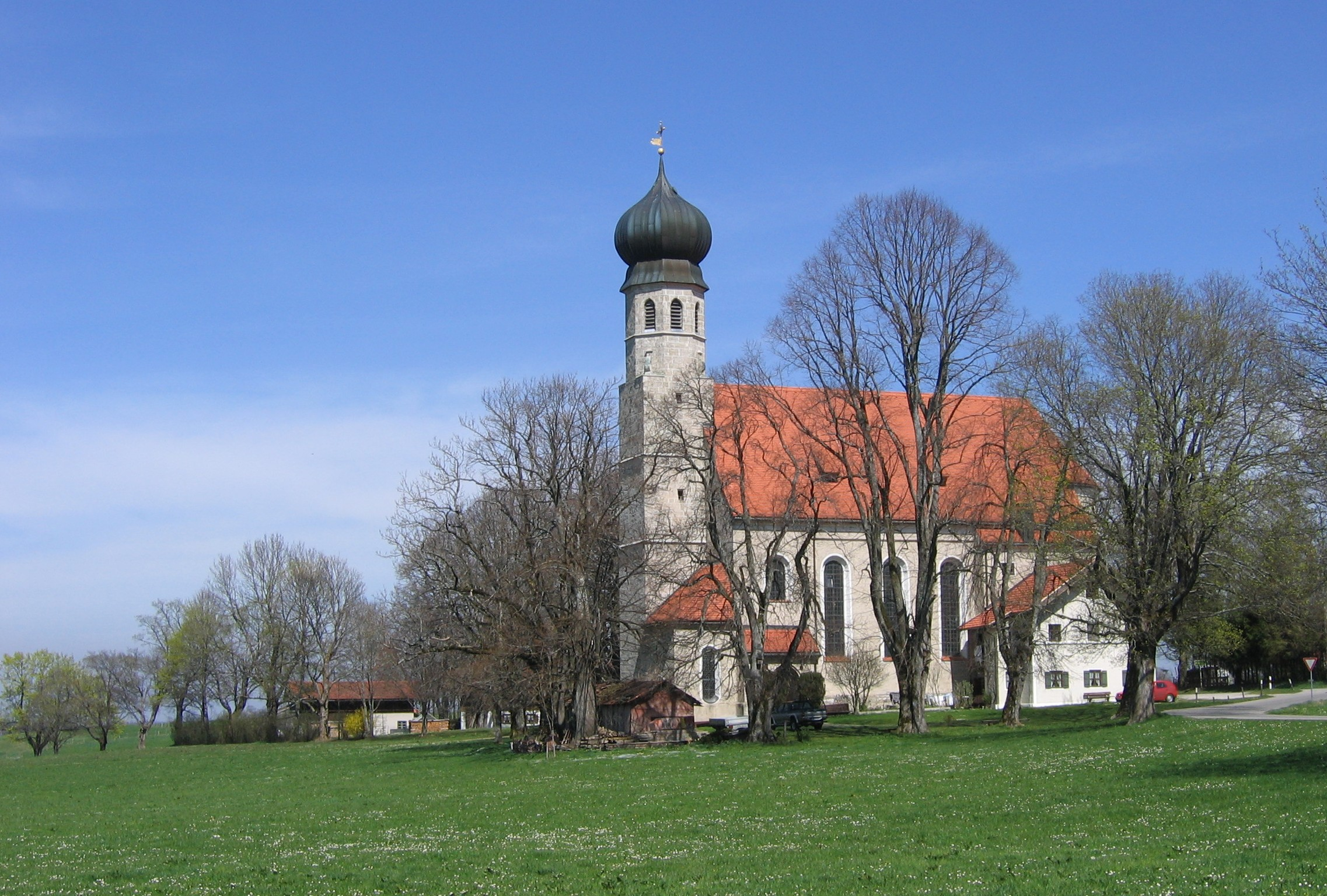
- The All Saints Church

- Coat of arms

- Location of Warngau within Miesbach district
- Interactive map of Warngau
- Location within Germany Location within Bavaria
- Coordinates: 47°50′N 11°44′E
- Country: Germany
- State: Bavaria
- Admin. region: Oberbayern
- District: Miesbach
- Subdivisions: 81 Ortsteile

Government
  - Mayor (2020–26): Klaus Thurnhuber (FW)

Area
  - Total: 51.26 km^{2} (19.79 sq mi)
- Elevation: 744 m (2,441 ft)

Population (2025-12-31)
  - Total: 4,095
  - Density: 79.89/km^{2} (206.9/sq mi)
- Time zone: UTC+01:00 (CET)
  - Summer (DST): UTC+02:00 (CEST)
- Postal codes: 83627
- Dialling codes: 08021
- Vehicle registration: MB
- Website: www.warngau.de

Warngau (German pronunciation: [ˈvaʁnɡaʊ]) is a municipality in the Miesbach District of Bavaria, Germany. It is located at 47°50′N 11°44′E and has a population of 3,489.

Warngau has a railway station on the line from Munich to Lenggries with services operated by Bayerische Oberlandbahn (BOB). The railway near Warngau was the scene of a serious accident in 1975.
