= Valley, Bavaria =

Valley
- Municipality
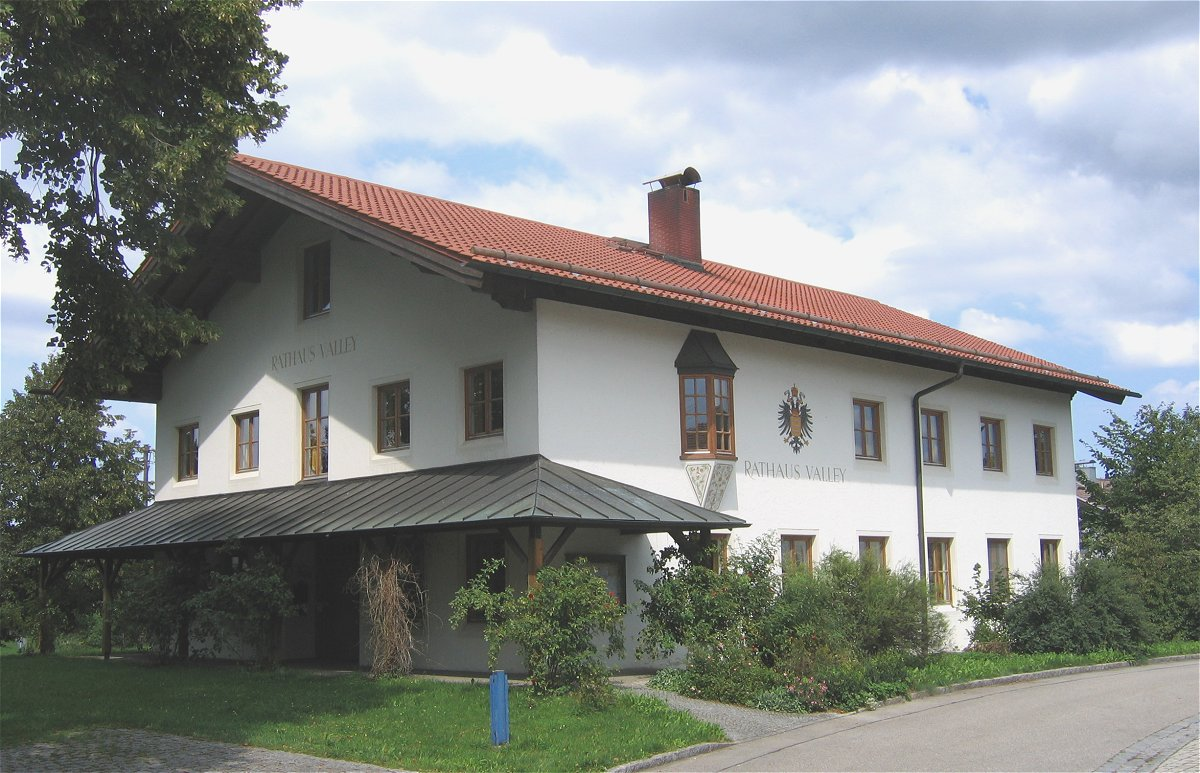
- Town hall

- Coat of arms

- Location of Valley within Miesbach district
- Interactive map of Valley
- Location within Germany Location within Bavaria
- Coordinates: 47°54′N 11°47′E
- Country: Germany
- State: Bavaria
- Admin. region: Oberbayern
- District: Miesbach
- Subdivisions: 19 Ortsteile

Government
  - Mayor (2020–26): Bernhard Schäfer (FW)

Area
  - Total: 42.18 km^{2} (16.29 sq mi)
- Elevation: 650 m (2,130 ft)

Population (2025-12-31)
  - Total: 3,380
  - Density: 80.1/km^{2} (208/sq mi)
- Time zone: UTC+01:00 (CET)
  - Summer (DST): UTC+02:00 (CEST)
- Postal codes: 83626
- Dialling codes: 08024
- Vehicle registration: MB
- Website: www.gemeinde-valley.de

Valley (German pronunciation: [faˈlaɪ]) is a municipality in the district of Miesbach in Bavaria in Germany. The municipality of Valley holds, as of 2006, 2949 inhabitants.

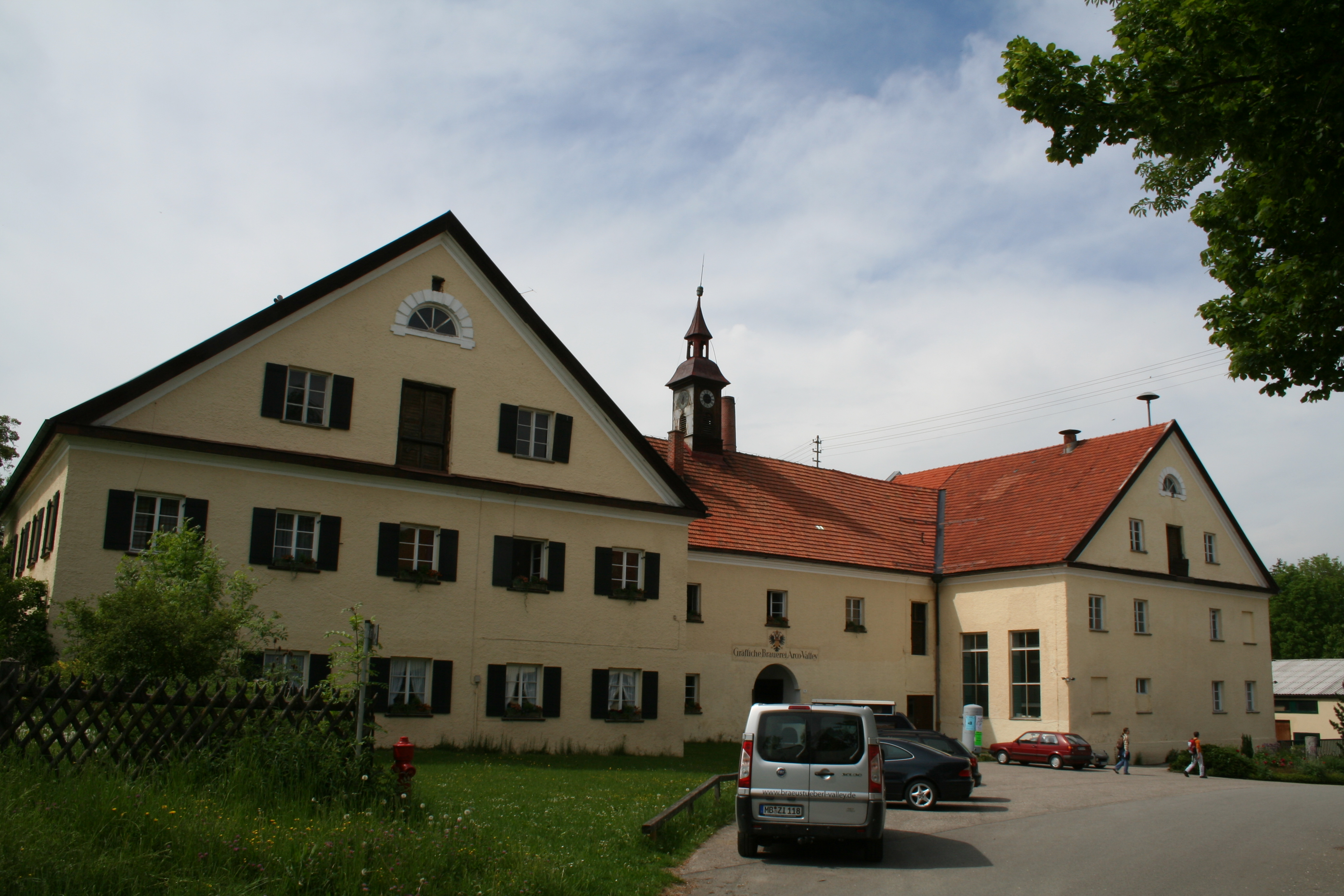
Castle brewery in Valley

Valley is also the name of a village of this municipality. In the village of Valley is located the castle Schloss Valley, property of the Counts of Arco, which holds a Museum of Culture and Organs. Valley is also locally renowned for the brewery Gräfliche Brauerei Arco-Valley, which brews the Graf Arco beer. In 2002, the village played host to the 1st Extreme Ironing World Championships.

Valley is located on the river Mangfall.

Traces can be found that track the history of the village back as far as to the Celts.
