= Extreme ironing =

Ironing in unconventional locations

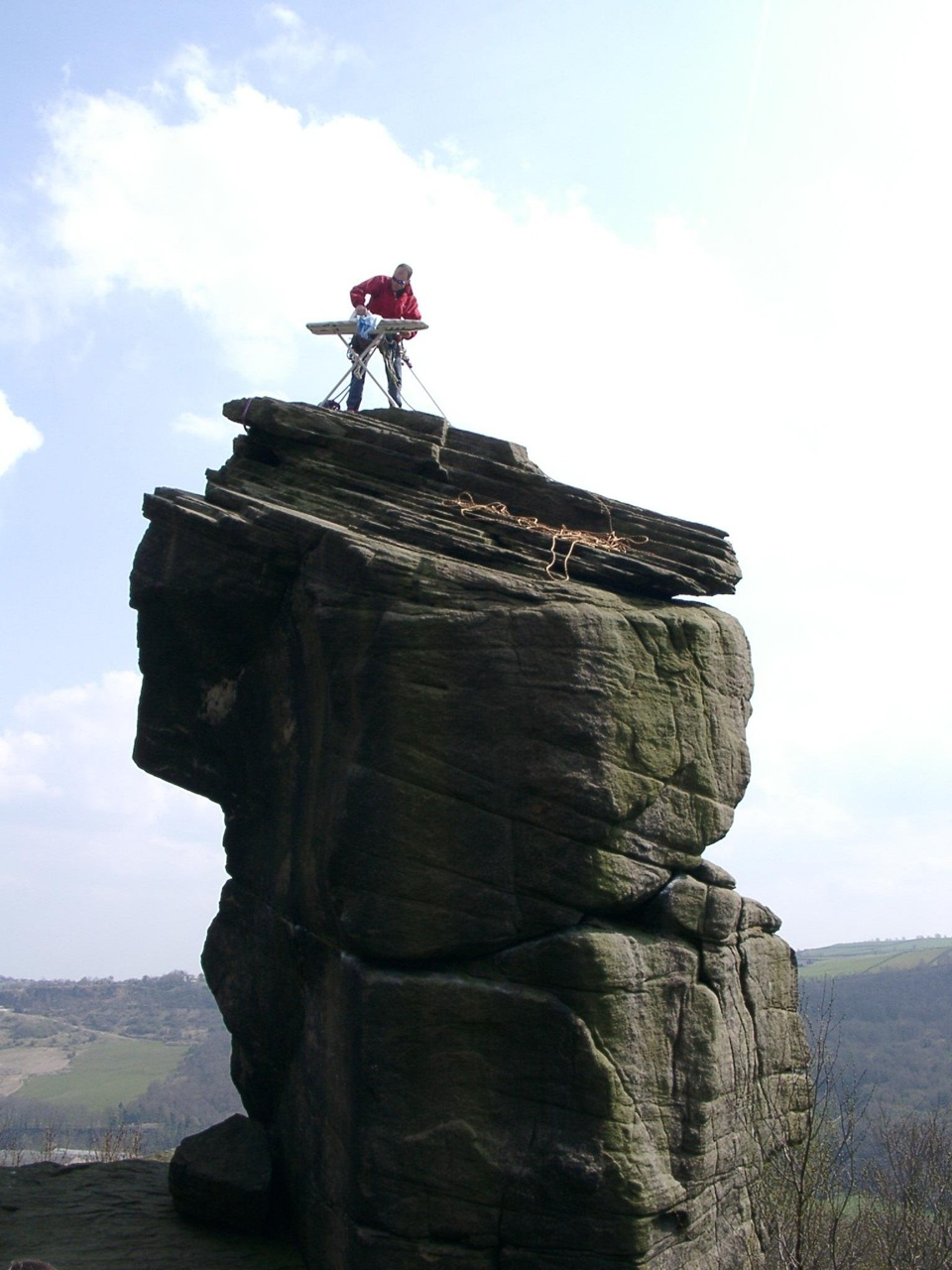
Extreme Ironing on Rivelin Needle. Rivelin Rocks, United Kingdom

Extreme Ironing (also called EI) is an extreme sport in which people take ironing boards to remote locations and iron items of clothing. According to the Extreme Ironing Bureau, extreme ironing is "the latest dangerous sport that combines the thrills of an extreme outdoor activity with the satisfaction of a well-pressed shirt."

Part of the attraction and interest the media has shown towards extreme ironing seems to center on the issue of whether it is really a sport or not. It is widely considered to be tongue-in-cheek.

Some locations where such performances have taken place include a mountainside of a difficult climb; a forest; in a canoe; while skiing or snowboarding; on top of large bronze statues; in the middle of a street; underwater; in the middle of the M1 motorway; in a keirin cycle race; while parachuting; and under the ice sheet of a frozen lake. The performances have been conducted solo or by groups.

== History ==
Extreme ironing was invented in 1997 in Leicester, England, by resident Phil Shaw in his back garden. Shaw came home from what he recalls as a hard day in a Leicester knitwear factory. Shaw had a number of chores to do, including ironing. Preferring the idea of an evening out rock climbing, he decided to combine the two activities into a new extreme sport. In June 1999, Shaw, who uses the nickname "Steam", embarked on an international tour to promote the activity. The stops included the United States, Fiji, New Zealand, Australia and South Africa. An encounter with German tourists in New Zealand led to the formation of a group called "Extreme Ironing International", and the German Extreme Ironing Section or GEIS. This has yet to popularize in North America.

A more extreme form of extreme ironing has been developed that includes bungee jumping.

The first competition for extreme ironing took place in Germany in 2002. Eighty teams competed in an obstacle course in which the competitors had to iron different articles of clothing in different dangerous settings. These settings included hanging from a tree, scaling a wall, and climbing under the hood of a car. A common misconception would be that competitors are scored only on how dangerous the location of their ironing is. But, the most significant part of scoring is actually how many wrinkles are left on the clothing and how the competitor chooses to iron the clothes. Competitors are scored for the quality of the pressing, style, and speed. Quality of the pressing counts for half of the points scored.

The sport gained international attention in 2003 after a documentary entitled Extreme Ironing: Pressing for Victory, was produced for Britain's Channel 4 by Wag TV. The program followed the British team's efforts and eventual Bronze and Gold placings in the 1st Extreme Ironing World Championships in Germany. A side-story looked at the rivalry between the EIB (Extreme Ironing Bureau) and a breakaway group called Urban Housework who were trying to establish their own extreme sport based around vacuum-cleaning. The film later aired on the National Geographic Channel.

In 2003, John Roberts and Ben Gibbons from Cheltenham, Gloucestershire and Christopher Allan Jowsey (boots) from Newcastle, Whitley Bay, ironed a Union Jack just above Everest Base Camp. This is believed to be the world altitude record for the sport. The reported height was 5,440 metres (17,850 ft) above sea level.

In 2003, the Rowenta Trophy was won by a group from South Africa by ironing across a gorge at the Wolfberg Cracks.

In 2004, the EIB traveled to the US on the Rowenta Tour to recruit additional ironists and ironed at Mount Rushmore, New York City, Boston and Devils Tower.

On 18 April 2011, tenor Jason Blair was filmed ironing on the M1 motorway in London, UK, a section of which had been closed following a fire.

In 2012, Extreme Ironing pioneer Steam came out of retirement to take on a new challenge and run the Hastings Half Marathon in March wearing an ironing board, pressing garments on the way.

=== Underwater ===
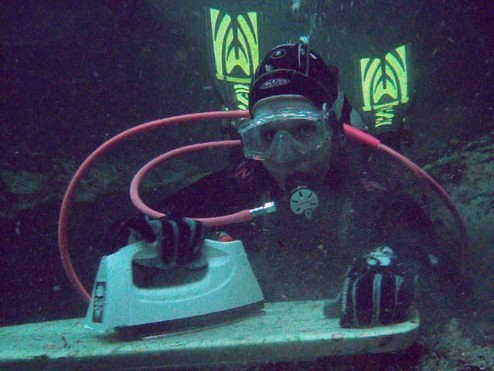
Underwater extreme ironing in Florida

In March 2008, a team of 72 divers simultaneously ironing underwater set a new world's record for number of people ironing underwater at once.

On 10 January 2009, 128 divers including six freedivers, attempted to break the previous world record, managing to confirm 86 divers ironing within a 10-minute period. The event took place at the National Diving and Activity Centre (NDAC) near Chepstow, Monmouthshire, and was organised by members of the Yorkshire Divers internet forum. In addition to breaking the world record, the event raised over £15000 for the Royal National Lifeboat Institution.

On 1 May 2010, a group of Dive Centers in Key Largo, Florida, attempted to claim the record. The event was part of the Conch Republic Days in the Florida Keys and was attempted by Keys Diver, Silent World Dive Center, and Captain Slates Atlantis Dive Center. The attempt took place at the historic site of the Christ of the Abyss at Key Largo Dry Rocks.

On 28 March 2011, Dutch diving club De Waterman from Oss, Netherlands, set the new (official) world record extreme underwater ironing. A group of 173 divers set the new world record in an indoor swimming pool in Oss. De Waterman organized this event to mark their 40-year anniversary.

On 16 June 2018, a freediver, Roland Piccoli, ironed a T-shirt at a depth of 42 m (138 ft) in the world's deepest pool (Y-40) in Montegrotto Terme Italy.

=== Related activities ===
Extreme Ironing has inspired other forms of unusual extreme activity, such as Extreme Cello Playing.

== In popular culture ==
The activity rose high enough in the zeitgeist to land an appearance on the long-running soap opera EastEnders. The 2 August 2004 episode featured a reference to the then-current altitude record holders the Hot Plate Brothers. As the party-loving Kat and Zoe Slater are preparing to go out, they are invited to the launch party at Angie's Den where celebrities—including the brothers—are supposed to appear.

It is also mentioned in Netflix's show Dino Girl Gauko Season 1, Episode 6.

== See also ==
- 1st Extreme Ironing World Championships
- Underwater basket weaving
- Wok racing
