= Alan Wood (engineer) =

Alan John Wood, CBE, FREng (born March 20, 1947), was brought up in Sheffield, where he was educated at King Edward VII School.

In 1965 he won an open scholarship to Manchester University and graduated in 1968 with a first class honours degree in mechanical engineering.

He began his career as an engineering management trainee with Unilever on Merseyside. During his five years with this company, he spent periods in the soap & detergents and chemical businesses, but his major experience was with Van den Bergh & Jurgens, where he held project management and plant management positions before returning to university to take a second degree. He studied in the United States at Harvard University, where he was awarded a master's degree in business administration in 1975.

Following his return to the UK, he took over responsibility for the manufacturing operations of Crittall Construction, a supplier of bespoke curtain wall projects for prestige office developments, and then became managing director of Small Electric Motors, a specialist manufacturer of servomotors and tachogenerators, before joining Siemens in 1981. Initially he worked for Siemens in Germany. He then headed up Siemens Measurements in Oldham before taking over responsibility for the Siemens' Electronic Components, Telecommunications & Office Automation Divisions based in Sunbury on Thames.

Wood then became group managing director in Manchester with responsibility for four of the UK divisions of the company. In April 1998 he took over as chief executive of Siemens plc. In 2005 he was elected as a Fellow to the Royal Academy of Engineering.

Wood is president of EEF, the manufacturers' organisation.

Business positions
Preceded by Jürgen Gehrels	Chief Executive of Siemens UK; April 1998 – September 2007	Succeeded by Tom White
