= Franz Gehrels =

German-American economist

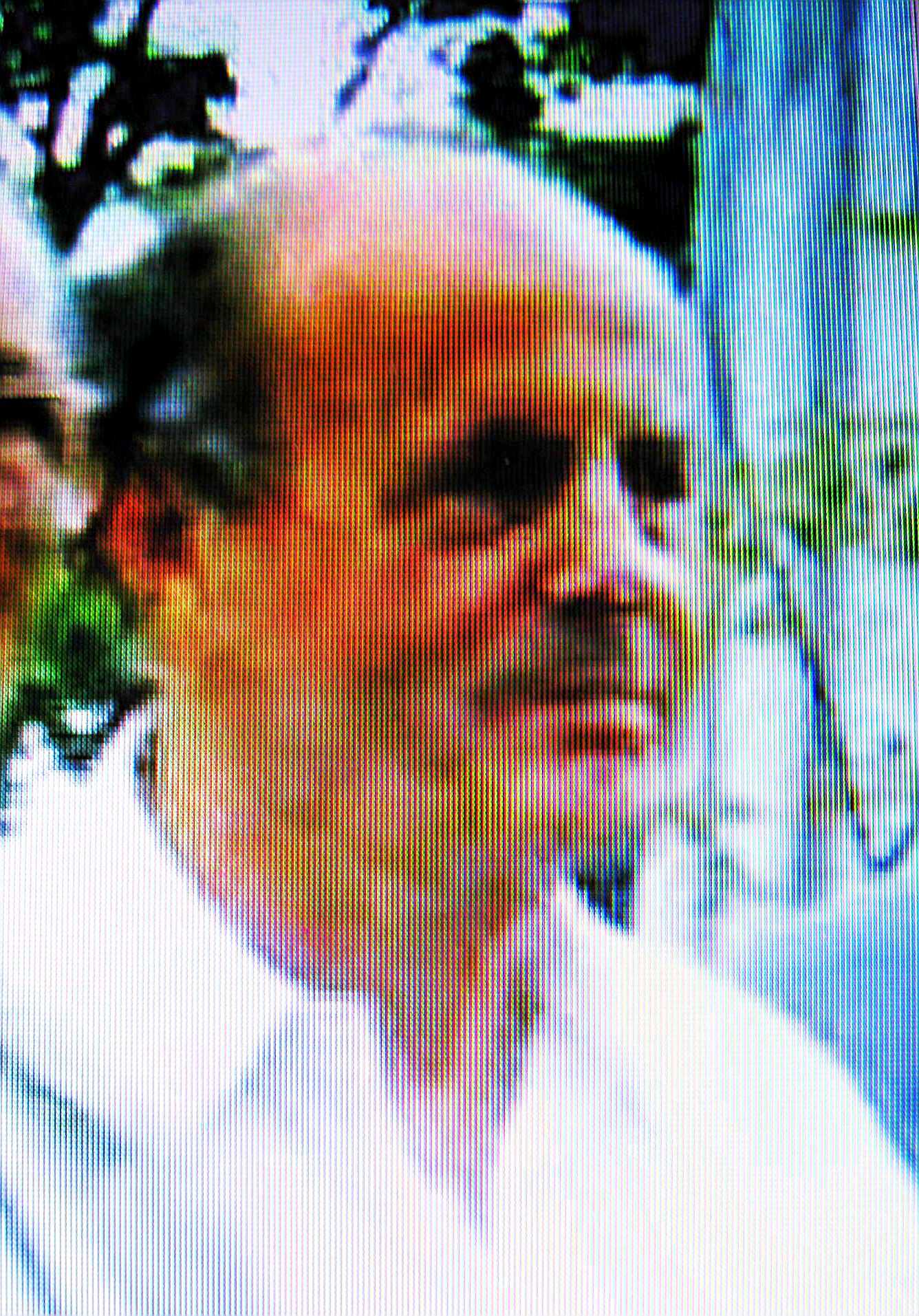
- Born: 2 March 1922; Eckernförde, Germany
- Died: 6 November 2018 (aged 96); Irschenberg, Germany

Academic background
- Education: Indiana University; University of Minnesota
- Influences: Hans-Werner Sinn

Academic work
- Discipline: economic growth macroeconomics
- Institutions: Ludwig-Maximilians-Universität München
- Awards: Fulbright Program

Franz Gehrels (22 March 1922, in Eckernförde – 6 November 2018, in Irschenberg) was a German-American economist and university teacher. In his scientific work he devoted himself in particular to the further development of the theory of international trade relations. In the 1970s he became an internationally recognized pioneer of advanced theory of international trade, among others by providing cutting-edge research on the optimal structure of trade and capital taxes.

== Life ==
Franz Gehrels, the son of the physician Frank Gehrels (1885–1974) and his wife Marie, b. Barsoe (1901–1974) was born in 1922 in Eckernförde, Northern Germany. His parents emigrated with their two-and-a-half-year-old son to the US in March 1924 via Bremerhaven and Ellis Island, New York City, to San Mateo, California. Franz Gehrels was married to Katharine (Kathy) Gehrels, b. Fechner (1914–2007). The couple has two daughters. After his studies and doctorate at Stanford University, Gehrels taught 22 years economics with a focus on international trade relations at Indiana University (1955–77), a year before at University of Minnesota, and another year at Johns Hopkins University.

Shortly after the end of World War II, Gehrels, being a professor of the Fulbright program in Mainz and Frankfurt, traveled to Germany on behalf of the US military administration (Office of Military Government, United States) (OMGUS). His task was to take stock of the available and unburdened German economists, at a time when many scientists occupied the reorganized chairs solely on the basis of their pro-French or anti-Nazi stance instead of their scientific qualifications.

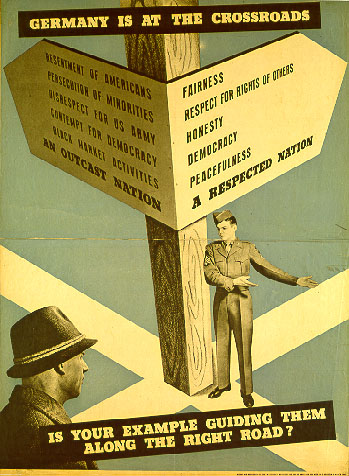
American re-education poster. OMGUS, US-Army, about 1947

Under the influence of his wife, also born in Germany, he moved back to Germany at the age of 55. From 1977 to 1990 Gehrels was full professor of economics, with particular emphasis on international trade relations at the Faculty of Economics of the Ludwig-Maximilians-Universität München (LMU). His research interests were in the areas of foreign trade and macroeconomics and economic growth. Thereafter, he was an emeritus at the Seminar for International Business Relations of the LMU.cs.

== Publications (selection) ==
Books

- Franz Gehrels: Außenwirtschaftstheorie. Oldenbourgs Lehr- und Handbücher der Wirtschafts- u. Sozialwissenschaften. De Gruyter Oldenbourg, Reprint 2017 (24. Oktober 1991), ISBN 3-486-22097-7
- Franz Gehrels: Essays in Macroeconomics of an Open Economy (Lecture Notes in Economics and Mathematical Systems). Springer, London, 1991, ISBN 3-540-54074-1
- Franz Gehrels: Optimal Growth with Many Sectors. Peter Lang GmbH, Internationaler Verlag der Wissenschaften, Berlin, 2002 ISBN 978-3-631-39174-7

Journal articles and book chapters

- Franz Gehrels: "Inflationary Effects of a Balanced Budget under Full Employment". The American Economic Review, Vol. 39, No. 6 (Dec. 1949), pp. 1276–1278
- Franz Gehrels: "Customs Union from a Single-Country Viewpoint". The Review of Economic Studies, Vol. 24, No. 1 (1956–1957), pp. 61–64
- Franz Gehrels: "Government Debt as a Generator of Economic Growth". The Review of Economics and Statistics, Vol. 39, No. 2 (1957), pp. 183–192
- Franz Gehrels: "Multipliers and Elasticities in Foreign-Trade Adjustments". Journal of Political Economy, Volume 65, Number 1 (1957), pp. 76
- Franz Gehrels: "Wachstum durch Investition in Wissenschaft und Bildung". Weltwirtschaftliches Archiv, Bd. 94 (1965), pp. 215–233
- Franz Gehrels: "Optimal Restrictions on Foreign Trade and Investment". The American Economic Review, Vol. 61, No. 1 (1971), pp. 147–159,
- Franz Gehrels: "Trade impediments, domestic goods, and the transfer problem". Review of World Economics, September 1978, Volume 114, Issue 3, pp. 481–498
- Franz Gehrels: "Foreign investment and technology transfer: Optimal policies". Review of World Economics, December 1983, Volume 119, Issue 4, pp. 663–685
- Franz Gehrels: "Risk Averse, Time Optimizing Behavior Of Households: Comparison With German Microcensus Data". In: Essays in Macroeconomics of an Open Economy, 1991, pp. 72–96
- Franz Gehrels: "Random Economic Disturbances and Lagged Countermeasures". Atlantic Economic Journal (AEJ), June 2005, Volume 33, Issue 2, pp. 151–157
- Franz Gehrels: "On Optimal Social Investment in the Sciences and Humanities". Atlantic Economic Journal, Volume 38, Issue 3 (2010), pp. 325–330
- Franz Gehrels: "United States and German Real Capital Formation and Social Investment in the Sciences and Humanities". Atlantic Economic Journal, Volume 41, Issue 3 (2013), pp. 225–229

== Awards ==
President of the International Atlantic Economic Society (IAES), Atlanta; 1996–1997

- Professor of the Fulbright Program in Mainz and Frankfurt;
- Best Article 2005 Award of the Atlantic Economic Journal (AEJ), Vol. 4, December 2006, for his article Franz Gehrels: "Random Economic Disturbances and Lagged Countermeasures". Atlantic Economic Journal (AEJ), which appeared in the June 2005 issue of the AEJ.
- Founding member (1991) and honorary member (1993) of the Center for Economic Studies (CES), ifo Institute for Economic Research, Munich
