= Michael Kießling =

German politician (born 1973)

Michael Kießling MdB
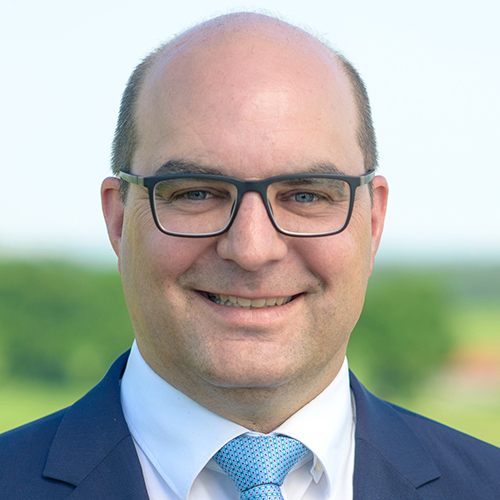
- Kießling in 2019

Member of the Bundestag; for Starnberg – Landsberg am Lech
- Incumbent
- Assumed office 24 October 2017
- Preceded by: Alexander Radwan

Personal details
- Born: 29 May 1973 (age 53) Rüti, Zürich, Switzerland
- Party: Christian Social Union
- Children: 2
- Education: Munich University of Applied Sciences

Michael Kießling (born 29 May 1973) is a German engineer and politician of the Christian Social Union (CSU) who has been serving as a member of the Bundestag from the state of Bavaria since 2017.

== Political career ==
Kießling became a member of the Bundestag in the 2017 German federal election, representing the Starnberg – Landsberg am Lech constituency.

In parliament, Kießling serves on the Committee on Construction, Housing, Urban Development and Communities and the Committee on the Environment, Nature Conservation and Nuclear Safety. In this capacity, he is his parliamentary group's rapporteur on the conversion of facilities no longer used by the Bundeswehr.

== Other activities ==
- Nuclear Waste Disposal Fund (KENFO), Alternate Member of the Board of Trustees (since 2022)
- Augsburg University of Applied Sciences, Member of the Board of Trustees
