= Extreme Cello =

Extreme sport and a performance art

Extreme Cellists

Extreme Cello is an extreme sport and a performance art in which people take a cello to an unusual, often outdoor, location and perform music. It is synonymous with the cello trio known as the Extreme Cellists, an amateur group inspired by the sport of Extreme Ironing. Their performances are generally given to raise money for various charities. Since 2006 the Extreme Cellists have had a particular association with the spinal injuries charity Aspire. According to their official website, Extreme Cello aims to "take musical performances to new heights, and depths, by giving performances in many extreme locations."

== History ==
The formation of the Extreme Cellists in 2003 to raise money for the music fund of Westways Primary School, Sheffield, is believed to have been the first organised Extreme Cello event. Before this, a number of individual cellists are known to have performed in unusual locations but did not use the phrase "Extreme Celling" to describe their activities.

Since then the Extreme Cellists have undertaken a range of challenges, most notably a tour of 42 English cathedral rooftops in 2006. In July 2008 they successfully completed the Four Peaks Challenge, playing at the summits of the tallest mountains in Scotland, England, Wales and Ireland. In 2010, they hiked Wainwright's famous Coast to Coast Walk across northern England, playing as they went. In April 2012, the three Extreme Cellists ran the London Marathon with cellos on their backs, playing occasionally along the way. In 2016 they performed on all 58 surviving seaside piers in Great Britain in just 14 days.

== Members ==
- Jeremy Dawson, lecturer
- Clare Wallace, teacher
- James Rees, teacher

== Musical style ==
The group's repertoire is varied. They perform arrangements of classical pieces such as Bach's Wachet Auf, Mozart's Eine Kleine Nachtmusik and the Adagio cantabile from Beethoven's trio for 3 cellos. They also perform more popular pieces such as "Up on the Roof", originally sung by The Drifters, "Climb Every Mountain" from The Sound of Music (Rodgers and Hammerstein), "Hi Ho Silver Lining", originally sung by Jeff Beck; "I'm Forever Blowing Bubbles"; and "Hey Jude" (Lennon & McCartney). Many of the pieces were arranged for cello trio performance by group member Jeremy Dawson.

== Performances ==
Date	Performance title	Performance locations
24 May 2003	The Original Extreme Cello Day	Mam Tor, Derbyshire; Blue John Cavern, Derbyshire; Sheffield University Arts Tower; Grindleford Station, Derbyshire; Padley Gorge, Derbyshire; Winter Garden, Sheffield
18 June 2005	The Extreme Cello Walk	Manchester Cathedral; Compstall, Cheshire; Hayfield, Derbyshire; Edale, Derbyshire; Bamford, Derbyshire; Sheffield Cathedral (NB some performances were vocal performances of Byrd's mass for Three Voices, for which the Extreme Cellists (also singers) were accompanied by Chris Tyler, Rachel Tyler and Laurie Cottam.
24 July-4 August 2006	The Extreme Cello Cathedral Roof Tour	Truro Cathedral; Exeter Cathedral; Wells Cathedral; Bristol Cathedral; Gloucester Cathedral; Hereford Cathedral; Worcester Cathedral; Christ Church, Oxford; Salisbury Cathedral; Winchester Cathedral; Portsmouth Cathedral; Guildford Cathedral; Chichester Cathedral; Canterbury Cathedral; Rochester Cathedral; Southwark Cathedral; St Paul's Cathedral; St Albans Cathedral; Chelmsford Cathedral; St Edmundsbury Cathedral; Norwich Cathedral; Ely Cathedral; Peterborough Cathedral; Leicester Cathedral; Coventry Cathedral; Birmingham Cathedral; Lichfield Cathedral; Derby Cathedral; Southwell Minster; Lincoln Cathedral; Sheffield Cathedral; Wakefield Cathedral; Manchester Cathedral; Chester Cathedral; Liverpool Cathedral; Blackburn Cathedral; Bradford Cathedral; York Minster; Ripon Cathedral; Durham Cathedral; Newcastle Cathedral; and Carlisle Cathedral
24 July 2007	The Extreme Cello Monopoly Board Challenge	London, specifically Old Kent Road; Whitechapel Road; The Angel, Islington; Euston Road; Pentonville Road; Pall Mall; Whitehall; Northumberland Avenue; Bow Street; Marlborough Street; Vine Street; The Strand; Fleet Street; Trafalgar Square; Leicester Square; Coventry Street; Piccadilly; Regent Street; Oxford Street; Bond Street; Park Lane; and Mayfair.
21–30 July 2008	The Extreme Cello Four Peaks Challenge	Ben Nevis (Scotland); Scafell Pike (England); Snowdon (Wales); Carrauntoohil (Ireland)
26 April 2009	Extreme Cello do the Sheffield Half-Marathon	Three locations en route
24 July-6 August 2010	The Extreme Cello Coast-to-Coast Challenge	38 locations between St Bees (Cumbria) and Robin Hood's Bay (North Yorkshire), whilst walking 193 miles
22 April 2012	Extreme Cello London Marathon	Greenwich Park to the Mall (26.2 miles running), performing at start and occasionally en route
15–20 August 2014	"Bordering on Madness"	Travelling the length of Hadrian's Wall, performing at a variety of locations along the way
20 July-4 August 2016	Extreme Cello's Pier Pressure	Performing on all 58 surviving seaside piers in Great Britain in the space of 14 days

== Discography ==
To date the Extreme Cellists have not released any recordings of their performances although some videos are available on various social media.
