= Die Scheinheiligen =

2001 film by Thomas Kronthaler

- Directed by: Thomas Kronthaler
- Written by: Thomas Kronthaler
- Produced by: Ismael Feichtl
- Starring: Maria Singer; Johannes Demmel; Michael Emina; Andreas Lechner; Werner Rom
- Cinematography: Micki Stoiber
- Edited by: Bernd Schlegel
- Music by: Martin Unterberger; Stefan Auer
- Release date: 11 November 2001
- Running time: 79 minutes
- Country: Germany
- Language: German

Die Scheinheiligen, or The Hypocrites, is a German low-budget comedy film, written and directed by Thomas Kronthaler and based on a true incident in his hometown of Irschenberg. It became popular particularly in Bavarian cinemas.

== Plot ==
The local government of Irschenberg are planning the construction of a motorway exit with a fast-food restaurant, for which they need the property of Magdalena Trenner, a rich old woman who is unpopular in the village until she takes in a traveling carpenter, Johannes, and later an asylum seeker named Theophile.

With their help she regains popularity among the villagers and thwarts the mayor's numerous plots to get his hands on her land. When she dies the mayor thinks he has won, but Johannes tricks them into believing she left a will leaving her entire property to the local scouts. After much wrangling, the mayor eventually has to abandon his plans.

== Cast ==
- Maria Singer as Magdalena Trenner
- Johannes Demmel as Johannes
- Michael Emina as Theophile
- Andreas Lechner as the priest
- Werner Rom as the mayor
- Wolfgang Fischer as policeman Bene
