= Otterfing =

- Municipality
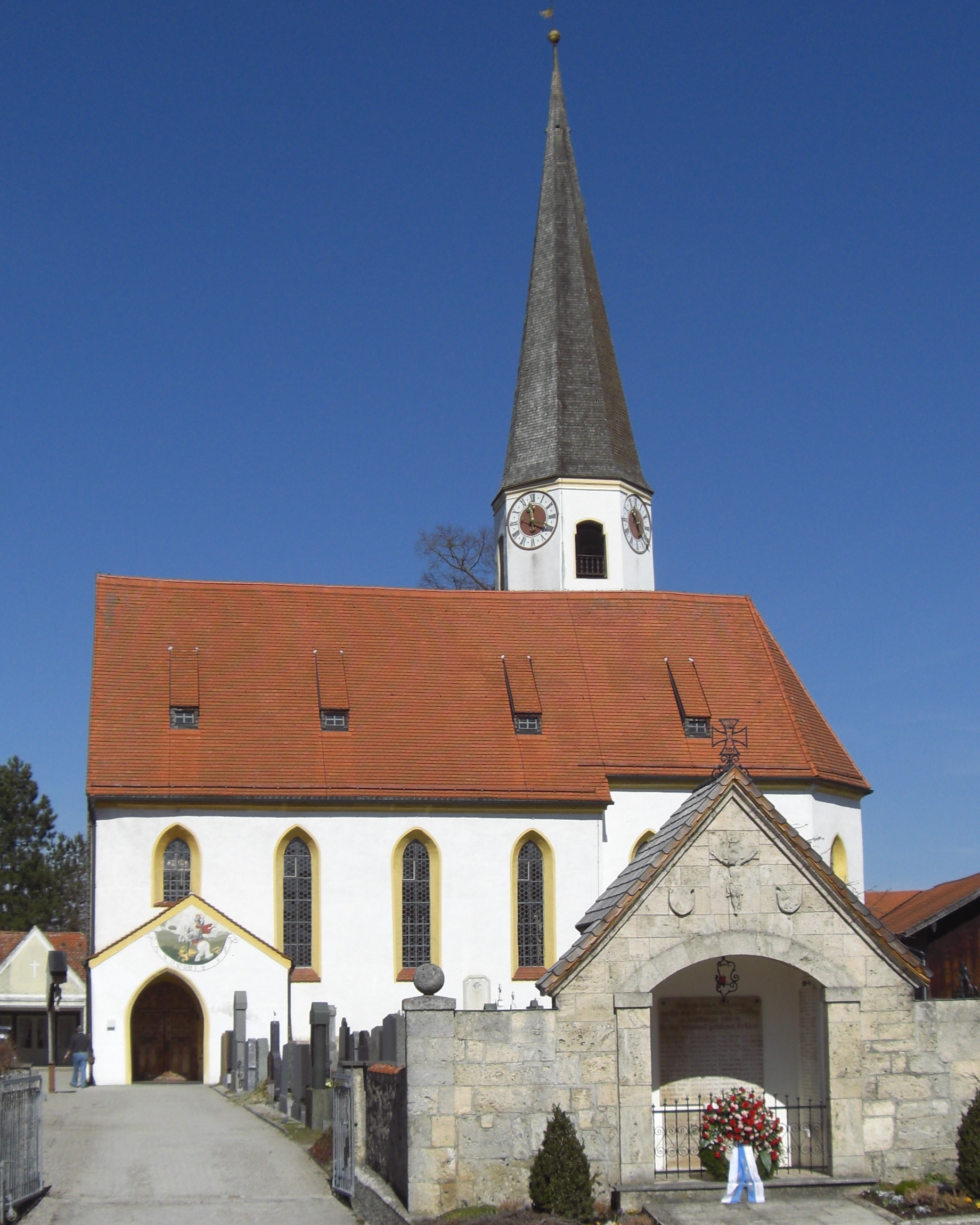
- Saint George Church

- Coat of arms

- Location of Otterfing within Miesbach district
- Interactive map of Otterfing
- Location within Germany Location within Bavaria
- Coordinates: 47°55′N 11°41′E
- Country: Germany
- State: Bavaria
- Admin. region: Upper Bavaria
- District: Miesbach

Government
  - Mayor (2020–26): Michael Falkenhahn (SPD)

Area
  - Total: 21.15 km^{2} (8.17 sq mi)
- Elevation: 675 m (2,215 ft)

Population (2025-12-31)
  - Total: 4,619
  - Density: 218.4/km^{2} (565.6/sq mi)
- Time zone: UTC+01:00 (CET)
  - Summer (DST): UTC+02:00 (CEST)
- Postal codes: 83624
- Dialling codes: 08024
- Vehicle registration: MB
- Website: www.otterfing.de

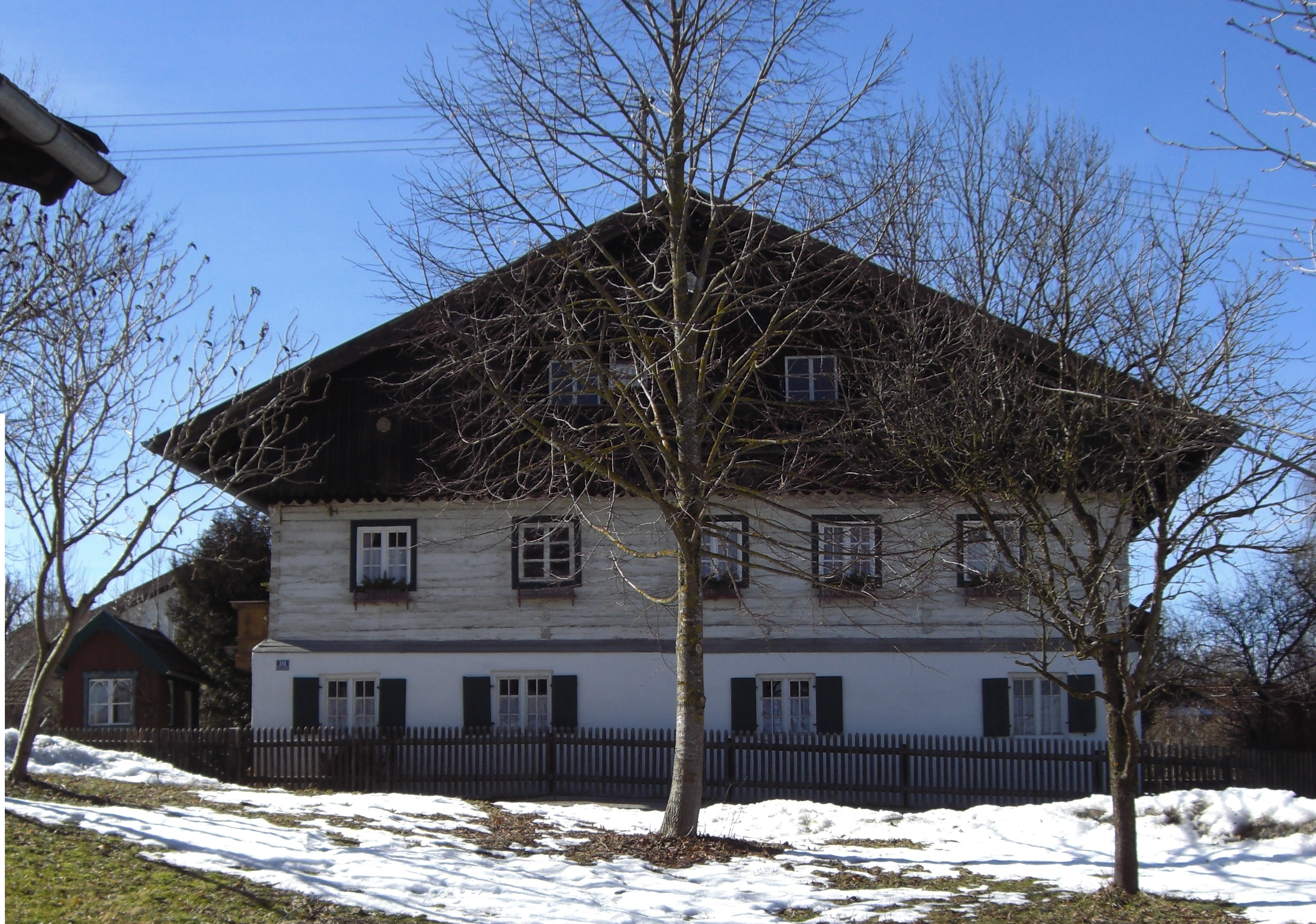
The old Matheishof

Otterfing (German pronunciation: [ˈɔtɐfɪŋ]) is a municipality in the district of Miesbach in Bavaria in Germany.

== Geography ==
=== Geographical Location and Municipal Area ===
Otterfing lies on end moraine hills of the last Ice Age in the foothills of the Alps overlooking the Mangfall Mountains. The village Otterfing is located in the middle of Upper Bavaria on the Bundesstraße 13 only 4 km north of Holzkirchen directly on the southern border of the administrative district Munich. In the north, the Hofoldinger Forest borders the municipal area. After the dissolution of this forest area as a community-free area, parts of it were added to Otterfing on 1 January 2011.

The state capital Munich is 30 km away, the district town Miesbach 23 km, Wolfratshausen 21 km, Bad Tölz 22 km and Rosenheim 37 km.

=== Parts of Otterfing ===
Besides Otterfing itself there are five districts:

- Bergham, approx. 0.5 km west of the town centre
- Heigenkam, approx. 2.4 km northwest
- Holzham, approx. 0.7 km southeast
- Palnkam, approx. 1.6 km southwest of the town centre and 1 km west of the main road Bundesstrasse 13
- Wettlkam, approx. 2.2 km northwest

=== Neighbouring Communities ===
Sauerlach, Aying (both districts Munich), Holzkirchen (district Miesbach) and Dietramszell (district Bad Tölz-Wolfratshausen).

== History ==
=== Until Foundation of Community ===
Archaeological finds prove the settlement already in the Celtic period. In 1942, during excavation work near the station, the grave of a woman from the late Roman period (ca. 350 to 355 AD) was discovered. Among other burial objects, a coin from the reign of Constantius II. was recovered from a depth of 1.30 metres.

Otterfing was first mentioned in a document in 1003 in a traditional book of the Tegernsee monastery as "Otolvinga". After many different spellings the place is already called Otterfing in 1568 in the Bavarian country tables of Philipp Apian.

Otterfing has been an independent political community since the administrative reforms in Bavaria in 1818.

=== District Membership ===
Until 1 July 1972 Otterfing belonged to the former Wolfratshausen district. When this was merged with the district of Bad Tölz, Otterfing joined the district of Miesbach.

=== Population Growth ===
- 1818: 435 inhabitants
- 1875: 629 inhabitants
- 1945: 768 inhabitants
- 1950: 1492 inhabitants
- 1961: 1542 inhabitants
- 1970: 1925 inhabitants
- 1975: 2489 inhabitants
- 1991: 3476 inhabitants
- 1995: 3719 inhabitants
- 2000: 4122 inhabitants
- 2005: 4337 inhabitants
- 2010: 4519 inhabitants
- 2015: 4699 inhabitants

== Politics ==
=== Local Council ===
After the last local elections on 16 March 2014, the municipal council has 16 members. Voter turnout was 65.3%. The election brought the following result:

| CSU | 6 seats | (36,6 %) |
| SPD | 4 seats | (23,5 %) |
| Freie Wählergemeinschaft | 3 seats | (22,5 %) |
| GRÜNE | 3 seats | (17,4 %) |

=== Emblem ===
Otterfing has only had its own municipal coat of arms since 1972.

It shows the three golden crowns of the Tegernsee monastery on a blue background above. In the middle are two silver ibexes from the coat of arms of those of Kurz von Senftenau, from whom the Count dynasty of Valley originates. Tegernsee and Valley were important landowners in the village until the community was formed in 1818.

The golden arch below symbolises the Teufelsgraben, a dry valley south of Otterfing, where the melting water of the Isar-Loisach glacier once flowed off.

== Transport ==
Otterfing is located on the Munich-Holzkirchen railway line and is directly connected to the Munich S-Bahn line S3, which runs every 20 or 40 minutes in the direction of Munich and Holzkirchen. The Bavarian Oberlandbahn serves Otterfing during rush hours.

The federal highway B8 is three kilometers east of the town center; the nearest Sauerlach junction in the north can be reached in ten kilometers and Holzkirchen in the south in eight kilometers.

== Religion ==
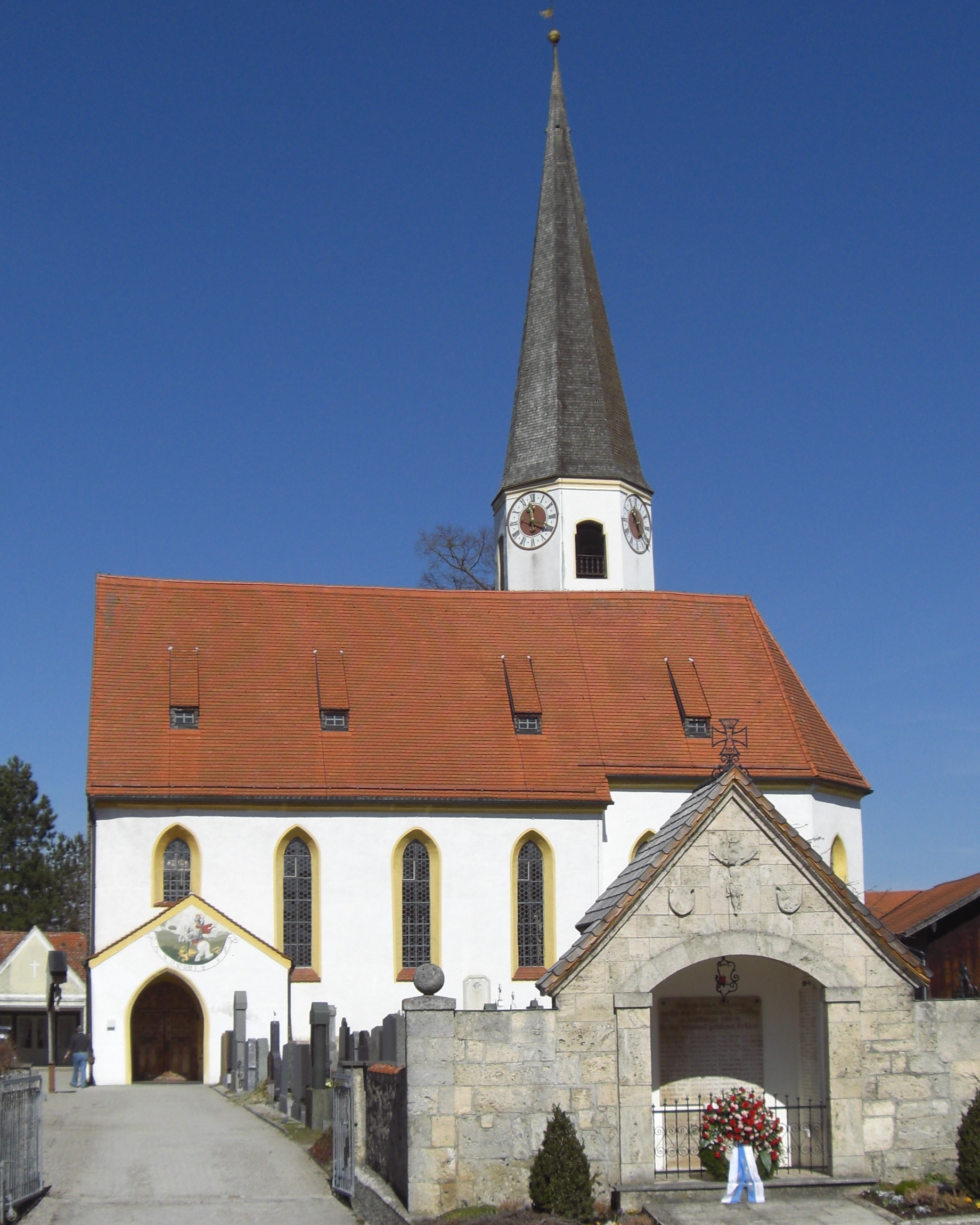
Parish church St. Georg

About 59% of the population are Roman-Catholic, 14% Protestant; about 27% do not belong to any other religious community.

The parish church and landmark of Otterfing is St. Georg. Branch churches are in the districts of Bergham (St. Valentin) and Wettlkam (Heilig Kreuz).

The Evangelical Methodist Church has a service centre in Otterfing.

Two congregations of Jehovah's Witnesses share the Kingdom Hall in Otterfing.

== Bibliography (German) ==
- Eduard Moser: Ein oberbayerisches Bauerndorf im Holzlande – Otterfing bei Holzkirchen (Oberbayern), Heimatbücherverlag Müller & Königer, München, 1925
- Gemeinde Otterfing (Herausgeberin): Otterfing – Heimatbuch, Band 1, 2005
