= Jürgen Gehrels =

German businessman

Jürgen Carlos Gehrels KBE FIET (born 24 July 1935) is a German businessman, and a former Chief Executive and Chairman of Siemens UK (Siemens Holdings plc).

== Early life ==
He was the son of Dr Hans Gehrels and Ursula da Rocha. He attended the Technical University of Munich and Technische Universität Berlin.

== Career ==
=== Siemens ===
From 1965 to 1979 he worked for Siemens AG in Germany.

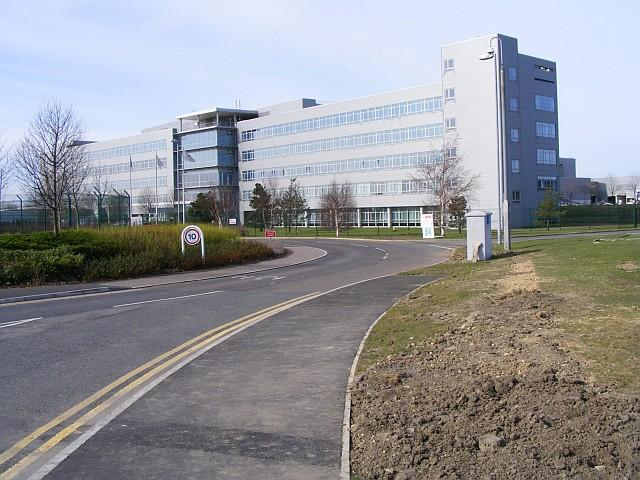
Former Siemens microprocessor factory in March 2009, now Cobalt Park

=== Siemens UK ===
He became Chief Executive of Siemens UK in 1986. In 1995 he was responsible for opening the Siemens Semiconductors plant on North Tyneside, a £1.1bn inward investment; the largest-ever inward investment in the UK. The plant was opened by the Queen in May 1997. The site is now the Cobalt Business Park, off the A19.

He left as Chairman of Siemens UK in September 2007. At the time, Siemens employed around 20,000 people in the UK, turning over around £3.5bn.

== Personal life ==
He lives at Porlezza in Italy. He married Sigrid Kausch in 1963, and they had a son and a daughter. He is an Anglophile.

Business positions
Preceded by	Chairman of Siemens UK; 1998 – September 2007	Succeeded by Alan Wood
Preceded by	Chief Executive of Siemens UK; 1986 – March 1998	Succeeded by Alan Wood
