= Miesbach =

- Town
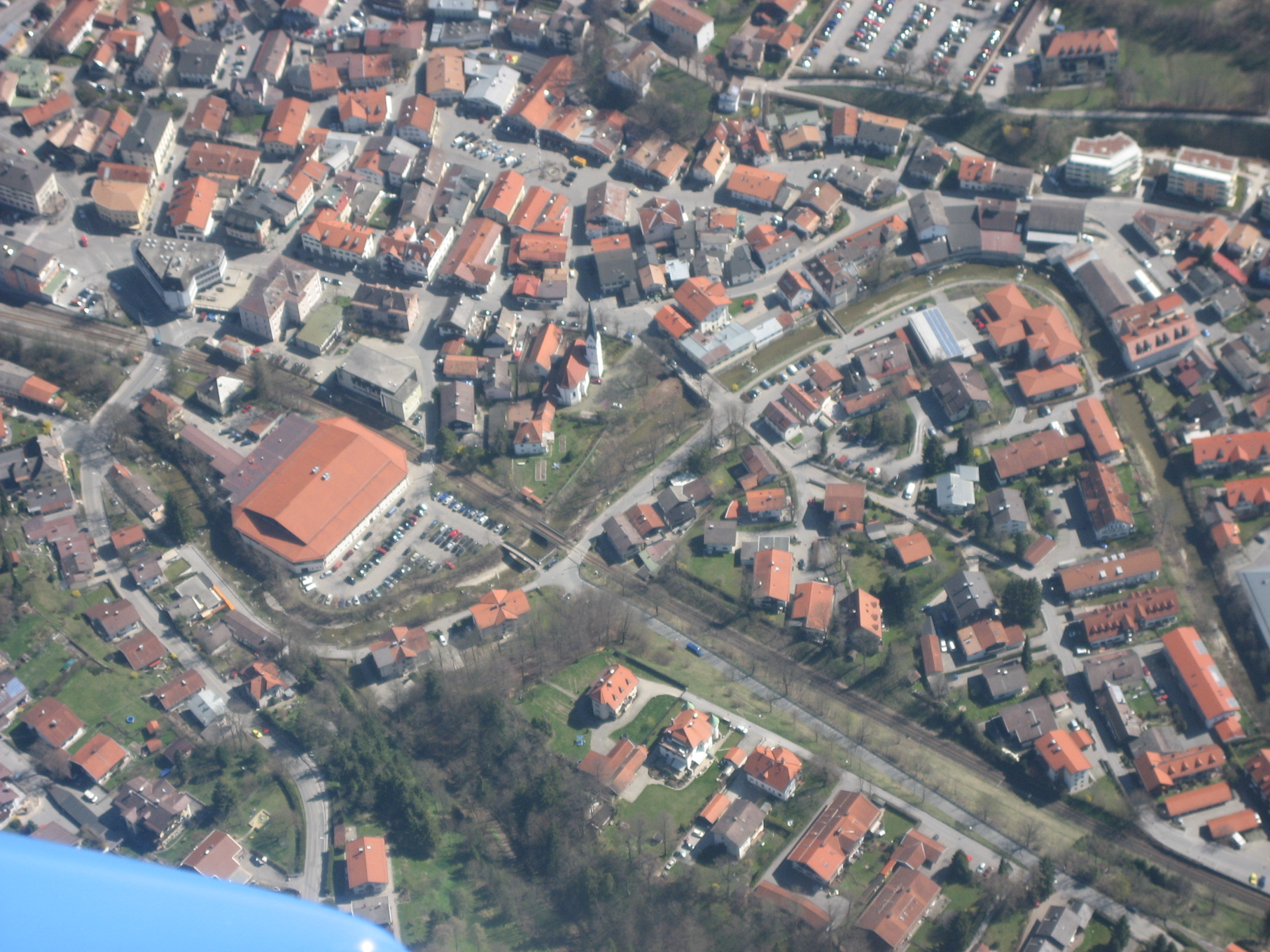
- Aerial view

- Coat of arms

- Location of Miesbach within Miesbach district
- Interactive map of Miesbach
- Location within Germany Location within Bavaria
- Coordinates: 47°47′N 11°50′E
- Country: Germany
- State: Bavaria
- Admin. region: Oberbayern
- District: Miesbach

Government
  - Mayor (2020–26): Gerhard Braunmiller (CSU)

Area
  - Total: 32.44 km^{2} (12.53 sq mi)
- Elevation: 697 m (2,287 ft)

Population (2025-12-31)
  - Total: 11,334
  - Density: 349.4/km^{2} (904.9/sq mi)
- Time zone: UTC+01:00 (CET)
  - Summer (DST): UTC+02:00 (CEST)
- Postal codes: 83714
- Dialling codes: 08025
- Vehicle registration: MB
- Website: www.miesbach.de

Miesbach (German: [ˈmiːsbax]) is a town in Bavaria, Germany, and is the capital of the Miesbach district. The district is at an altitude of 697 metres above sea level. It covers an area of approximately 863.50 km^{2} of alpine headlands and in 2017 had a population of 11,477. The town is located 48 km southeast of Munich. Lake Schliersee and Lake Tegernsee, around which are the internationally renowned spas, Bad Wiessee, Rottach-Egern and Tegernsee, are nearby. Miesbach was founded around the year 1000 and was for hundreds of years the seat of the County of Hohenwaldeck. In the 19th century, it became the centre of the conservation movement for the traditional costumes, the Tracht. Miesbach also has a rich history as a pilgrimage and a mining village, which can still be seen in the city landscape.

On September 16, 1882, Miesbach became the starting point for the first long-distance transmission of electric power in the world. A 1,343 voltage power transmission line transferred electricity from Miesbach over a distance of 35 miles (57 km) to Munich.

The starting point was the technologically advanced Miesbach mine, where electricity was generated using a steam engine. On the receiving end in the Munich Glass Palace, an electric pump powered an artificial waterfall. With this, Oskar von Miller and Marcel Deprez were able to show that electric power could indeed be transferred over long distances.

Miesbach is the birthplace of Verismo painter Christian Schad.

== Mayor ==
The mayor is Gerhard Braunmiller (CSU). He was elected in 2020.

== Twin town ==
- (United Kingdom) Tewkesbury, Gloucestershire, UK

== Literature ==
- Langheiter, Alexander: Miesbach. Ein Kulturführer. Miesbach: Maurusverlag, 2006.
