= Miesbach (district) =

Coordinates: 47°45′N 11°50′E

- District
- Flag Coat of arms
- Country: Germany
- State: Bavaria
- Adm. region: Upper Bavaria
- Capital: Miesbach

Government
  - District admin.: Olaf von Löwis of Menar (CSU)

Area
  - Total: 864 km^{2} (334 sq mi)

Population (31 December 2024)
  - Total: 97,152
  - Density: 112/km^{2} (291/sq mi)
- Time zone: UTC+01:00 (CET)
  - Summer (DST): UTC+02:00 (CEST)
- Vehicle registration: MB
- Website: landkreis-miesbach.de

Miesbach (German: [ˈmiːsˌbax]) is a Landkreis (district) in Bavaria, Germany. It is bounded by (from the west and clockwise) the districts of Bad Tölz-Wolfratshausen, Munich and Rosenheim, and by the Austrian state of Tyrol.

== History ==
In medieval times, most of the district was occupied by clerical states. The Miesbach district today is the union of the areas that were formerly occupied by the Hohenwaldeck county, the territories owned by the powerful Tegernsee Abbey, the territories owned by the Weyarn Abbey and Valley County. Hohenwaldeck was annexed by Bavaria in 1734, Valley in 1777. The clerical states were dissolved in 1803 and fell to Bavaria as well. Miesbach was established in 1803: the foundation ceremony took place in the court district of Hohenwaldeck. In 1818 Tegernsee was established. The same year the Aibling district was established too and Miesbach had to deliver 12 municipalities. In 1939 Tegernsee was merged into Miesbach. During the territorial reform in Bavaria in 1972 Otterfing was merged into Miesbach too and the district Wolfratshausen as well.

== Geography ==
The southern half of the district is located in the Bavarian Alps. This section of the Alps is called Mangfall Mountains (Mangfallgebirge) as the River Mangfall has its source here. The most important peaks are Rotwand ("Red Wall", 1,884 m), the highest mountain in the area, and Wendelstein (1,838 m).

The river Mangfall, a short but broad affluent of the river Inn, flows northward with the district's municipalities on either bank. In the initial part of its course it runs through Tegernsee Lake (9 km^{2}).

== Coat of arms ==
The coat of arms displays:

- a red eagle and two crossed staves, symbolising the county of Hohenwaldeck
- two water lily leaves above a wavy line, the ancient arms of the monastery of Tegernsee

== Government ==
Charge	Name	Years in office
District Minister	Franz Xaver Steyrer; Max Graf von Preysing; Joseph Wiesend; Wolfgang Knorr; Alois Schmid; Carl Bollweg	1803–1806; 1806–1813; 1813–1846; 1846–1848; 1848–1851; 1851–1862, 1874
Joint President	Carl Bollweg; Ludwig Mayr; Uhl; Carl Riezler; Bernhard de Rudder; Hermann Kopp	1851, 1862–1874; 1874–1888; 1888–1890; 1890–1911; 1911–1929; 1929–1938, 1943
District Administrator	Kemnitzer	1943–1944
District Administrator	Dr. Frick	1944–1945
District Administrator	Dr. von Wehner	May 10, 1945 – August 1, 1945
District Administrator	Schindler	August 1, 1945 – May 10, 1946
District Administrator	Friedrich Roith	May 11, 1946 – May 27, 1946
District Administrator	Freiherr von Schoen	May 28, 1946 – June 11, 1946
District Administrator	Friedrich Roith	June 11, 1946 – September 25, 1946
District Administrator	Dr. Süß	September 26, 1946 – May 31, 1948
District Administrator	Meissner	June 5, 1948 – December 14, 1948
District Administrator	Dr. Simon Beck	1949–1951
District Administrator	Anton Bauer	1952–1955
District Administrator	Dr. Walter Königsdorfer	1955–1972
District Administrator	Wolfgang Gröbl	1972–1987
District Administrator	Norbert Kerkel	1987–2008
District Administrator	Jakob Kreidl	2008–2014
District Administrator	Wolfgang Rzehak	2014–2020
District Administrator	Olaf von Löwis of Menar	since 2020

== Towns and municipalities ==
Clickable map of towns and municipalities in the district

Towns
1. Miesbach
2. Tegernsee
Municipalities
1. Bad Wiessee
2. Bayrischzell
3. Fischbachau
4. Gmund am Tegernsee
5. Hausham
6. Holzkirchen
7. Irschenberg

8. Kreuth
9. Otterfing
10. Rottach-Egern
11. Schliersee
12. Valley
13. Waakirchen
14. Warngau
15. Weyarn
