= Dürnbach =

Dürnbach may refer to:

- Dürnbach (Festenbach), a river of Bavaria, Germany, tributary of the Festenbach
- Suhi Potok, German: Dürnbach, settlement in southern Slovenia
- Dürnbach, a district of Gmund am Tegernsee, in Bavaria, Germany
- Dürnbach, a village of Waldegg, Wiener Neustadt-Land District, Austria
- Dürnbach, a village of Dunkelsteinerwald, Melk District in Lower Austria, Austria
