= Braunau (river) =

River in Germany

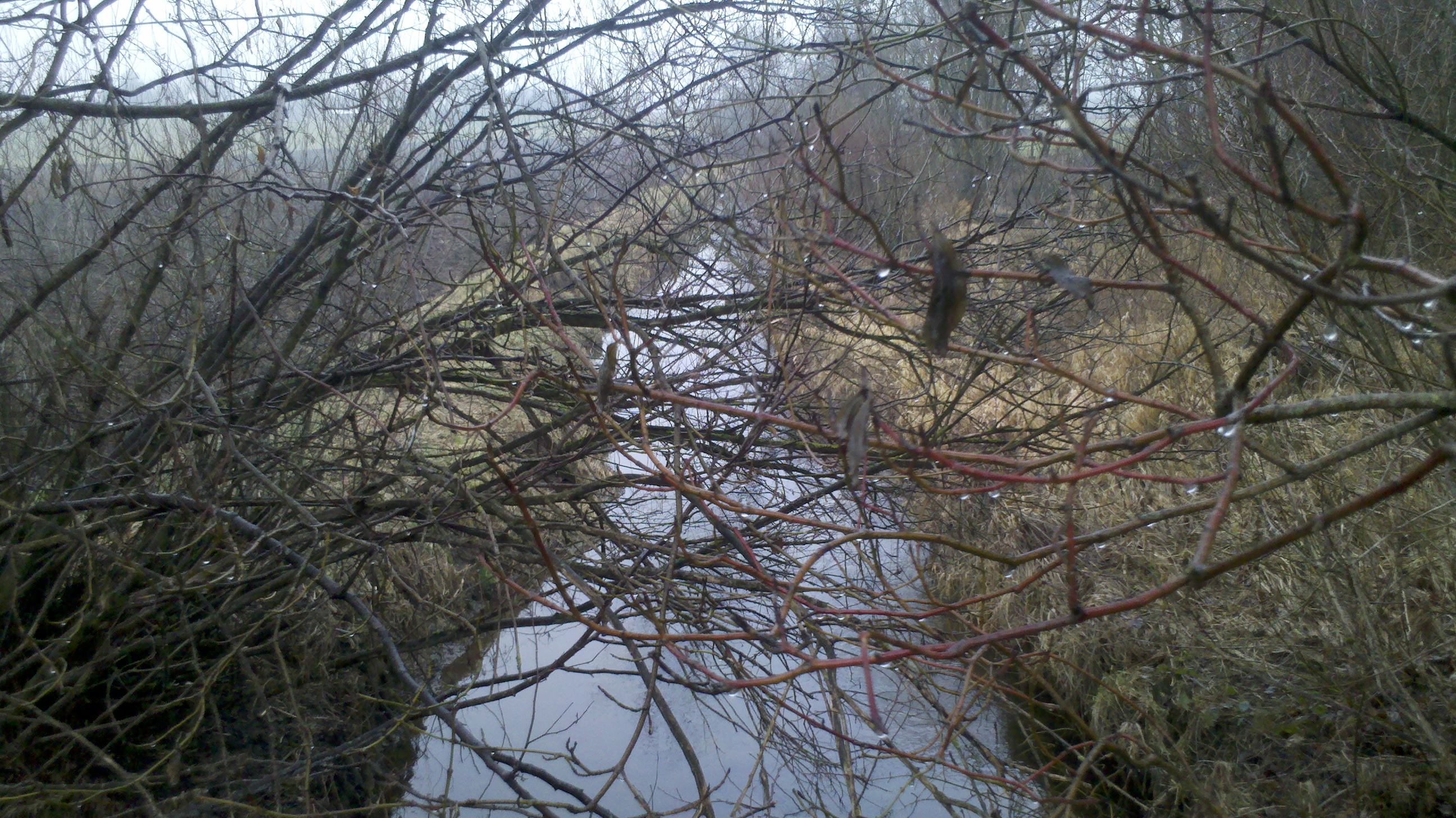
- The Braunau near Beyharting (a parish of Tuntenhausen)

Location
- Country: Germany
- State: Bavaria

Physical characteristics
- Source
  - location: 47°59′06″N 11°55′21″E
  - elevation: 510 m
- Mouth
  - location: Glonn
  - coordinates: 47°55′12.8″N 12°00′9.5″E
  - elevation: 480 m
- Length: 10.5 km (6.5 mi)

Basin features
- Progression: Glonn→ Mangfall→ Inn→ Danube→ Black Sea

Braunau (German pronunciation: [ˈbʁaʊnaʊ]) is a river of Bavaria, Germany. It flows into the Glonn near Tuntenhausen.

== See also ==
- List of rivers of Bavaria
