= Söllbach =

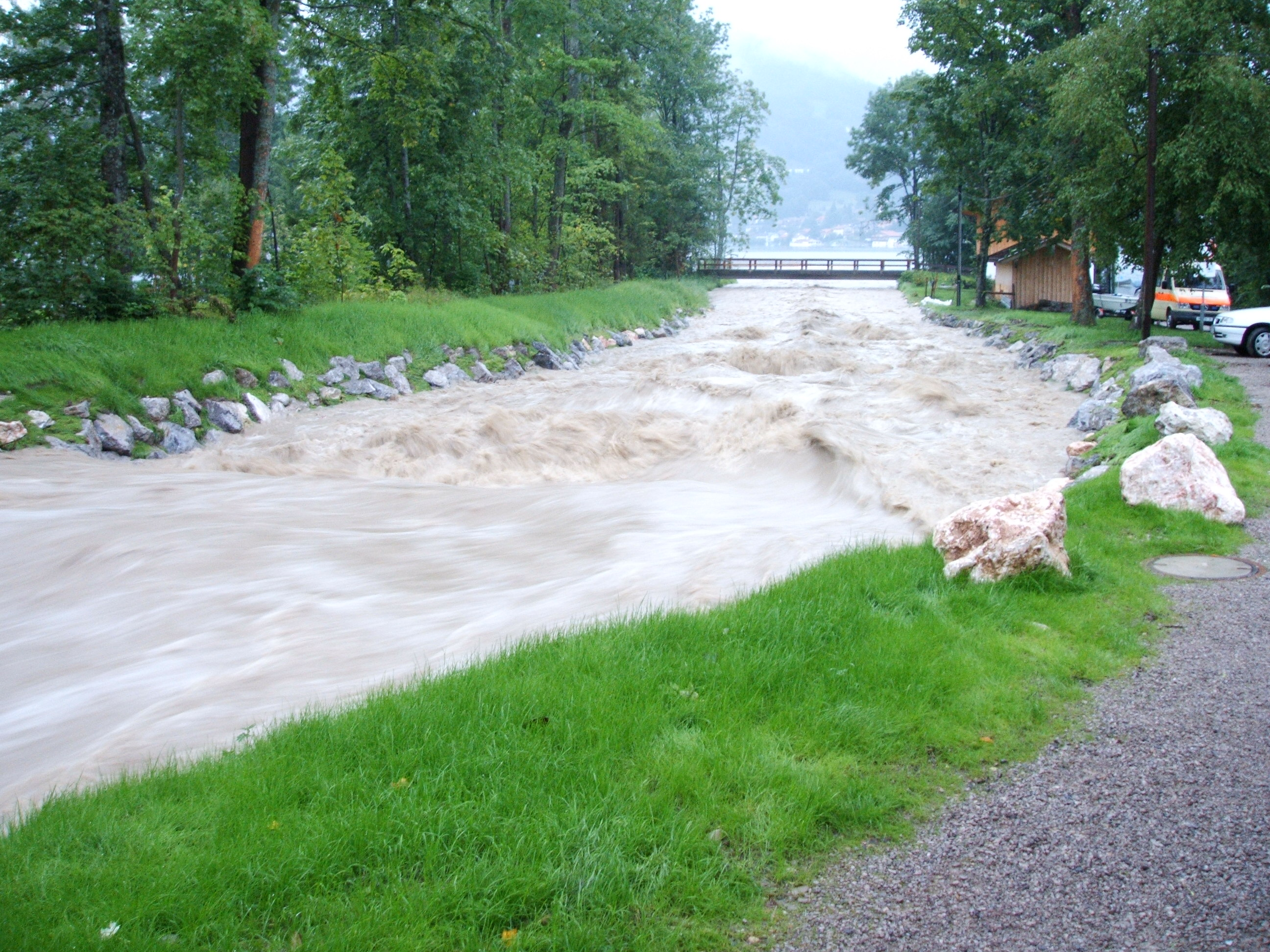
- The Söllbach in Bad Wiessee during the 2005 floods, in the background the Tegernsee

Location
- Country: Germany
- State: Bavaria

Physical characteristics
- Mouth
  - location: Tegernsee
  - coordinates: 47°42′21″N 11°44′25″E
- Length: 13.0 km (8.1 mi)

Basin features
- Progression: Mangfall→ Inn→ Danube→ Black Sea

Söllbach is a river of Bavaria, Germany. It flows into the lake Tegernsee, which is drained by the Mangfall, near Bad Wiessee.

== See also ==
- List of rivers of Bavaria
