= Quirinbach =

River in Germany

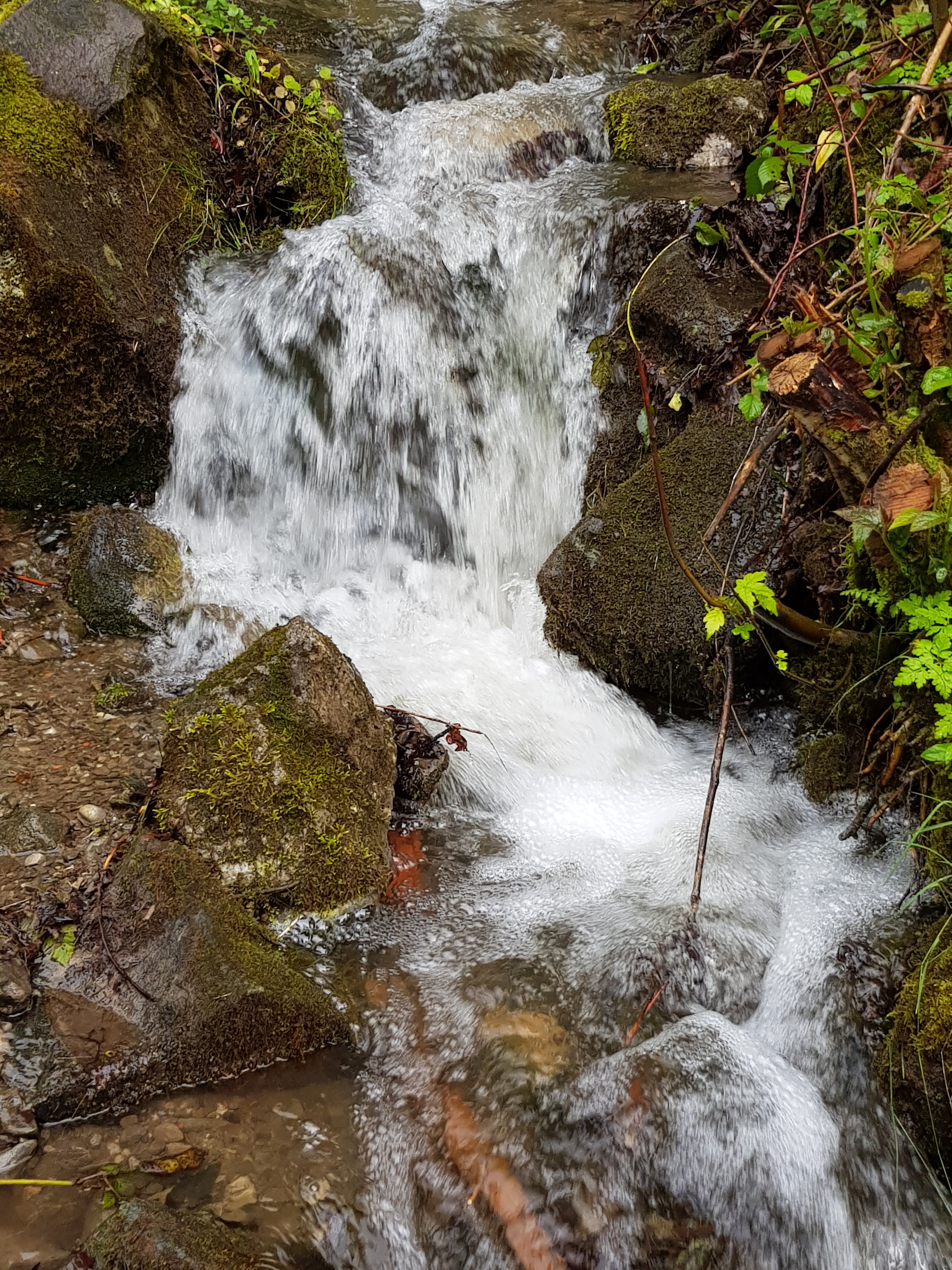

- Location of mouth in Bavaria

Location
- Country: Germany
- States: Bavaria

Physical characteristics
- Mouth
  - location: Tegernsee
  - coordinates: 47.7248°N 11.7451°E

Basin features
- Progression: Mangfall→ Inn→ Danube→ Black Sea

The Quirinbach is a small river in Bavaria, Germany. It flows into the Tegernsee, which is drained by the Mangfall, in Sankt Quirin.

== See also ==
- List of rivers of Bavaria
