= Hainerbach =

River in Germany

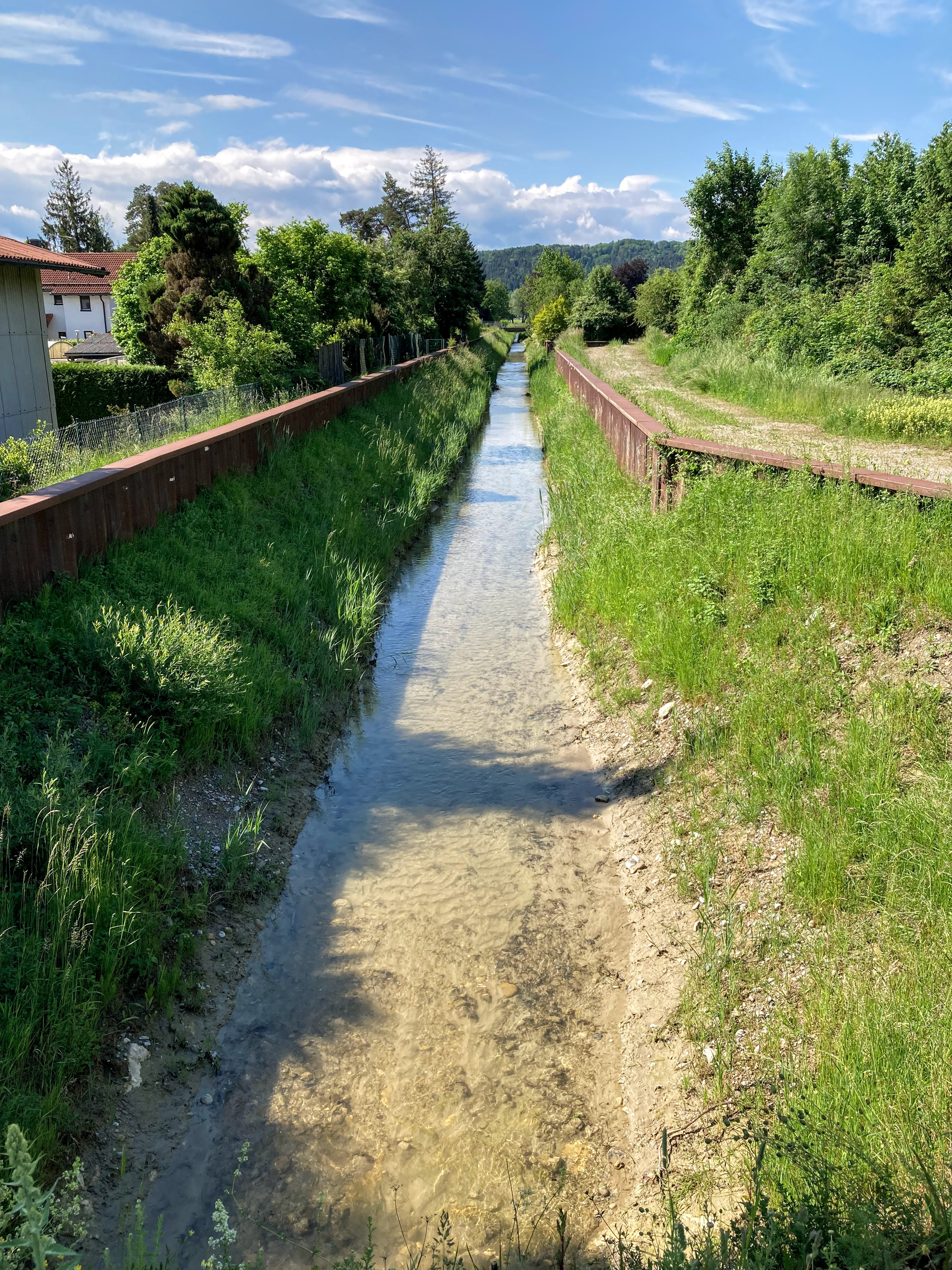
- The Hainerbach near its mouth

Location
- Country: Germany
- State: Bavaria

Physical characteristics
- Mouth
  - location: Mangfall
  - coordinates: 47°52′42″N 11°54′05″E
- Length: 3.8 km (2.4 mi)

Basin features
- Progression: Mangfall→ Inn→ Danube→ Black Sea

Hainerbach is a small river of Bavaria, Germany. It is a right tributary of the Mangfall in Bruckmühl.

== See also ==
- List of rivers of Bavaria
