= Counts of Falkenstein =

Counts of Falkenstein may refer to:

- Counts of Falkenstein (Bavaria)
- Counts of Falkenstein (Rhineland-Palatinate)
