= Vagen, Germany =

Vagen
- Ortsteil of Feldkirchen-Westerham
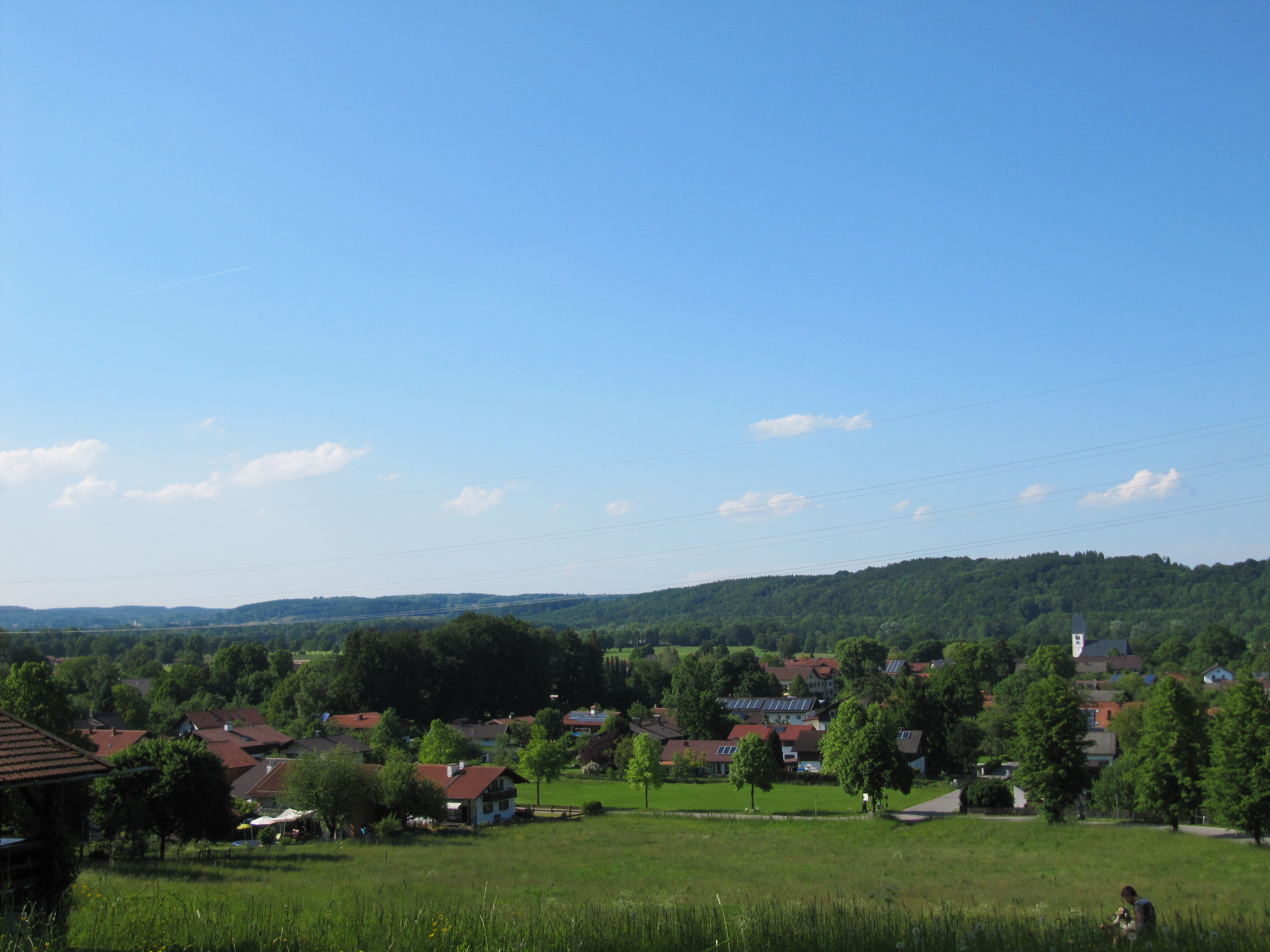
- Vagen
- Interactive map of Vagen
- Location within Germany Location within Bavaria
- Coordinates: 47°52′20″N 011°53′02″E
- Country: Germany
- State: Bavaria
- Admin. region: Oberbayern
- District: Rosenheim
- Municipality: Feldkirchen-Westerham
- Elevation: 540 m (1,770 ft)

Population (2011)
  - Total: 1,720
- Time zone: UTC+01:00 (CET)
  - Summer (DST): UTC+02:00 (CEST)
- Dialling codes: 08062
- Vehicle registration: RO

Vagen is a large village (Pfarrdorf) in the district of Rosenheim, in Bavaria, Germany. It is 2 km west of Bruckmühl. Vagen is administratively in Feldkirchen-Westerham municipality.

== History ==
In 1999 archaeological excavations revealed that Vagen was settled by at least the 5th century. The village derives its name from the Bavarian noble family of Fagana. In the High Middle Ages, it fell within the domains of the Falkensteiners. In the 12th century, Count Siboto II. von Weyarn, built a castle here overlooking the Mangfall River to the east. He called it Neuburg and it was completed by 1133. In the 14th and 15th centuries the castle fell into ruins. Locals used the stone for buildings and dug into the moraine for gravel. The last remaining stones were used to build the church in 1683, so no physical evidence remains of the castle.

Documents from the 14th and 15th centuries show Vagen with a bustling economy. Beginning in 1520 with the purchase of the Vagen Tavern, the Hafner, a bourgeois family from Münich, began buying up farms and commercial properties. The Hafners eventually became the local tax collectors. But, with the decline in the economy in the 18th century, the Hafners sold out to Franz Anton Vogt.

The Bavarians practiced a form of local justice where the village folk would run undesirables out of town. This was called haberfeldtreiben (driven to the oat field). Undesirables ranged from fallen women to usurers and con artists. In Vagen the most recently recorded haberfeldtreiben was in 1716. Information about this haberfeldtreiben was preserved because the father of the defendant sued seventeen of the village folk for assault. The case was thrown out with the court ruling that the haberfeldtreiben had been a proper use of local customary law.

In the 18th and 19th centuries Goldbach creek was harnessed to run local industry. It supported five mills and a blacksmith shop.

Before 1972, Vagen was in the municipality of Feldkirchen in the district of Bad Aibling. In 1972 it assumed its current place in the administrative structure.

== Geography ==
The village sits above the floodplain of the river Mangfall. The landscape is typically post-glacier deranged drainage, with Vagen sited upon a terminal moraine, left by the last glacier in the Vagen area, the Inn-Chiemsee glacier of the Würm glaciation. The area is scattered with longitudinal moraines called drumlins.
