= Dürnbach (Festenbach) =

River in Germany

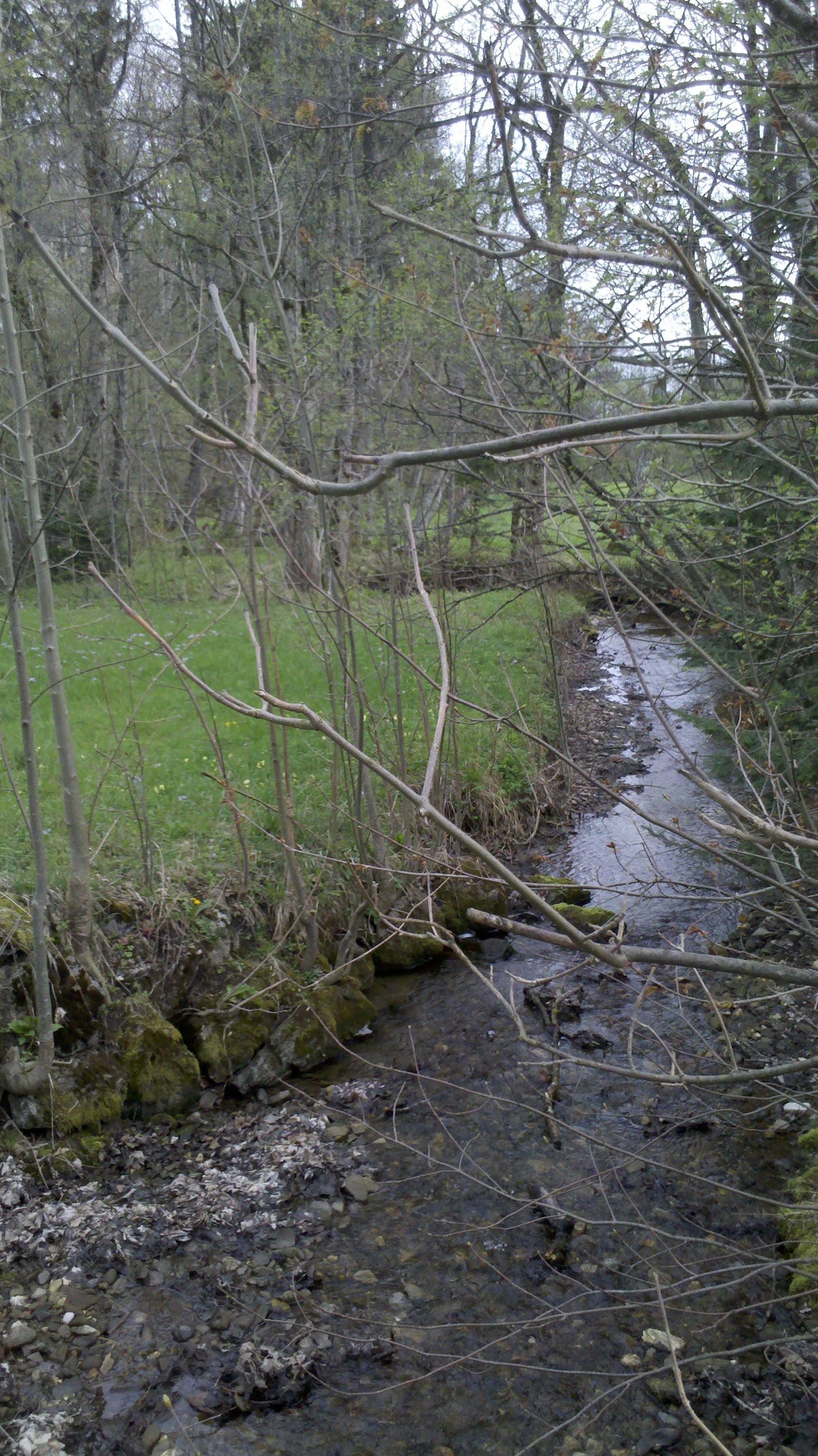

Location
- Country: Germany
- State: Bavaria

Physical characteristics
- Mouth
  - location: Festenbach
  - coordinates: 47.7704°N 11.7484°E

Basin features
- Progression: Festenbach→ Mangfall→ Inn→ Danube→ Black Sea

Dürnbach is a river of Bavaria, Germany. It is a tributary of the Festenbach.

== See also ==
- List of rivers of Bavaria
