= Codex Falkensteinensis =

Medieval manuscript; the only preserved secular urbarium from the Hohenstaufen era

- Archives of the Bavarian state
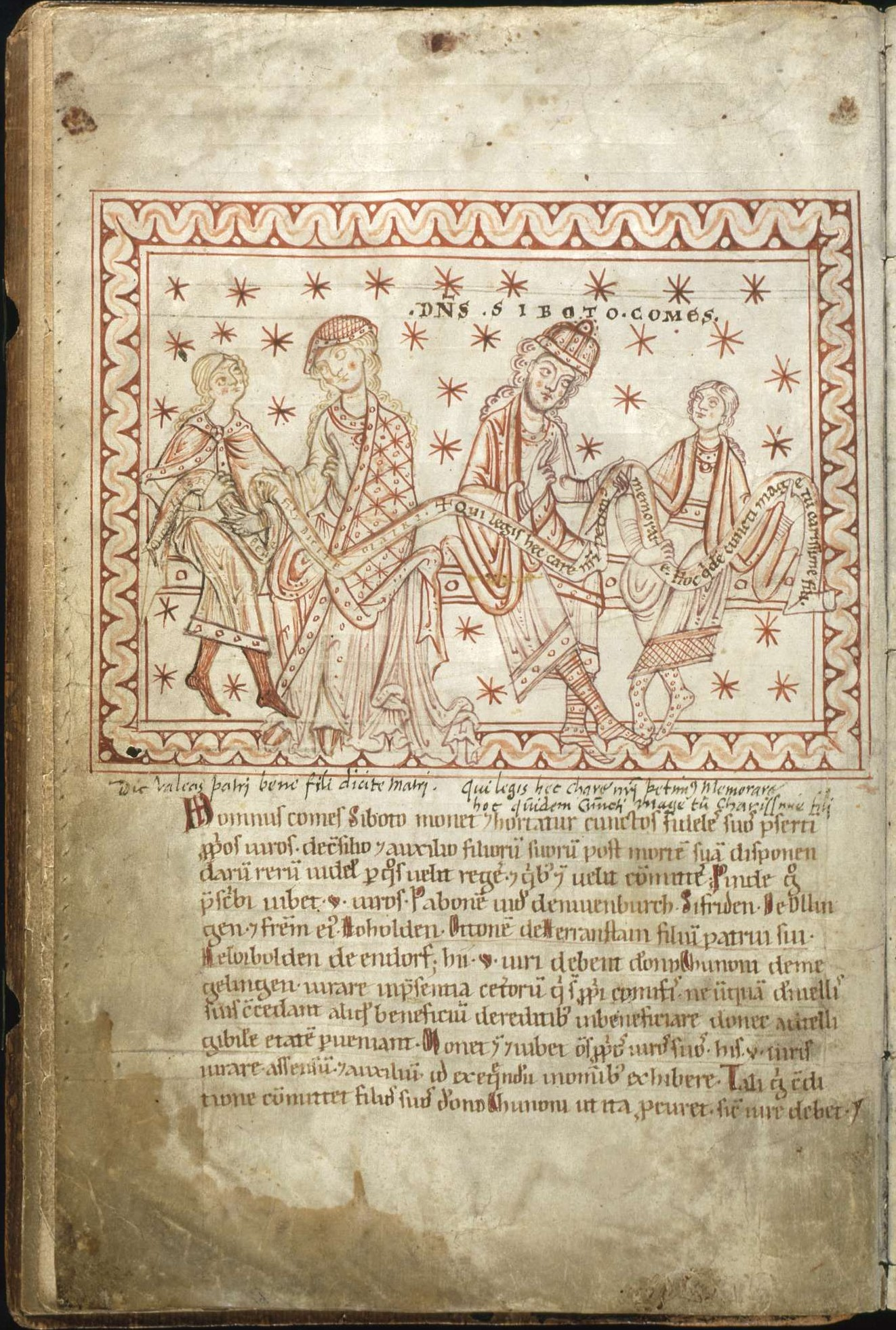
- Count's family in the manuscript
- Also known as: Codex diplomaticus Falkensteinensis; Liber traditionum comitatus Neuenburg-Falkenstein
- Date: 1166
- Place of origin: Bavaria
- Language(s): Latin (Middle High German version lost)
- Patron: Siboto IV

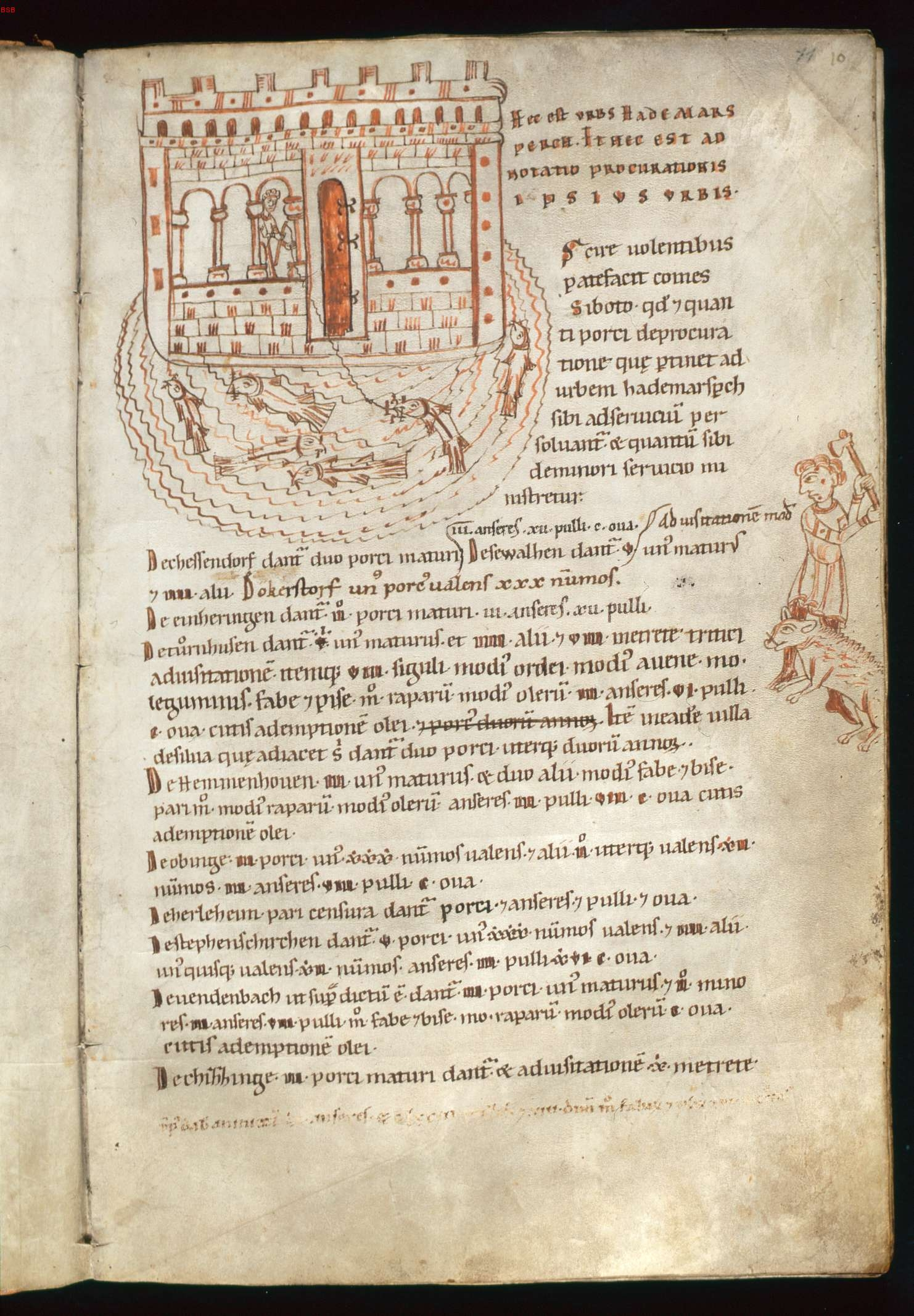
Hartmannsberg castle with resident fishing in the moat

The Codex Falkensteinensis (also referred to as Codex diplomaticus Falkensteinensis or Liber traditionum comitatus Neuenburg-Falkenstein) is an important medieval manuscript. It was written in 1166 as a feud directory and urbarium by Canons of the Herrenchiemsee monastery, commissioned by the Counts of Neuburg-Falkenstein. Composed at the Neuburg castle near Vagen it is considered the only preserved secular codex from the Hohenstaufen era, the oldest extant book of conveyances from a secular lordship and the oldest European family archive. The original Latin version is preserved in the archives of the Bavarian state, a second Middle High German edition is lost.

== Historical and legal significance ==
The Codex Falkensteinensis, written in medieval Latin, lists possessions and estates of the Counts of Falkenstein, covering a large area between the Bavarian Mangfall valley, today's South Tyrol and Lower Austria, in addition to the dynasty's core countries in the Inn and Vils valleys. Intending to take part in Friedrich Barbarossa's fourth Italian expedition, Siboto IV ordered to draft the manuscript, with the aim to secure the property situation for his under-age children, should he perish during the campaign.

Originally, a second edition was written in German, in addition to the Latin version. It was cited by several historic authors, but was lost towards the end of the 17th century.

The oldest part of the Codex Falkensteinensis includes provisions for the guardianship of the count's children and a directory of fiefs and allodial property of the Falkenstein lineage. Later additions that were added until about 1193 contain legal and historical notes and lists of revenue and harvest.

Notably, the codex also includes recordings of an ecclesial penance, a medieval medicinal formula and a hint to a solar eclipse in 1133.

A unique feature of the manuscript is that it contained the copy of a clandestine letter of Siboto IV to his lower-Austrian vassal Ortwin von Merkenstein, in which he ordered to eliminate his enemy Rudolf von Piesting. It remains unclear if Siboto ordered a murder or blinding, or if the letter is forgery in order to disparage Siboto. An additional option is that the letter was written but kept by Siboto in order to use it as leverage towards his lower-Austrian relatives.

== Artistic aspects ==
The Codex diplomaticus Falkensteinensis is richly endowed with illustrations and miniatures that are influenced by the transition from byzantine art to European medieval illumination.

The first pages of the manuscript are illustrated with a pictorial representation of the count's family, showing Siboto IV, his wife Hildegard von Mödling and his sons Kuno and Siboto V. This illustration is considered to be one of the oldest family portraits. Four additional miniatures depict the major castles of the lineage, the Neuburg castle, the Falkenstein castle, Hartmannsberg and Hernstein. Other illustrations portray animals and farmers.
