= Glonn (disambiguation) =

Glonn is a market town in the Ebersberg district in Upper Bavaria, Germany.

Glonn may also refer to:

- Glonn (Amper), a river of Upper Bavaria, Germany, tributary of the Amper
- Glonn (Mangfall), a river of Upper Bavaria, Germany, tributary of the Mangfall
