= Brunau (disambiguation) =

Brunau may refer to:

- Brunau, a village in the borough of Kalbe (Milde) in the district of Altmark Salzwedel in Saxony-Anhalt (Germany)
- Brunau (Luhe), a tributary of the Luhe on the Lüneburg Heath in the district of Soltau-Fallingbostel (Germany)
- Brunau (Örtze), a tributary of the Örtze on the Lüneburg Heath in the district of Celle (Germany)
- Brunau, an area of common land in the south of Zürich (Switzerland)

== See also ==
- Braunau (disambiguation)
