= List of solar eclipses in the Middle Ages =

This is a list of selected solar eclipses in the Middle Ages, in particular those with historical significance.

== Historically significant solar eclipses ==
Date of eclipse	Time (UTC)			Type	Central Duration	Eclipse Path	Notes
Date of eclipse	Start	Mid	End	Type	Central Duration	Eclipse Path	Notes
January 27, 632	-	06:38	-	annular	01m40s	Arabian Peninsula, India, China	Occurred at the time of the death of Ibrahim, a 21-month-old son of Muhammad
July 5, 810	-		-			Probably observable only in the Southern Hemisphere	The solar eclipse of July 5 (sometimes erroneously reported as June 7), as well as the eclipse of November 30 a few months later, caused Charlemagne to write a letter in 811 to Waldo, abbot of the Abbey of Saint-Denis in Paris, asking the Irish monk Dungal, then resident at the abbey, to analyze the eclipses; he did so, relying on Roman astronomy authorities such as Pliny the Elder's Natural History and Macrobiuss Commentary on the Dream of Scipi. Charlemagne had learned of the July 810 eclipse from a visiting bishop from Constantinople. Charlemagne may have been disturbed by the July 810 eclipse's coincidence with the death of his son Pepin of Italy, on July 8, 810.
November 30, 810	-	12:02	-	total	01m08s	Western Europe	Some scholars posit that the Rök runestone inscriptions were influenced by the 810 solar eclipses (as well as other events, such as the solar storm in 775 and an unusually cold summer that year, in addition to the memory of the volcanic winter of 536), and interpret the runestone as predicting a climate crisis of extreme winter, perhaps the fimbulvetr, which the Norse believed to presage Ragnarök, the end of the world.
July 19, 939	-	-	-	total	03m28s	Southern Eurasia	The eclipse began in the Atlantic, crossed the Iberian Peninsula from Cape San Vicente to Cape Rosas to enter Principality of Hungary, Sea of Azov, Greater Khorasan and North Indian, ending in Nusantara. The chronicle of the eclipse is not because of the eclipse itself, but because of the surprise it provokes in the two opposing sides in the Battle of Simancas
July 20, 966	-	17:15	-	total	02m55s	Arctic, Scandinavia, Poland	Partially visible across Western Europe. Andrew of Wyntoun connected the eclipse with the assassination of Dub, King of Scotland.
August 2, 1133	-	12:08	-	total	04m38s	Canada, Greenland, Scotland, Netherlands, Germany, Byzantium, Israel	Also referred to as King Henry's Eclipse. Believed to be a bad omen for several political events and disasters. Mentioned in the Peterborough Chronicle, the Annales Halesbrunnenses and the Codex diplomaticus Falkensteinensis.
August 22, 1142	-	20:14	-	total	03m36s	North America	Visible over Pre-Columbian New York, happened during the formation of the Iroquois confederacy.
April 21, 1186	-	05:32	-	partial		Bulgaria, Hungary	This eclipse allowed the Byzantines, led by Isaac II Angelos, to make a counteroffensive against rebels attacking Thrace. Also recorded in the Laurentian Codex; the description there is the first record of solar prominences.
March 3, 1337	-	"fourth to the seventh hour"	-			Black Sea	This eclipse terrified the inhabitants of Trebizond, inciting them to rebel against their emperor Basil, throwing rocks at the citadel of the Emperor.
May 5, 1361	-	"fifth hour of the day"	-	total	"an hour and a half"	Black Sea	This eclipse was so full that an eye-witness claimed he could see the stars in the sky. The Emperor Alexios III and his retinue were induced to make a pilgrimage to Soumela Monastery, where they performed "many supplications and prayers."

== Statistics ==
=== Longest total eclipses ===
Below is a list of all total eclipses longer than 7 minutes that occurred between the 5th and 15th centuries.

Date of eclipse	Central Duration	Reference
23 May 681	07m10s	
3 June 699	07m17s	
13 June 717	07m15s	
25 June 735	07m02s	
29 May 1044	07m12s	
9 June 1062	07m20s	
20 June 1080	07m18s	
1 July 1098	07m05s	

=== Solar eclipses by century ===
Century	No.	Eclipse type				Longest eclipse (Note: All eclipses listed are annular. See § Longest total eclipses above for longest total eclipses)		Two-eclipse months (Note: Months listed in this column had two eclipses occur during that time period)	Ref.
Century	No.	Partial (P)	Annular (A)	Total (T)	Hybrid (H)	Length	Date	Two-eclipse months	Ref.
5th	233	80	84	67	2	10m43s	12 November 486	August 463	
6th	251	93	87	65	6	10m41s	22 November 504	August 528, July 539, May 542	
7th	251	90	90	67	4	10m31s	17 December 689	April 618, March 629	
8th	233	77	88	66	2	10m35s	18 December 716		
9th	222	78	74	64	6	08m35s	21 December 884		
10th	227	76	84	66	1	10m14s	1 November 989		
11th	241	84	90	61	6	11m29s	14 December 1061	May 1063	
12th	250	92	82	61	15	10m27s	16 January 1116	March 1150	
13th	246	87	81	60	18	11m44s	29 December 1274	March 1215	
14th	229	76	75	54	24	11m18s	20 January 1311		
15th	222	77	65	61	19	09m31s	1 December 1415		
