= Leitzach =

River in Germany

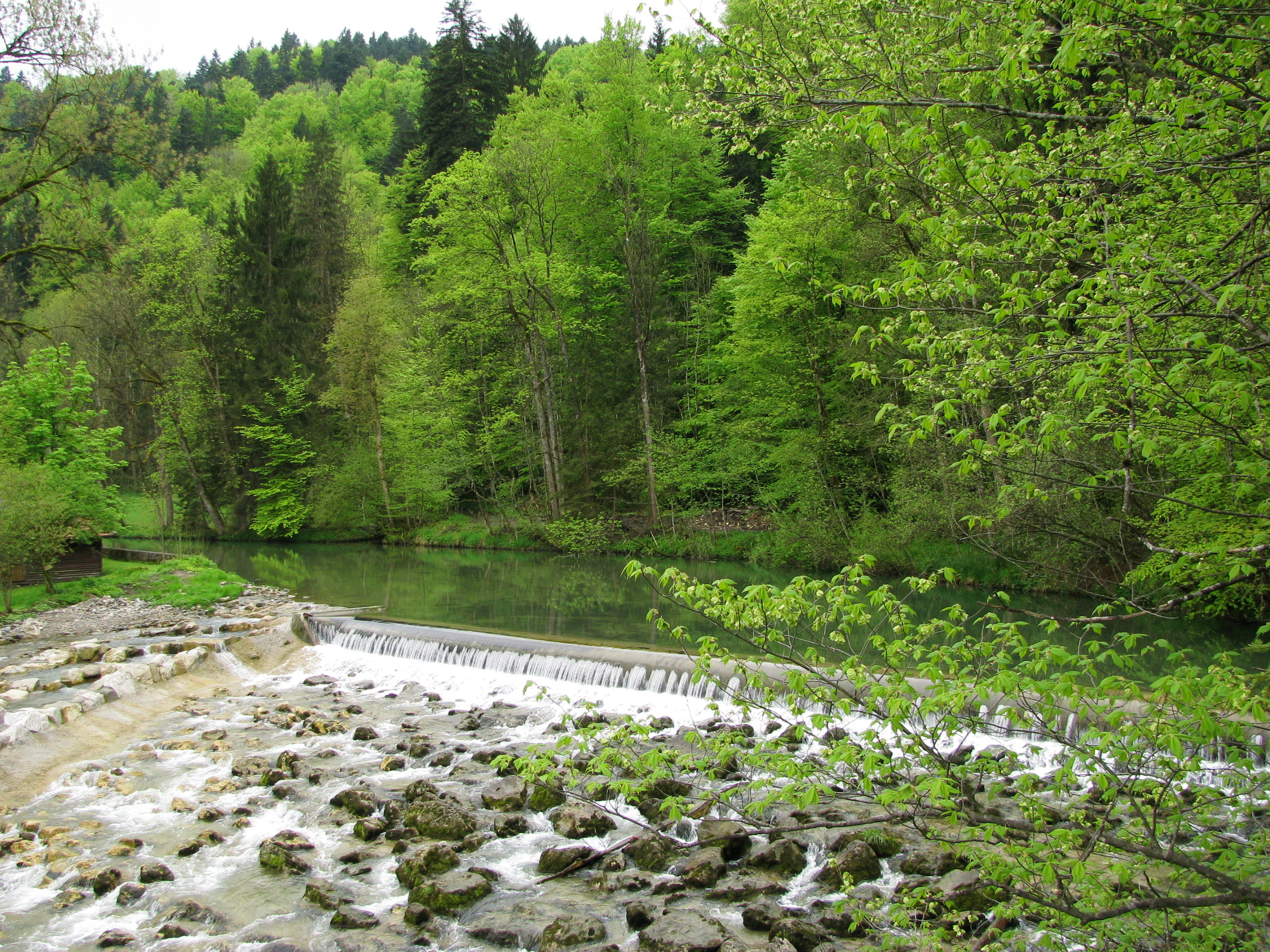
- The Leitzach in Miesbach

Location
- Country: Germany
- State: Bavaria

Physical characteristics
- Mouth
  - location: Mangfall
  - coordinates: 47.8907°N 11.8363°E
- Length: 45.9 km (28.5 mi)
- Basin size: 204 km^{2} (79 sq mi)

Basin features
- Progression: Mangfall→ Inn→ Danube→ Black Sea

Leitzach (German pronunciation: [ˈlaɪtsax]) is a river of Bavaria, Germany. It flows into the Mangfall near Feldkirchen-Westerham.

== See also ==
- List of rivers of Bavaria
