= Science Progress =

Science Progress may refer:

- Science Progress, a scientific journal (1894–1898)
- Science Progress in the Twentieth Century, a scientific journal published by John Murray, London (1906–1916)
- Science Progress, a scientific journal (1916–1919)
- Science Progress in the Twentieth Century, a quarterly journal of scientific work & thought (1919–1933)
- Science Progress, a scientific journal published by Science Reviews Ltd., London (1933–2017), ISSNs 0036-8504, 2047-7163
- Science Progress, a scientific journal meanwhile published by SAGE Publishing, ISSNs 0036-8504, 2047-7163
- Science Progress (Center for American Progress), an internet publication since 2007

== See also ==
- Scientific progress
- 8th century in science
- 11th century in science
- 19th century in science
- 20th century in science
