= House of Falkenstein (Bavaria) =

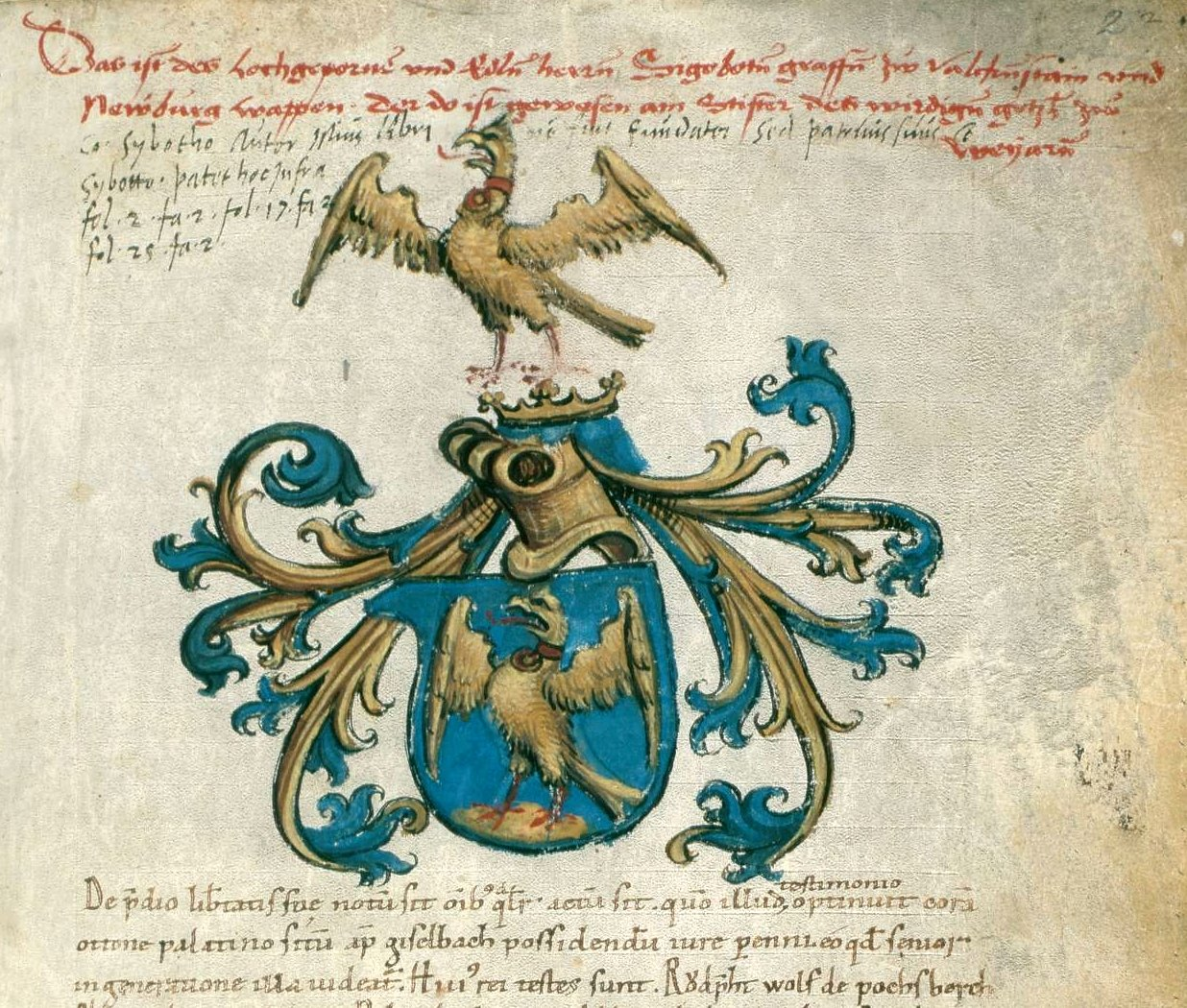
Falkenstein coat of arms, Codex Falkensteinensis (1166)

The counts of Falkenstein (from 1125 referred to as counts of Falkenstein-Neuburg) were a medieval noble dynasty from Bavaria. The family flourished under the rule of the Hohenstaufen emperors.

== Properties ==
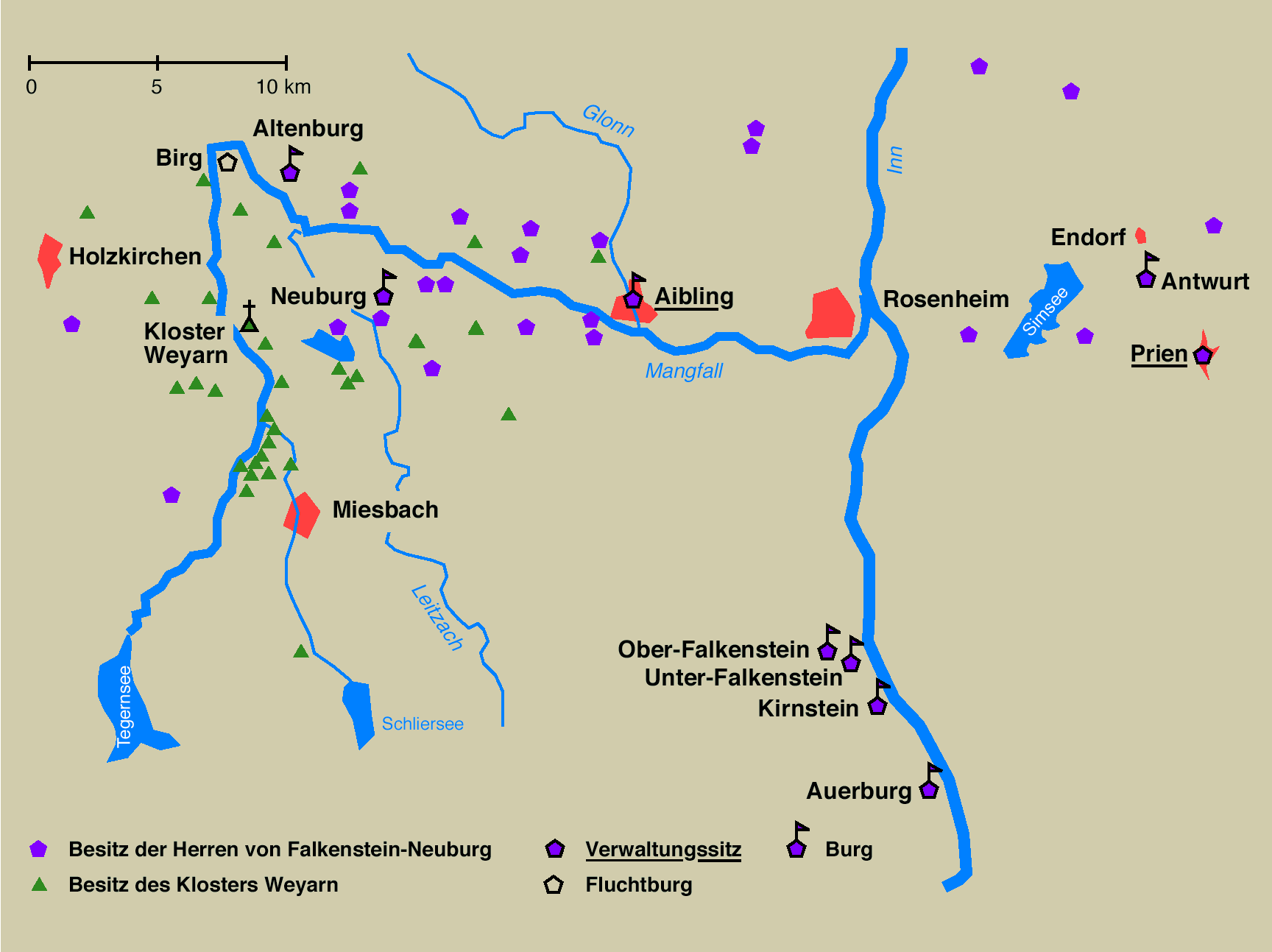
Possessions of the Neuburg-Falkenstein dynasty and Weyarn Abbey on the Inn and Mangfall rivers, c. 1200

The counts of Falkenstein had their oldest possessions in the upper Vils valley near Taufkirchen and the valley of the Inn river (in the present-day Rosenheim district of Upper Bavaria). At the heights of their powers they controlled a wide region extending into Tyrol, in the Mangfall valley, as well as in the Chiemgau region and modern Lower Austria.

According to the Codex Falkensteinensis urbarium compiled in 1166, major domiciles of the Falkenstein counts were the ancestral seat of Falkenstein über dem Inn (near Flintsbach) as well as the castles of Neuburg (near Vagen), Hartmannsberg in Chiemgau (near Bad Endorf), and Hernstein in Lower Austria. Later acquisitions included Altenburg (in present-day Feldkirchen-Westerham), Herantstein in Upper Austria, and Antwurt (now Antwort) near Bad Endorf. The counts acted as Vogt officials and judges; administrative seats were e.g. Aibling and Prien.

== History ==
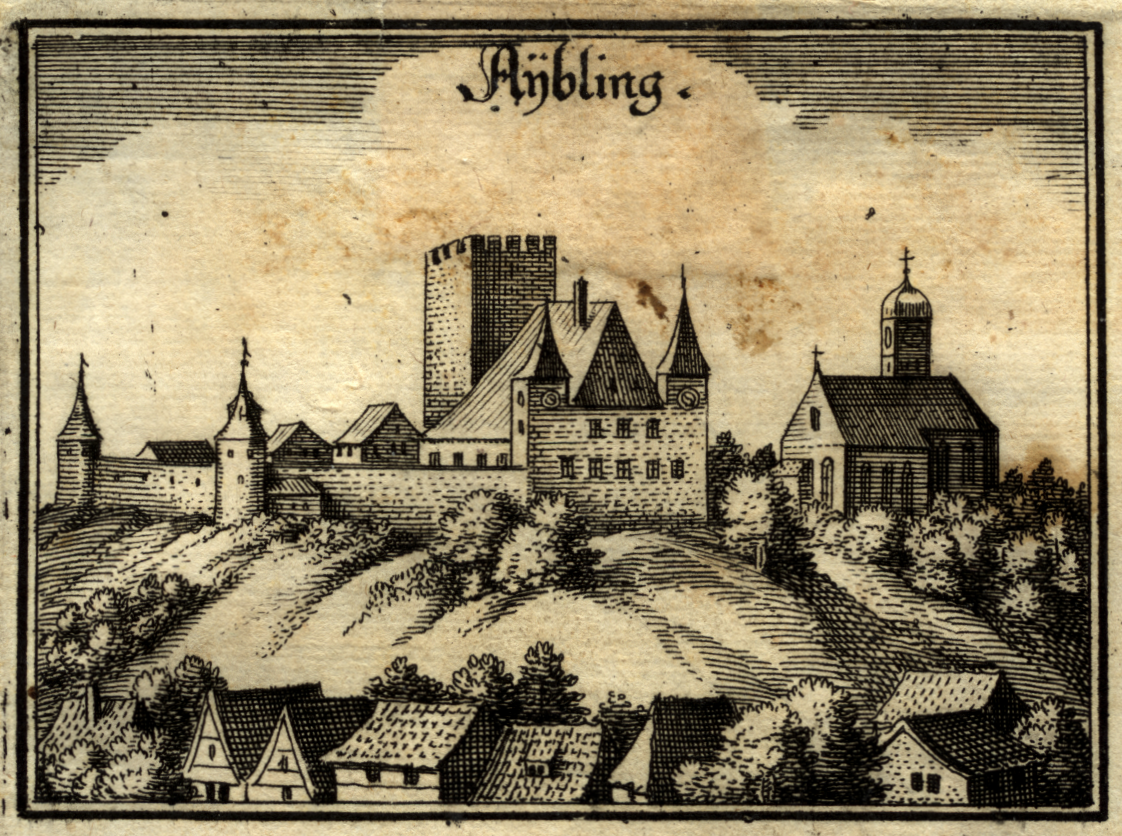
Hofberg in Aibling, castle and administrative seat of the Falkenstein counts

The original allodial possessions of the Falkensteins were located around the village of Geiselbach (today part of Taufkirchen) in the upper Vils valley. The first count mentioned in records was one Reginolt de Valchensteine in 1115, although both the Falkenstein and Neuburg lineage seem to descend from one Patto of Dilching who lived in the early 11th century. According to tradition, the Falkenstein estates in the Inn valley comprised vast lands that had been abandoned during the Hungarian invasions in the 10th century.

Throughout the 12th century, the counts of Falkenstein rapidly extended their influence. By marriage they merged with the comital Weyarn-Neuburg dynasty in 1125. Shortly afterwards, in 1133, Count Siboto II of Falkenstein founded the Augustinian monastery of Weyarn. In 1158 Archbishop Eberhard of Salzburg appointed the Falkensteins provosts of the episcopal estates in the Chiemgau region.

After the deposition of Welf duke Henry the Lion in 1180, however, when Emperor Frederick Barbarossa transferred the Bavarian duchy to Count Otto of Wittelsbach, the Falkensteiners allied with the enemies of the Wittelbach dynasty, mainly with the counts of Andechs. This marked the beginning of the forced decline of the counts of Falkenstein. The family lost its possessions during the fierce conflict of the Hohenstaufen emperor Frederick II and Pope Innocent IV in the first half of the 13th century. The lineage perished with the alleged assassination of the last count of Falkenstein in 1272. His death was perpetuated by the writer Julius Mayr (1855–1935) in his drama Sigbot von Falkenstein, alluding to the murders of the Nazi regime.

== Codex Falkensteinensis ==
Being known as the oldest feud directory and urbar, the Codex Falkensteinensis is considered as the only conserved tradition book of a secular authority. It was created in 1170 at the Falkensteiner Neuburg near Vagen.
