= Feldolling =

Coordinates: 47°53′45″N 11°51′23″E

Feldolling is a village in the municipality Feldkirchen-Westerham in the district of Rosenheim, in Bavaria, Germany. It is 22 km west of Rosenheim and about 45 km south of Munich.

== Geography ==
The church village lies on the Mangfall river and is divided into two halves by the Mangfall Valley Railway line.
