= 11th century in science =

This is a summary of the 11th century in science and technology.

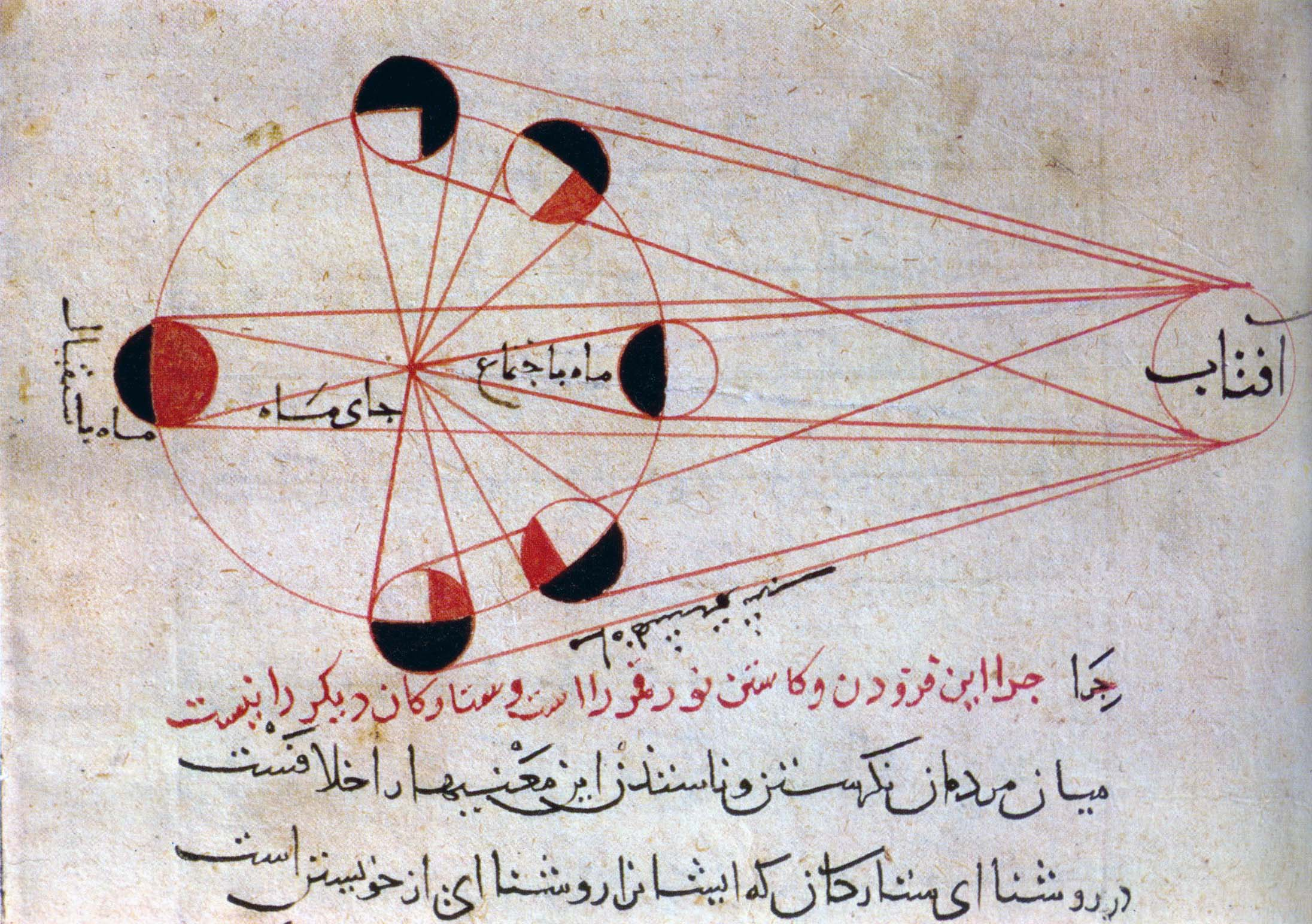
Illustration by Al-Biruni of different phases of the moon, from Kitab al-Tafhim (in Persian)

Al-Biruni is regarded as one of the greatest scholars of 11th century and was well versed in physics, mathematics, astronomy, and natural sciences, and also distinguished himself as a historian, chronologist and linguist.

Of the 146 books known to have been written by Bīrūnī, 95 were devoted to astronomy, mathematics, and related subjects like mathematical geography.

== Predicted and scheduled events ==
- List of 11th-century lunar eclipses
- List of solar eclipses in the 11th century

== Optics ==
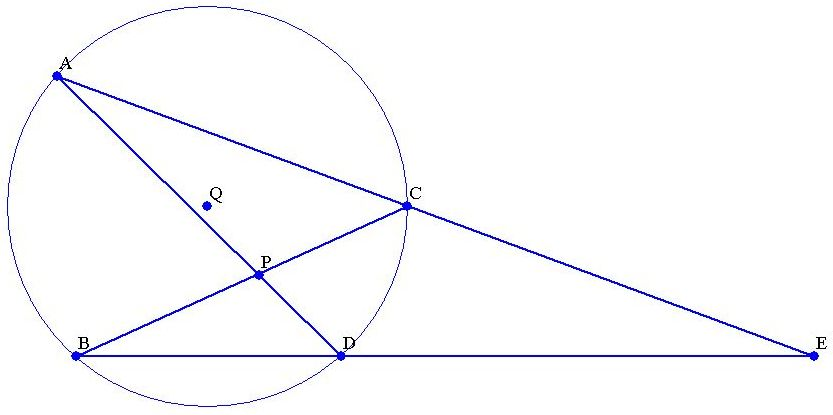
The theorem of Ibn Haytham

- Book of Optics (كتاب المناظر) was written by Alhazen.

== Geography ==
- Al-Bakri wrote about Europe, North Africa, and the Arabian Peninsula. Only two of his works have survived. His Mu'jam mā ista'jam contains a list of place names, mostly within the Arabian peninsula, with an introduction giving the geographical background.
- The Mas'udi Canon (Persian قانون مسعودي) - an extensive encyclopedia on astronomy, geography, and engineering, named after Mas'ud, son of Mahmud of Ghazni, to whom he dedicated.
- Leif Erikson claims to have made landfall at three lands in North America, one of which he names Vinland meaning the land of wine.

== Warfare ==
- A Chinese manual on warfare includes the earliest known description of gunpowder.

== Printing ==
- The concept of movable kind for printing is pioneered in China, using fired clay, but it proves impractical.

== Astronomy ==
- The Book of Instruction in the Elements of the Art of Astrology (Kitab al-tafhim li-awa’il sina‘at al-tanjim).
- The Remaining Signs of Past Centuries (Arabic الآثار الباقية عن القرون الخالية) - a comparative study of calendars of different cultures and civilizations, interlaced with mathematical, astronomical, and historical information.
- The Mas'udi Canon (Persian قانون مسعودي) - an extensive encyclopedia on astronomy, geography, and engineering, named after Mas'ud, son - a question and answer style book about mathematics and astronomy, in Arabic and Persian.
- Astronomers in China and Japan observe the explosion of the supernova which is still visible as the Crab Nebula.

== Medicines ==
- Pharmacy - about drugs and medicines.

== Surgery ==
- The first illustrated manual of surgery is written by Abul Kasim in Cordoba.

== Geology and minerals ==
- Gems (Arabic الجماهر في معرفة الجواهر) about geology, minerals, and gems, dedicated to Mawdud son of Mas'ud.

== Other ==
- Su Sung, a Buddhist monk, created in China the principle of the escapement in his tower clock worked by a water wheel.
- Three lustre decorations were developed in Syria between the 11th century and 13th century. These include Tell Minis (a yellow-orange color), Raqqa (a red-brown color) and Damascus (a yellow-brown color).

== Births ==
Record keeping was not great at the time, so the births of significant figures in science in the 11th century are primarily unknown.

== Deaths ==
Record keeping was not great at the time, so the deaths of significant figures in science in the 11th century are primarily unknown.

== See also ==
- Science in the medieval Islamic world
