= Moosbach (Mangfall) =

River in Bavaria, Germany

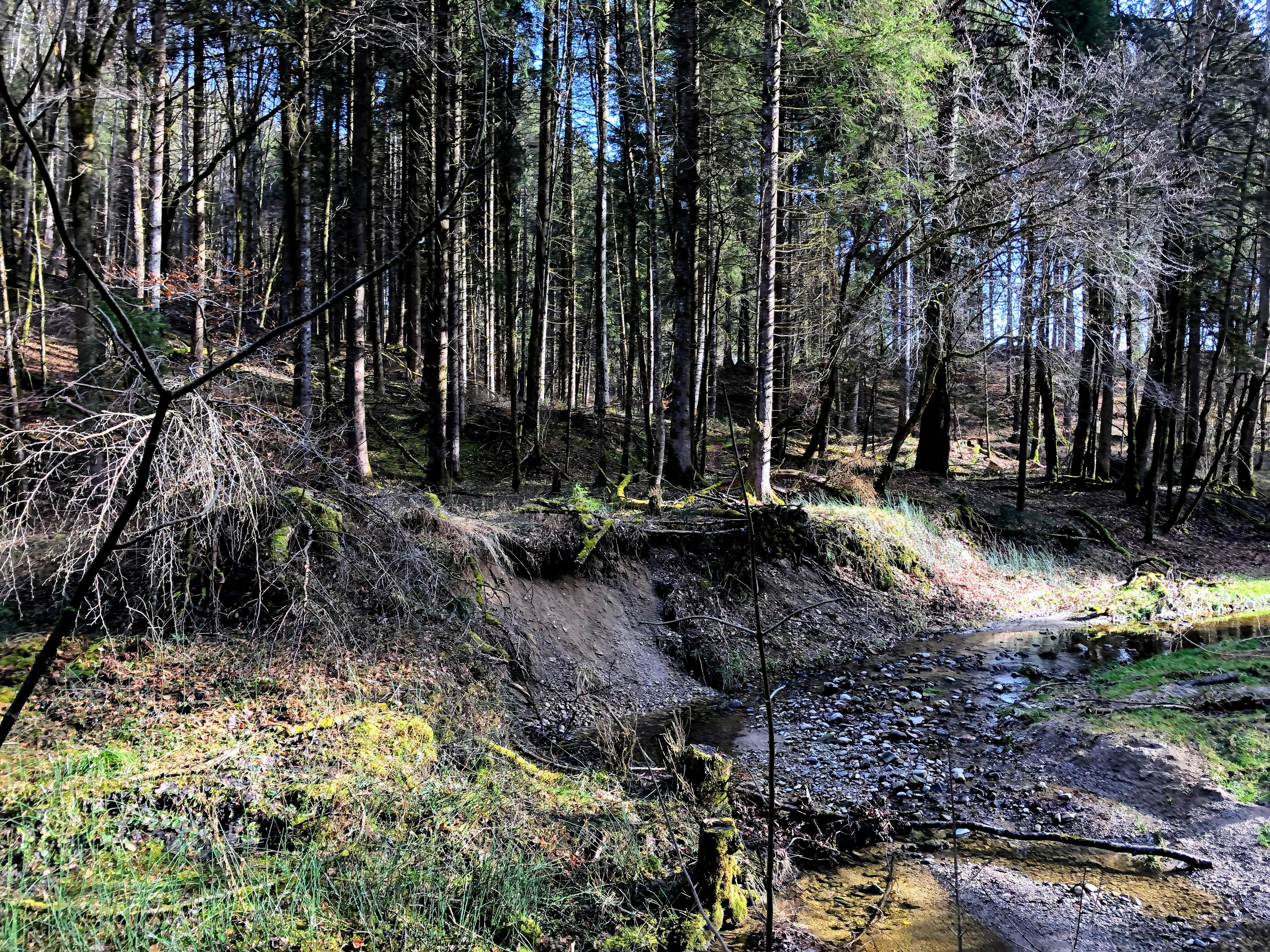
- The Moosbach close to Standkirchen (part of Weyarn)

Location
- Country: Germany
- States: Bavaria

Physical characteristics
- Mouth
  - location: Mangfall
  - coordinates: 47.8896°N 11.7869°E

Basin features
- Progression: Mangfall→ Inn→ Danube→ Black Sea

Moosbach (German pronunciation: [ˈmoːsbax]) is a river of Bavaria, Germany. It is the natural outflow of the lake Seehamer See, and flows into the Mangfall near Valley.

The Moosbach has its origin at the west end of the lake Seehamer See since the damming between the years 1911 and 1913, north of Kleinseeham (a part of Weyarn). The stream runs along the edge of a raised bog to Bruck (Weyarn), then continues over grassland north of Wattersdorf (Weyarn) to the Bundesautobahn 8. After crossing it, the Moosbach continues in a northern direction until it flows into the valley of the Mangfall north of Fentbach (Weyarn). The Moosbach merges as a right tributary into the Mangfall south of Unterdarching (Valley). In the estuary area lies the Celtic Fentbach-Schanze. The stream is 7.31 kilometers long with a catchment area of 8.08 km².

== See also ==
- List of rivers of Bavaria
