= Seehamer See =

Lake in Bavaria, Germany

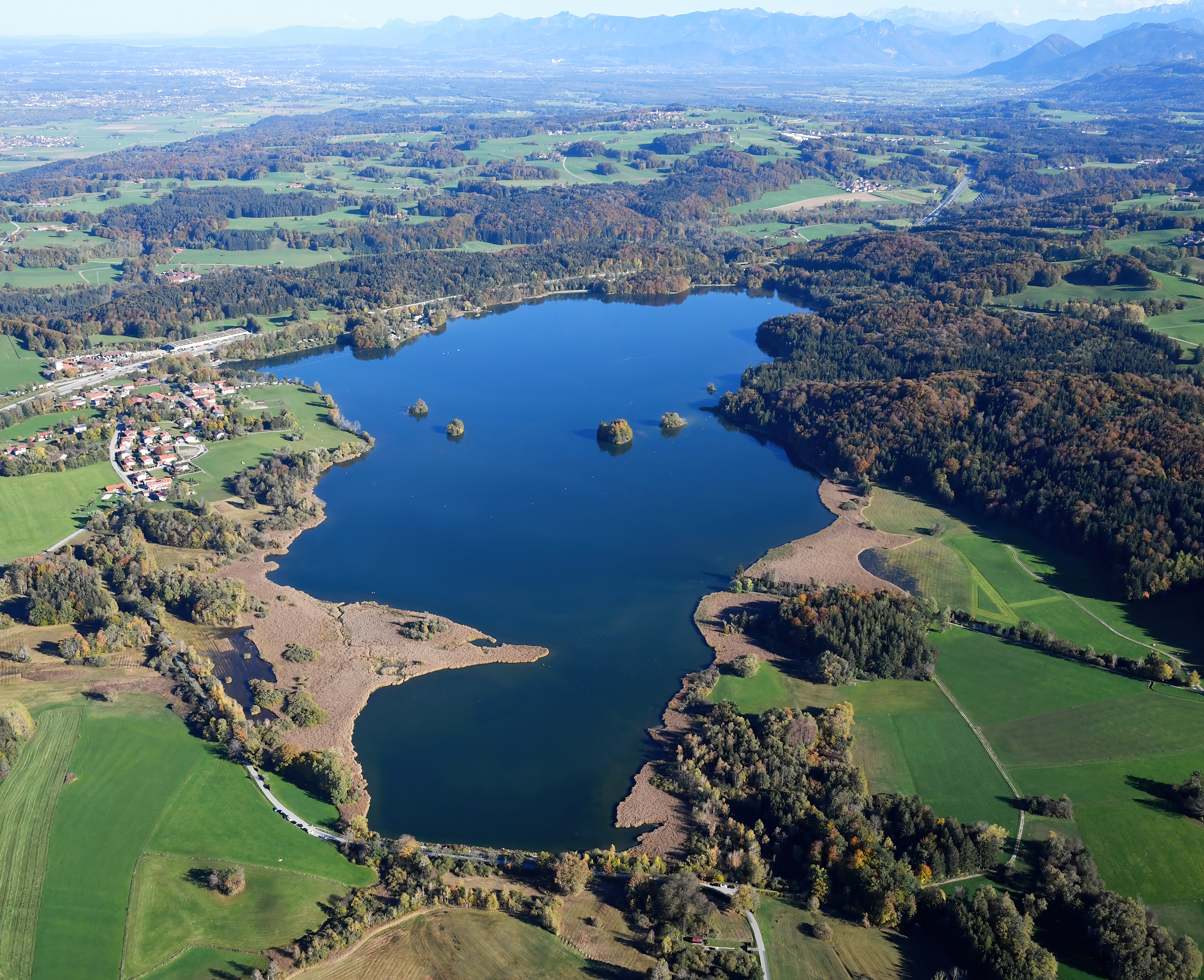

- Location within Bavaria
- Location: Alpine foothills, Bavaria
- Coordinates: 47°51′0″N 11°51′22″E
- Primary inflows: Mangfall, Schlierach, Leitzach (artificial)
- Primary outflows: Moosbach
- Basin countries: Germany
- Surface area: 1.47 km^{2} (0.57 sq mi)
- Max. depth: 22 m (72 ft)
- Surface elevation: 653 m (2,142 ft)

Seehamer See is a lake in the Alpine foothills, Bavaria, Germany. At an elevation of 653 m, its surface area is 1.47 km^{2}.

== See also ==
- List of lakes in Bavaria

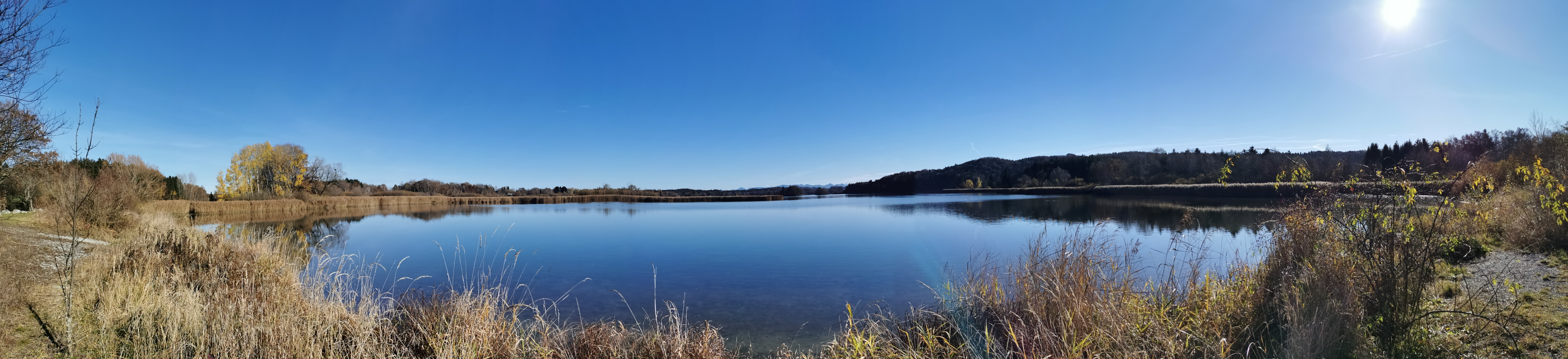
