= Schlierach =

River in Germany

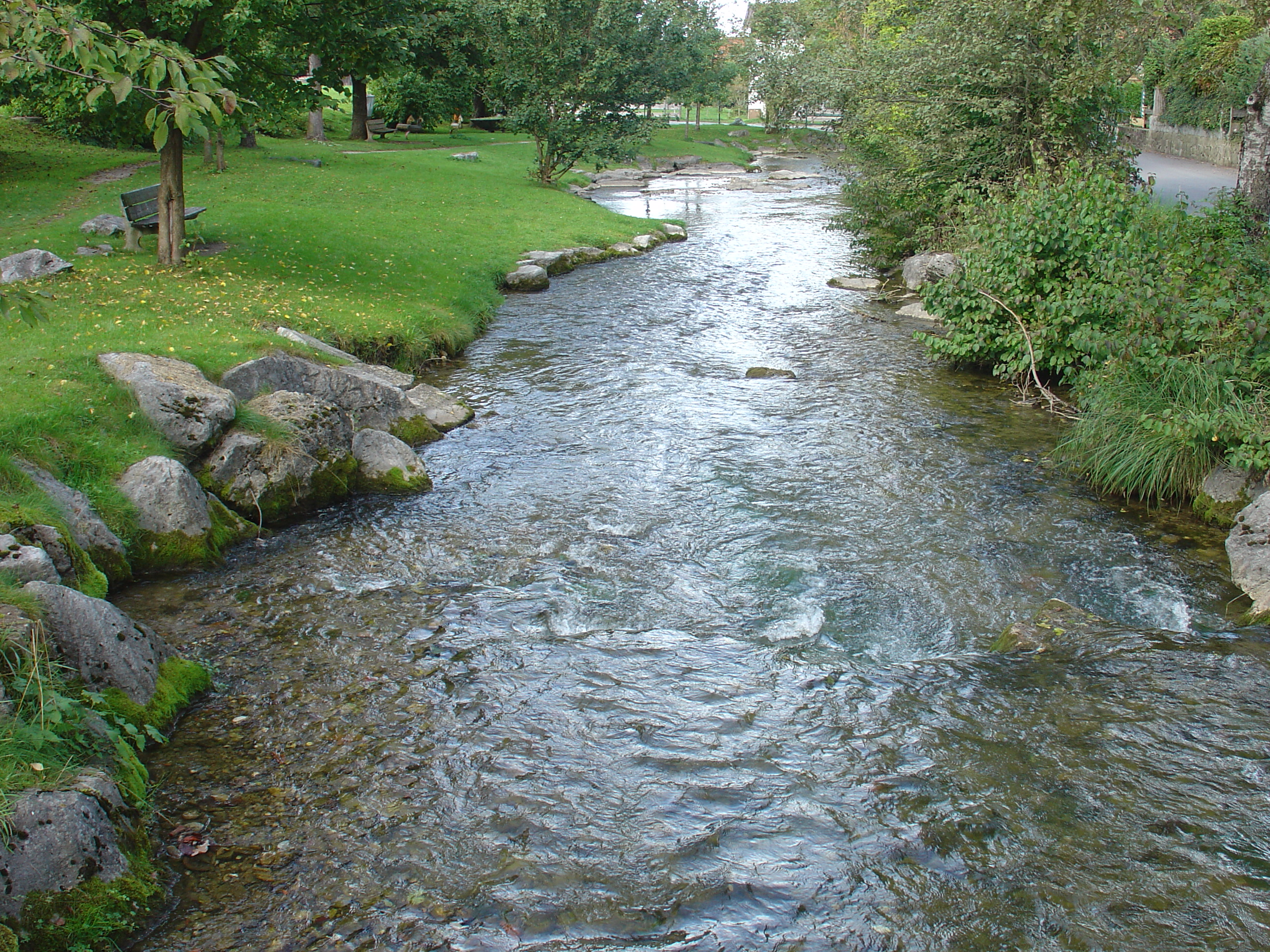
- The Schlierach in Hausham

Location
- Country: Germany
- State: Bavaria

Physical characteristics
- Source
  - location: Schliersee
- Mouth
  - location: Mangfall
  - coordinates: 47.8248°N 11.8109°E
- Length: 13.7 km (8.5 mi)

Basin features
- Progression: Mangfall→ Inn→ Danube→ Black Sea

Schlierach is a river of Bavaria, Germany. It is the outflow of the Schliersee, and flows into the Mangfall near Weyarn.

== See also ==
- List of rivers of Bavaria
