= Braunau =

Braunau may refer to:

== Places ==
- Braunau am Inn District, Austria
  - Braunau am Inn, a municipality
- Braunau (river), in Bavaria, Germany
- Braunau, Switzerland
- Broumov, Czech Republic, also known as "Braunau" in German
- New Braunau, a village in Puerto Varas, Chile

== Other uses ==
- Braunau in Rohr Abbey, a Benedictine monastery in Rohr in Niederbayern, Bavaria, Germany
- Braunau (meteorite), a meteorite fall in Východočeský kraj, Czech Republic in 1847
- FC Braunau, a football club based in Brannau am Inn
