= Schliersee (lake) =

Lake in Schliersee, Bavaria, Germany

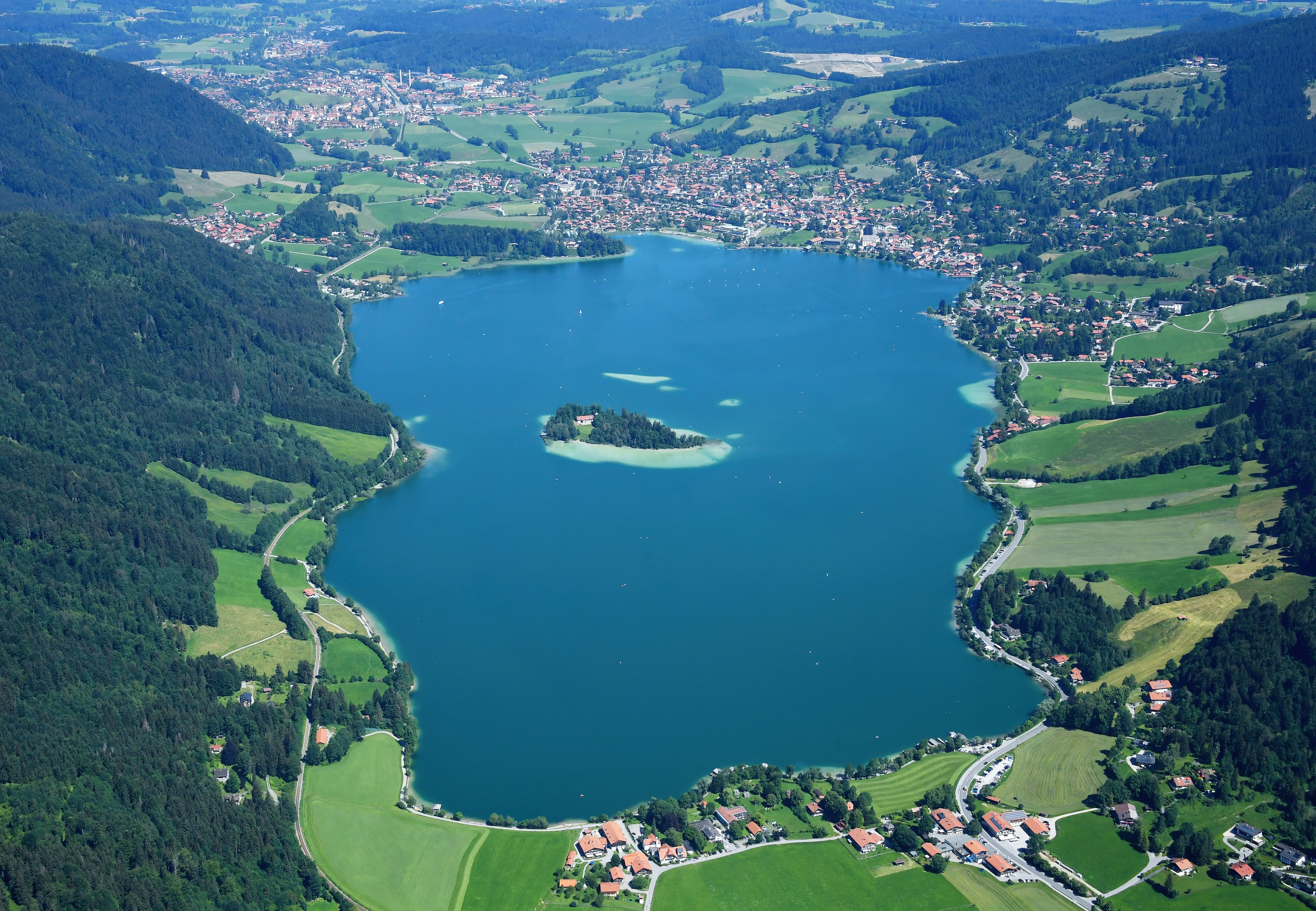
- Aerial view of the Schliersee from the south

- Location within Bavaria
- Location: Upper Bavaria
- Coordinates: 47°43′19″N 11°51′45″E
- Primary outflows: Schlierach
- Basin countries: Germany
- Max. length: 2.3 km (1.4 mi)
- Max. width: 1.3 km (0.81 mi)
- Surface area: 2.241 km^{2} (0.865 sq mi)
- Average depth: 20 m (66 ft)
- Max. depth: 40 m (130 ft)
- Surface elevation: 777 m (2,549 ft)
- Islands: 1 (Wörth island)
- Settlements: Schliersee

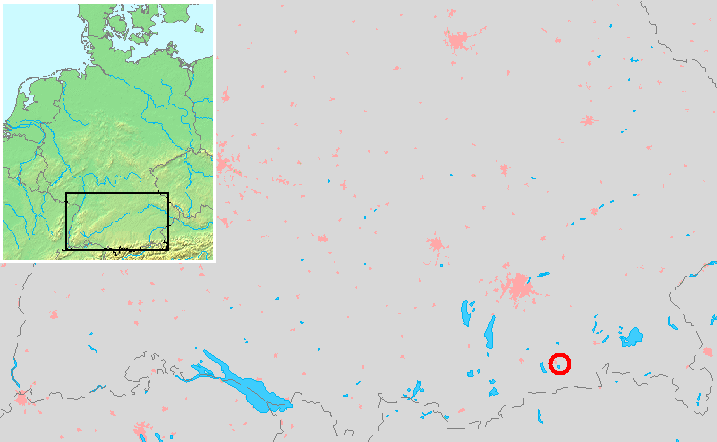
Location within Germany and Bavaria

Schliersee (German pronunciation: [ˈʃliːɐ̯zeː]) is a natural lake in Upper Bavaria in the Bavarian Alps. It is located next to the small town of Schliersee in the Miesbach district.

The lake has a surface of 2.241 square kilometres (0.865 sq mi) at an elevation of 777 metres (2,549 ft) AMSL, expanding 2.3 kilometres (1.4 mi) by 1.3 kilometres (0.81 mi) maximum. The average depth is 20 metres (66 ft) The maximum depth is 40 metres (130 ft). The only island is Wörth island, located almost in the middle of the lake.

The lake is named for the monastery Kloster Schliersee ("Sliersee"), established in 779 at Kirchbichl nearby Westenhofen.

== See also ==
- List of lakes in Bavaria
