= Mühlbach (Mangfall) =

River in Germany

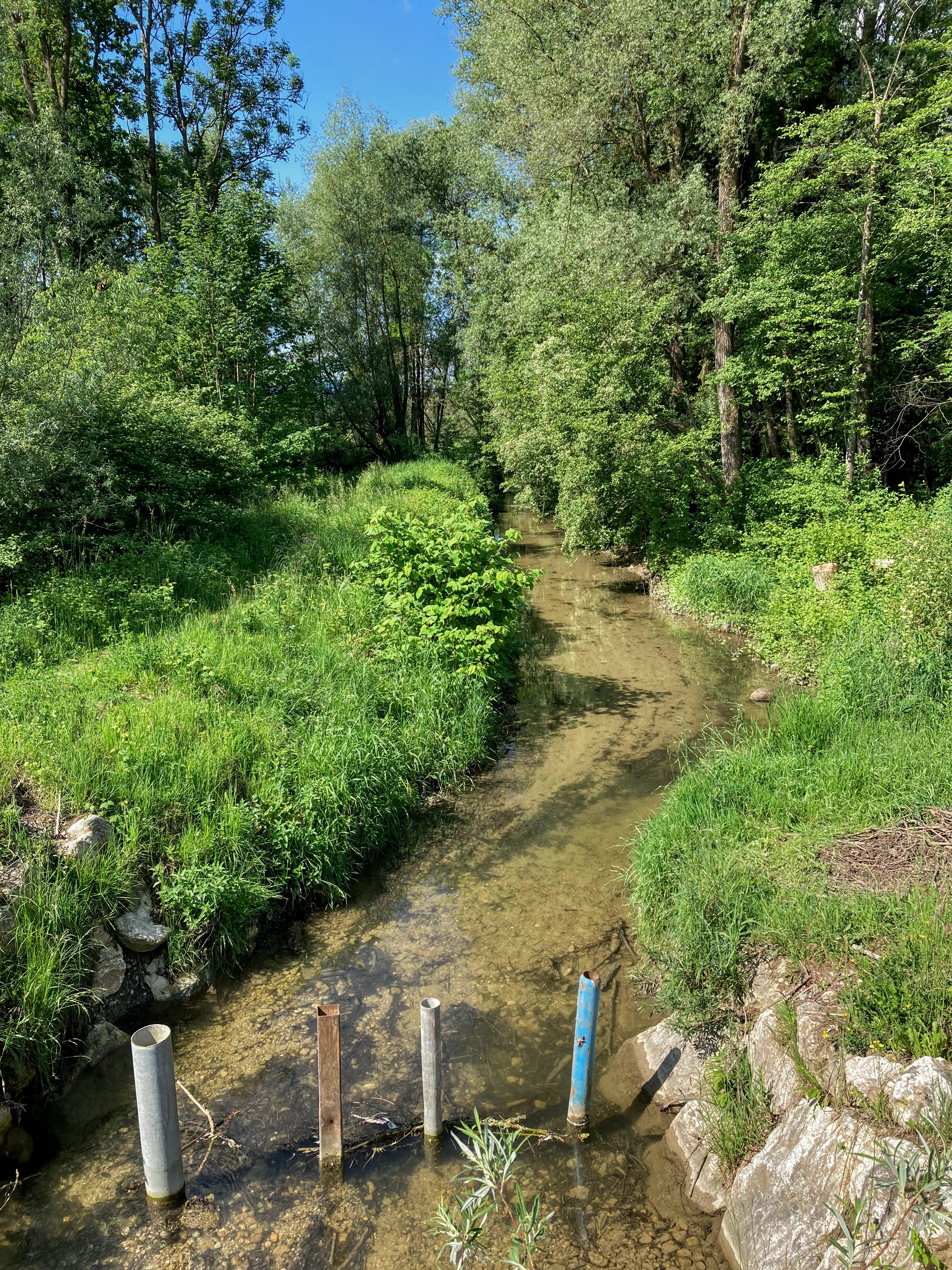
- The Mühlbach

Location
- Country: Germany
- State: Bavaria

Physical characteristics
- Mouth
  - location: Mangfall
  - coordinates: 47.8536°N 12.0164°E
- Length: 13.2 km (8.2 mi)

Basin features
- Progression: Mangfall→ Inn→ Danube→ Black Sea

Mühlbach is a river of Bavaria, Germany. It is also called Goldbach. It is a right tributary of the Mangfall near Bad Aibling.

== See also ==
- List of rivers of Bavaria
