= Kolbermoor =

- Town
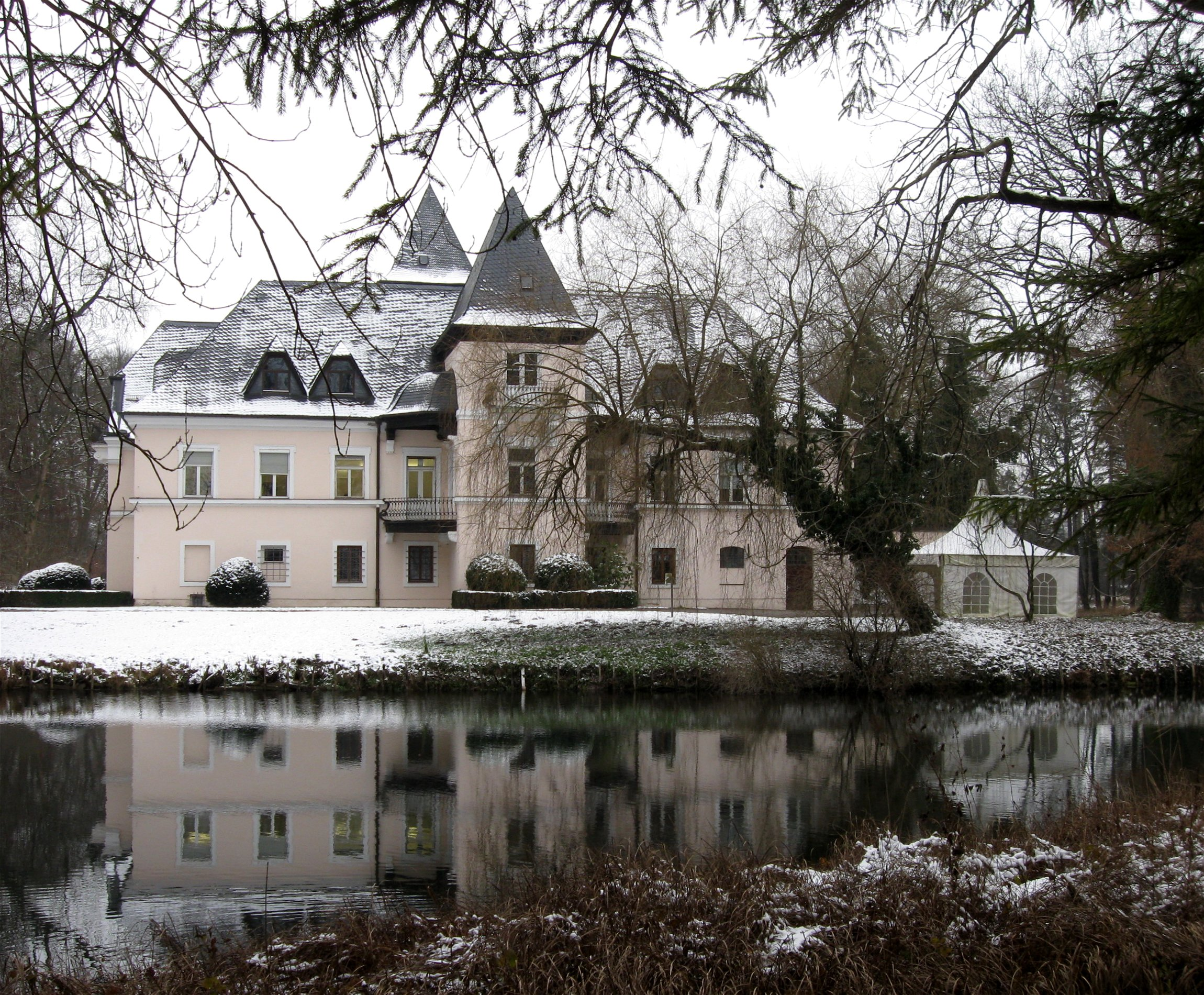
- Pullach Castle

- Coat of arms

- Location of Kolbermoor within Rosenheim district
- Interactive map of Kolbermoor
- Location within Germany Location within Bavaria
- Coordinates: 47°51′N 12°04′E
- Country: Germany
- State: Bavaria
- Admin. region: Upper Bavaria
- District: Rosenheim

Government
  - Mayor (2020–26): Peter Kloo (SPD)

Area
  - Total: 19.83 km^{2} (7.66 sq mi)
- Elevation: 461 m (1,512 ft)

Population (2025-12-31)
  - Total: 19,149
  - Density: 965.7/km^{2} (2,501/sq mi)
- Time zone: UTC+01:00 (CET)
  - Summer (DST): UTC+02:00 (CEST)
- Postal codes: 83059
- Dialling codes: 08031, 08061
- Vehicle registration: RO
- Website: www.kolbermoor.de

Kolbermoor (German pronunciation: [ˈkɔlbɐmoːɐ̯]) is a town in the district of Rosenheim, in Bavaria, Germany.

It is situated 5 km west of Rosenheim on the river Mangfall.

In 1859 Kolbermoor railway stop was built for the new Bavarian Maximilian's Railway. Kolbermoor became a village in 1863 and a town in 1963.

A museum of local history and industry is located in Kolbermoor.

Kolbermoor is the birthplace of football players Paul Breitner and Bastian Schweinsteiger.

On 9 February 2016, the Bad Aibling rail accident between Kolbermoor and Bad Aibling-Kurpark to the west claimed 12 lives.
