= Solar eclipse of August 2, 1133 =

Total eclipse

- Total eclipse
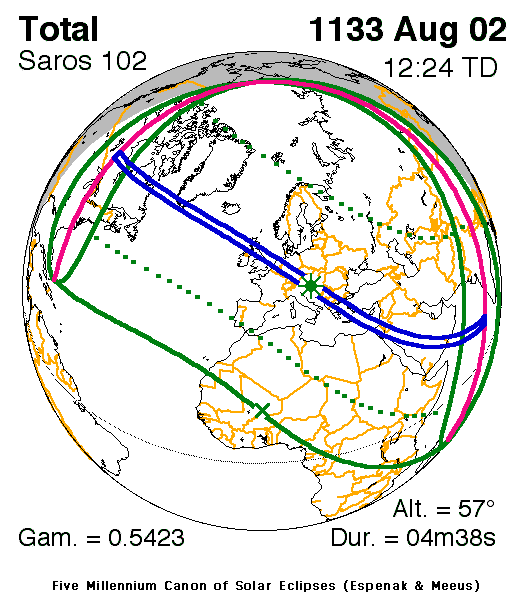
- Solar eclipse of Aug 2, 1133
- Gamma: 0.5423
- Magnitude: 1.0652

Maximum eclipse
- Duration: 278 s (4m 38s)
- Coordinates: 45.8°N 16.5°E
- Max. width of band: 252.5 km

Times (UTC)
- Greatest eclipse: 12:8:38 UT

References
- Saros: 102 (43 of 71)

A total solar eclipse, also known as King Henry's Eclipse, occurred on August 2, 1133 over North America, northwestern, central and southeastern Europe and the Middle East. The eclipse was number 43 in the Solar Saros 102 series. The eclipse was widely regarded as a bad omen in England and Germany.

== Eclipse path and details ==
The instant of the greatest eclipse took place at 12:24:22 terrestrial dynamical time (TD), which corresponds to 12:08:36 universal time (UT1). This was exactly one day after the Moon reached perigee. The Sun was during the eclipse in the constellation Leo. The synodic month in which the eclipse took place had a Brown Lunation Number of -9763.

The solar eclipse of 2 August 1133 was a comparatively long total eclipse with a duration at the greatest eclipse of 4 minutes and 38 seconds. Its eclipse magnitude was 1.0652.

Records of this eclipse have helped determine the historical rate of the deceleration of Earth's rotation.

== Public reception and coverage in literature ==
Like many other eclipses, the solar eclipse of 2 August 1133 was considered a bad omen. This perception was underscored by the fact that it coincided with the final departure of King Henry I of England to Normandy, shortly before the country was thrown into chaos and civil war. It was described by William of Malmesbury. According to him, the "hideous darkness agitated the hearts of men." One scribe described the event as "miserabilis, horribilis, nigra, mirabilis": "wretched, horrifying, black, remarkable."

In Germany, the eclipse was regarded to predict the sacking of the city of Augsburg and the massacre of its inhabitants by Duke Frederick.

The eclipse is mentioned in the Peterborough Chronicle, the Annales Halesbrunnenses, two of Cosmas's continuators (the canon of Vyšehrad and the monk of Sázava), the Codex diplomaticus Falkensteinensis and the Chronicon Scotorum.
