= Suhi Potok =

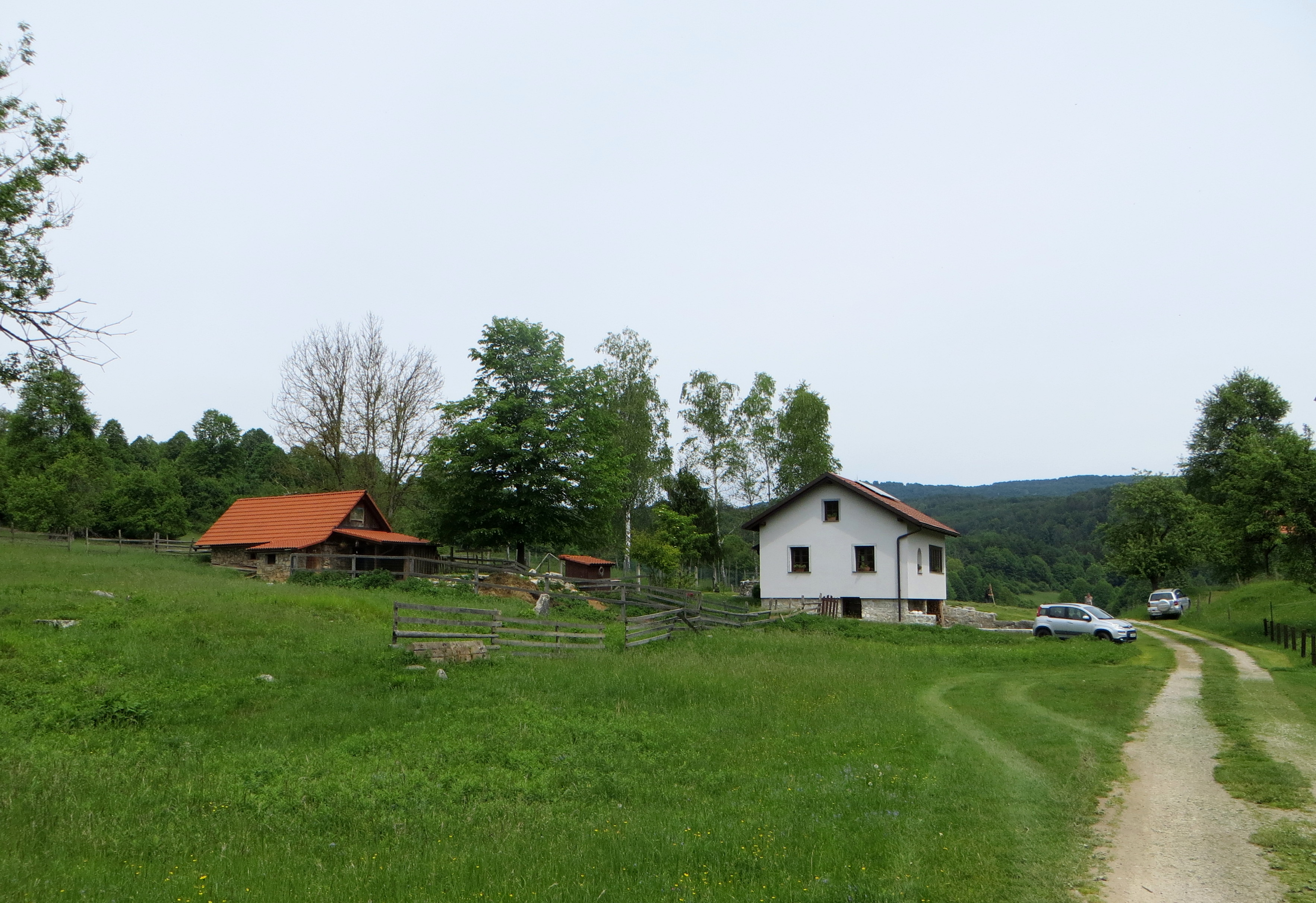

- Location in Slovenia
- Coordinates: 45°35′16.69″N 14°57′42.90″E
- Country: Slovenia
- Traditional region: Lower Carniola
- Statistical region: Southeast Slovenia
- Municipality: Kočevje

Area
  - Total: 3.56 km^{2} (1.37 sq mi)

Suhi Potok (pronounced [ˈsuːxi ˈpɔːtɔk]; formerly also Suha vas; German: Dürnbach or Durnbach; Gottscheerish: Dürnpoch) is a settlement in the Municipality of Kočevje in southern Slovenia. The area is part of the traditional region of Lower Carniola and is now included in the Southeast Slovenia Statistical Region.

== Name ==
The name Suhi Potok literally means 'dry creek'. Toponyms containing the element potok 'creek' are common in Slovenia and usually correspond to German names ending in -bach 'creek'. The obsolete Slovene name Suha vas means 'dry village'. The German name Dürnbach also literally means 'dry creek' and may be compared to similar names in Carinthia, such as the hamlet of Dürnfeld in the Municipality of Magdalensberg.

== History ==
Suhi Potok was a Gottschee German village. According to the Kočevje land registry of 1574, the village had four full farms divided into eight half-farms, corresponding to between 45 and 55 inhabitants. In 1770 there were 12 houses in the village. In 1937 the village had 13 houses and a population of 54. During the Second World War most of the village was burned down, leaving only two (out of 13) houses and the 18th-century Saint Andrew's Church. After the war, the Kočevje collective farm and forestry company took over management of the village's fields and pastures.

== Church ==
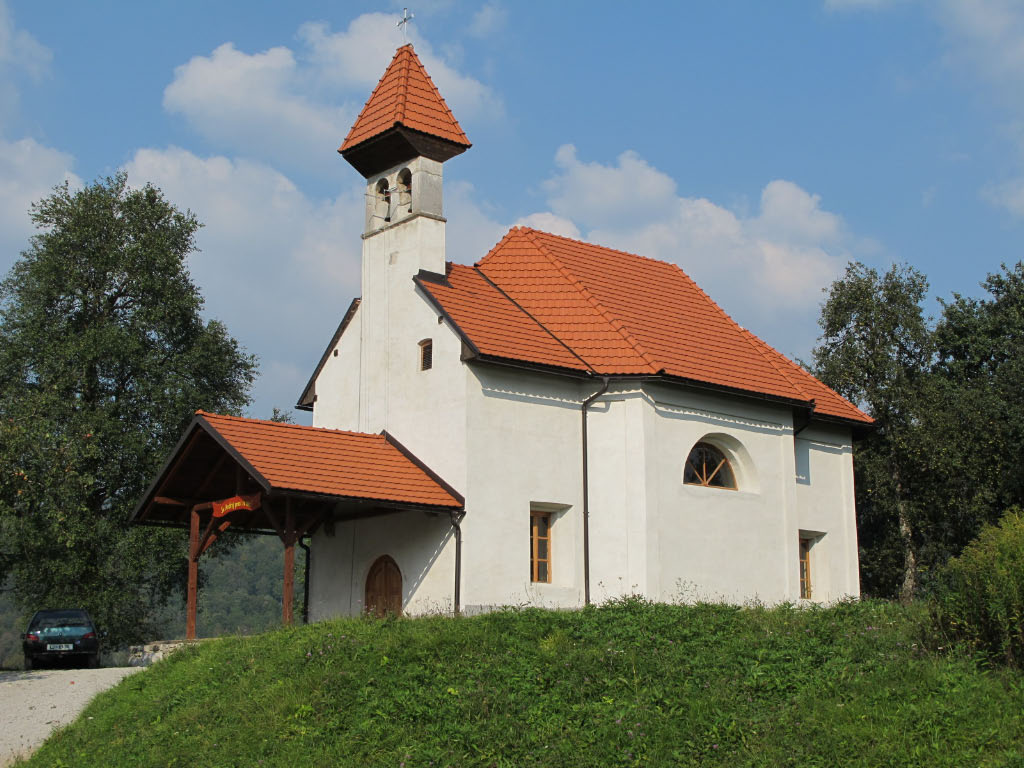
Saint Andrew's Church

A chapel of ease dedicated to Saint Andrew was built in the village in 1758 based on the plans for the parish church in Mozelj. A previous church stood at the site as early as the 17th century, indicated also by a missal from 1641. The now-abandoned church has a single nave and a bell-gable. Saint Andrew's Church is located on the edge of the village and is registered as cultural heritage. The original structure was mentioned by Johann Weikhard von Valvasor in 1689, who stated that it had three altars. After the Second World War, when Suhi Potok was nearly abandoned, the church was used as a barn, after which it started to deteriorate. The originally wooden shingled roof was replaced with a tiled roof in the fall of 2006 to prevent further deterioration of the building.
