= Festenbach =

River in Germany

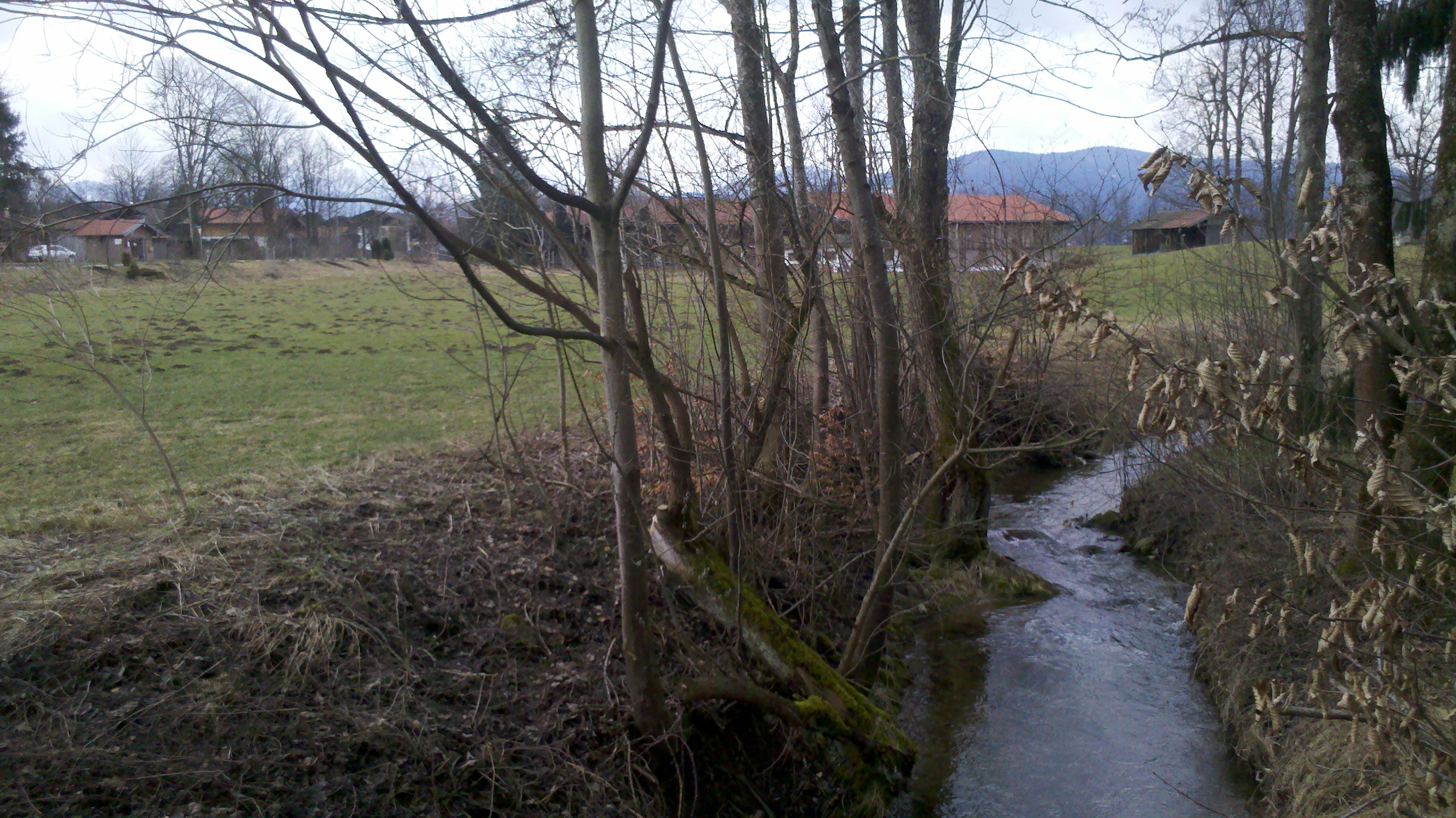

Location
- Country: Germany
- State: Bavaria

Physical characteristics
- Mouth
  - location: Mangfall
  - coordinates: 47.7764°N 11.7726°E
- Length: 13.1 km (8.1 mi)

Basin features
- Progression: Mangfall→ Inn→ Danube→ Black Sea

Festenbach is a river of Bavaria, Germany. It flows into the Mangfall near Thalmühl, a part of Warngau.

== See also ==
- List of rivers of Bavaria
