= Glonn (Mangfall) =

River in Germany

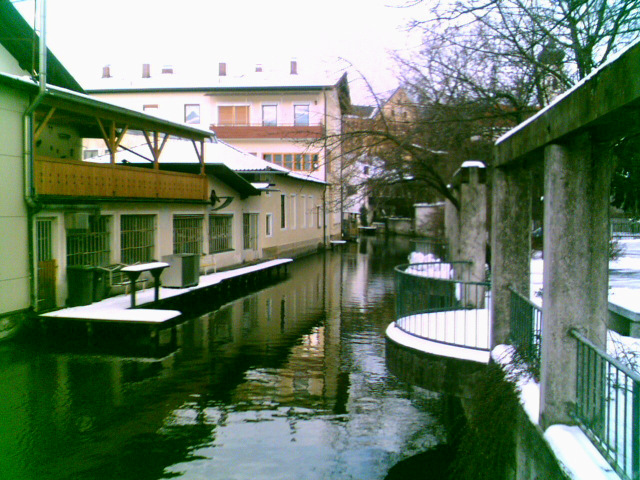
- The Glonn in Bad Aibling

Location
- Country: Germany
- State: Bavaria

Physical characteristics
- Mouth
  - location: Mangfall
  - coordinates: 47.8536°N 12.0170°E
- Length: 28.7 km (17.8 mi)
- Basin size: 145 km^{2} (56 sq mi)

Basin features
- Progression: Mangfall→ Inn→ Danube→ Black Sea

Glonn (German pronunciation: [ɡlɔn]) is a river in Bavaria, Germany.

Its source is in Glonn in the Ebersberg district and it flows in the south-east direction via Beyharting (Tuntenhausen) to Bad Aibling, where it flows into the Mangfall.

The Glonn has a length of about 29 km (18 mi). Its name originates from "Glana", "the clear one" (female) in Celtic languages.

== See also ==
- List of rivers in Bavaria
