= Bruckmühl =

- Municipality
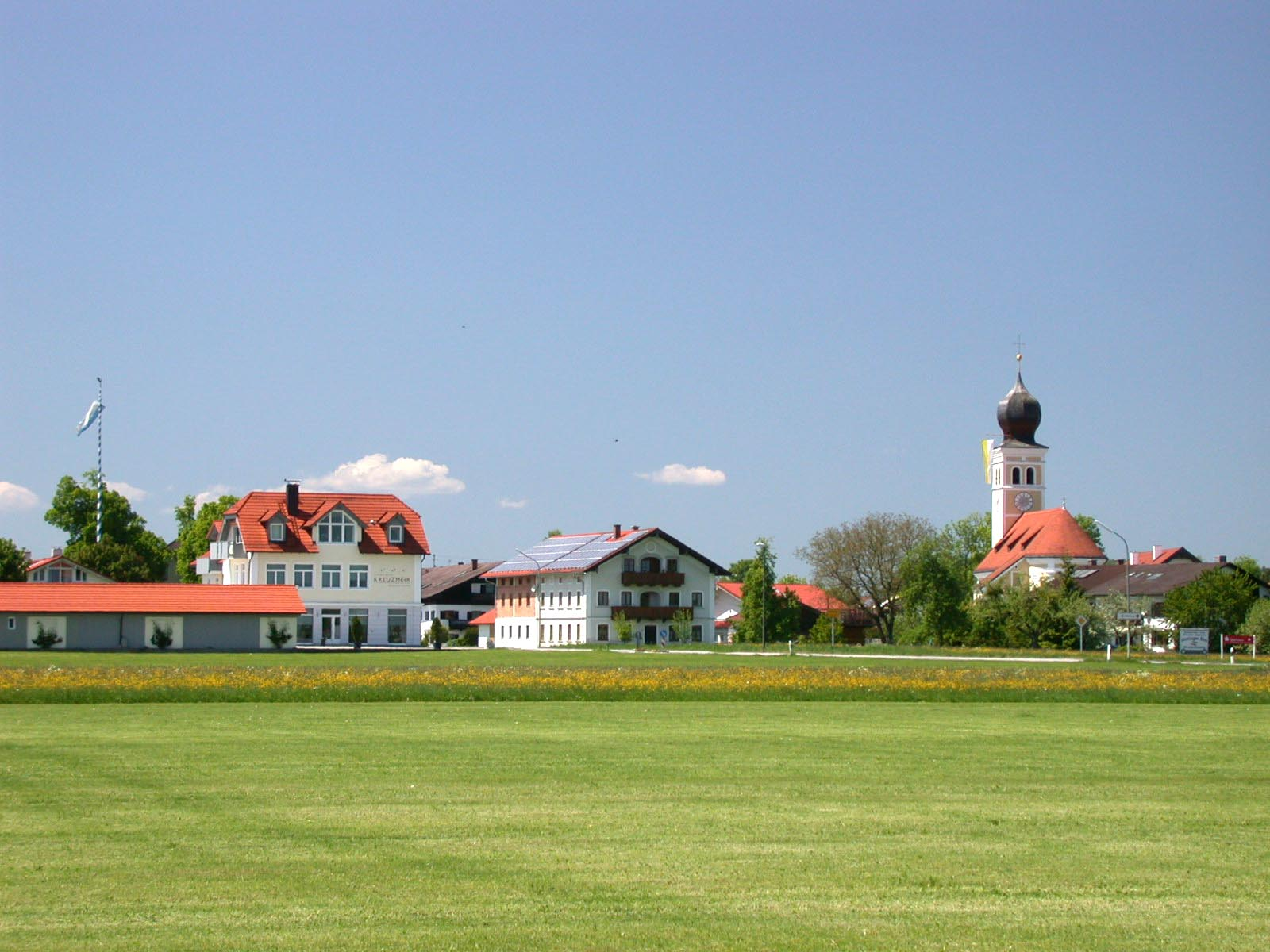
- Bruckmühl (Götting)

- Coat of arms

- Location of Bruckmühl within Rosenheim district
- Interactive map of Bruckmühl
- Location within Germany Location within Bavaria
- Coordinates: 47°53′N 11°55′E
- Country: Germany
- State: Bavaria
- Admin. region: Oberbayern
- District: Rosenheim

Government
  - Mayor (2020–26): Richard Richter (CSU)

Area
  - Total: 50.21 km^{2} (19.39 sq mi)
- Elevation: 511 m (1,677 ft)

Population (2025-12-31)
  - Total: 16,992
  - Density: 338.4/km^{2} (876.5/sq mi)
- Time zone: UTC+01:00 (CET)
  - Summer (DST): UTC+02:00 (CEST)
- Postal codes: 83052
- Dialling codes: 08062 and 08061
- Vehicle registration: RO
- Website: www.bruckmuehl.de

Bruckmühl (German pronunciation: [ˈbʁʊkmyːl]; Central Bavarian: ‘’Bruckmui’’) is a market town in the district of Rosenheim, in Bavaria, Germany. It is situated on the River Mangfall, 16 km west of Rosenheim.

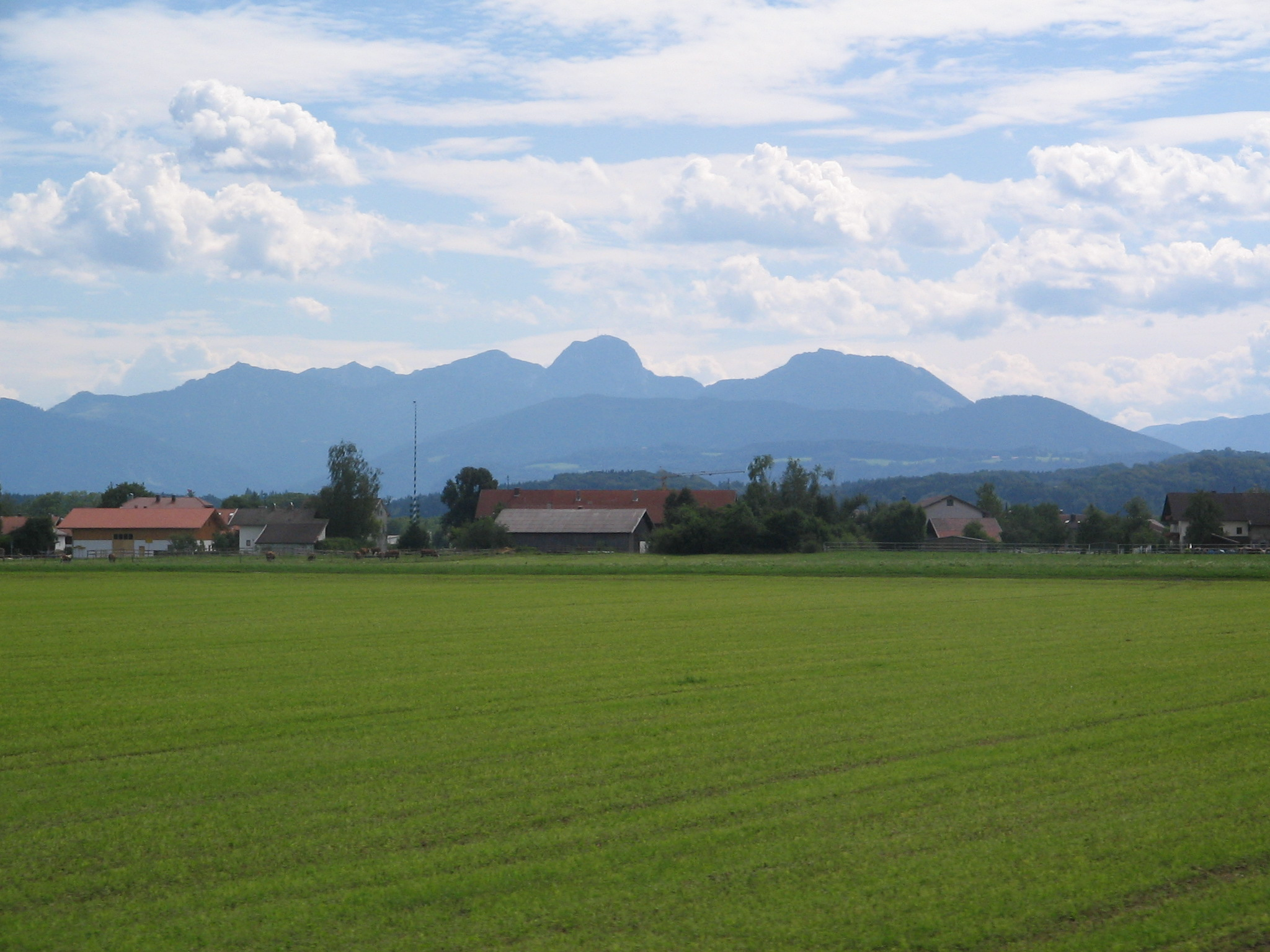
View

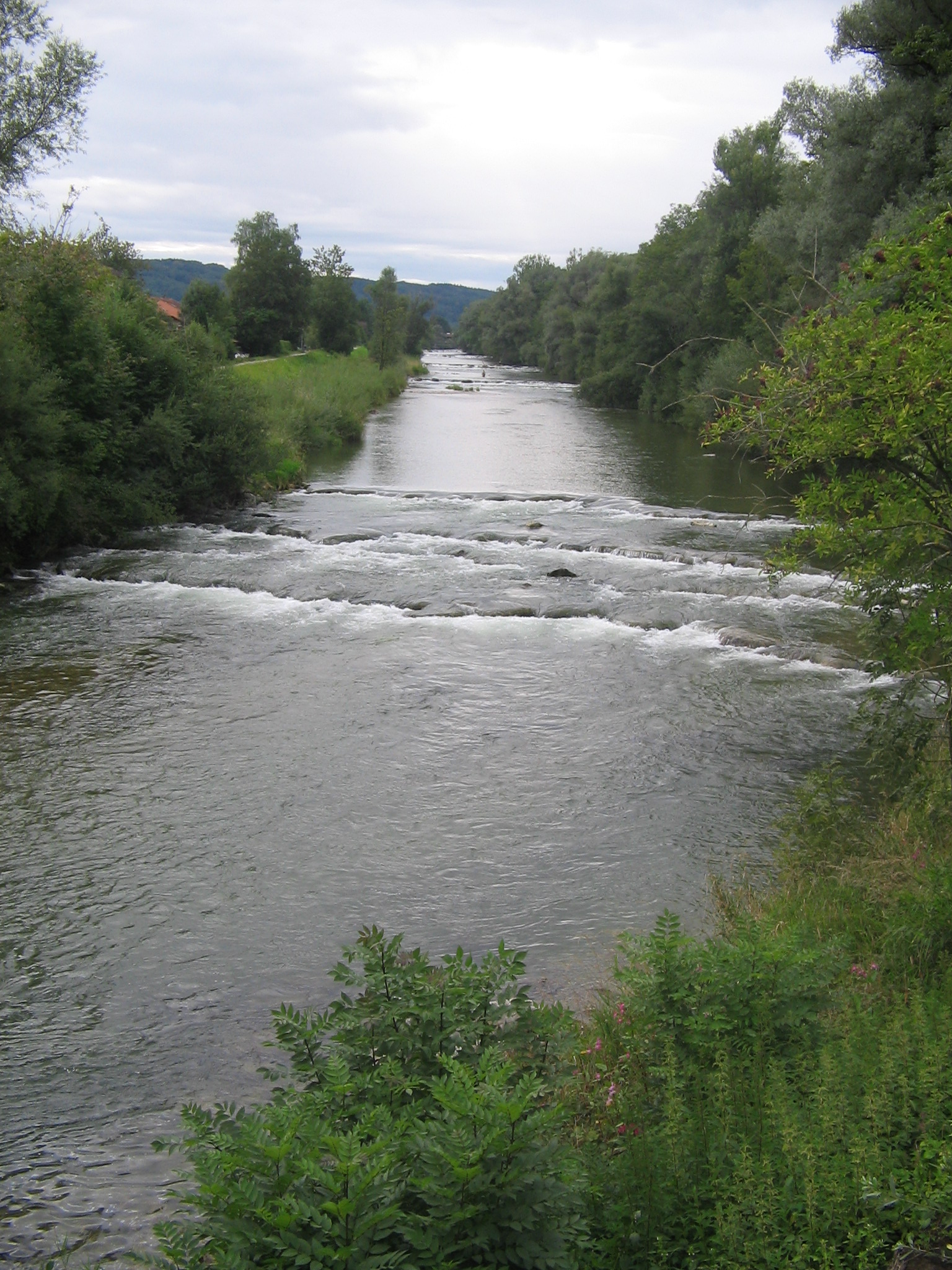
Mangfall near Bruckmühl
