= Tuntenhausen =

- Municipality
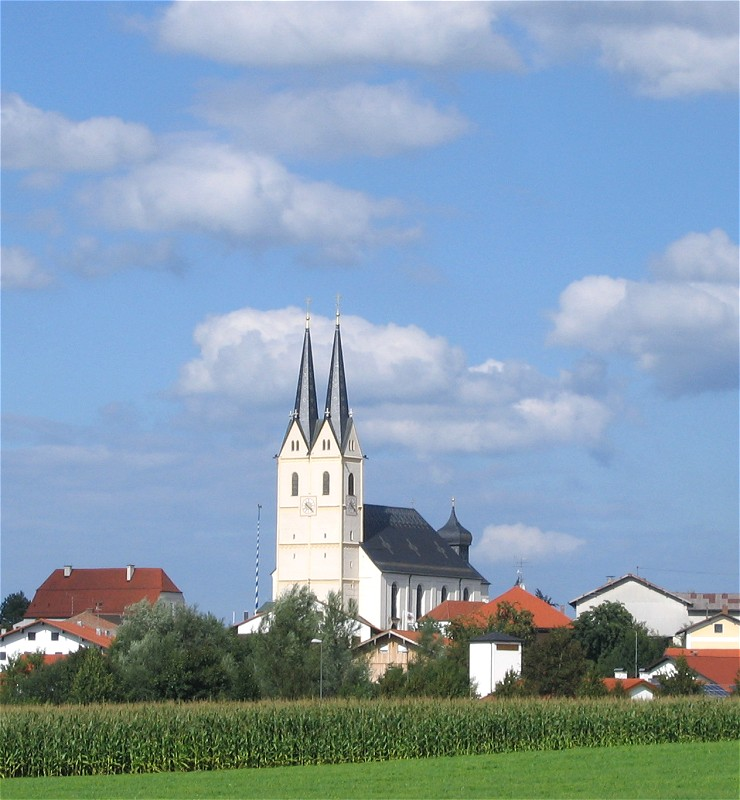
- Church of the Assumption of the Virgin Mary

- Coat of arms

- Location of Tuntenhausen within Rosenheim district
- Interactive map of Tuntenhausen
- Location within Germany Location within Bavaria
- Coordinates: 47°56′N 12°01′E
- Country: Germany
- State: Bavaria
- Admin. region: Oberbayern
- District: Rosenheim

Government
  - Mayor (2020–26): Georg Weigl (CSU)

Area
  - Total: 68.99 km^{2} (26.64 sq mi)
- Elevation: 508 m (1,667 ft)

Population (2025-12-31)
  - Total: 7,109
  - Density: 103.0/km^{2} (266.9/sq mi)
- Time zone: UTC+01:00 (CET)
  - Summer (DST): UTC+02:00 (CEST)
- Postal codes: 83104
- Dialling codes: 08067, 08065 (Schönau)
- Vehicle registration: RO
- Website: www.tuntenhausen.de

Tuntenhausen (German pronunciation: [tʊntn̩ˈhaʊzn̩]) is a municipality in the district of Rosenheim in Bavaria in Germany.

There are 57 official districts of Tuntenhausen, namely Tuntenhausen itself, Antersberg, Aubenhausen, Bach, Berg, Beyharting, Biberg, Bichl (this Bichl is an Einöde), Bichl (this Bichl is a Weiler (hamlet)), Bolkam, Brettschleipfen, Dettendorf, Eggarten, Eisenbartling, Emling, Fischbach, Fuchsholz, Großrain, Guperding, Haus, Höglhaus, Hohenthann, Holzbichl, Hopfen, Hörmating, Innerthann, Jakobsberg, Karlsried, Knogl, Kronbichl, Lampferding, Mailling, Maxlrain, Moosmühle, Mühlholz, Neureith, Nordhof, Oberrain, Oed, Ostermünchen, Pangraz, Schlafthal, Schmidhausen, Schönau, Schwaig, Schweizerberg, Schweizerting, Seisrain, Sindlhausen, Söhl, Stetten (this Stetten is a Dorf (village)), Stetten (this Stetten is an Einöde), Thal, Unterrain, Voglried, Weiching, Weng.

Ostermünchen is a station of the Munich–Rosenheim railway and served about once per hour by local trains.

The town is known best for its church, a destination for Roman Catholic pilgrims in Bavaria.

The name of the town translates roughly to "Sissy Town" what makes it a notable name for a German town.
