= Feldkirchen-Westerham =

- Municipality
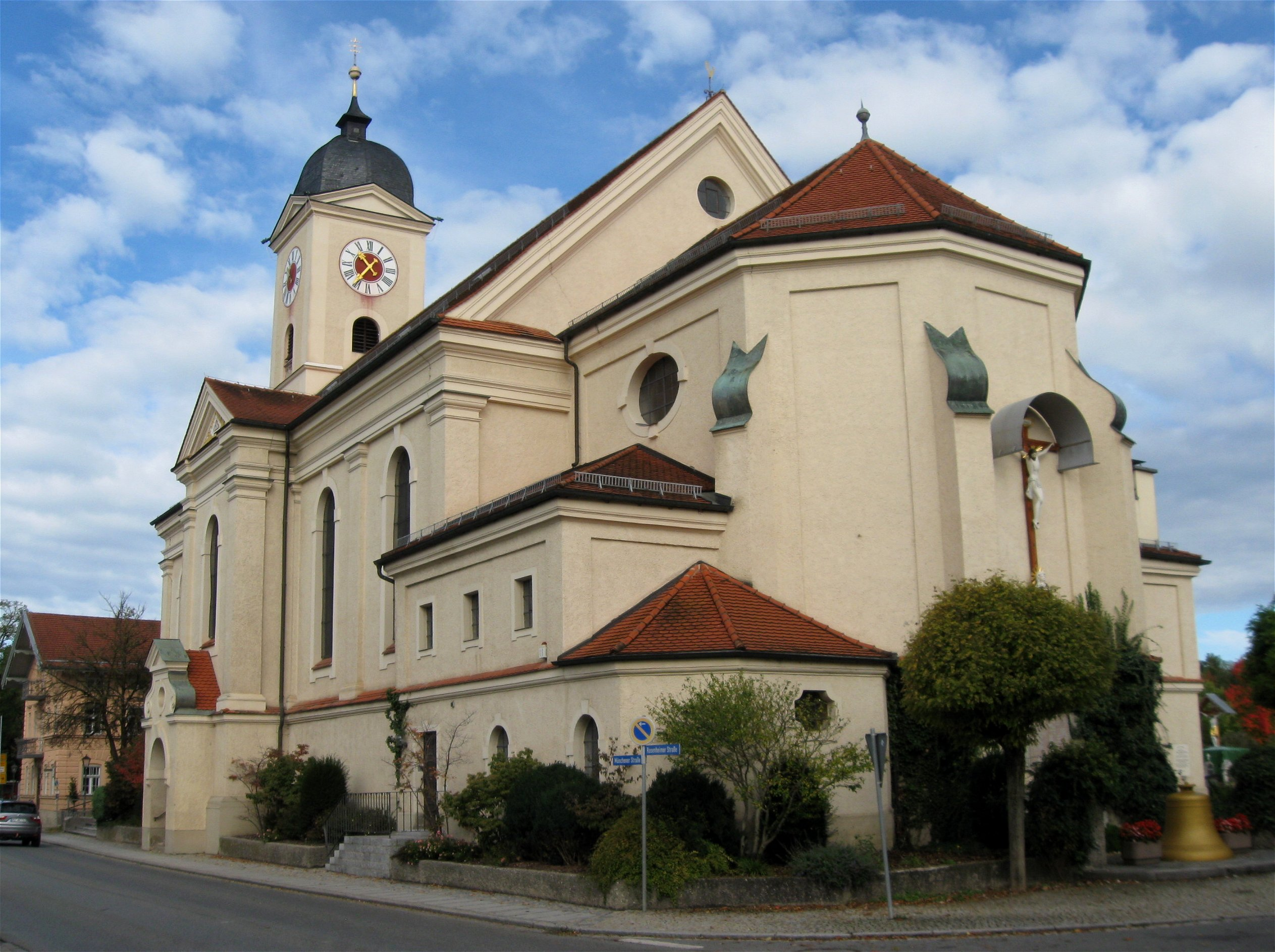
- Church of Saint Lawrence

- Coat of arms

- Location of Feldkirchen-Westerham within Rosenheim district
- Interactive map of Feldkirchen-Westerham
- Location within Germany Location within Bavaria
- Coordinates: 47°54′N 11°51′E
- Country: Germany
- State: Bavaria
- Admin. region: Oberbayern
- District: Rosenheim

Government
  - Mayor (2023–29): Johannes Zistl

Area
  - Total: 52.24 km^{2} (20.17 sq mi)
- Elevation: 551 m (1,808 ft)

Population (2025-12-31)
  - Total: 10,716
  - Density: 205.1/km^{2} (531.3/sq mi)
- Time zone: UTC+01:00 (CET)
  - Summer (DST): UTC+02:00 (CEST)
- Postal codes: 83620
- Dialling codes: 08063, 08062 (Vagen)
- Vehicle registration: RO
- Website: feldkirchen-westerham.de

Feldkirchen-Westerham is a municipality in the district of Rosenheim, in Bavaria, Germany. It is situated 22 km west of Rosenheim.

== Administrative divisions ==
Administratively, the municipality of Feldkirchen-Westerham has 54 named populated places within its jurisdiction:

- Altenburg
- Am Saum
- Aschbach
- Aschhofen
- Ast
- Buchberg
- Elendskirchen
- Eutenhausen
- Feldkirchen
- Feldolling
- Gmeinwies
- Großhöhenrain
- Haag
- Hammer
- Hofberg
- Hohenfried
- Holzklas
- Hub
- Irnberg
- Kleinhöhenrain
- Krügling
- Kugelloh
- Leiten
- Lenzmühle
- Loherberg
- Mühlberg
- Mühlholz
- Neuhaus
- Niederstetten
- Oberaufham
- Oberlaus
- Oberreit
- Oberstetten
- Oberwertach
- Oed
- Percha
- Pups
- Reisachöd
- Ried
- Riedbichl
- Schnaitt
- Schöffleiten
- Schwaig
- Stadlberg
- Staudach
- Sterneck
- Thal
- Unteraufham
- Unterlaus
- Unterreit
- Unterwertach
- Vagen
- Walpersdorf
- Weidach
- Westerham

== People ==
- Ilse Aigner (born 1964), German politician
