= Mangfall =

River in Germany

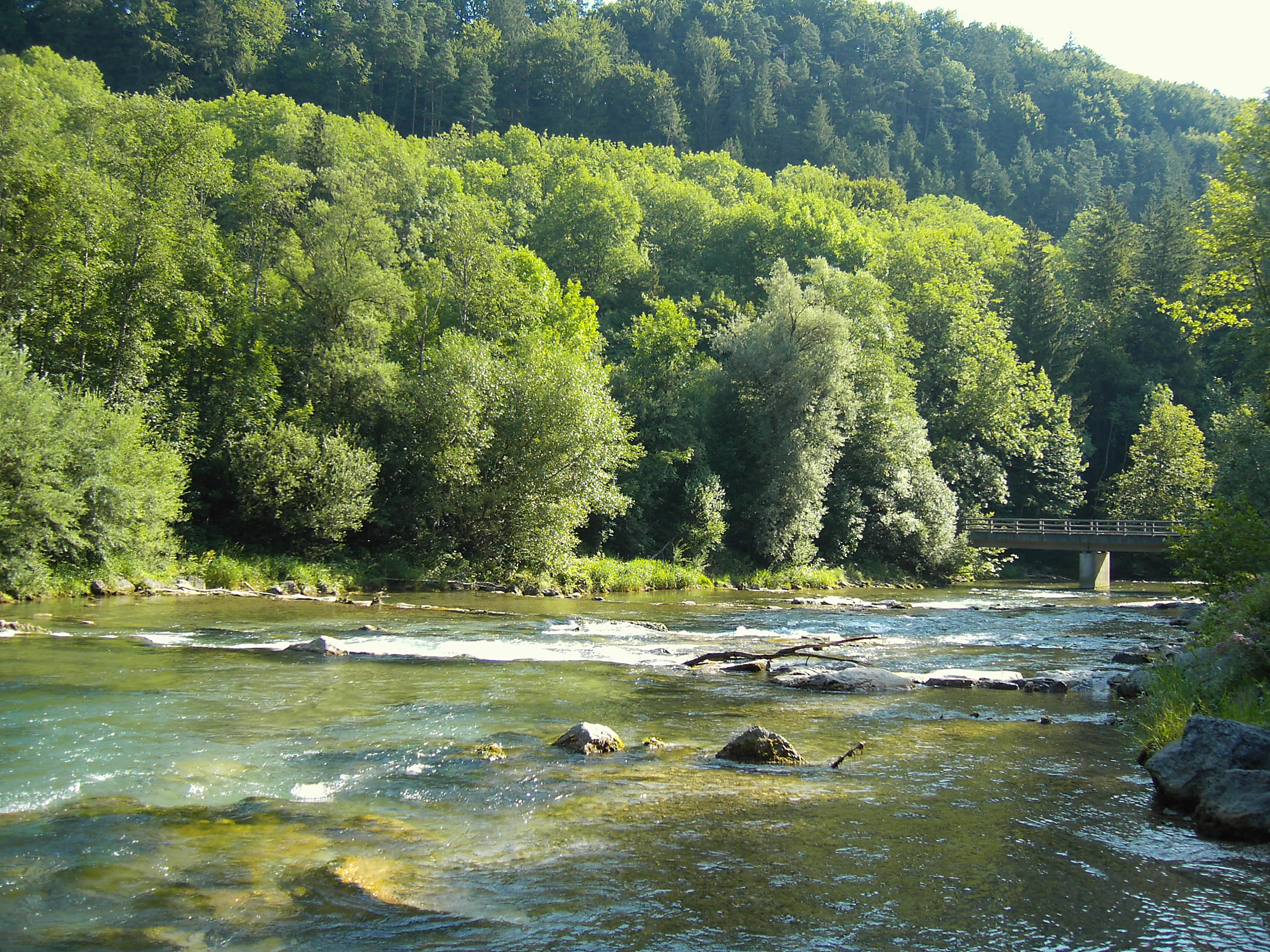
- Mangfall bend, looking downstream

Location
- Country: Germany
- State: Bavaria
- Reference no.: DE: 182

Physical characteristics
- Source
  - location: Sources: tailstream of the Tegernsee
  - coordinates: 47°44′52″N 11°44′07″E
  - elevation: 726 m above sea level (NN)
- Mouth
  - location: in Rosenheim into the Inn
  - coordinates: 47°51′35″N 12°08′10″E
  - elevation: 444 m above sea level (NN)
- Length: 62.9 km (39.1 mi)
- Basin size: 1,098 km^{2} (424 sq mi)

Basin features
- Progression: Inn→ Danube→ Black Sea
- Landmarks: Large towns: Rosenheim; Small towns: Bad Aibling, Kolbermoor
- Tributaries
  - left: Festenbach (also called Moosbach), Steinbach, Glonn
  - right: Schwärzenbach, Schlierach, Moosbach, Leitzach, Hainerbach, Goldbach (auch Mühlbach), Kaltenbrunnbach, Kalten
- Waterbodies: Lakes: Tegernsee

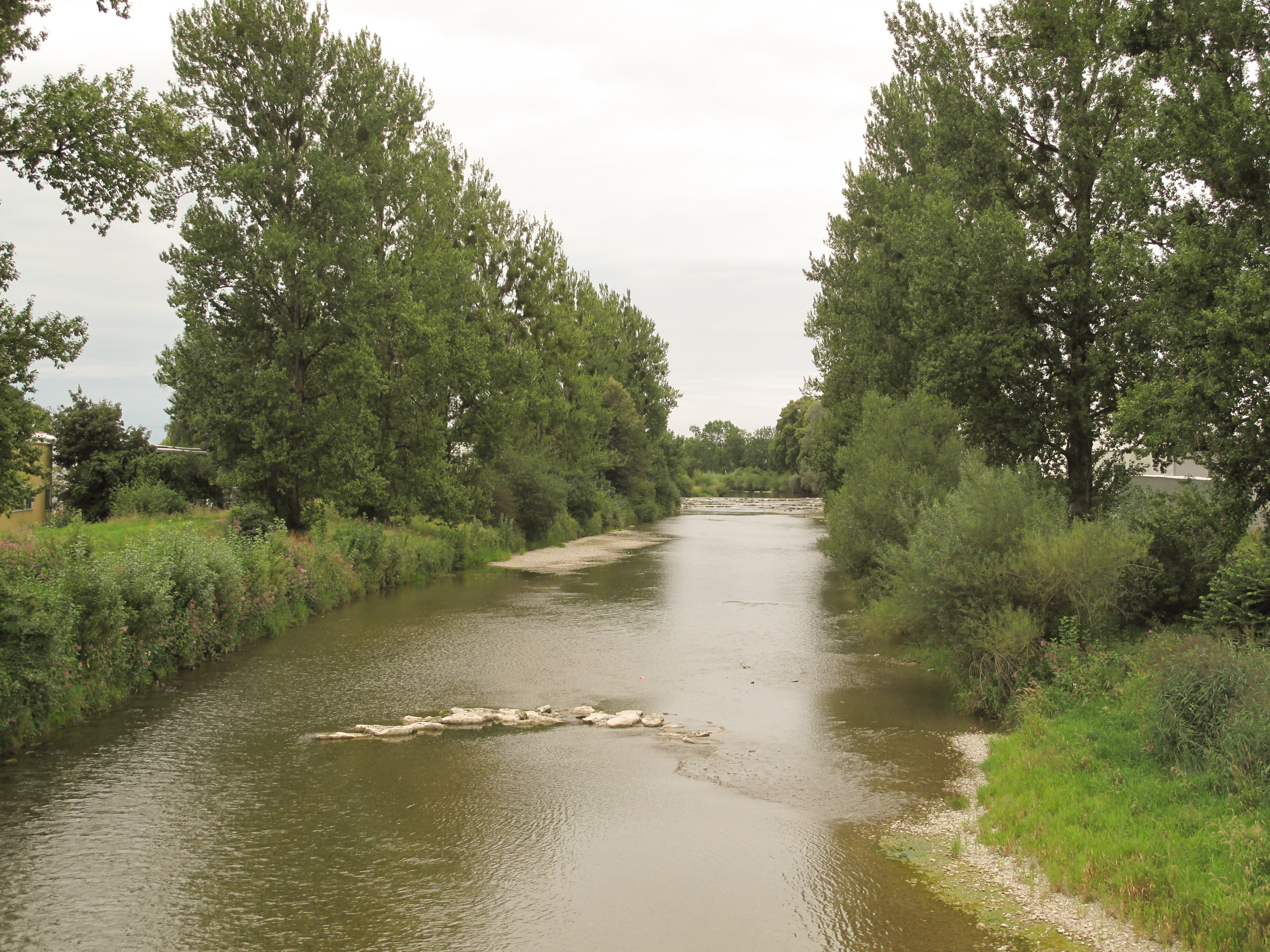
The Mangfall in Rosenheim

The Mangfall (German pronunciation: [ˈmaŋfal]) is a river of Upper Bavaria, Germany. It is a left tributary of the Inn. The Mangfall is the outflow of the Tegernsee lake and discharges into the Inn in Rosenheim. The Mangfall is 63 km (39 mi) long.

The Mangfall is not navigable. However, it was once used to transport trees (drifting), which were either processed into paper or used as fuel.

== Towns and villages on the Mangfall ==
- Gmund am Tegernsee
- Valley
- Weyarn
- Grub (district of Valley)
- Feldkirchen-Westerham
- Feldolling
- Bruckmühl
- Götting (district of Bruckmühl)
- Heufeld (district of Bruckmühl)
- Bad Aibling
- Kolbermoor
- Rosenheim

== See also ==
- List of rivers of Germany
  - List of rivers of Bavaria
