= Tegernsee =

Stadt Tegernsee
- Town
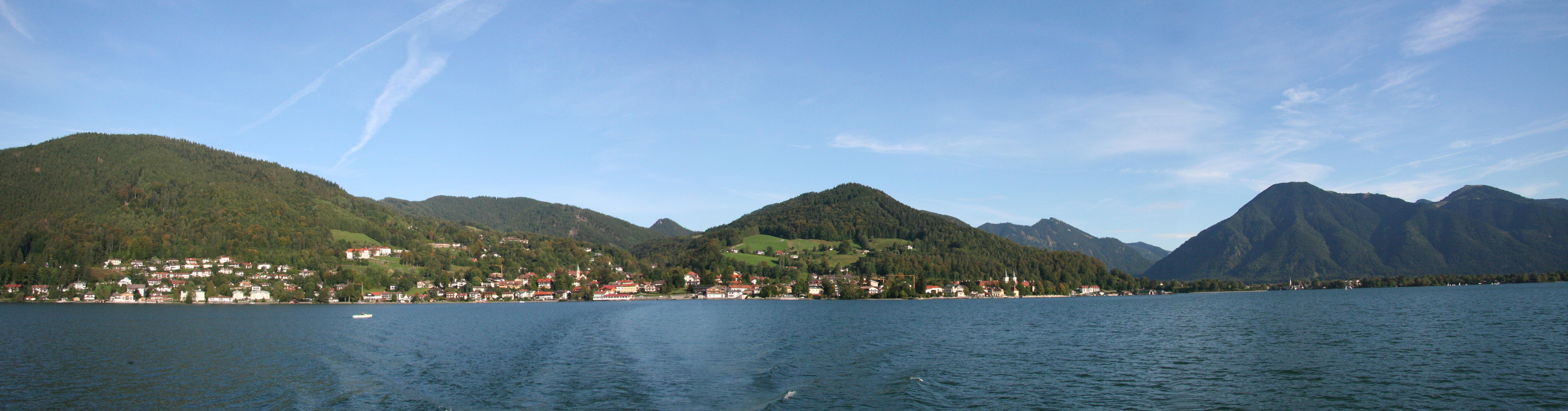
- Panorama of the town from across the lake

- Coat of arms

- Location of Stadt Tegernsee within Miesbach district
- Interactive map of Stadt Tegernsee
- Location within Germany Location within Bavaria
- Coordinates: 47°42′N 11°46′E
- Country: Germany
- State: Bavaria
- Admin. region: Oberbayern
- District: Miesbach

Government
  - Mayor (2020–26): Johannes Hagn (CSU)

Area
  - Total: 22.77 km^{2} (8.79 sq mi)
- Elevation: 747 m (2,451 ft)

Population (2025-12-31)
  - Total: 3,538
  - Density: 155.4/km^{2} (402.4/sq mi)
- Time zone: UTC+01:00 (CET)
  - Summer (DST): UTC+02:00 (CEST)
- Postal codes: 83684
- Dialling codes: 08022
- Vehicle registration: MB
- Website: rathaus-tegernsee.de

Tegernsee (German pronunciation: [ˈteːɡɐnˌzeː]) is a town in the Miesbach district of Bavaria, Germany. It is located on the banks of Lake Tegernsee, which is 747 m (2,451 ft) above sea level. A spa town, it is surrounded by an alpine landscape of Upper Bavaria, and has an economy mainly based on tourism.

The town is home to a former Benedictine monastery, the Tegernsee Abbey. Today the building is a Schloss. The northern wing of the abbey contains a brewery that produces the famous Tegernsee Lager Beer.

== History ==
The original settlers of the area around the lake are not known. The recorded history of the region and of the town began with the arrival of the Bavarians in the sixth century AD. The noble family of the Agilolfings ruled this region and the entire Duchy of Bavaria.

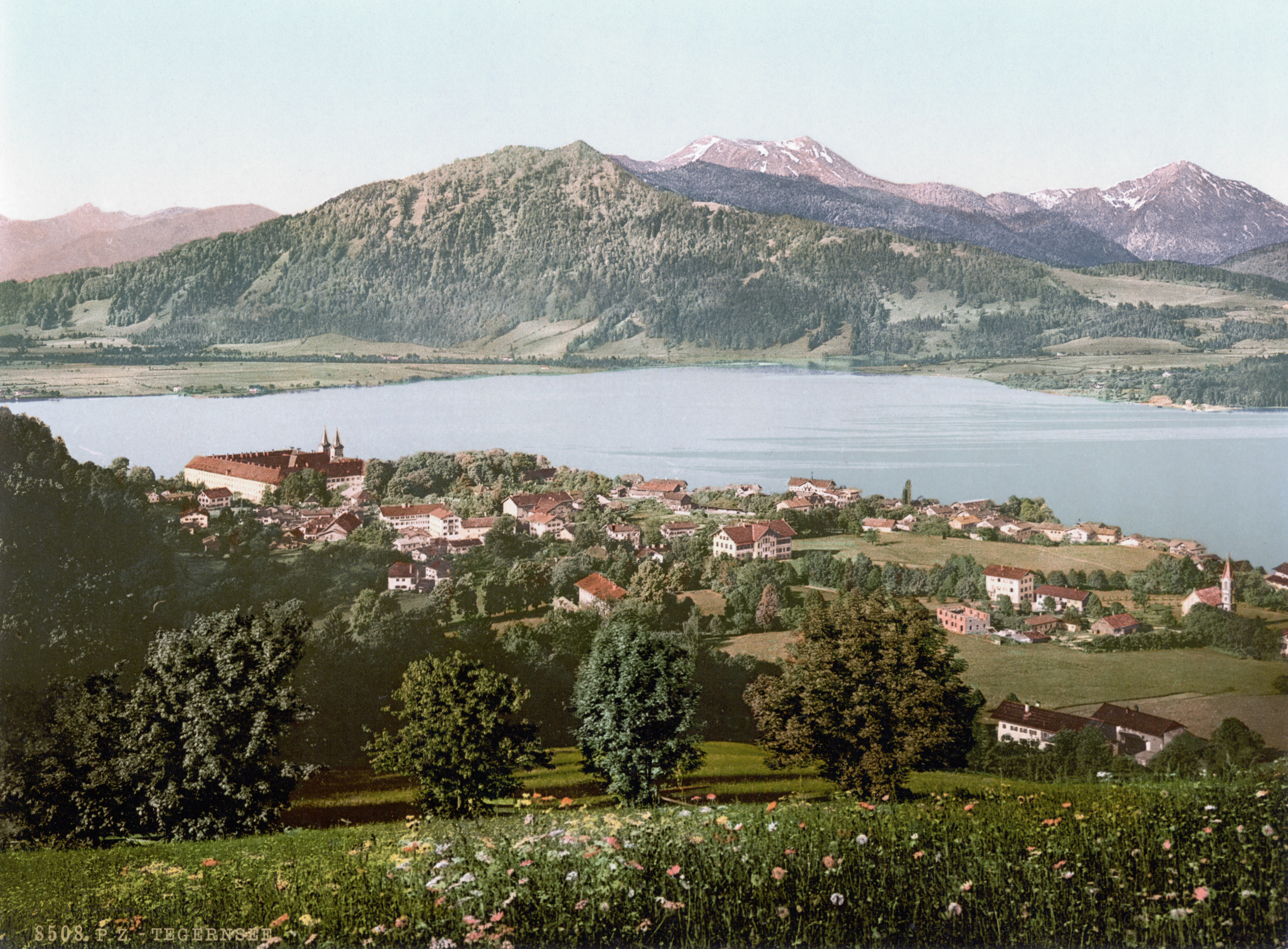
Tegernsee – Photocrom postcard from 1900

In 746, the brothers Adalbert and Ottokar, of the noble family of Huosi, founded a Benedictine monastery, Tegernsee Abbey. Its name derives from Old High German tegarin seo, meaning "large lake". Although much of the town's early history was lost as a result of Magyar incursions in the tenth century, it is known that relics of St. Quirinus, which the founders of the abbey obtained from Pope Paul I, were transferred in the eighth century from Rome to Tegernsee in order to be placed in its first church. The monastery had a substantial influence on the development of Southern Bavaria during the Middle Ages. It fell into decay in 907 after a series of defeats by the Magyars. It was secularized in 921 by Duke Arnulf and re-established in 979 by Emperor Otto II and Duke Otto I of Bavaria. The emperor appointed a new abbot and granted the rights of free election of the abbot, freedom from taxes, and imperial protection. Thus removed from the suzerainty of the Bavarian rulers, the abbey recovered its prosperity and grew culturally and artistically. Workshops were founded for book making, for glass painting, and for goldsmithing. Around 1030, Ruodlieb, an early German romance of knightly adventure written in Latin verse, likely was written there. In 1165, Holy Roman Emperor Friedrich I visited the abbey. In the fifteenth century Cardinal Nicholas of Cusa corresponded with the abbot and the prior about issues including mystical theology.

Because of its naturally protected position, Tegernsee suffered less from war and hardship than other parts of Bavaria. However, it was affected by the Black Death during the Thirty Years' War of 1618–1648. The monastery was secularized in 1803 and was acquired by the Bavarian royal family, the Wittelsbachs, who made it their summer residence. They brought court life and visitors to the lake, starting the tourism that characterizes the area today. The town experienced tribulations during the War of the Austrian Succession of 1740–1748 and suffered many casualties in wars from the Austro-Prussian War in 1866 until World War II.

The abbey buildings were used as a military hospital during World War II. The valley became overcrowded with evacuees, who were there for protection from the bombing of urban areas. In the final weeks of the war, an SS division moved into the valley and built defenses against the American forces advancing from Bad Tölz.

On May 3, 1945, as American artillery prepared to open fire on the town, a wounded officer in the German army, Maj. Hannibal von Lüttichau, who was recovering in the makeshift military hospital, persuaded the SS to withdraw in order to save the town and its large population of noncombatants from the imminent bombardment. After persuading the SS to withdraw from the town, the Major advanced unarmed, in uniform, and alone toward the American forces under a white flag and he convinced the commanding officer to spare the town.

== Geography ==
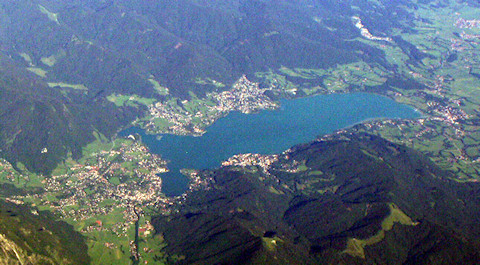
Aerial view of Lake Tegernsee and the village

Tegernsee is located in the Bavarian Alps, on the eastern shore of Lake Tegernsee, neighbouring Gmund am Tegernsee and Hausham are to the north, Schliersee is to the east, and Rottach-Egern to the south. The Bavarian state capital, Munich, is approximately 50 km (31 mi) north of the town, and the Austrian state of Tyrol is approximately 20 km (12 mi) south.

The Alpbach stream, the bed of which was cleaned up in 2010, runs through the center of Tegernsee. The Rottach river flows partly along the boundary between the communities of Tegernsee and Rottach-Egern. The Baumgartenschneid, a 1,448 metre high mountain, is located not far from the town.

At the 2010 census, Tegernsee had a population of 3,889, of whom 1,672 were male and 2,217 female.

== Attractions ==
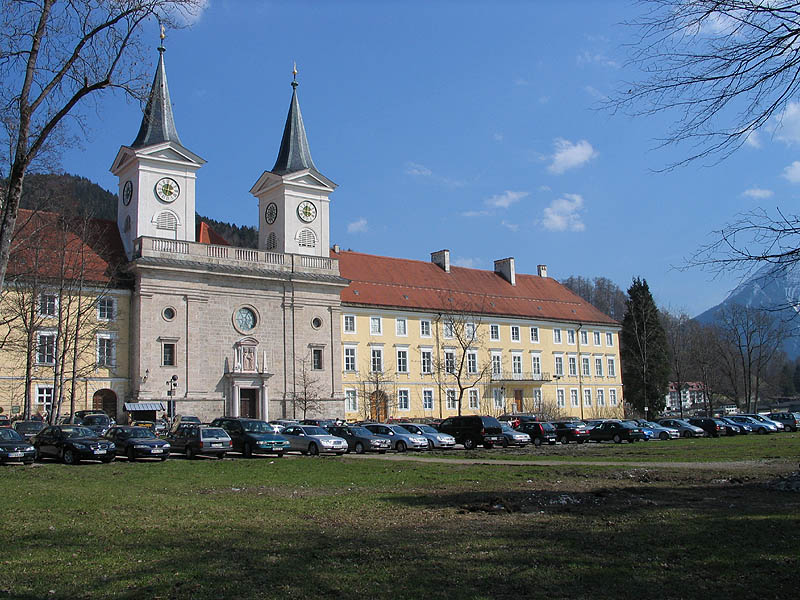
Schloss Tegernsee, the former Benedictine Abbey

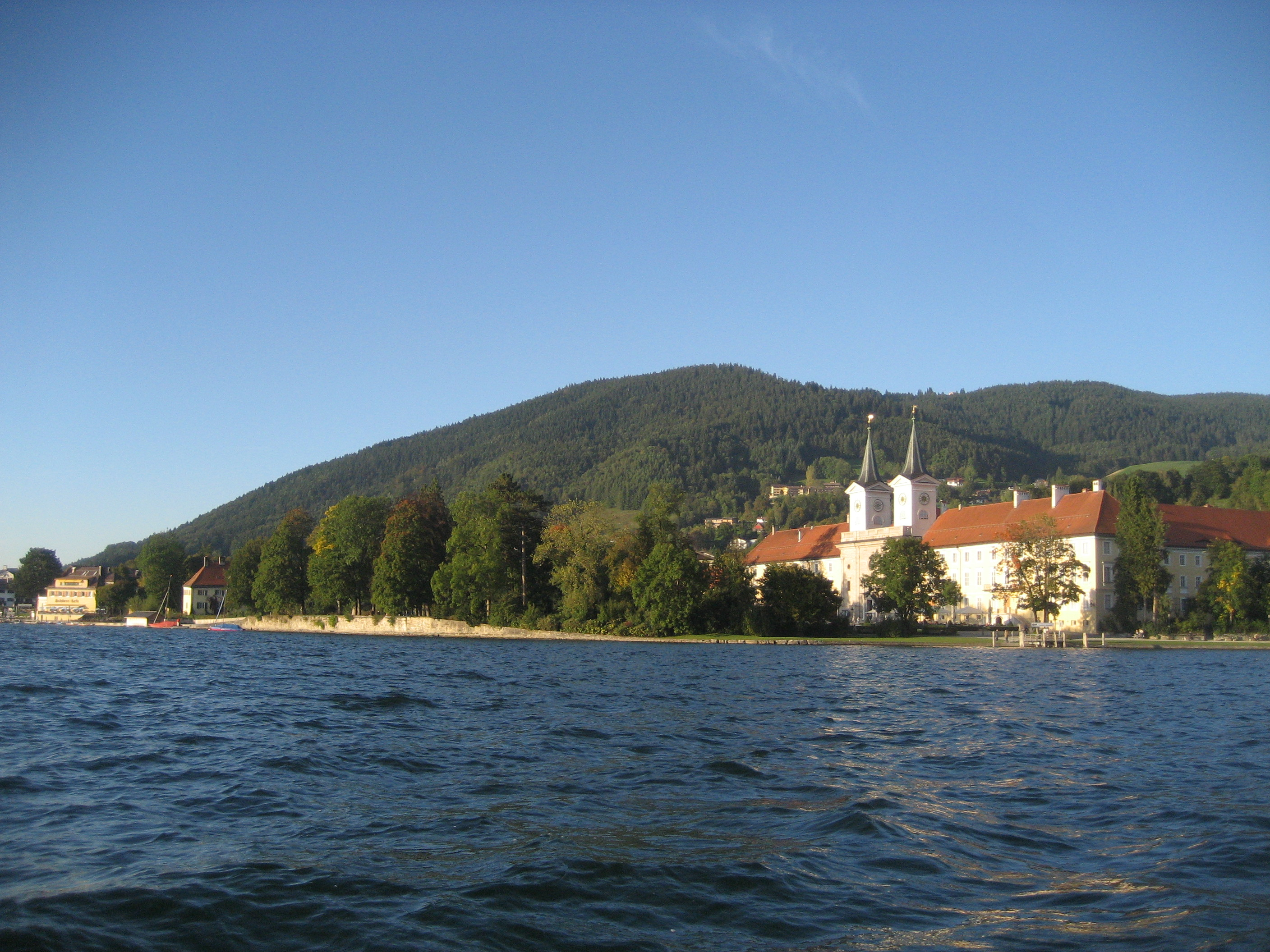
Schloss Tegernsee viewed from the lake

The former Benedictine Abbey of Tegernsee is open to visitors. The complex is composed of the parish church of Saint Quirinus, the former abbey church, and the adjacent north and south wings surrounding the two courtyards. The north wing hosts the Ducal Bavarian Brewery of Tegernsee, one of Germany's oldest breweries. The entire complex is called Schloss Tegernsee and it has been owned by the Wittelsbach family since 1817.

Other historic buildings in Tegernsee include the homes of the writer Ludwig Ganghofer and the painter Joseph Karl Stieler, and the summer residence of Lord Acton. The Olaf Gulbransson Museum has been open since 1966 and is dedicated to the art of the Norwegian painter and caricaturist Olaf Gulbransson. The Museum Tegernseer Tal was established in 1999 in the Old Rectory of Tegernsee. It has 17 exhibition rooms, and its theme is the history and culture of the Tegernsee valley from the Middle Ages to the present. The Tegernseer Volkstheater has been in use since 1898.

The area around the Tegernsee lake serves as a recreational area. It is surrounded by the Bavarian Alps and occupies approximately 9 km^{2} (3.5 sq mi). It offers aquatic sports such as swimming and fishing, and other activities including hiking and Nordic walking. One may climb the 700 metres to the top of the Baumgartenschneid: the ascent takes two hours and the descent one and a half hours.

== Economy ==
Tourism plays an important part in the economy of the city and the district. The local Orthopedic Clinic is the town's largest employer. Since 2003, the city has hosted the annual Tegernsee International Mountain Film Festival during October, in which movies depicting life in the mountains compete.

== Transport ==
Tegernsee is connected to Bundesstraße 307, which runs from Gmund am Tegernsee to the Sylvenstein Dam. The Bundesautobahn 8 passes approximately 20 km to the north. The 9559 Tegernsee-Ringlinie bus connects Tegernsee with Rottach-Egern, Bad Wiessee and Gmund am Tegernsee.

The railway station is the terminus of the privately owned Tegernsee-Bahn and is linked to Munich by through trains of the Bayerische Oberlandbahn. It is also a principal stop for the pleasure boat services operated on the lake by the Bayerische Seenschifffahrt company.

The nearest airports to Tegernsee are Munich Airport, located 88 km (55 mi) north and Innsbruck Airport, located 98 km (61 mi) south west of the town.

== Politics ==
=== Coat of arms ===
The coat of arms of Tegernsee is divided into four quarters: the upper left and lower right quarters each depict three golden crowns on a blue background; the other two quarters depict water-lily leaves with entwined stalks above blue waves on a silver background. It was granted in 1886 and is based on the coat of arms of Tegernsee Abbey that dates from 1565.

=== Twin towns ===
In 2006, Tegernsee twinned with Dürnstein, an Austrian town on the Danube.

Dürnstein, Austria

== Sports ==
Tegernsee is the home town of Viktoria Rebensburg, an alpine ski racer who won the gold medal in the women's giant slalom at the 2010 Winter Olympics. She also won the giant slalom title in the 2011 Alpine Skiing World Cup.

The town is home to the sports club Turnverein Tegernsee e. V. whose chess club played until the 2008–2009 season in the first division of the German Bundesliga.

== Daughters and sons of the town ==
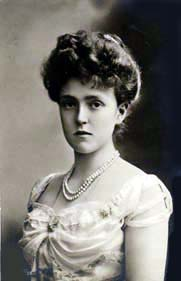
Duchess Marie Gabrielle von Bayern, around 1900

- Egid Quirin Asam (1692–1750), plasterer and sculptor of the late Baroque
- Mirko Bonné (born 1965), writer and translator
- Florian Busch (born 1985), ice hockey player
- Duchess Marie Gabrielle in Bavaria (1878–1912), daughter of Duke Karl Theodor in Bavaria and first wife of Crown Prince Rupprecht of Bavaria
- Joseph Kriechbaumer (1819–1902), zoologist (entomologist)
- Wolfgang Lackerschmid (born 1956), jazz musician
- Max Leo (1941–2012), luger
- Eva Mattes (born 1954), Austrian actress
- Marcus H. Rosenmüller (born 1973), film director
- Peter Schlickenrieder (born 1970), cross-country skier
- Marianne Seltsam (1932–2014), German ski racer
- Michael Veith (born 1957), ski racer

== Notable residents ==
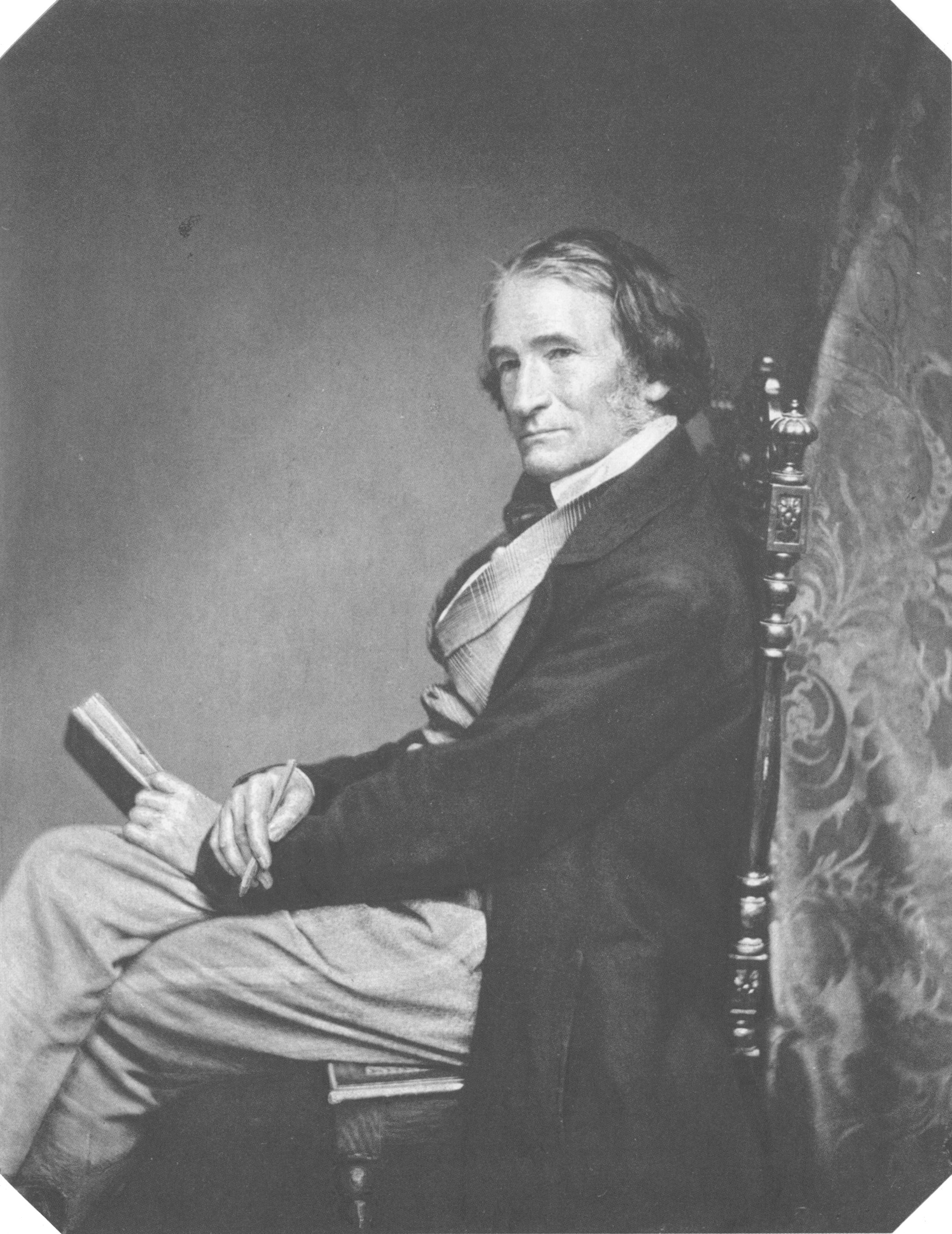
Josef Stieler, around 1857

- Hedwig Courths-Mahler (1867–1950), had lived in her house at Schwaighofstraße 47 since 1935, where she died
- British peer and historian John Dalberg-Acton, 1st Baron Acton, died at Tegernsee in 1902 at his wife's family home
- Ludwig Ganghofer, author
- Olaf Gulbransson (1873–1958), Norwegian painter and caricaturist
- August Macke (1887–1914), painter and member of the artist group Der Blaue Reiter, lived and painted a year in Tegernsee, from 1909 to 1910
- Oskar Messter (1866–1943), film pioneer, buried in the Tegernsee cemetery
- Joseph Karl Stieler (1781–1858), painter in the service of the Bavarian court
- Viktoria Rebensburg (born 1989), alpine ski racer, giant slalom gold medallist in the 2010 Winter Olympics
- Karl Stieler (1842–1885), jurist and poet; buried in the Tegernsee cemetery
- Ludwig Thoma (1867–1921), lived since 1908 in his house "Auf der Tuften" in Tegernsee, where he died
- Karl von Eberstein (1894–1979), German politician (NSDAP) and former Munich police officer lived since 1950 in Tegernsee and found his last retirement at the Tegernsee cemetery
- Philipp Bächstädt (born 1982), television producer and presenter
