= Catacomb of Pontian =

Ancient Roman artifact

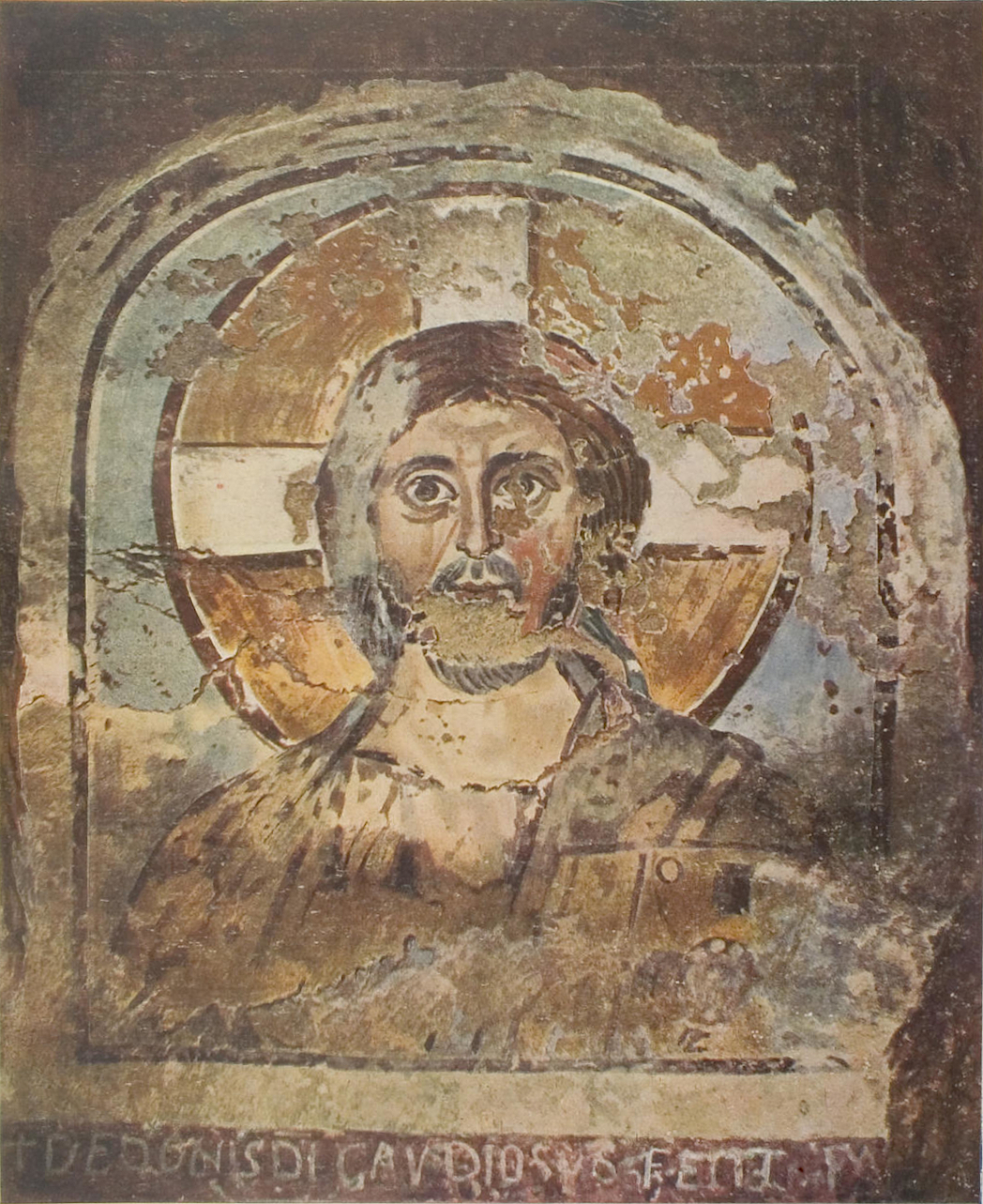
Frescoe of Christ, 6th-7th century A.D. from the Catacomb of Pontian.

The Catacomb(s) of Pontian is one of the catacombs of Rome on the Via Portuensis, notable for containing the original tombs of Pope Anastasius I (399–401) and his son Pope Innocent I (401–417). The Catacomb was discovered by famed Italian explorer Antonio Bosio in 1618.

Both Anastasius I and Innocent I were traditionally regarded as martyrs, but this is now regarded as dubious, due to the lack of a contemporaneous persecution. In the ninth century, Pope Sergius II moved the bodies of both popes to San Martino ai Monti in an effort to save them from destruction during the Lombard invasion. The catacomb does not contain the tomb of Pope Pontian, who was interred in the Catacomb of Callixtus, nor is it named after him; rather it is named after an unknown third-century Christian martyr.

Other notable remains in the Catacomb include: Saints Abdon and Sennen, martyrs Milix and Vincent, Saint Pollio, Saint Candida, Saint Pigmenius, and Saint Quirinus of Rome. The Catacomb contains a fifth/sixth-century fresco of Saints Marcellinus and Peter along with Saint Pollio, as well as an ancient baptistry containing a painting of the crowning of Abdon and Sennen.

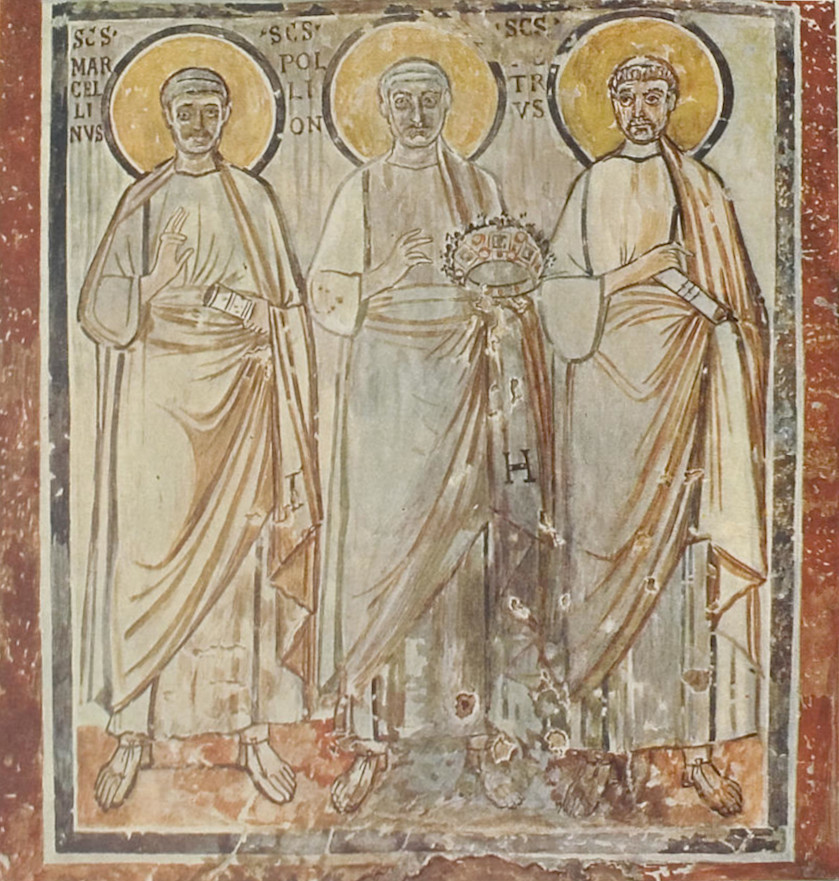
Saints Marcellinus, Pollion and Petrus in the Catacomb of Ponzian, from the book Die Malereien der Katakomben Roms (Tafeln), ed. by Joseph Wilpert, plate 255

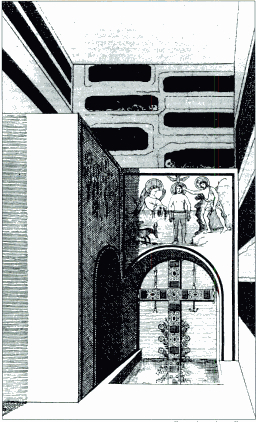
A drawing of the baptistry in the Catacomb of Pontian

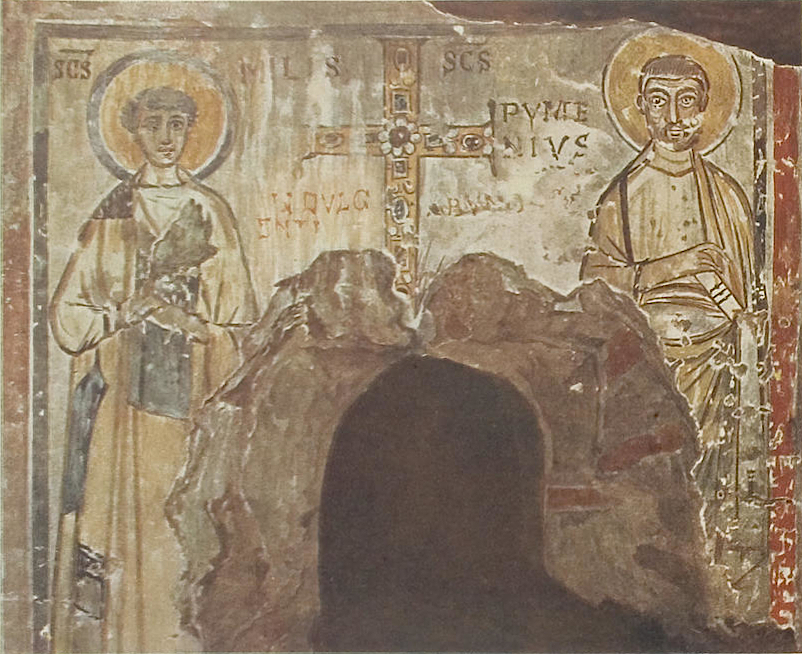
Frescoe in the Catacomb of Ponziano, Saints Milis and Pumenius, from the book Die Malereien der Katakomben Roms (Tafeln), ed. by Joseph Wilpert, plate 255
