= Baumgartenschneid =

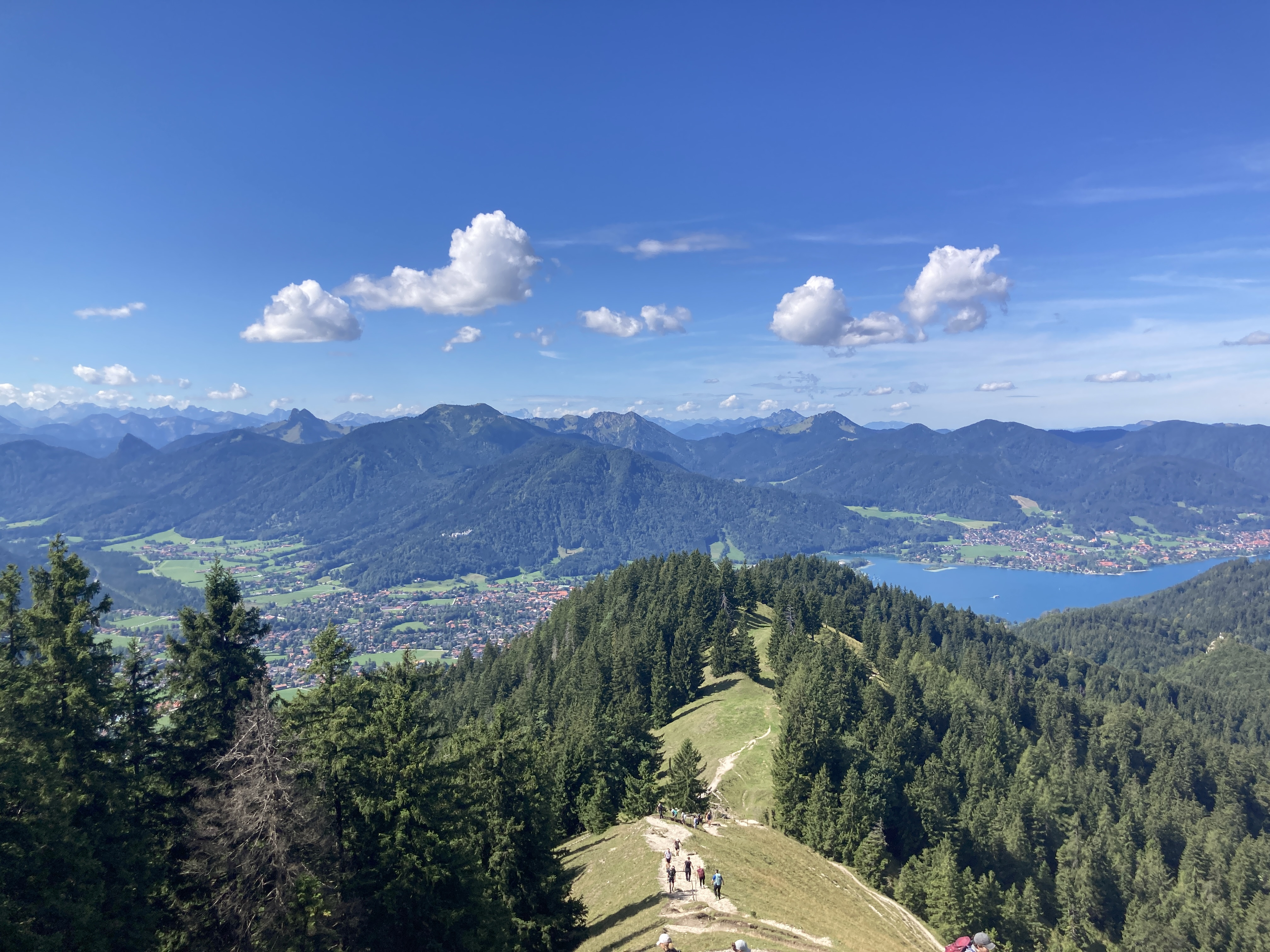
- View from top of Baumgartenschneid in direction of Tegernsee

Highest point
- Elevation: 1,448 m (4,751 ft)
- Coordinates: 47°42′12″N 11°48′53″E

Geography
- Location within Bavaria
- Location: Bavaria, Germany
- Parent range: Bavarian Prealps

The Baumgartenschneid is a 1,448 metre high mountain in the Bavarian Prealps above the Tegernsee to the east.

== Location and climbing routes ==
The climb to the summit is a straightforward mountain walk, taking 2 hours to ascend the 700 metres from Tegernsee and 1½ hours for the descent.

The peak may also be reached from Rottach-Egern or Schliersee on various paths. On the climbing path from Tegernsee or Rottach-Egern to the top, the path initially passes the inn, Gasthaus Galaun, at 1,060 m and then to the 1,207 m high rocks of the Riederstein, on which a small chapel stands.

The Baumgartenschneid is also a popular, easily accessible peak, even in winter. Provided the snow cover is not too deep, snow shoes are not required. Crampons are recommended, however, when it is icy.

The view from the summit cross on the Baumgartenschneid is dominated by the Tegernsee lake. Also visible are the surrounding Tegernsee Mountains like, for example, the Wallberg, the Setzberg, the Kampen and the Fockenstein. To the east the Wendelstein dominates the view.

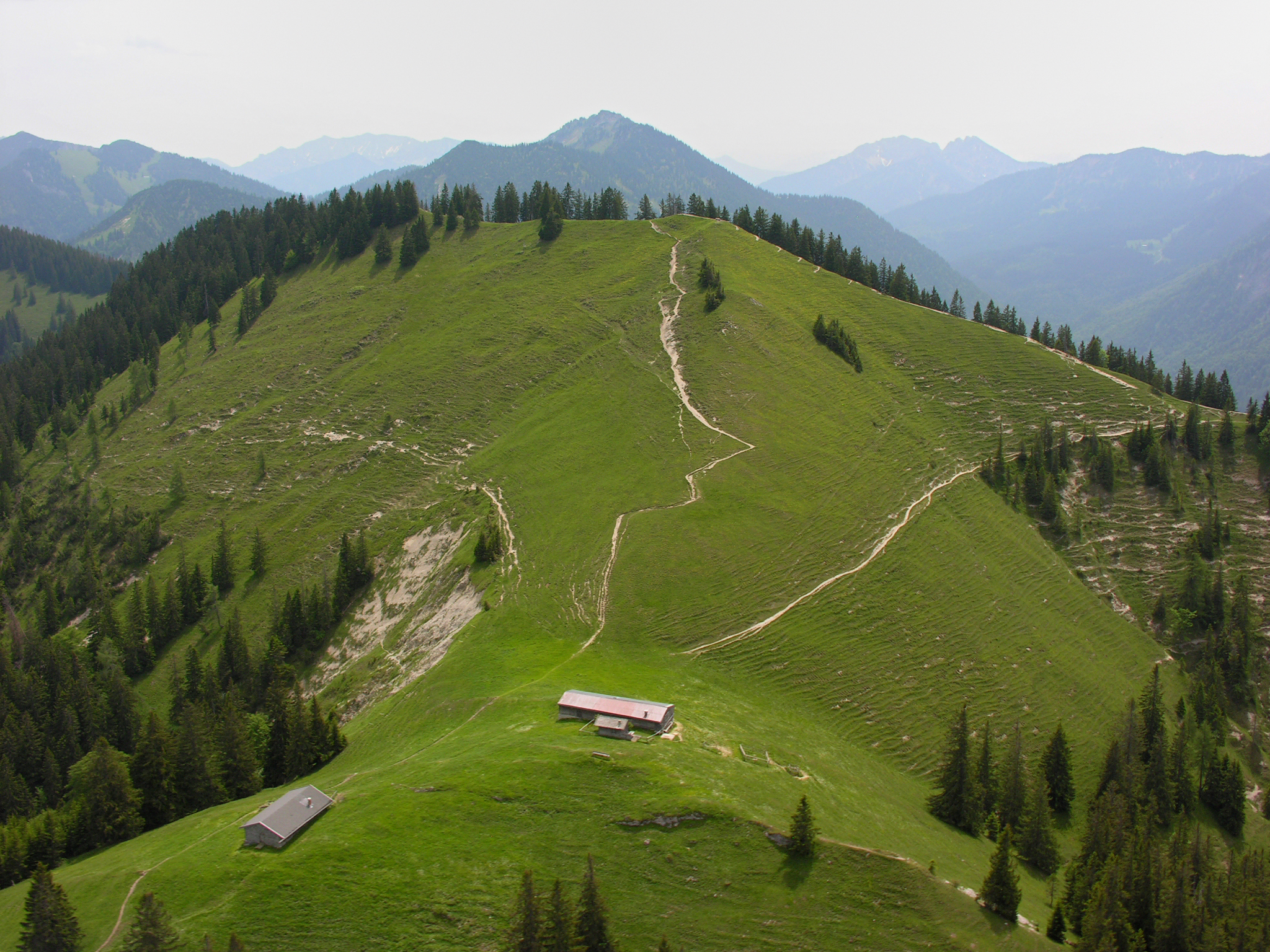
