= St. Laurentius, Holzkirchen =

Coordinates: 47.876°N 11.701°E

St Laurentius's, Holzkirchen
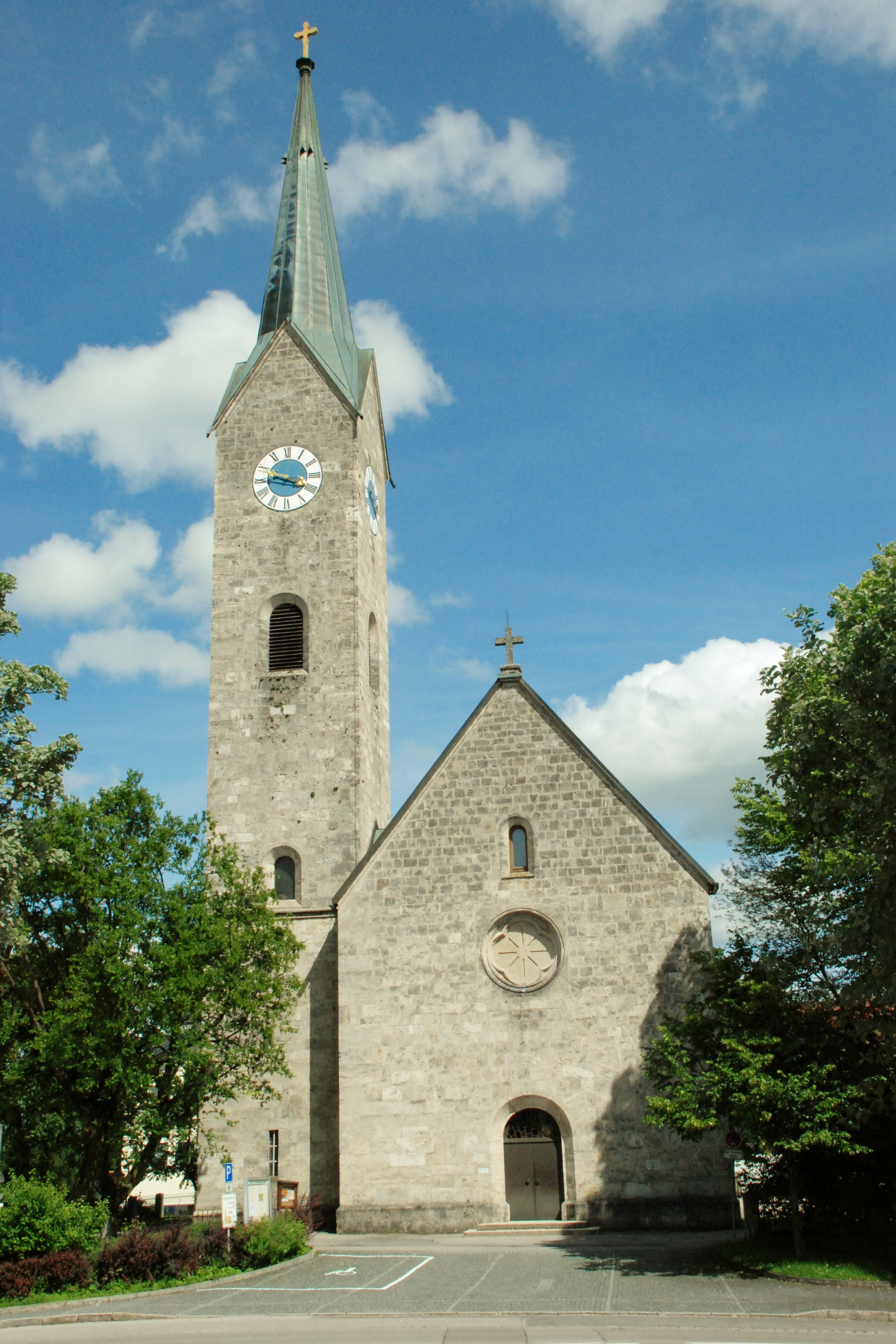
- St Laurentius's, Holzkirchen
- Denomination: Roman Catholic
- Website: https://pv-holzkirchen-warngau.de/index.php?id=52

History
- Status: Active
- Founded: c. 1000
- Dedication: Saint Lawrence

Architecture
- Style: Gothic
- Completed: 1838

Specifications
- Materials: stone

Administration
- Diocese: Munich and Freising
- Parish: Holzkirchen

The Church of St Laurentius is a Roman Catholic parish church in the town of Holzkirchen, Upper Bavaria, Germany. It belongs to the Archdiocese of Munich and Freising.

It is the oldest church in Holzkirchen. The date of its founding is unknown, though is thought to be around the year 1000. For much of its history, it was run by Tegernsee Abbey. The church (along with 15 houses) was destroyed in a fire in 1490. It was rebuilt in 1493, but further fires followed in 1532 (when the whole market was destroyed), 1562 and 1586. A complete rebuild occurred in 1704-1711 under the aegis of the abbot of Tegernsee, but further fires struck in 1728, 1777 and 1802. The church records on each occasion were destroyed. Tegernsee Abbey was finally secularised and closed in 1803. The church tower was removed owing to structural deterioration in 1830. It was replaced with the current one in 1838. The bells came back into use in 1840. Holzkirchen became a separate parish in 1855.

The church continued to be afflicted by fires in 1841, 1844 and 1861. In 1882–86, many of the baroque fittings were removed, though this meant that they were saved from further fires in 1885 and 1895. They were not restored to their intended locations until an extensive redecoration scheme for the church was completed in 1967.

== Gallery ==
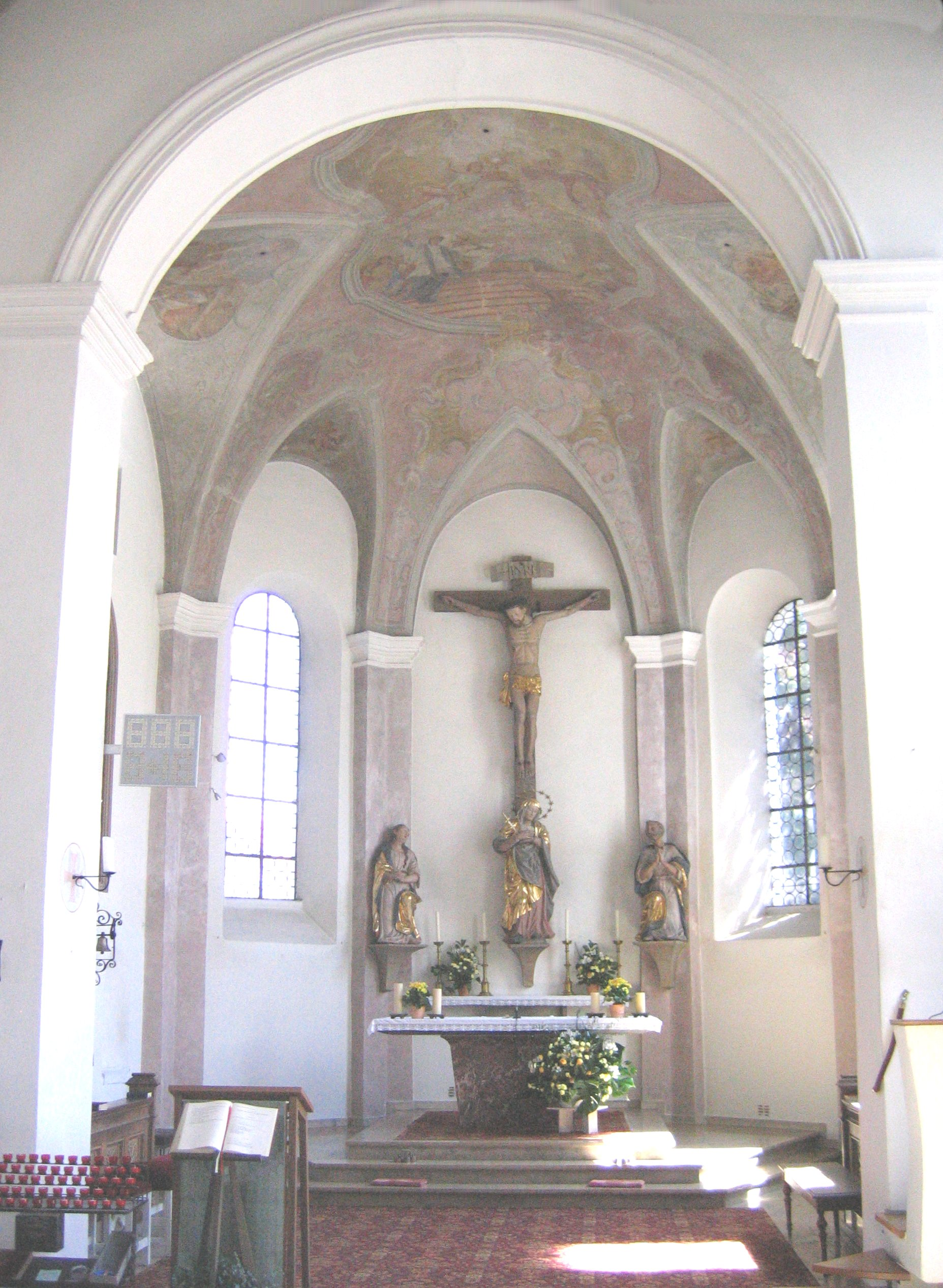
St Laurentius interior.
