= Tegernsee love letters =

1160–1186 German Latin letters

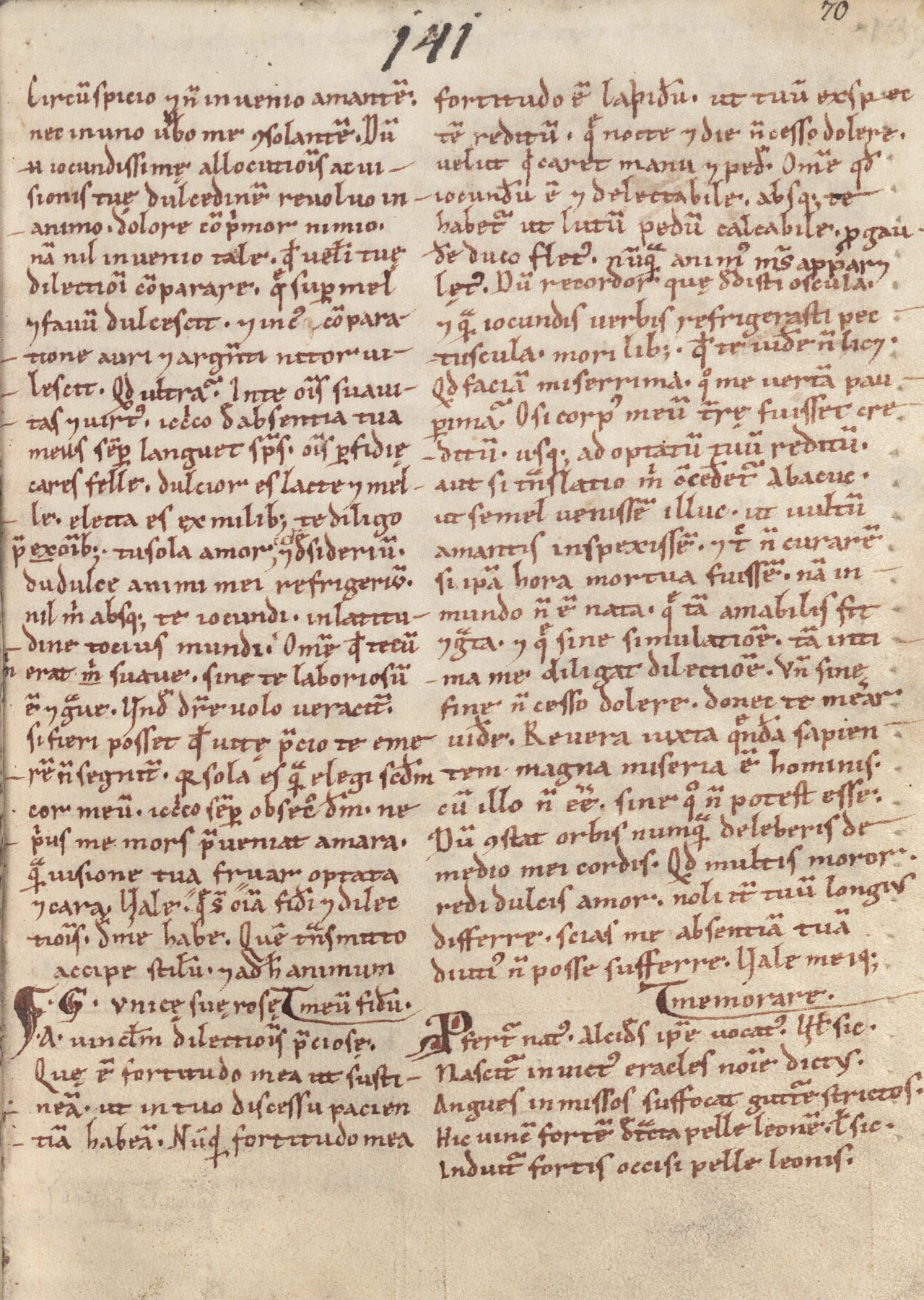
Letter 7 begins at the bottom of the left column: G. vnice ſue roſe ('To G., her only rose')

The Tegernsee love letters are a set of ten Latin "letters of love and friendship" copied at Tegernsee Abbey between 1160 and 1186. They are now in the Bavarian State Library manuscript Clm 19411. The love letters were copied (and mostly composed) by nuns or canonesses in Germany.

In addition to the love letters, the manuscript contains 307 letters on ecclesiastical matters; three treatises in the artes dictandi tradition by Alberic of Monte Cassino, Henricus Francigena and Adalbertus Samaritanus; a Greek abecedary; the Ludus de Antichristo; a lengthy excerpt from Otto of Freising's Gesta Friderici; plus poetry, proverbs and excerpts on theology, etymology and logic. The dating of the love letters is uncertain, but the three treatises on the artes dictandi were composed between 1110 and 1120.

The love letters are:

1. "H. to her Friend and Kinsman S", a letter by a young nun to a male relative, pleading for him to visit
2. "An Abandoned Friend N. to her Friend H.", a letter complaining of abandonment
3. "A Convent Student to Her Teacher", a response to a teacher who is seeking "absolute trust"
4. "The Teacher to His Female Friend", the letter of a spurned male suitor
5. "A Religious Woman to Another Young Woman", a "passionate letter of friendship" possibly written by G, the addressee of letters 6–7
6. "A Religious Woman B. to Her Friend G.", an even more passionate letter than 5
7. "A Religious Woman A. to Her Friend G.", an explicitly lesbian love letter that refers to "the kisses you gave me and the merry words with which you caressed my little breasts"
8. "A Religious Woman B. to Her Teacher", a prosimetrum addressed to a jealous male teacher and ending in some lines of Middle High German lyric, Dû bist mîn, ich bin dîn, that were probably added later
9. "The Teacher to the Woman", the teacher's response to letter 8, an attempt at seduction
10. "The Woman to Her Teacher", the woman's rejection of the advances in letter 9, sprinkled with German phrases

Letters 5–7 and 8–10 form groups. It is sometimes difficult to be sure of the nature of the relationship between writer and addressee because of the typical "high emotional temperature of medieval letters". Letter 7 is explicit, however, and is "one of very few surviving testimonies to a medieval lesbian relationship".

== Bibliography ==
- Dronke, Peter (2015). "Women's Love Letters from Tegernsee". In Christian Høgel; Elisabetta Bartoli (eds.). Medieval Letters: Between Fiction and Document. Brepols. pp. 215–245.
- Newman, Barbara, ed. (2016). Making Love in the Twelfth Century: "Letters of Two Lovers" in Context. University of Pennsylvania Press.
