= Quirinus of Rome =

Quirinus of Rome can refer to two saints:

- Quirinus of Neuss
- Quirinus of Tegernsee
