= Fall (Lenggries) =

Village in Germany

Coordinates: 47°34′10″N 11°31′57″E

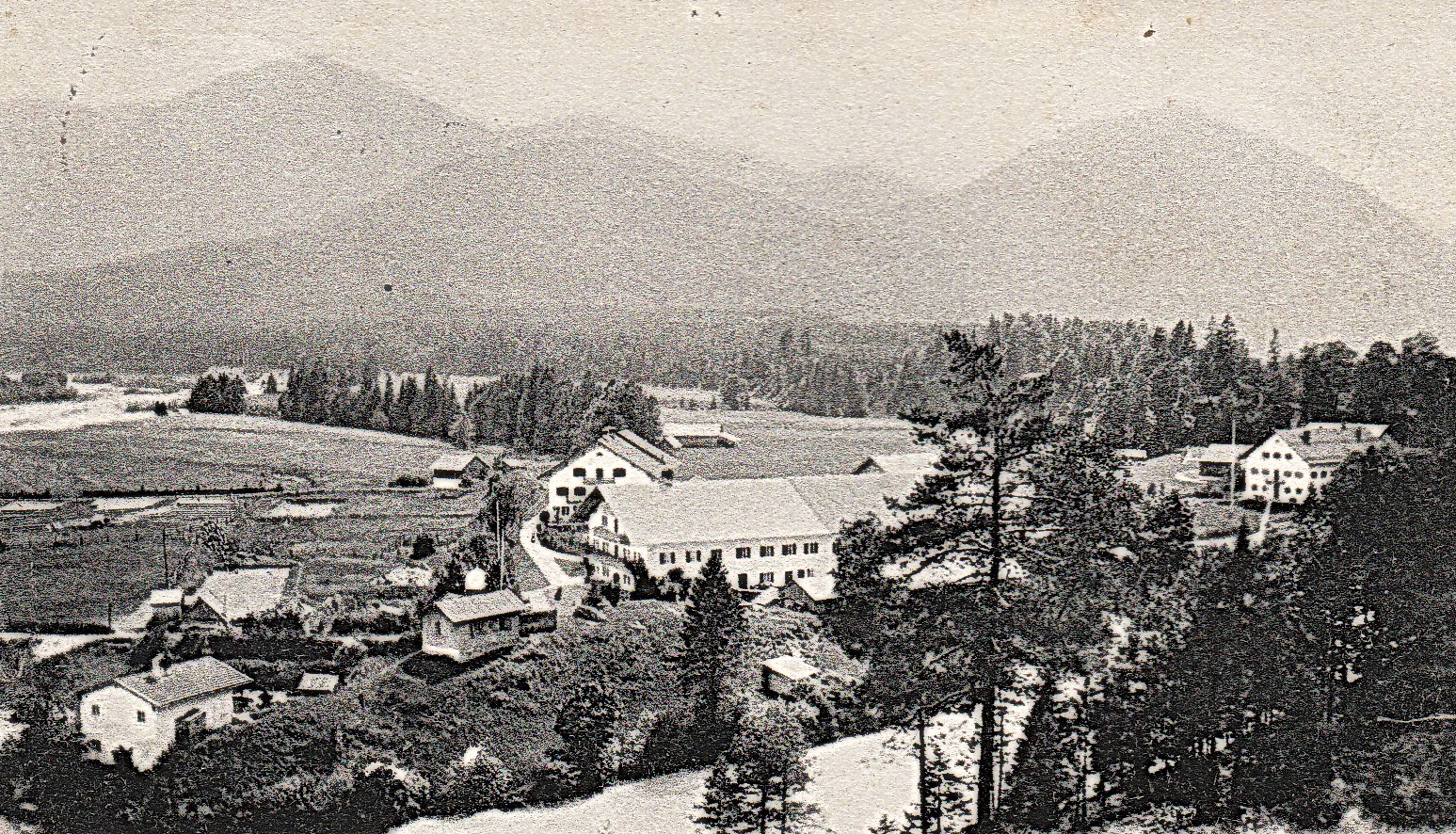
Fall, c. 1904

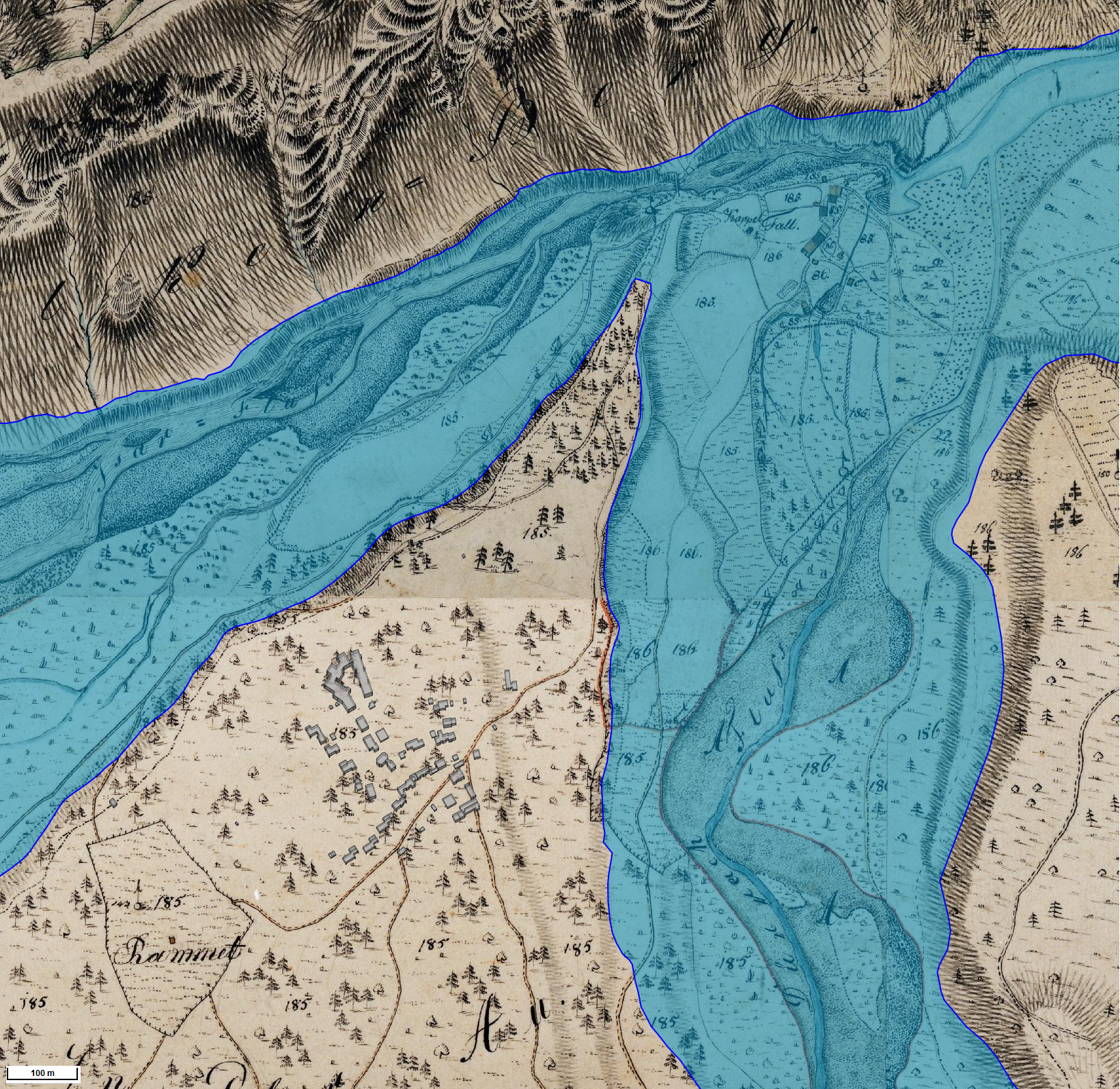
19th century map, with current lake and village superimposed

Fall is, or was respectively, a small village (Kirchdorf) in the Lenggries municipality in Landkreis Bad Tölz-Wolfratshausen, Upper Bavaria, Germany. It is located on an peninsula of Lake Sylvenstein.

It is named after Faller Klamm, which is located northward. It had previously been called Am Fall and Zum Faal. The village is first mentioned as a farm house, in 1280.

In 1954, the old village was abandoned due to the construction of the Sylvenstein Dam (Sylvensteinspeicher). The village was flooded intentionally in 1959 and rebuilt (using the same name) at a height of 773 metres and 100 metres away from the former location.

As of March 20, 2015, the village had a population of 111. The village is connected via Bundesstraße 307. A 329 metre long road bridge (built in 1959) named Faller-Klamm-Brücke spans the lake from the northeast.

== Literature ==
- Ludwig Ganghofer, Der Jäger von Fall. 1883. (Onlinefassung) (in German)
- Anton Böhm, Fall – Das versunkene Dorf. Selbstverlag, Rottach-Egern 2003. (in German)
- Anton Böhm, Fall – das Dorf und der Speicher (das Schicksal eines Dorfes). Selbstverlag, Rottach-Egern 2008. (in German)
- Stephan Bammer (Hrsg.): Die obere Isar - eine Zeitreise: Alt-Fall, Neu-Fall, Sylvensteinspeicher. Eder-Verlag, Lenggries 1997, ISBN 3-9805665-2-8. (in German)
- Vasco Boenisch, Martina Farmbauer, Versunkene Erinnerungen. Vor fünfzig Jahren verschwand ein ganzer Ort. In: Süddeutsche Zeitung. 14. November 2003. (in German)
- Neu-Fall, Oberbayern. In: Baumeister. Band 57, 1960, S. 540 f. (ISSN 0005-674X) (in German)
- Ein versunkenes Dorf taucht wieder auf. In: Süddeutsche Zeitung. 5. Dezember 2015. (in German)
