= Tegernsee Abbey =

Former monastery in Bavaria, Germany

Coordinates: 47°42′27″N 11°45′24″E

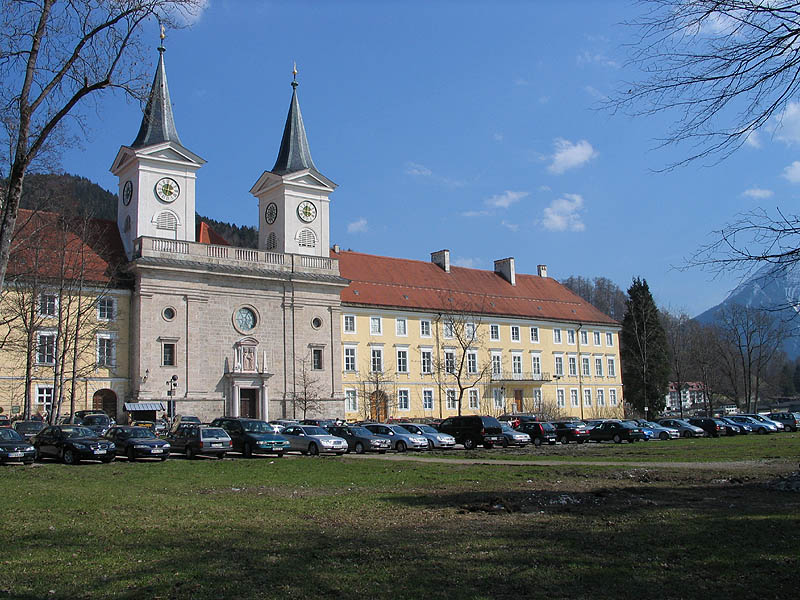
The Baroque style former Tegernsee Abbey and basilica

Tegernsee Abbey (German Kloster Tegernsee or Abtei Tegernsee) is a former Benedictine monastery in the town and district of Tegernsee in Bavaria. Both the abbey and the town that grew up around it are named after the Tegernsee, the lake on the shores of which they are located. The name is from the Old High German tegarin seo, meaning great lake.

Tegernsee Abbey, officially known as St. Quirinus Abbey for its patron saint St.Quirinus, was first built in the 8th century. Until 1803, it was the most important Benedictine community in Bavaria.

Today, the monastery buildings are known as Tegernsee Castle (Schloss Tegernsee) and are in the possession of Prince Max, Duke in Bavaria, a member of the Wittelsbach family. The local Catholic parish church of Saint Quirinus is in the former abbey church. In addition to the private quarters of the ducal couple, the former abbey premises now accommodate the Tegernsee Grammar School (Gymnasium Tegernsee) and the well-known Ducal Bavarian Brewery of Tegernsee, with a brew pub and a restaurant.

== History ==
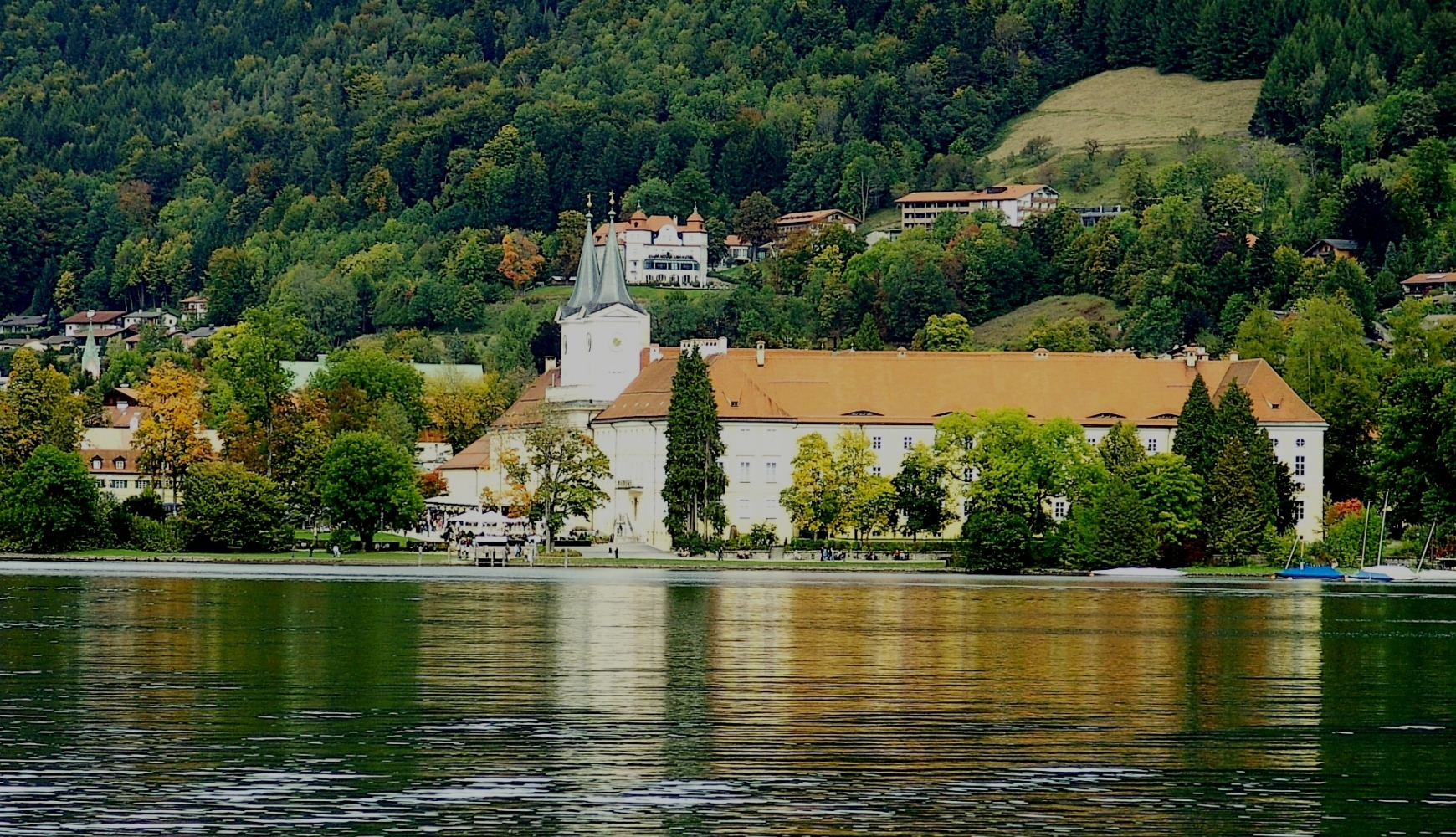
Tegernsee Abbey on the lake

=== Foundation and early history ===
On account of the disorders caused by the incursions of the Magyars at the beginning of the tenth century the founding of Tegernsee itself and the first decades of its history are hidden in deep obscurity. A fire in about 970 destroyed earlier evidence. The monastic community at Tegernsee was founded in 746 near the little Church of Our Saviour that was already in existence. The founders were the brothers Otkar (or Otocar), and Adalbert, of the family of the Huosi, one of the five old ruling clans of Bavaria.

This abbey was consecrated and occupied in 754. It was settled by monks from St. Gall and dedicated to Saint Quirinus a Roman martyr. It is well established that the founders of the abbey obtained the relics of Quirinus from Pope Paul I (757-67), and that these relics were translated from Rome to Tegernsee in the second half of the eighth century and were placed in the Church of Our Saviour, the first church of Tegernsee. Soon the monastery spread the message of Christianity as far as Tyrol and Lower Austria.

A well-known and detailed (but nevertheless entirely unverifiable) tradition about the foundation has developed. According to this tradition, Otkar and Adelbert were princes of the Huosi. They and their families lived at the court of Pippin the Younger, King of the Franks (714-768), whose son fell into a rage during a game of chess and killed the son of Otkar with the chessboard. Pippin, fearing the revenge of such a powerful family, he summoned Otkar and Adalbert before they could hear of the killing, and asked them for their advice: "How would you deal with a terrible evil if there were no way to change it?" The brothers replied: "All one could do in such a case would be to accept the evil with humility and submission to the will of God." Only then did Pippin tell them of the death of Otkar's son. The brothers, bound by their own judgment, were unable to take up arms and found themselves forced to accept the homicide. Instead, they decided to turn their backs on the world. They returned to their homeland in the south of Bavaria and founded a monastery on an unusually beautiful site by the shores of the Tegernsee, into which they withdrew. For many centuries a large panel in the nearby church of Egern depicted the scene of the princes playing chess.

The first abbot was Adalbert who took part in the Synod of Dingolfing in 770. Adalbert and his representative Zacho were present at the synod of St. Emmeram in Ratisbon (before 798). They were in the possession of Tegernsee which had been claimed by Bishop Atto of Freising. This demand was a result of the efforts of the episcopate of Bavaria of that era to limit as much as possible the parochial labours of the monasteries. The matter was adjusted by a settlement made at Tegernsee on 16 June, 804, on the occasion of the dedication of the Church of St. Peter at Tegernsee and the translation to it of the relics of Quirinus from the Basilica of St. Saviour.

After the fall of Tassilo III, Duke of Bavaria (748-788), Tegernsee became a Carolingian Empire royal monastery during the Carolingian Renaissance. The community was greatly weakened by Hungarian raids and by repeated attempts at secularisation during the reign of Arnulf, Duke of Bavaria (907-937). Besieged by frequent Hungarian raids and desperate to raise funds to finance a re-organized defense, Arnulf strengthened his power through confiscation of church lands and the secularization of numerous monastery estates. In the course of the 10th century suffered a sustained decline, culminating in the fire of around 970.

=== Middle Ages ===
Restored and re-founded, however, under Emperor Otto II (973-983) as an Imperial Abbey in 978, and re-settled by monks from St. Maximin's Abbey, Trier, Tegernsee entered a new period of growth. A charter of 10 June, 979 contains a grant from the emperor of the right of free election of the abbot, as well as freedom from taxes and the imperial protection, by which the abbey was withdrawn from the suzerainty of the rulers of Bavaria. With the activities of the monk Froumund (1006-1012) and Abbot Ellinger (1017-1026 and 1031-1041), the abbey became a centre of literature, manuscript production and learning, and was also active in the resettlement of other Benedictine houses in Bavaria, including the newly founded abbey of Saints Ulrich and Afra in Augsburg in c. 1012. Glass works were established at Tegernsee to make stained-glass windows for Bishop Gottschalk of Freising. The double doors of the cathedral of Mainz were cast at Tegernsee in 1014. In 1083 Abbot Gozbert established a bell foundry which, after Freising, was the oldest in Bavaria.

This golden age of the abbey lasted almost to the end of the 12th century. Among the literary and scientific works produced at that time were: "Ruodlieb" (considered the first German novel; last third of the 11th century); the Quirinals (12th century); "Play about the Antichrist" (1155?); and the Tegernsee letter collection (1178–1186), including the Tegernsee love letters. The well-known Tegernseespruch of Walther von der Vogelweide dates either from a little before 1206 or from c. 1212, and thus belongs, not to this period, but to the beginning of the period of decline that followed. Tegernsee was largely spared the political and ecclesiastical confusions arising from the conflict between Pope Alexander III (1159-1177) and Emperor Frederick I "Barbarossa," Holy Roman Emperor, and even managed to acquire substantial privileges from both pope and emperor.

The shape of the future was made plain with the appointment of Abbot Manegold of Berg, son of the Count of Berg, to this Bavarian abbey in 1189, as the result of political intrigue by the Counts of Andechs, Vögte (lords protectors) of Tegernsee, and Bishop Otto of Freising. The political and economic interests of the noble families of Berg, Andechs and Hohenstaufen, now came to dominate the abbey and as a result, it declined during the 13th and 14th centuries into little more than a private monastery dependent on a small number of noble families. To make matters worse, it burnt down in 1410.

=== Later history to dissolution ===
However, in 1426, Tegernsee received a Visitation from the Vicar-General, Johannes Grünwalder, which marked a new beginning. Over the next decades, with the support of the Papal Legate Cardinal Nikolaus von Kues, it became a focus of the Reforms of Melk Abbey, which opened Benedictine houses hitherto restricted to the nobility to a wider range of social classes. In 1455, monks of Tegernsee settled Andechs Abbey and were appointed abbots at Benediktbeuern, Oberalteich, Wessobrunn and others. In 1446, a Passion altar was dedicated. Johannes Keck (who was the Tegernsee delegate at the Council of Basle and died in 1450) wrote a work on music, and the Prior of Tegernsee, Bernhard von Waging (d. 1472) composed his mystical writings, including a defense of Cusanus' writings on "learned ignorance." The pilgrim and illustrator Anton Pelchinger taught music at Tegernsee. Around 1500 scribes of the monastery, including its librarian Konrad Sartori (died 1531), collated the Liber illuministarum - with 1.500 recipes one of the largest technical recipe manuals in Europe.

This second flowering continued into the Early Modern period. From 1573, the monastery had its own printing press, which thanks to Imperial privileges was allowed to print many books on theology, liturgy and the theory of music. The community survived the confusion of the Thirty Years' War (1618-1648), when the abbey was raided by Swedish soldiers. Tegernsee Abbey was also a prominent member of the Benedictine Bavarian Congregation, established in 1684.

=== Architecture ===
The former Carolingian style abbey church built at the end of the 10th century had been converted in the 11th to a Romanesque basilica, which in its turn had been re-fashioned between 1455 and 1460 into a Gothic church. The monastic buildings and the church were refurbished in the Baroque style between 1684 and 1688.

=== Secularisation ===
During the abbacy of Abbot Benedikt Schwarz (to 1787), the first signs began to show of the secularisation which eventually took place on 17 March 1803, thus bringing the abbey to an end. Gregor Rottenkolber, the last Abbot of Tegernsee, died on 13 February 1810. The greater part of the site was bought by Baron Drechsel for his brewery, but he later sold a small part back to an unofficial monastic community, which remained until 1861.

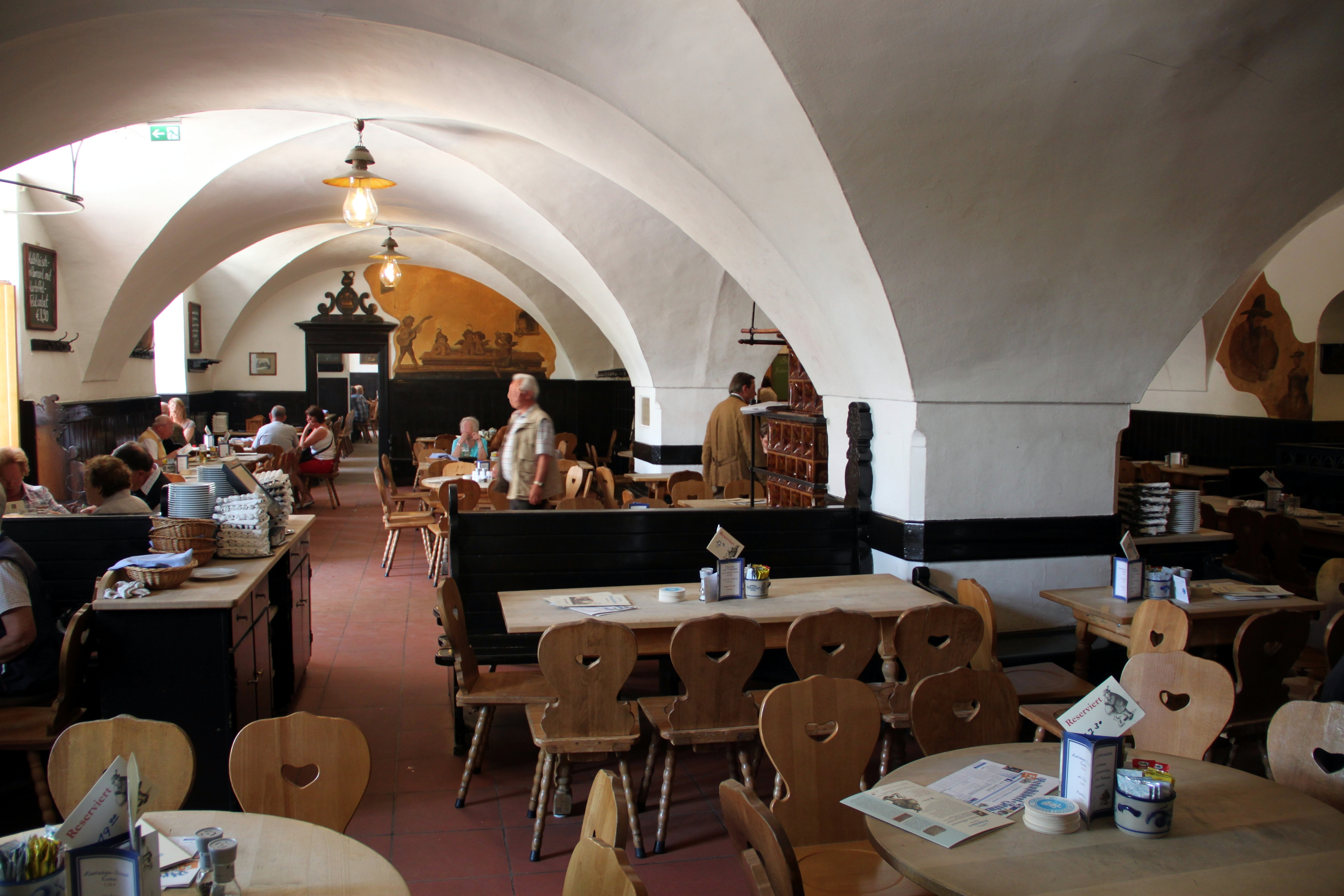
Herzogliches Bräustüberl

The buildings of the monastery itself were acquired in 1817 by king Maximilian I Joseph of Bavaria and later became a possession of the Dukes in Bavaria (a side branch of the ruling Wittelsbach family, the kings of Bavaria), attracted by the unusually beautiful location, and turned it into their summer residence. Known since then as Schloss Tegernsee, it is still the property of that family, the present owner is Prince Max, Duke in Bavaria. The building is home to the Ducal Bavarian Brewery of Tegernsee but also to the Tegernsee Grammar School, the church of St. Quirinus and a restaurant called Bräustüberl. The brewery is owned by Duchess Maria Anna Henriette Gabrielle Julie in Bavaria, youngest daughter of the duke.

== Abbots of Tegernsee ==
- Adalbert (762-800)
- Zaccho (800-804)
- Maginhart (804-, 823)
- Isker (826, 829)
- [gap]
- Megilo (866, -880?)
- [gap]
- Hartwic (978-982)
- Gozpert (982-1001)
- Godehard of Hildesheim (1001-1002)
- Eberhard I (1002-1003)
- Beringer (1003-1013)
- Burchard (1013-1017)
- Ellinger (1017-1026)
- Albin (1026-1031)
- Ellinger (2nd abbacy, 1031-1041)
- Altmann (1041)
- Udalrich I (1041/42-1042)
- Herrand (1042-1046)
- Egbert (1046-1048)
- Siegfried (1048-1068)
- Eberhard II of Eppenstein (1068-1091)
- Odalschalk of Hohenburg (1092-1113)
- Aribo of Neuburg-Falkenstein (1113-1126)
- Konrad I (1126-1155)
- Rupert of Neuburg-Falkenstein (1155-1186)
- Alban (1186-1187)
- Konrad II (1187-1189)
- Manegold of Berg (also Abbot of Kremsmünster and Bishop of Passau) (1189-1206)
- Berthold I (1206-1217)
- Heinrich I (1217-1242)
- Berthold II Schneck (1242-1248)
- Ulrich II Portenhauser (1248-1261)
- Rudolf (1261-1266)
- Heinrich II (1266-1273)
- Ludwig of Graisbach (1273-1286)
- Heinrich III (1286-1287)
- Marquard of Veringen (1287-1324)
- Heinrich IV of Rain (1324-1339)
- Sigibrand Geltinger (1339-1347)
- Carl Hauzendorfer (1347-1349)
- Konrad III Kazbeck (1349-1363)
- Konrad IV Eglinger (1363-1372)
- Gerhard of Taufkirchen (1372-1393)
- Oswald Torer (1393-1418)
- Georg Türndl (1418-1423)
- Hildebrand Kastner (1424-1426)
- Kaspar Ayndorffer (1426-1461)
- Konrad V Ayrenschmalz (1461-1492)
- Quirin I Regler (1492-1500)
- Heinrich V Kintzner (1500-1512)
- Maurus Leyrer (1512-1528)
- Heinrich V Kintzner (2. Mal, 1528-1543)
- Quirin II ( - )
- Paulus Widmann (1594-1624)
- Quirin III Ponschab (1624-)
- Bernhard Wenzl (1673-1700)
- Quirin IV Millon (1700-1715)
- Petrus von Guetrater (1715-1725)
- Gregor I Plaichshirn (1726-1762)
- Benedikt Schwarz (1762-1787)
- Gregor II Rottenkolber (1787 to 1803; last abbot; d. 1810)

== Burials ==
- Quirinus of Rome
- Duke Pius August in Bavaria
- Princess Amélie Louise of Arenberg
- Maximilian Joseph, Duke in Bavaria
- Princess Ludovika of Bavaria
- Duke Karl-Theodor in Bavaria
- Infanta Maria Josepha of Portugal
- Ludwig Wilhelm, Duke in Bavaria
- Louis-Alexandre Berthier, 1st Prince of Wagram

== See also ==
- List of Carolingian monasteries
- Carolingian architecture
- Carolingian dynasty
- Regional characteristics of Romanesque architecture
- 18th-century Western domes

== Sources ==
- Hemmerle, Josef, 1970. Die Benediktinerklöster in Bayern (= Germania Benedictina, Bd.2), pp. 297ff. Ottobeuren.
