= Philipp Bächstädt =

German television presenter (born 1982)

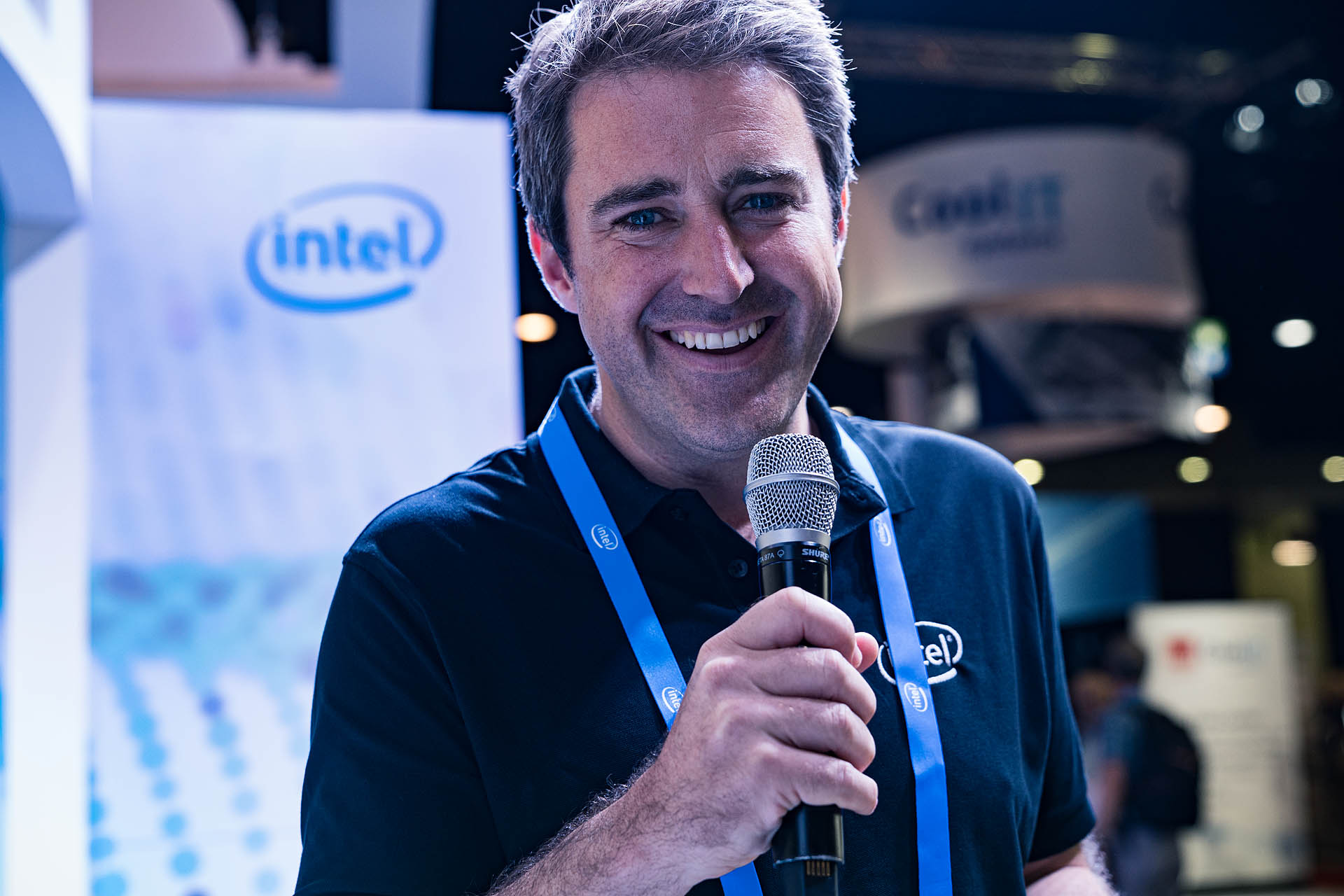
Philipp Bächstädt in 2019

Philipp Bächstädt (born February 1, 1982, in Tegernsee) is a German television presenter and producer.

== Life and work ==
Bächstädt initially trained at the Lausanne School of Hotel Management and studied business administration at the University of Kent in Canterbury. He began his journalistic career at the broadcaster n-tv and worked at the RTL regional studio in Munich from 2007. From 2010 to 2012 he moderated the show PS - Das Automagazin at n-tv. Since 2011 he has moderated the news magazine TV Bayern Live on RTL and, at the same time, the daily news program Im Blick on rheinmaintv since 2018.

From 2011 to 2015, Bächstädt was also managing director of an online shop and, from 2016, "director of sales and marketing" at TVT creative media. Since 2017 he has been working as a freelance presenter (also in English) and film producer. Among other things, he hosted the Red Carpet Show at the Laureus World Sports Awards.
