= Alpbach (Tegernsee) =

River in Germany

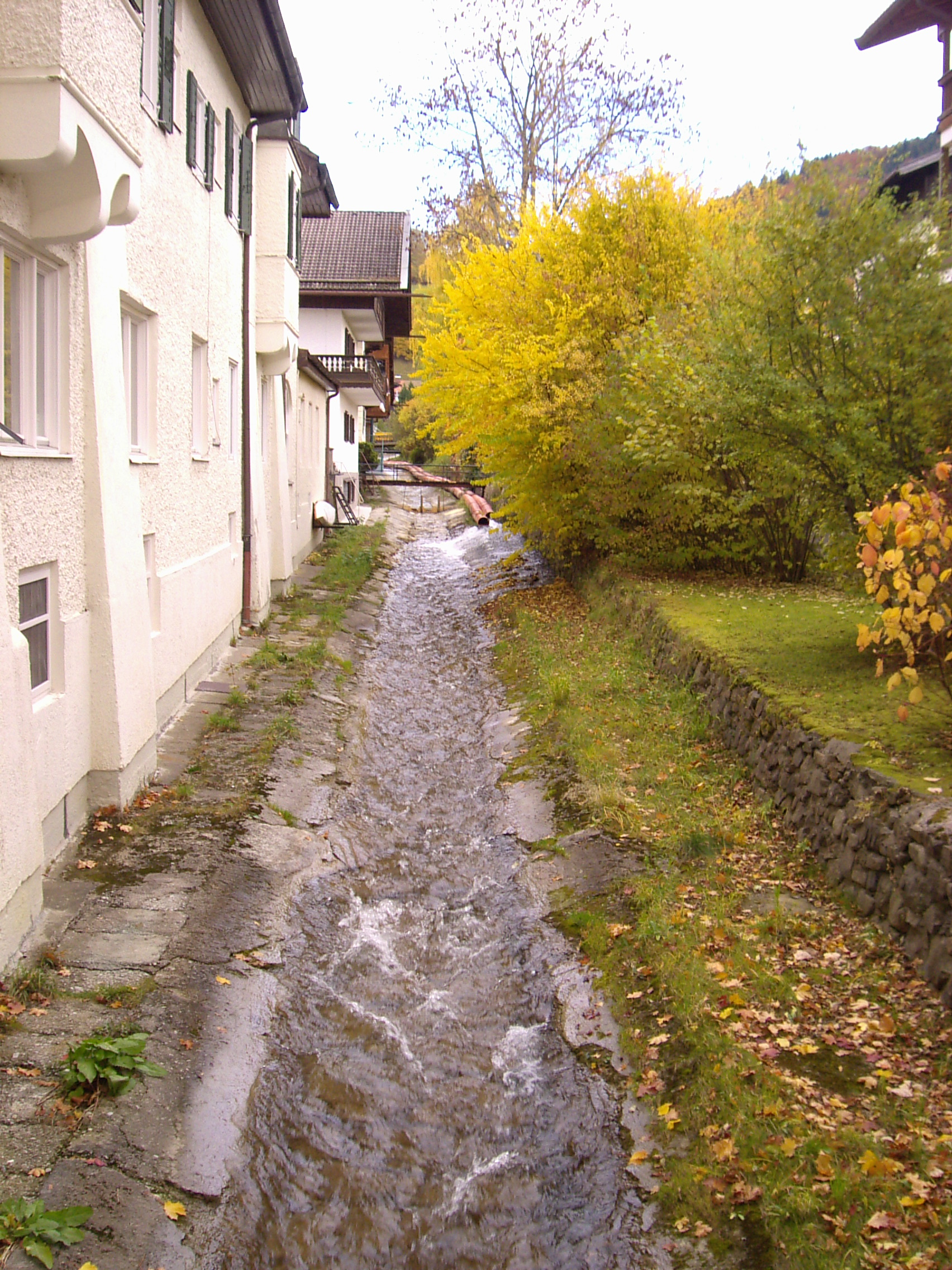
- The Alpbach in the town of Tegernsee

- Location of the mouth in Bavaria

Location
- Country: Germany
- State: Bavaria

Physical characteristics
- Mouth
  - location: Tegernsee
  - coordinates: 47.7104°N 11.7514°E
- Length: 4.8 km (3.0 mi)

Basin features
- Progression: Mangfall→ Inn→ Danube→ Black Sea

The Alpbach is a small river of Bavaria, Germany. It flows through the town of Tegernsee into the lake Tegernsee, which is drained by the Mangfall.

== See also ==
- List of rivers of Bavaria
