= Ducal Bavarian Brewery of Tegernsee =

Brewery in Tegernsee, Bavaria, Germany

Ducal Bavarian Brewery of Tegernsee Herzoglich Bayerisches Brauhaus Tegernsee KG
- Interactive map of Ducal Bavarian Brewery of Tegernsee; Herzoglich Bayerisches Brauhaus Tegernsee KG
- Type: KG
- Location: Tegernsee, Bavaria, Germany
- Coordinates: 47°42′30″N 11°45′24″E
- Opened: allegedly ca. 1050 – attestedly 1675
- Annual production volume: 130,000 hectolitres (110,000 US bbl)

Active beers
Name	Type
Tegernseer Hell	Helles
Tegernseer Dunkles	Dunkel
Tegernseer Export	Dortmunder Export
Tegernseer Pils	German-style Pilsner
Tegernseer Quirinus Dunkler Doppelbock	Doppelbock

Seasonal beers
Name	Type
Blauer Page	Bock

The Ducal Bavarian Brewery of Tegernsee (German Herzoglich Bayerisches Brauhaus Tegernsee KG) is a brewery in Tegernsee, Bavaria, Germany, located inside the north wing of former Tegernsee Abbey and owned by Maria Anna, Duchess in Bavaria, youngest daughter of Max, Duke in Bavaria.

== History ==
The business traces its roots back to a brewery that was allegedly founded in the year 1050 at lake Tegernsee, where in 746 the Benedictine Tegernsee Abbey had been established. However, the documented history can only be traced back to 1675, when abbot Bernd Wenzel relocated the monastery's brewery all the way from Holzkirchen to Tegernsee.

A Benedictine monastery did not invariably brew beer. In fact, in the days of the monastery, most monks in Bavaria favored wine over beer. Duke Maximilian I compiled a list of all Bavarian breweries in 1604, and Tegernsee was not mentioned. And if the monastery had already had a brewery, the relocation from Holzkirchen in 1675 would not have been necessary. So, it is assumed that there has not been a brewery here before the first half of the 17th century. [Source needed?]

Since then, the brewery has operated under a number of different names, including Tegernseer Klosterbrauerei ("Tegernsee Monastic Brewery"). After the secularization in the beginning of the 19th century, it was purchased in 1817 by Maximilian I Joseph of Bavaria from Karl Joseph von Drechsel and incorporated under the name Königlich braunes Brauhaus Tegernsee ("Royal Brown Brewhouse of Tegernsee"). Since then, it has been in the ownership of the House of Wittelsbach. The current owner, Duke Max Emanuel in Bayern, ensured a significant expansion of business in the last quarter of the 20th century.

== Corporation ==
Today's company behind the brewery is named Herzoglich Bayerisches Brauhaus Tegernsee KG and is still based in Tegernsee. In 2011 another filling line was erected in Gmund, only 5 kilometres (3 mi) away.

Inside the same building as the main production facility, restaurant Herzogliches Bräustüberl Tegernsee is located. The widely known Bräustüberl ("Brewpub") serves mainly Tegernseer Beer, yet is an independent company, led by Peter Hubert.

Beers of Brauhaus Tegernsee were for a long time mainly popular in the local district of Miesbach. Yet lately the brand is marketed all over Germany.

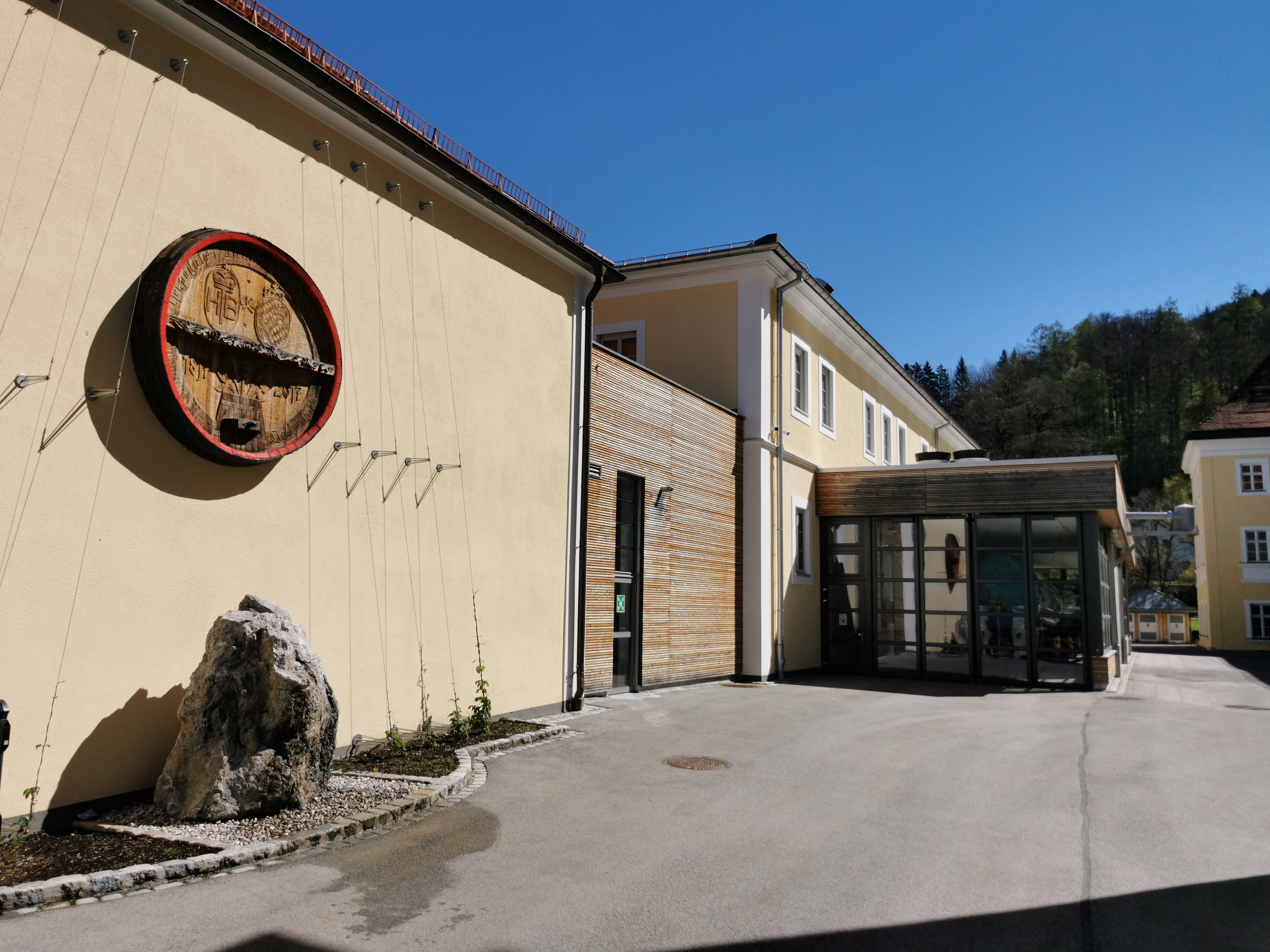
The brewery

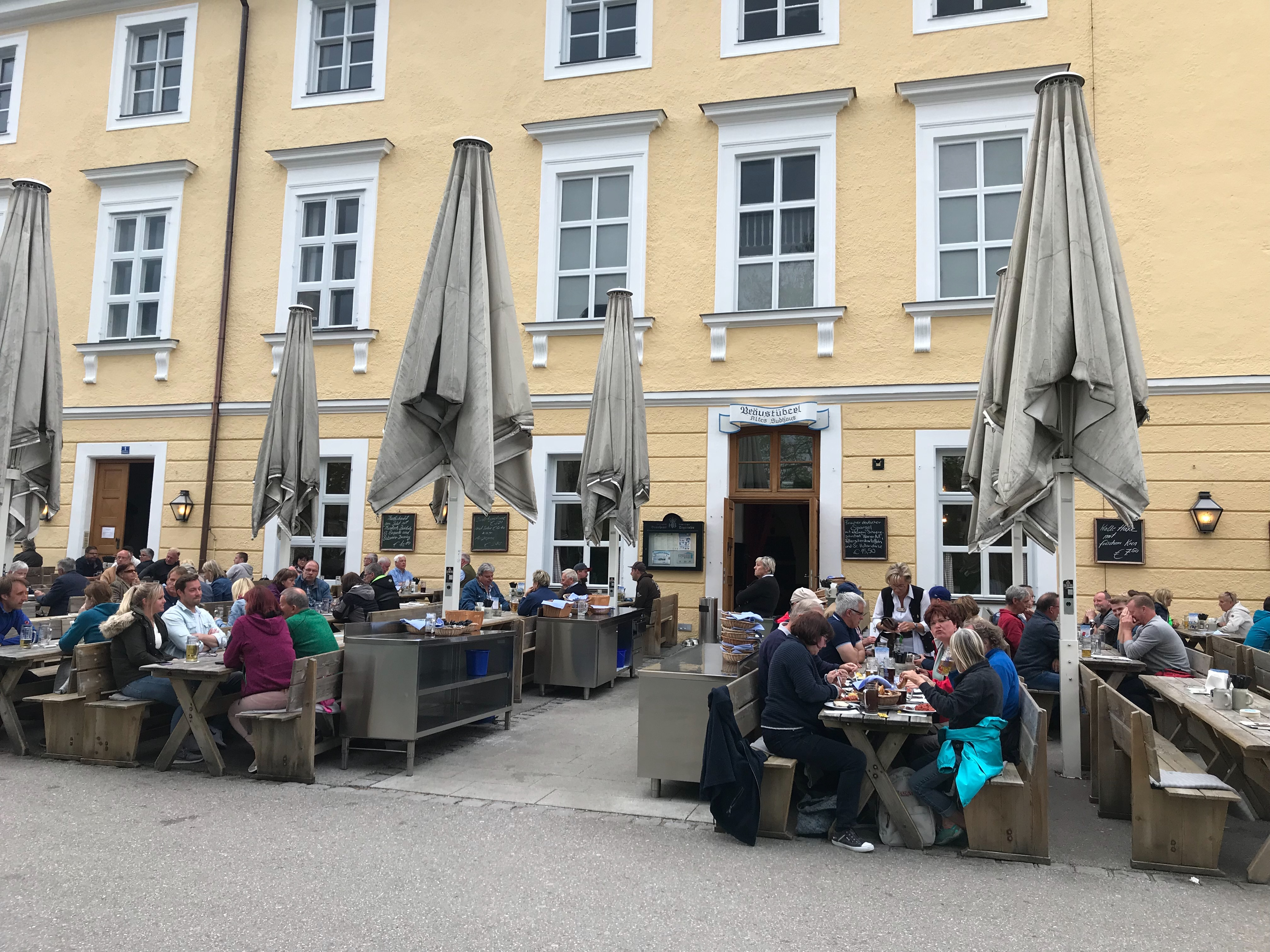
The restaurant (Bräustüberl)
