= Faller-Klamm-Brücke =

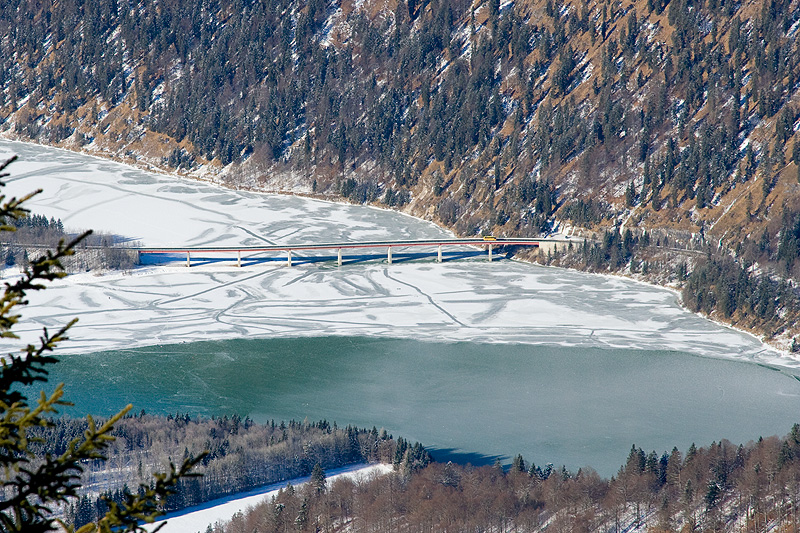
- Coordinates: 47.5763°N 11.5373°E
- Crosses: Lake Sylvenstein
- Named for: Faller Klamm
- Owner: Federal government of Germany

Characteristics
- Material: Reinforced concrete
- Pier construction: steel
- Total length: 329 metres
- Height: 768 metres
- No. of lanes: 2

History
- Construction end: 1957
- Opened: 1957
- Inaugurated: 1957

Statistics
- Daily traffic: Motor vehicles, bicycles
- Toll: 0

Faller-Klamm-Brücke is a road bridge near Fall in the Lenggries municipality in Landkreis Bad Tölz-Wolfratshausen, Upper Bavaria, Germany. The bridge bears Bundesstraße 307 and spans Lake Sylvenstein (with a water surface of 752.0 MASL) and has one lane per direction.

It has a length of 329 meters and was built in 1957.

== Literature ==
- Moll, Udo (1983), Brücken in Deutschland. HB Verlagsgesellschaft, Hamburg (Germany), pp. 8–9.
