= Saint Pimenius =

Catholic saint and martyr (4th century AD)

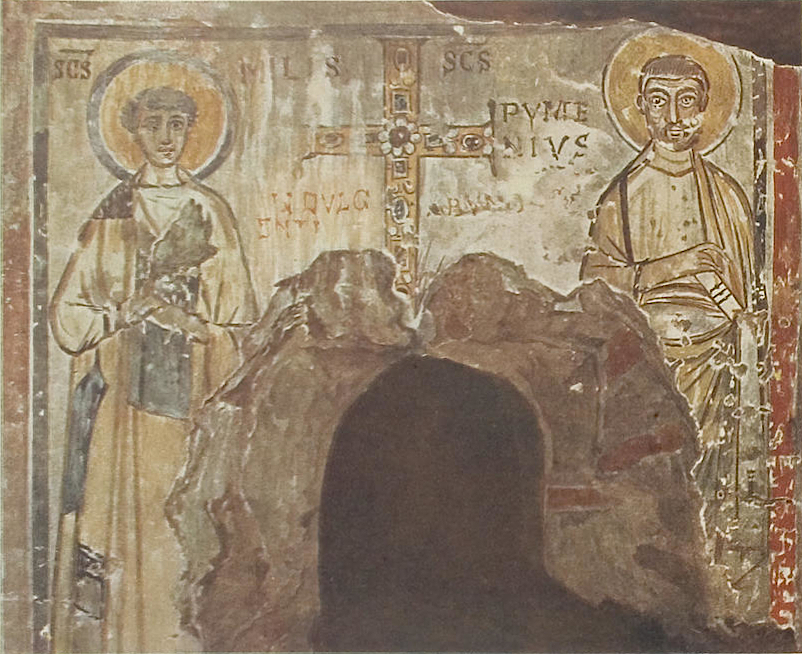
- Frescoe in the Catacomb of Ponziano, Saints Milis and Pumenius, from the book Die Malereien der Katakomben Roms (Tafeln), ed. by Joseph Wilpert, plate 255

Martyr
- Born: c. 4th century AD
- Died: 362 AD; Tiber River, Rome, Western Roman Empire
- Honored in: Catholic Church
- Canonized: Pre-Congregation
- Feast: 2 December

Saint Pimenius, also known as Pigmenius, Pigmentius, and Pigmène (c. 4th century AD – 362) is a saint and martyr venerated in the Catholic Church.

== Life ==
Pimenius was the tutor of Julian the Apostate, who later became Roman Emperor Julian and tried to revive Rome's traditional state religion. Pimenius ended up coming into conflict with Julian because the latter was a Christian. As a result, Julian had Pimenius drowned in the Tiber River in 362 AD. In the Catholic Church, Saint Pimenius is considered a pre-congregation saint, with a memorial on 24 March and a feast day on 2 December.
