= Ruodlieb =

Fragmentary Medieval romance in Latin verse

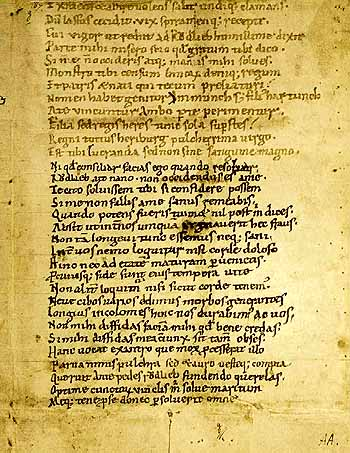
- Language: medieval Latin
- Date: 2nd quarter of the 11th century
- State of existence: fragmentary
- Manuscript(s): •Munich, Bavarian State Library, MS Clm 19486 (36 leaves), possibly originally from Tegernsee Abbey •St. Florian, Stiftsbibliothek (2 leaves)
- Verse form: leonine hexameters
- Subject: adventures of a knight from youth to adulthood

Ruodlieb is a fragmentary romance in Latin verse written by an unknown southern German poet who flourished about 1030. He was almost certainly a monk of the Bavarian Tegernsee Abbey.

The poem is one of the earliest German romances of knightly adventure, and its vivid picture of feudal manners gives it a certain value as a historical document. The poet was probably an eyewitness of the episode (II.4231–5221) which represents the meeting of the Emperor Henry II (d. 1024) with Robert II of France (d. 1031) on the banks of the Meuse River in 1023. Ruodlieb was left unfinished, and furthermore the manuscript was cut up and used for binding books, so that the fragments were only gradually discovered (from 1807 onwards) and pieced together.

== Contents ==
The framework of the story is borrowed from a popular Märchen. The young knight lives in exile away from home and takes service at the court of a just king. He is paid in wise saws instead of current coin. He also receives a loaf, which contains coins but is accompanied by instructions not to cut it until the knight has returned home. The proverbs, usually three in number, were increased in Ruodlieb to twelve, each of which was the starting-point of an episode by which the hero was made to appreciate its value.

When the knight has returned home and reunites with his mother, his next challenge in life is to seek a wife. However, he fails to find one until he encounters a dwarf, whom he traps. In return for his freedom, the dwarf reveals the whereabouts of a large treasure and utters the prophecy that the knight will marry Heriburg after he has slain her father and brother.

== Other examples ==
For examples of the three-proverb tale, see:

- William Bottrell, Traditions and Hearthside Stories (Penzance, 2nd series, 1873)
- Cuthbert Bede, The White Wife... (London, 1868)
- K. V. Killinger, Erin (Stuttgart and Tübingen, 1849),

and others in the French romance of the Saint Graal, in the Gesta Romanorum (the three proverbs bought by Domitian) and the old French Dit des trois pommes.
