= Ludus de Antichristo =

The Ludus de Antichristo (Play About the Antichrist) is a liturgical-oriented drama from the 12th century whose original author is unknown. Its origins are almost certainly from southern Germany, likely a product of the Benedictine monastery in Tegernsee, Bavaria—as the manuscript that contains the play was kept at the monastery. Most likely the play was written c. 1160 as much of the thematic material corresponds closely to events occurring during the reign of Emperor Frederick Barbarossa I and his troubles with Pope Alexander III. A roughly seventy-line fragment of the play is also extant in a thirteenth-century Gospel text from the St. Georgenberg Abbey in modern-day Fiecht, Austria—suggesting a link between the two monastic communities. Overall, the play is a critique of reform efforts instituted by the Papacy in the twelfth century that would potentially weaken monastic self-rule in favor of a more centralized Papal control over Christian instruction and education, specifically centered on the growth of cathedral schools. The monastery at Tegernsee had enjoyed suzerainty from Papal oversight since the tenth century—answering directly to the Holy Roman Emperor—and sought employ a propaganda effort amongst the many Benedictine communities in Bavaria and Austria in the form of a dramatic interpretation of eschatological events that were supportive of the Emperor as God's instrument in bringing about the final events Christian narrative, rather than those efforts of the Papacy (although the Emperor does actually submit to the Antichrist after fighting him in the first place). The long-standing designation of the play as a "liturgical" (dating back to the nineteenth century) is a result of the inclusion of several well-known liturgies popular amongst Benedictine monastic communities. But these liturgies reflect an "insider's knowledge" of their traditional means of performance, altering the reception of changes made by the author of the play so that the propagandistic messages are codified specifically for the monastic communities that surround Tegernsee. The drama warned its audience of the dangers posed by the Antichrist, a prophesied figure of evil whose coming (according to the Old and New Testaments) was an indication that the end of the world, or apocalypse, was near.
