= Kampen (mountain) =

Coordinates: 47°39′47″N 11°39′41″E

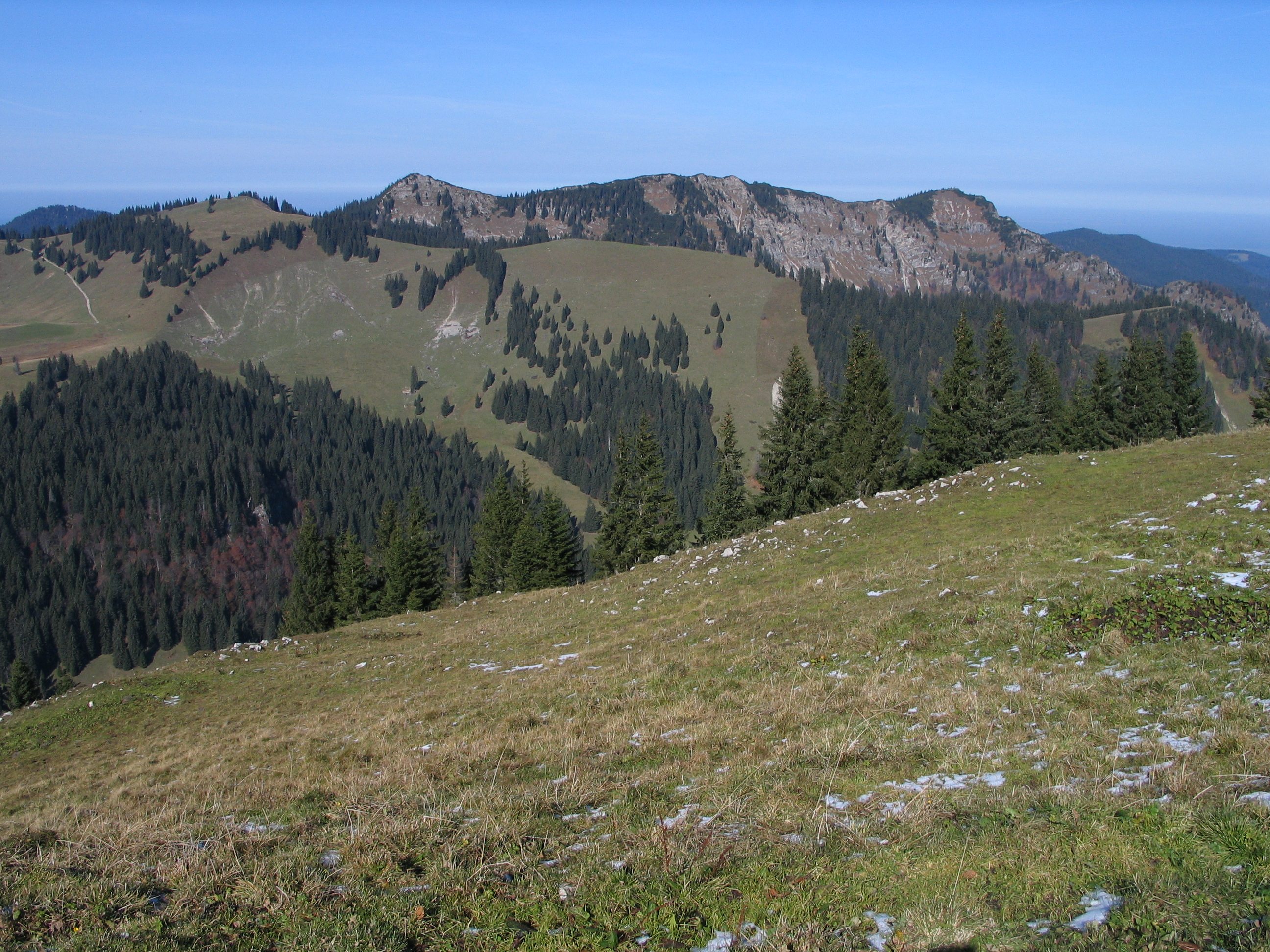

Highest point
- Elevation: 1,607 m (5,272 ft)

Geography
- Location: Bavaria, Germany

The Kampen is a mountain in Bavaria, Germany.
