= Sylvenstein Dam =

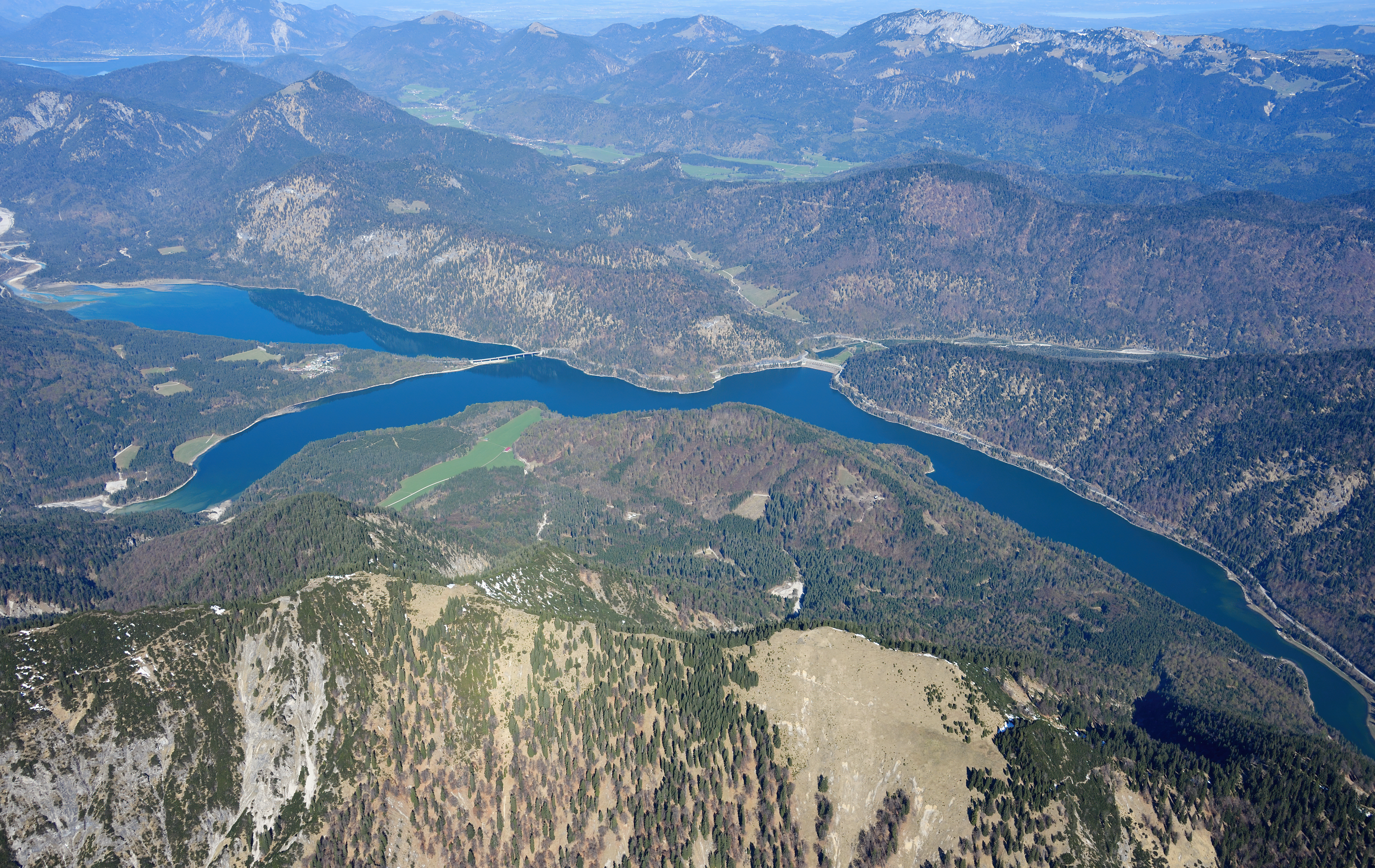

- Location within Germany
- Country: Germany
- Location: Bad Tölz-Wolfratshausen
- Coordinates: 47°34′40″N 11°32′28″E
- Construction began: 1954
- Opening date: 1959

Dam and spillways
- Type of dam: Embankment dam
- Height: 44 m (144 ft)
- Length: 180 m (591 ft)
- Dam volume: 1 hm^{3} (35,000,000 ft^{3})

Reservoir
- Total capacity: 124 hm^{3} (4.4×10^{9} ft^{3})
- Catchment area: 1,100 km^{2} (420 mi^{2})
- Surface area: 6.6 km^{2} (2.5 mi^{2})

Power Station
- Installed capacity: 7 MW

Sylvenstein Dam is an earthen and rockfilled embankment dam in the Isar valley, in the alpine part of Upper Bavaria, Germany which impounds the multipurpose Sylvenstein Reservoir (German: Sylvensteinspeicher). It was built with the primary aim of flood protection for the region. However, it also serves as a water reservoir for when water quality is lower downstream as well as a reservoir for hydroelectric power.

== Construction ==
In the 1920s, several hydropower plants were built in the tributary of the upper Isar River such as ones at the Achensee and Lake Walchen Power Plant. Therefore, the river ran nearly dry during the dry season, and the low water flow affected the town of Bad Tölz. A reservoir was established to ensure a minimum water level in the river. During the dry season, a volumetric flow of 4 cubic metres per second is released to prevent the Isar from running dry. Additionally, the reservoir provides flood control for the Isar River between Bad Tölz and Munich.

The dam is 44 metres (144 ft) high and 180 metres (590 ft) long. It was built between 1954 and 1959. Since 1959, the water has also been used to operate a hydropower plant of 3.2 MW. The plant was upgraded in 2000 with new turbines to generate 3.8 MW.

The dam has a core of processed moraine.

== History ==
During the 2005 European floods, the reservoir's maximum capacity was reached. Consequently, excess water was released into the Isar River. Without the dam construction, the flooding in 2005 would have been even more severe than it actually was.

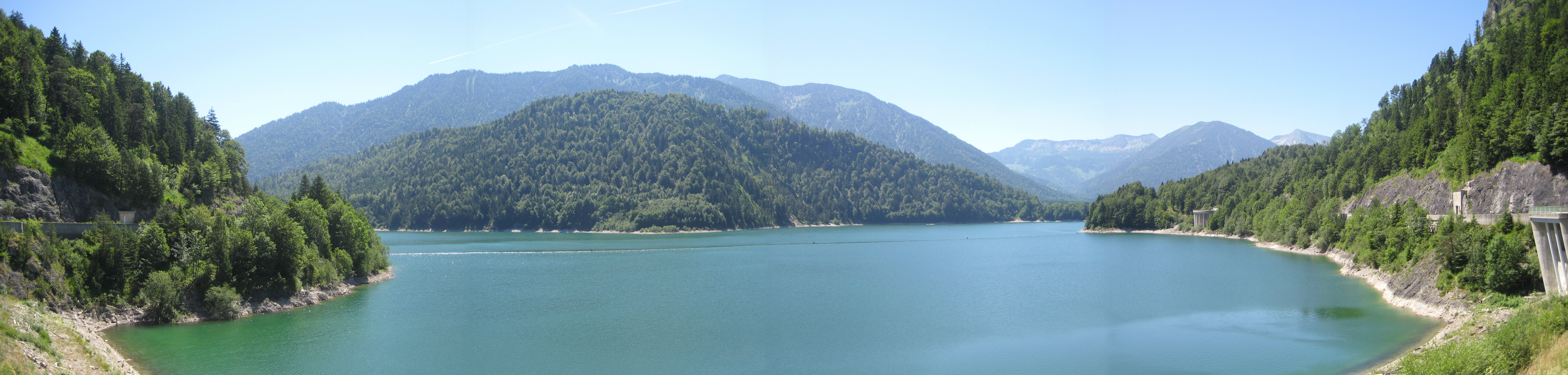
Sylvenstein Dam

A small village named Fall was flooded in 1959. The Faller-Klamm-Brücke connects road traffic to the North (Bundesstraße 307).
