= Bundesstraße 307 =

Federal highway in Germany

B 307
- Bundesstraße 307

Route information
- Length: 90 km (56 mi)

Major junctions
- West end: Vorderriß
- East end: Marquartstein

Location
- Country: Germany
- States: Bavaria

Highway system
- Roads in Germany; Autobahns; List; Federal; List; State; E-roads

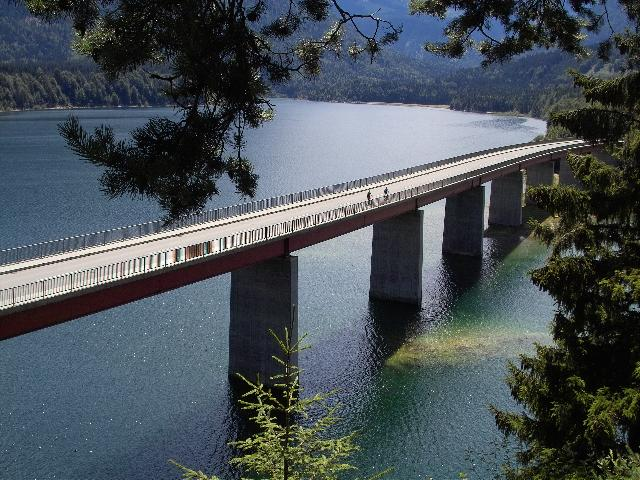
Bundesstraße 307 crossing the Sylvenstein Dam (Faller-Klamm-Brücke)

The Bundesstraße 307 is a German federal highway which crosses the Bavarian Alps in a west–east direction. It is composed of three separate segments.

The road begins in Vorderriß, where the continuation leads into the Austrian village of Hinterriß. It runs to the east along the river Isar and crosses the Sylvenstein Dam. Further to the east, the road is briefly interrupted by Austrian territory. From here, the road runs northward over the Achen Pass, passes through Kreuth and reaches Lake Tegernsee which it follows along the east coast. The first segment ends in Gmund at the Bundesstraße 318.

The second segment begins in Miesbach at the Bundesstraße 472. From here, the road continues to the south, passing the Schliersee, then runs to the east, through Bayrischzell and over the Sudelfeld Pass. Soon after, the second segment ends in the small village of Tatzelwurm. The continuation is a toll road leading north to Brannenburg.

A third, very short segment begins at the Austrian border near the village of Ettenhausen. It ends in Marquartstein at the Bundesstraße 305.
