= Quirinus of Tegernsee =

Martyr

Saint Quirinus of Tegernsee
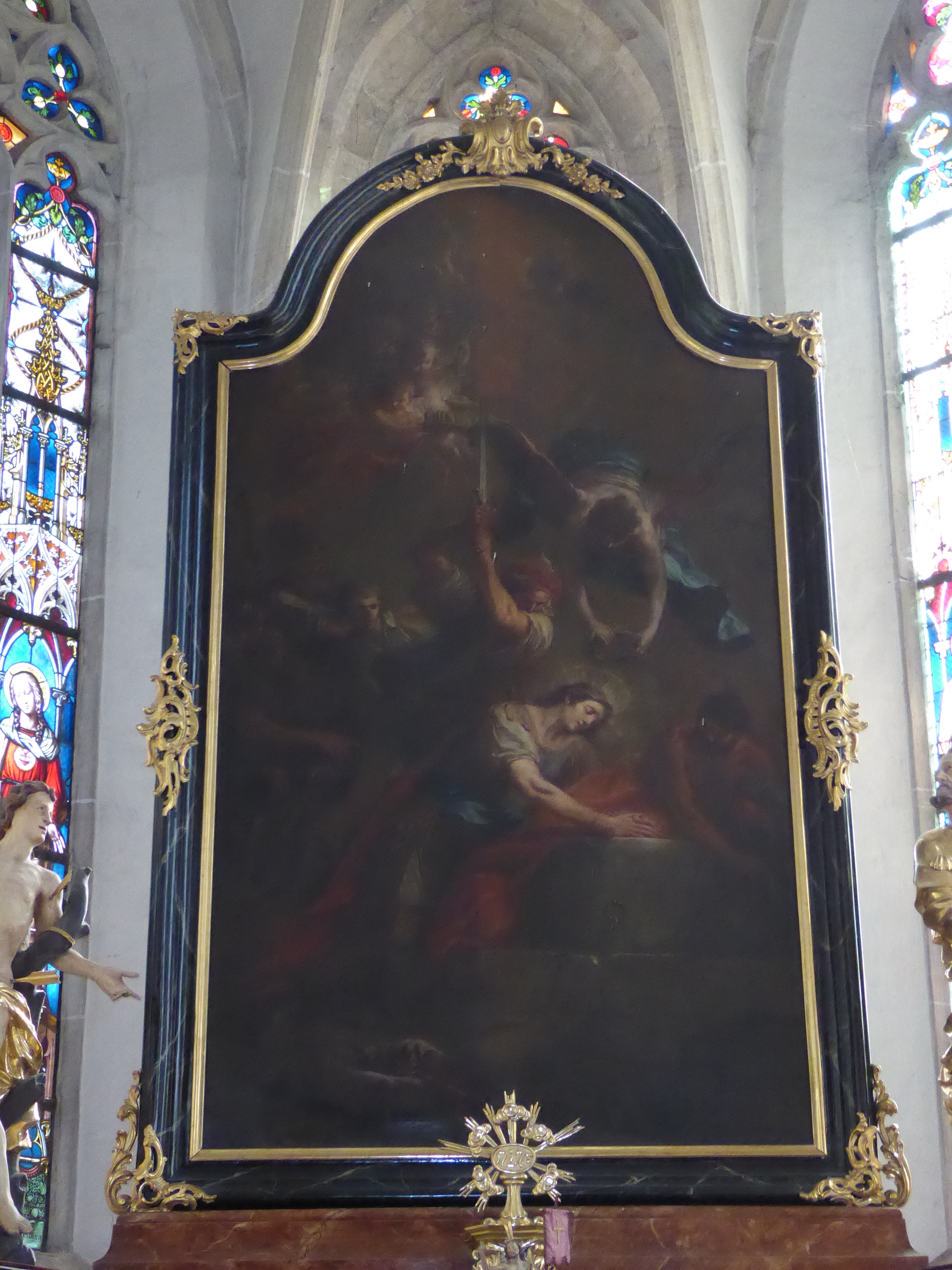
- Death of Saint Quirin, painting by Martin Johann Schmidt, 1782

Martyr
- Died: ~270 AD
- Venerated in: Eastern Orthodox Church; Roman Catholic Church
- Major shrine: Tegernsee, Bavaria
- Feast: March 25; June 16 (translation of relics)
- Attributes: orb, sceptre

Quirinus of Tegernsee, or Quirinus of Rome (not to be confused with Quirinus of Neuss, also sometimes called Quirinus of Rome), is venerated as a martyr and saint of the third century.

According to one tradition, he was beheaded during the reign of Claudius Gothicus (268-70). His corpse was thrown into the Tiber and later found at Tiber Island.

== Background ==
According to the legendary Acts of the martyrs Saint Maris and Saint Martha, a Roman martyr Quirinus (Cyrinus) was buried in the Catacomb of Pontian. However, the Itineraries to the graves of the Roman martyrs do not mention him.

His legend was later connected with Tegernsee Abbey in Bavaria, where his relics had been translated in the eighth century, during the reign of King Pippin and Pope Zacharias. However, German scholar Ulrich Schmid says

"... it is a perfectly well established fact that the founders of the abbey obtained the relics of St. Quirinus, a Roman martyr, from Pope St. Paul I (757-67), not from Pope Zacharias (741-52), and that these relics were translated from Rome to Tegernsee in the second half of the eighth century and were placed in the Church of Our Saviour, the first church of Tegernsee."

== Veneration ==
His feast is celebrated on March 25. Perhaps this Quirinus is meant by the expression "Romæ sancti Cyri".

Quirinus' cult flourished from its center at Tegernsee, and a larger stone church was built in 1450 to house his coffin.

== Gallery ==
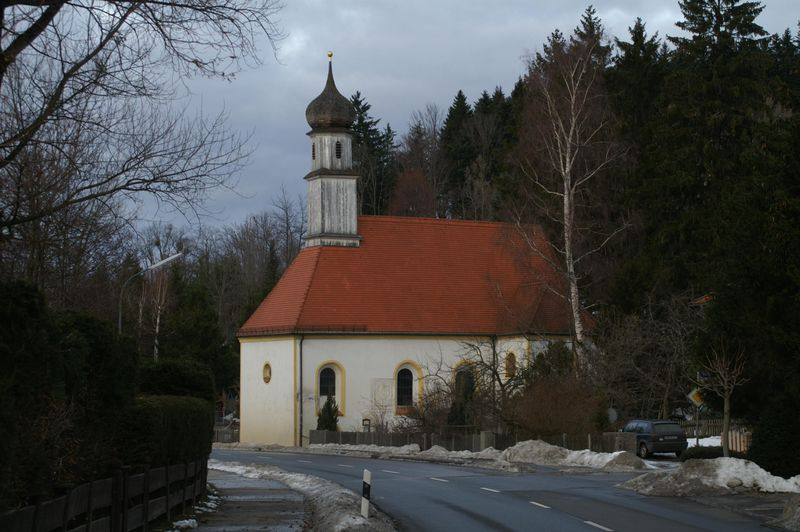
Chapel of St Quirinus, Tegernsee
