= Julius Mayr =

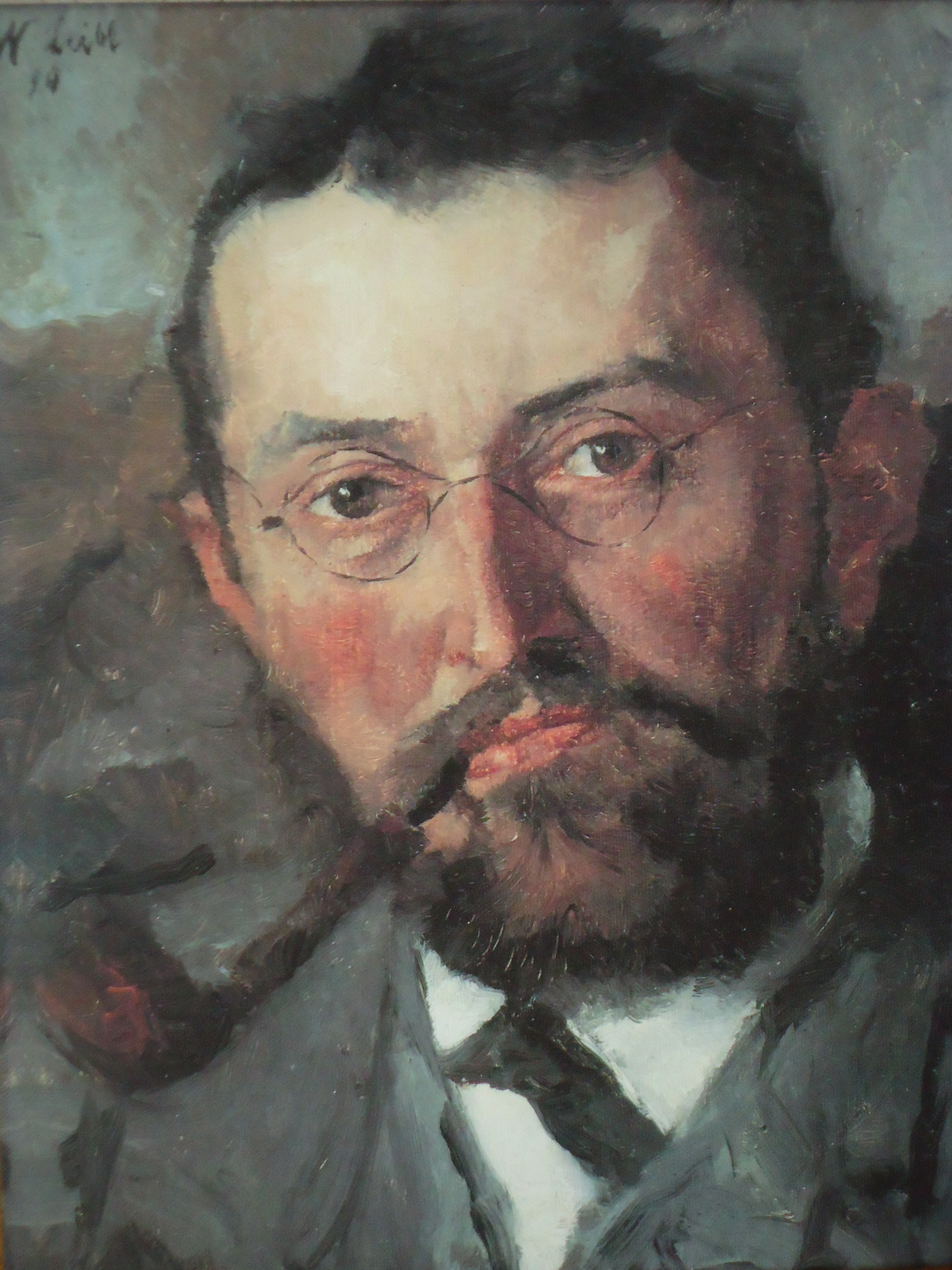
Portrait of Julius Mayr by Wilhelm Leibl

Julius Mayr (7 January 1855 – 8 May 1935) was a German physician, chairman of the German Alpine Club and writer who wrote a biography of the painter Wilhelm Leibl.

== Biography ==
Julius Mayr was born in Rotthalmünster (Lower Bavaria) as the fourth child of the district court physician Dr. Karl Mayr. His mother died from typhoid fever in 1856 when Mayr was only 14 months old.

Mayr attended primary school in Rotthalmünster (1861 to 1865), and the Ludwigs-Gymnasium (high school) in Munich from 1869 to 1873. In 1873, he began his military service as a one-year volunteer. Following that year, he started medical studies at the Ludwig-Maximilians-Universität München, completing his education in 1878. One year later, in 1879, he obtained a PhD, with a dissertation on “Historical Sketches of Erysipelas.“ He continued his medical education at the universities of Vienna, Berlin, Prague and Budapest. From 1880 to 1897, he was a general practitioner and ophthalmologist in Rosenheim (Upper Bavaria), a community insurance doctor, a medical officer of the Royal Bavarian Landwehr, a railway doctor, a factory doctor of the match factory Hamberger, and a general practitioner at the Marienbad. During this time, he lived in a house located at Innstraße 11 in Rosenheim.

In October 1880, Mayr married Auguste Hiedl, daughter of a country judge in Passau. Together they had two daughters: Helene (surname Weller after her first marriage, and Wohnlich after her second marriage) and Luise (surname Hundt after her marriage). From 1887 to 1897 and from 1907 to 1912, Julius Mayr was the Chairman of the Rosenheim branch of the German Alpine Club; which, at that time, was called the "German and Austrian Alpine Club". Between 1885 and 1900, he developed friendships with people including Wilhelm Leibl, Johann Sperl, and Max Liebermann. Julius Mayr became acquainted with the Steinbeis family (industrial owners of the Wendelstein Rack Railway) and others. Between 1890 and 1891, Wilhelm Leibl painted portraits of Julius Mayr as well as of Auguste Mayr. The portrait of Julius Mayr is in the Museum Georg Schäfer, Schweinfurt; the portrait of Auguste Mayr has gone missing.

== Timeline of important events in Mayr's life ==
1894: Inauguration of the Brünnsteinhaus, the construction of which was supervised by Mayr.

1898: Inauguration of the secured mountain path, "Dr Julius Mayr Weg", which leads from the Brünnsteinhaus (1,360 m) to the summit of the Brünnstein (1,634 m).

1897-1903: Royal Bavarian districts medical officer first class in Bogen (Lower Bavaria); upon his written application, Mayr was appointed in this function by Luitpold, Prince Regent of Bavaria.

1901-1903: Leave of absence due to serious illness of esophagus and gastric problems.

1 January 1904: retirement.

1901-1935: Julius Mayr is residing in Brannenburg am Inn (Upper Bavaria).

1906: The first edition of Julius Mayr's biography of the painter Wilhelm Leibl appears. Three more editions follow until 1935, all of which published by F. Bruckmann publishers, Munich.

1920s/early 1930s: Friendship with amongst others Josef Hofmiller, Eduard Stemplinger, Ludwig Steub.

1924: Publication of a selection of Mayr's stories under the title Auf stillen Pfaden (Along quiet paths), published by Rudolf Rother Alpine Publishers, Munich.

Ca. 1930: Tragedy in five acts "Sigbot von Falkenstein" (unpublished).

1932: August Mayr dies of leukemia. Julius Mayr dedicates to her a biographical sketch/essay "Sie. Eine bürgerliche Frau von Adel" (She. - A middle-class woman of nobility). Auguste Mayr was buried in the cemetery of Rosenheim.

1935, 8. May: Julius Mayr dies. He is buried at the cemetery of Rosenheim.

== The physician ==
Due to his education as a court physician, a surgeon, and his additional specialisation in ophthalmology, Julius Mayr was able to perform laparotomies, amputations, squint and cataract surgeries. He was highly regarded as a competent physician and his patients came from far.

The routine assessments carried out by the Royal Governments of Upper and Lower Bavaria attest to his outstanding educational and medical qualifications and hence his aptitude for the position of Royal District Medical Officer, First Class, for which Julius Mayr had successfully applied (job location Bogen/Lower Bavaria). Diverticula in his esophagus and the daily need to self-introduce a probe and flush his stomach forced him to give up his profession. Mayr published many medical papers and gave many lectures, always taking care to implement the latest medical and technical knowledge, and to preserve medical empathy and the "arts of medicine".

== The hiker, mountaineer and Alpine Club official ==
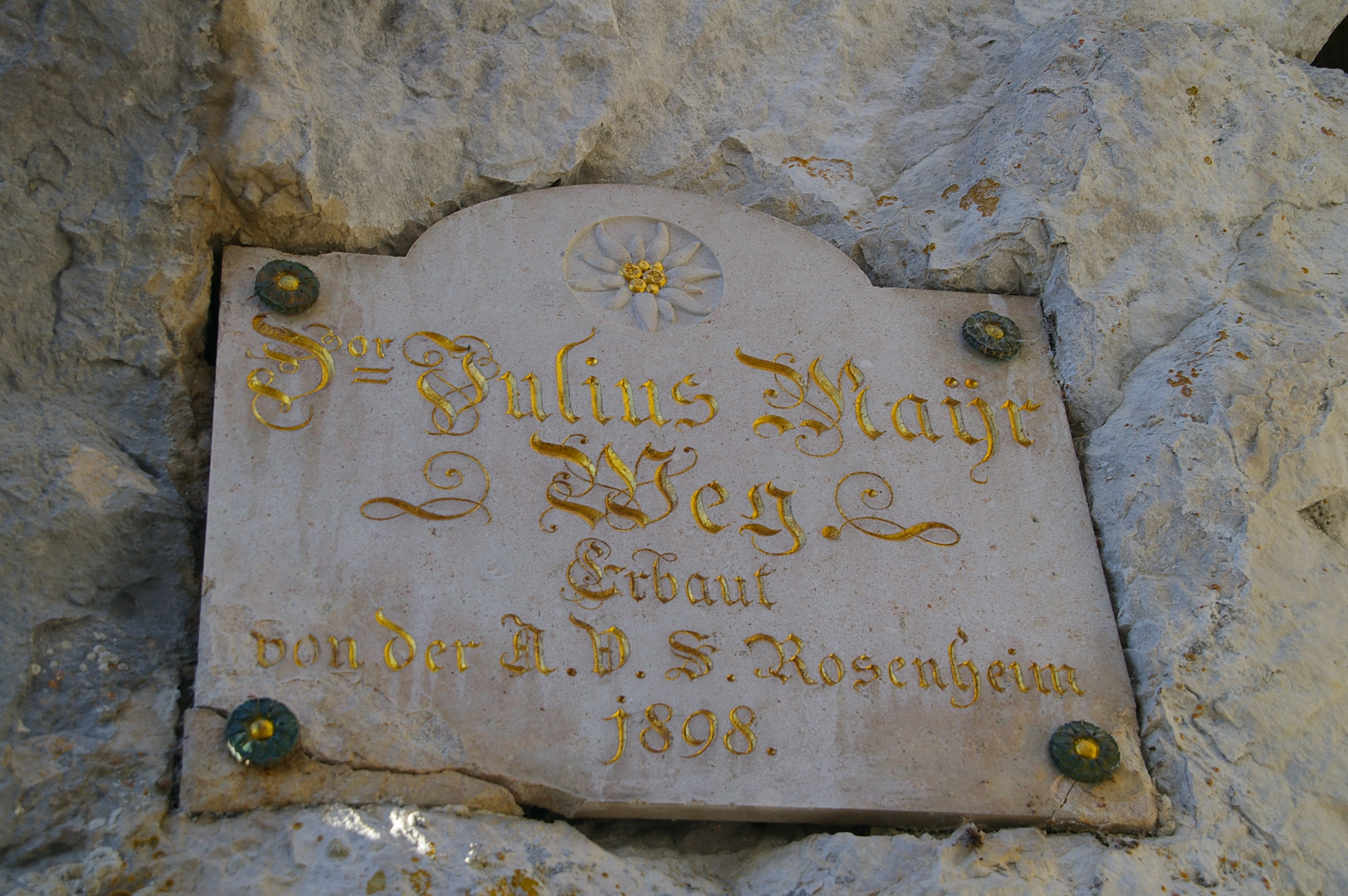
Memorial plate on the "Dr Julius Mayr Weg"

While living in Rotthalmünster, young Julius must have inherited a strong love for the mountains, for hiking and nature from his father. At the age of only 17 years, Julius Mayr reached the summit of the Großvenediger (3,666 m). After that, Rosenheim and the Inn Valley became the starting point for "mountaineering trips" throughout the entire Eastern Alps, the Pre-Alps, and also the Mountains of Abruzzo (Gran Sasso d'Italia). For him the mountains were not so much a challenge for physical or sporting excellence, but he considered them to be the places par excellence to experience creation in all its diversity, size and beauty, both living and (seemingly) inanimate in nature.

As the Chairman of the Rosenheim branch of the German and Austrian Alpine Club, Julius Mayr became the founding father of the Brünnsteinhaus (the location of which he had chosen, the construction of which he had supervised and the construction of which he had organized in its inauguration in 1894). The secured mountain path from the Brünnsteinhaus (1,360 m) to the summit of the Brünnstein (1,634 m), completed in 1898, still bears his name: Dr Julius Mayr Weg.

== The writer ==
Julius Mayr's biography of his friend, hunting and hiking companion Wilhelm Leibl (title: Wilhelm Leibl. His Life and His Work) has been for a long time the most important biography of that famous painter. The biography first appeared in 1906, almost six years after Leibl's death. It not only describes the life and work of the master, but it also recounts the friendship between Johann Sperl, Leibl and Julius Mayr.

The 4th edition of the biography was published by Bruckmann publishers, Munich in 1935 - shortly after the death of its author, Julius Mayr. His many mountain walks (for example on the mountains of the Chiemgau, in the Inn Valley or the Mangfall Mountains), and also his hikes across the Pre-Alps (in the Adige Valley or in the Wachau) have not only inspired Julius Mayr's lectures (for the members of the Alpine Club), but also inspired his story writing.

Only part of these stories has been published in the collection Along Quiet Paths(German: Auf stillen Pfaden) (published by Rudolf Rother Alpine Publishers, Munich 1924). Many of his remaining publications are scattered throughout various magazines and newspapers, notably many of the bulletins of the Alpine Club.

In his stories Julius Mayr drew vivid, often lyrical and moody images, partly sketched in romantic hues. His accounts describe in a loving, even humorous, manner mostly simple people, mixing high German with colloquial German and slightly stylizing the Bavarian dialect, but also introducing historical / cultural / historical knowledge, sober facts and humanistic reflections. Mayr often cited Goethe, and inserted for example quotations of Goethe's Faust or the West-Eastern Divan.

Julius Mayr's lyrical talent is recorded in numerous poems. The play that he had written that remained unpublished (entitled Sigbot von Falkenstein) is largely unknown. It concerns the tragic end of the last representative of the once powerful dynasty of the Counts of Falkenstein, during the second half of the 13th century. In it, Mayr used in a creative manner the historical sources of which he had such excellent knowledge.

The language, rhythm and motifs he used distinctly echo known classics, especially Schiller (William Tell, Die Piccolomini) and Goethe (Gretchen Tragedy).

== A visionary critic of his time ==
In his diary Julius Mayr condemned Kaiser Wilhelm II and the aristocratic cliques of that era. As early as 1905, he felt the approach of World War I.

In the early 1930s, Mayr spoke out passionately against the hypocritical, demagogic and ruthless activities of the Nazis. In 1934, Julius Mayr predicted the coming of the Holocaust. Even in the final scene of Sigbot von Falkenstein he alludes to arson, murder and the terror taking place at that time.

== Publications (selection) ==
- Wilhelm Leibl. Sein Leben und sein Schaffen. Cassirer, Berlin 1906; 2nd edition 1914; 3rd edition 1919; 4th edition F. Bruckmann Publishers, Munich 1935.
- Auf stillen Pfaden. Wanderbilder aus Heimat und Fremde. Rudolf Rother Alpine Publishers, Munich 1924.

=== Literature ===
- Hans Heyn: Rosenheim. Stadt und Land am Inn. Rosenheimer Verlagshaus, Rosenheim 1985, pp. 36–37, 141.
- Ludwig Hieber: Das Brünnsteinhaus 1894-1994. Die Geschichte einer Alpenvereinshütte im bayerischen Inntal. Anniversary publication of the German Alpine Club, Rosenheim branch, Rosenheim, August 1994.
- Dieter Vögele: Dr. Julius Mayr - Sein Leben und sein Schaffen. 180 page photo collection on the Dr. Julius Mayr exhibition at the Rosenheim City Archives, Rosenheim, July 2014 (online).
- Gerold Zue: Dr. Julius Mayr - der vergessene Schriftsteller. In: Passauer Neue Presse (paper) of 17 March 2012, p. 25.

== Sources ==
- Estate of Julius Mayr in the Rosenheim City Archives.
- Helmut Papst: Brannenburger Notizen (estate of Helmut Papst in the hands of Ms Schannagl, Brannenburg).
- Chronicle of the Steinbeis family (archives of the Steinbeis family, Brannenburg).
- Address directories of the city of Rosenheim for the years 1890, 1893 and 1896 (can be consulted in the City Archives).
- Bavarian Main State Archives, Munich, Files of the Royal Bavarian State Ministry of the Interior (M Inn 60879) Dr. Julius Mayr.
- Munich State Archives, in particular files of the local court Rosenheim, files concerning the estate of Dr Julius Mayr, retired district medical in Degerndorf; State Archives Landshut, Government of Lower Bavaria, Directorate of the Interior, file number A 2011, File of the Royal Government of Lower Bavaria, Directorate of the Interior, Mayr Dr. Julius.
