= Breitenstein =

Breitenstein may refer to:

- Breitenstein, Lower Austria
- Breitenstein, a locality (Ortschaft) in Aigen-Schlägl, Upper Austria, Austria
- Breitenstein, Saxony-Anhalt, a municipality in Germany
- Breitenstein (mountain), a mountain in the Bavarian Alps
- Breitenstein (Swabian Alb), a mountain in Baden-Württemberg, Germany
- Breitenstein, a small town in Weil im Schönbuch, Baden-Württemberg, in Germany
