= Wendelstein Rack Railway =

Cog railway in Bavaria, Germany

Coordinates: 47.7155°N 12.0598°E

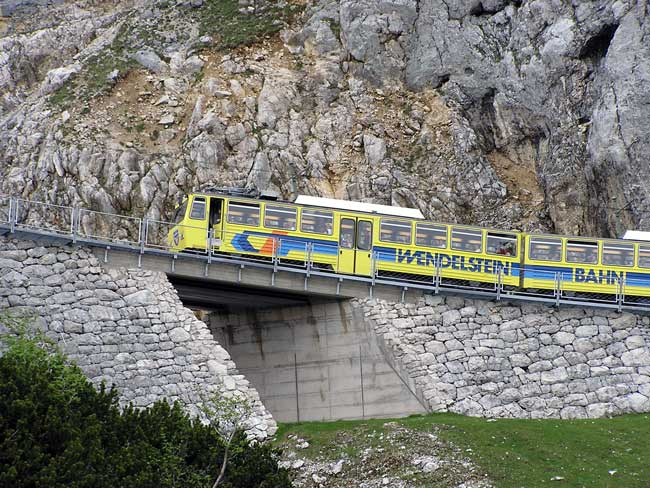
- The Wendelstein Railway passing the "Hohe Mauer" ("High Wall")

Overview
- Line number: 9570

Service
- Route number: 11030

Technical
- Line length: Combined total: 7.66 km (4.76 mi), with rack: 6.15 km (3.82 mi)
- Rack system: Strub
- Track gauge: 1,000 mm (3 ft 3 3/8 in) metre gauge
- Minimum radius: 40 m (131.2 ft)
- Electrification: Catenary; 1500 V DC
- Maximum incline: Adhesion (?) % Rack rail 23.7 %

The Wendelstein Rack Railway (German: Wendelsteinbahn), sometimes just referred to as the Wendelstein Railway, is an electrically-driven metre gauge rack railway (with several adhesion sections) that runs up the Wendelstein in the Upper Bavarian Limestone Alps. Together with the Wendelstein Cable Car (Wendelstein-Seilbahn) it is operated by the Wendelsteinbahn GmbH. The mountain railway climbs through a total height of 1,217.27 metres (3,993.7 feet). The Wendelstein Railway is one of only four working rack railways in Germany, the others being the Bavarian Zugspitze Railway, the Drachenfels Railway and the Stuttgart Rack Railway. It is also the second-highest railway in Germany, after the Zugspitze Railway, but the highest when considering only open-air railways.

== Conception ==
The construction of the Wendelstein Railway was the vision of privy councillor (Geheimer Kommerzienrat), Dr. h.c. Otto von Steinbeis, an industrialist, who was involved in forestry and agriculture in the alpine foreland as well as logging in Bosnia on a grand scale and built, in parallel with that, an extensive light railway (Kleinbahn) network. In 1908 he published his plans and on 4 February 1910 Prince-Regent Luitpold signed the concession deed for the construction of the Wendelstein Rack Railway.

The original 9.95-kilometre (6.18-mile) long route, running from Brannenburg over the eastern flank of the mountain, has seven tunnels, eight galleries and twelve bridges. In order to keep services running even in winter a route along the steep rock faces of the Wildalpjoch and the Soin was chosen instead of the cheaper and easier route on the slopes of the Mitteralm and Reindleralm alpine meadows.

== Construction ==
Construction began on 29 March 1910 after a certain amount of opposition and various difficulties had been overcome. The cost of construction came to about three million gold marks, which was entirely borne by von Steinbeis.

Over the two years that the line took to build, around 800 workers were employed, predominantly from Bosnia and Hercegovina and Italy. The task was demanding. For the so-called Hohe Mauer ("High Wall") alone, a 127-metre (417 ft) long, 17-metre (56 ft) high embankment was built just before the mountain station, requiring 10,000 cubic metres (13,080 cubic yards) of rock to be removed. A total of 35 tonnes (77,000 lb) of explosive were used.

The first train worked the line on 12 May 1912 and, on 25 May, the railways was formally opened. The Wendelstein Rack Railway is thus the oldest, working rack railway in Bavaria.

== Operation ==
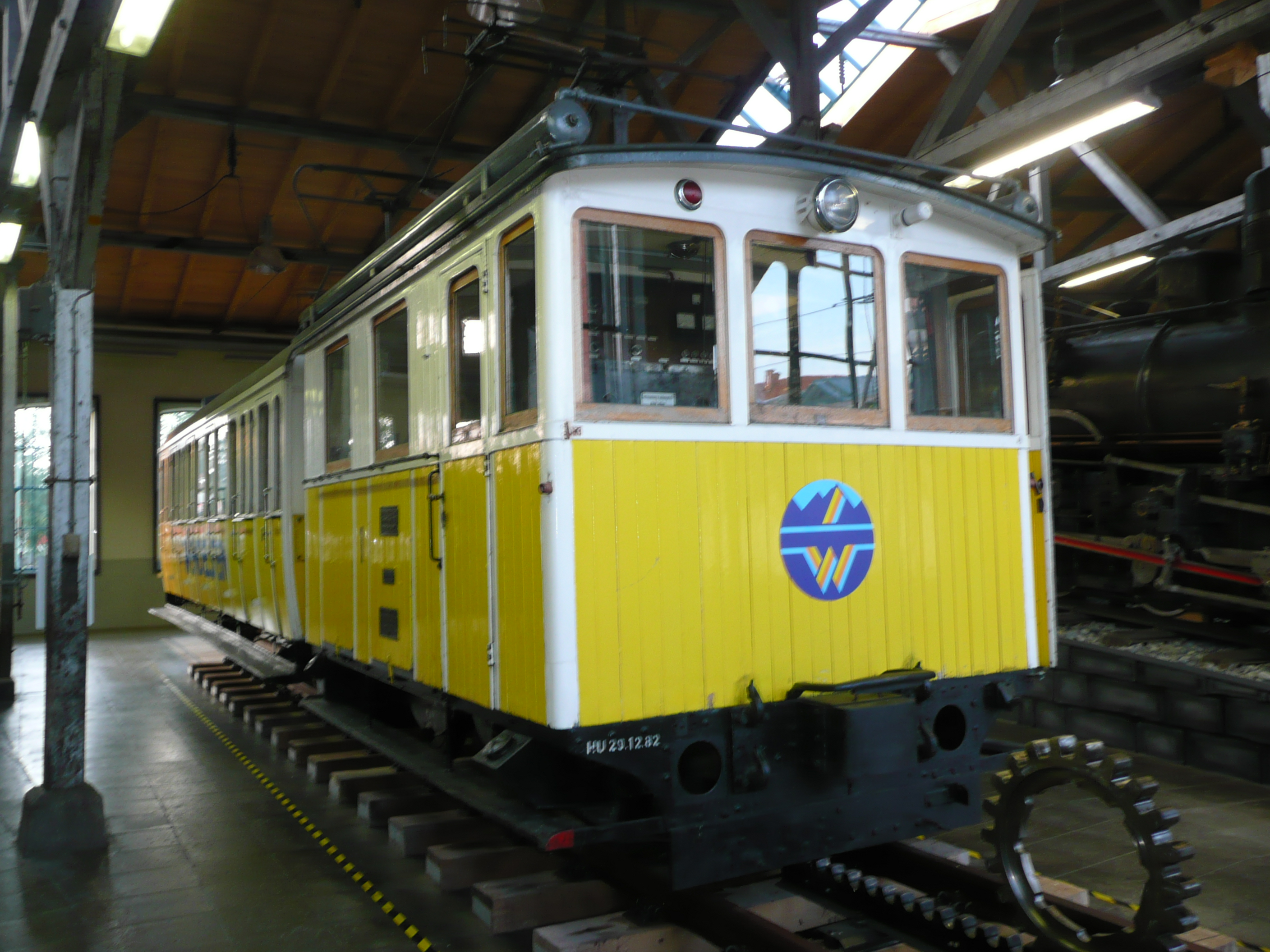
Loco No. 1 with trailer car 3 in Lokwelt Freilassing

The full journey on the original route took 75 minutes. In 1961, as a result of the growth in private car ownership, the section between Brannenburg station and the present valley station in the village of Waching was sacrificed because it crossed the federal road. At the same time the railway lost its connexion to the Deutsche Bundesbahn network. As a result, the length of the line was reduced to 7.66 km (4.76 mi) and journey times to 55 minutes.

In the years that followed it became clear that the line could not be operated profitably. As a result, in 1970, the Wendelstein Cable Car was erected running from Bayrischzell-Osterhofen to the Wendelstein summit, with the intent that it would replace the rack railway in due course. The attraction of the rack railway for tourism was however recognised and it was kept going.

In 1987, with help from the Free State of Bavaria, the local parishes, the district of Rosenheim and the parent company of Lechwerke, the line was modernised at a cost of 17 million deutschmarks. On conclusion of the work in 1991 the capacity of the line increased by almost 100%. Journey times were reduced to 25 minutes uphill and 35 minutes downhill, thanks to two modern double railcars. The trains are able to operate every half an hour. Today 20 employees work on the rack railway, but it is still reliant on equalization payments.

== Gallery ==
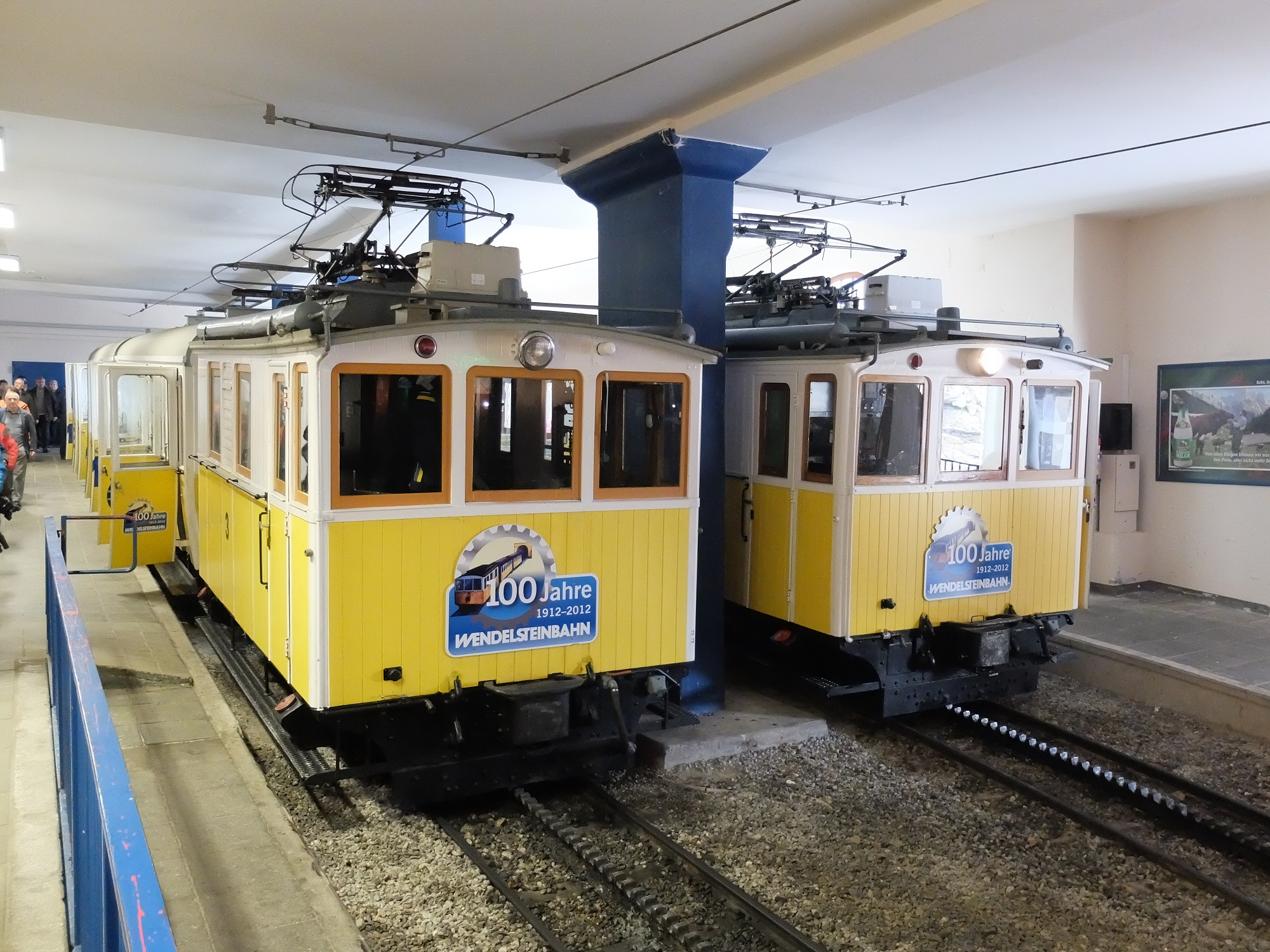
Lok 2 und 3 in mountain station

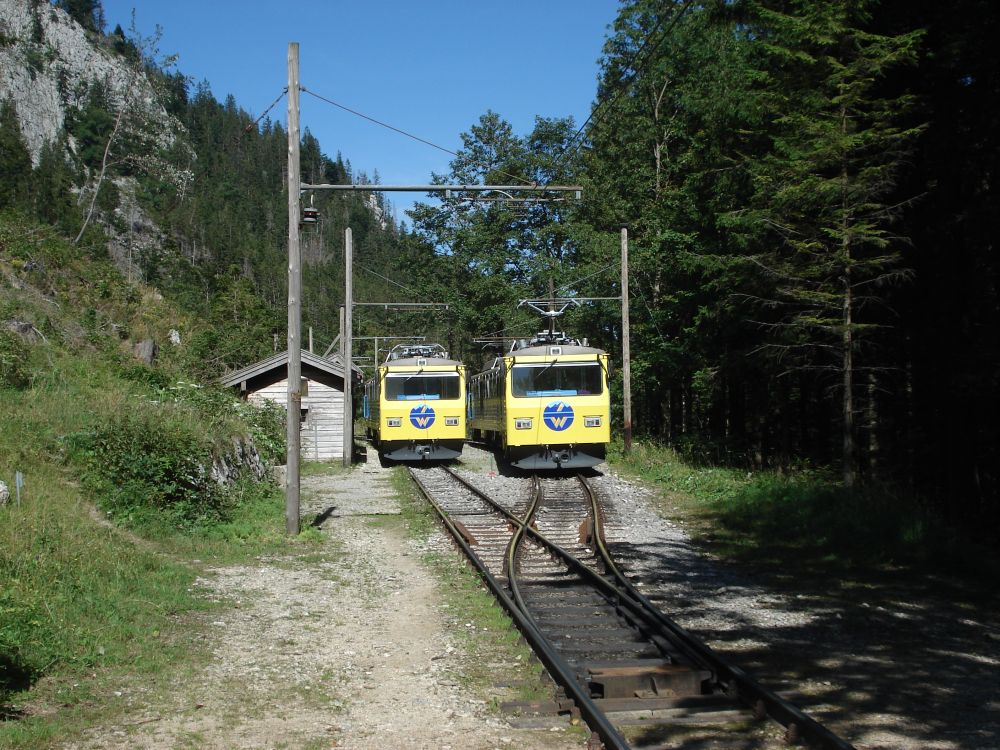
Two trains crossing in Aipl station

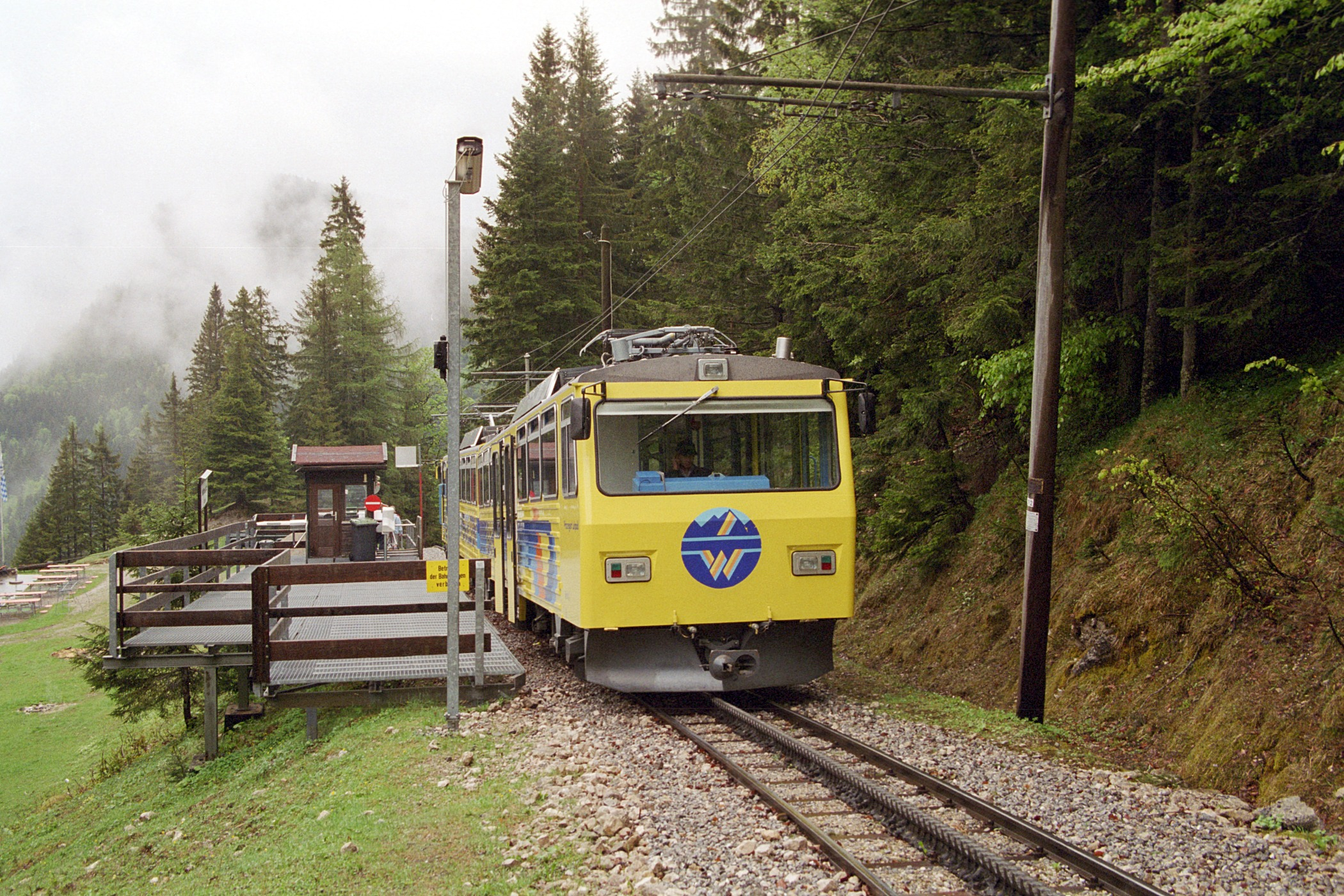
Mitteralm halt (Mitteralm stop)

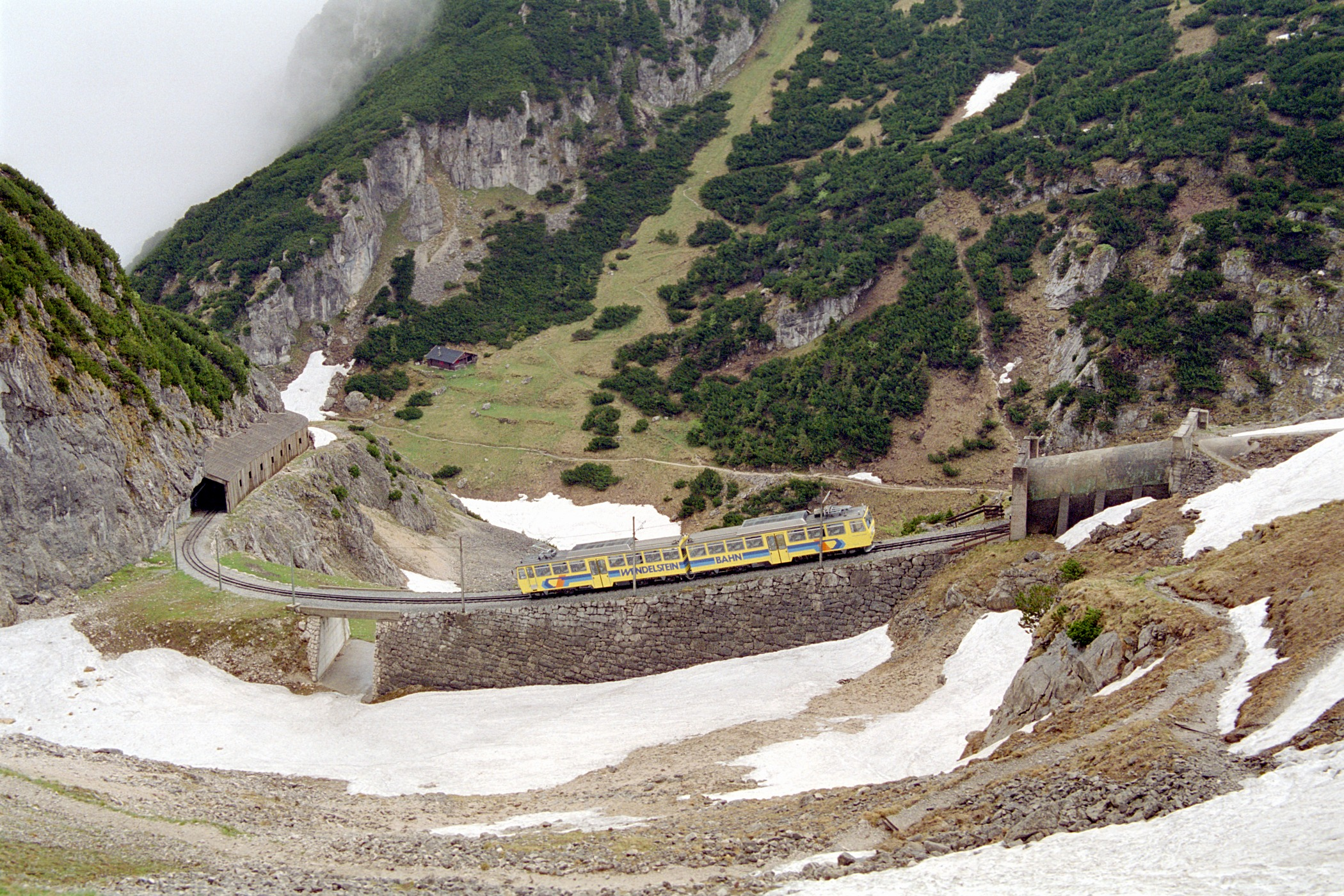
On the Hohe Mauer

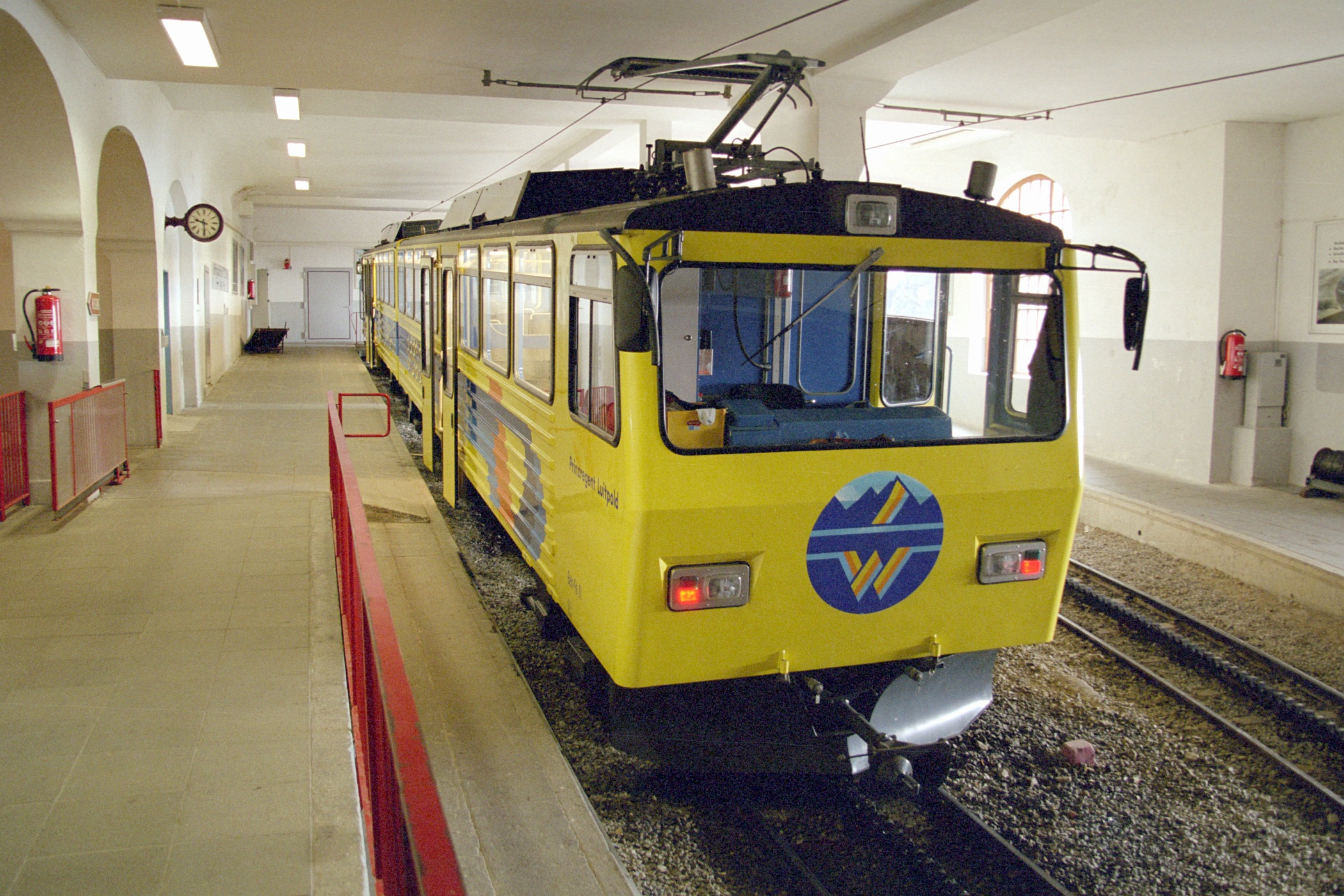
Wendelsteinhaus mountain station

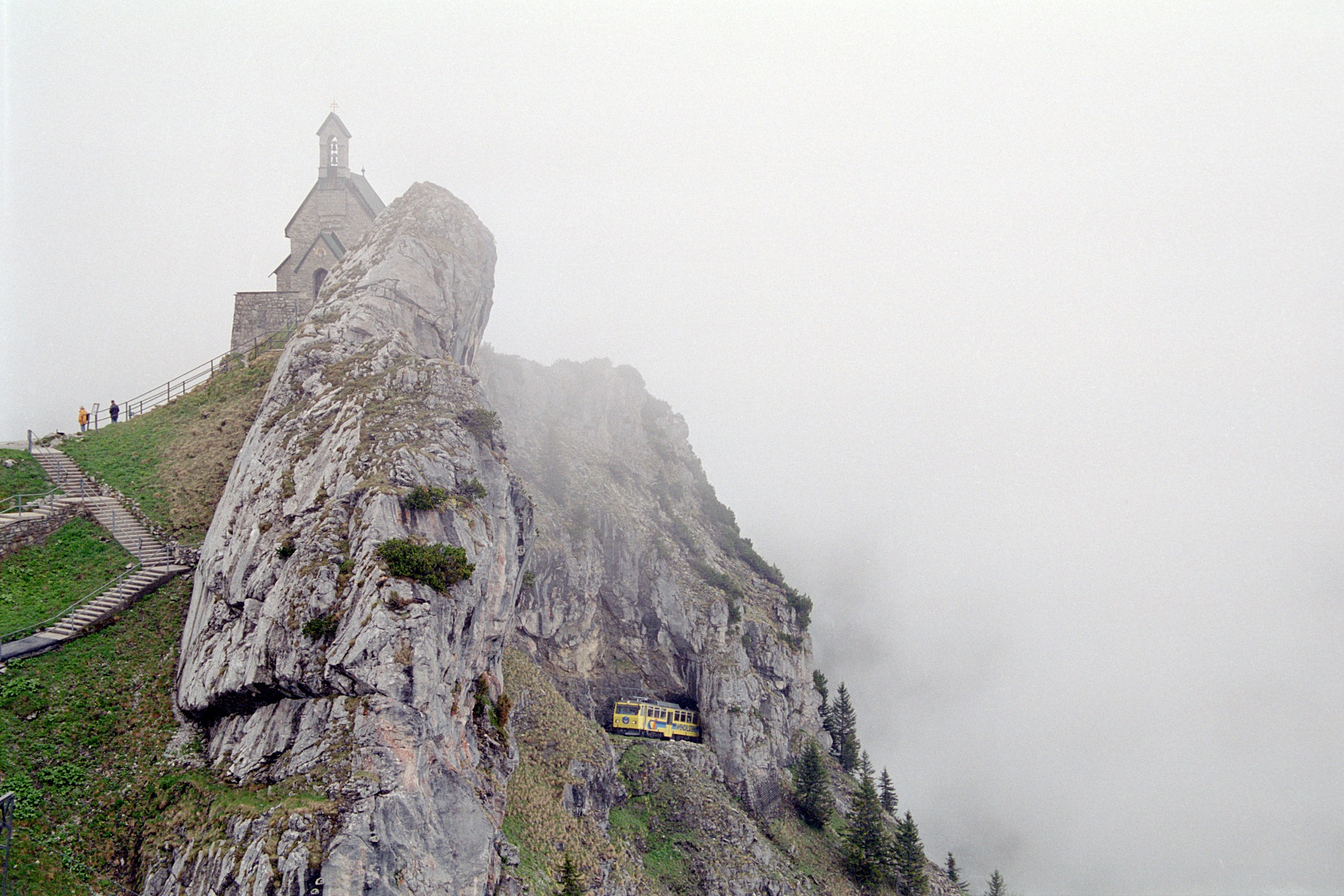
Between the final two tunnels
