= Soin =

Soin may refer to:

- Nishiyama Sōin (1605—1682), a haikai-no-renga poet
- Roshni Kaur Soin (born 1982), Singaporean-Indian model
- Sergei Soin (born 1982), Russian ice hockey player
- Soin (mountain), a mountain in Bavaria, Germany
- Solln, a neighborhood in Munich, Germany, also known as Soin
- Westerners (Korean political faction), romanized as Sŏin using McCune–Reischauer romanization
