= Wendelstein (mountain) =

Mountain in Germany

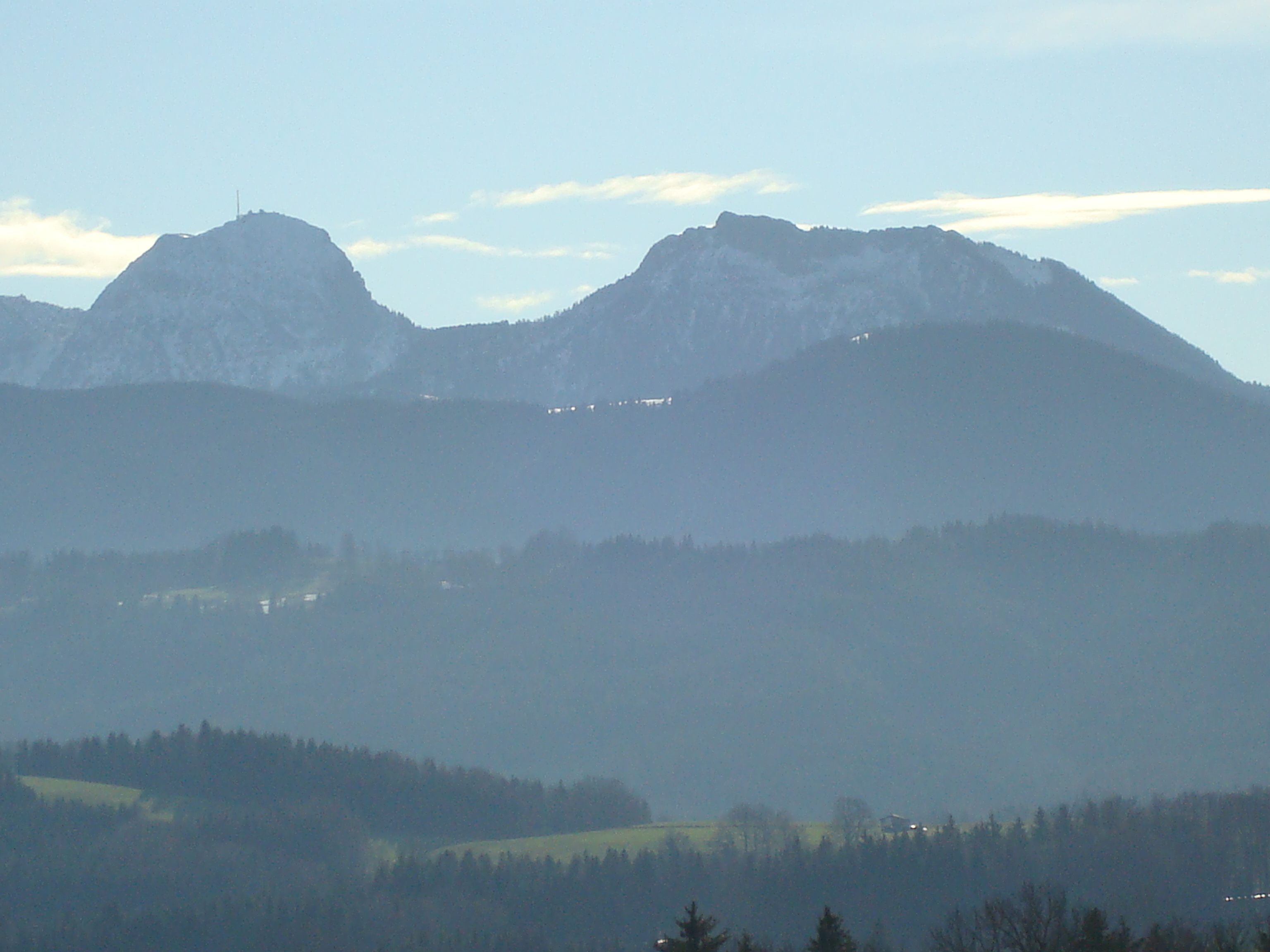
- The Wendelstein (l) from the north. To its right is the Breitenstein.

Highest point
- Elevation: 1,838 m (6,030 ft)
- Coordinates: 47°42′10″N 12°00′44″E

Geography
- Location within Bavaria
- Location: Bavaria, Germany
- Parent range: Mangfall Mountains, Bavarian Pre-Alps

Geology
- Rock age: Triassic
- Mountain type: Wetterstein limestone

Climbing
- First ascent: unknown
- Access: rack railway; cable car; weather station; observatory; transmission site; wind generator site; church

Wendelstein (German pronunciation: [ˈvɛndl̩ˌʃtaɪn]) is a 1,838-metre-high (6,030 ft) mountain in the Bavarian Alps in South Germany. It is part of the Mangfall Mountains, the eastern part of the Bavarian Pre-Alps, and is the highest peak in the Wendelstein massif. It lies between the valleys of the Leitzach and Inn and is accessible via the Wendelstein Cable Car and the Wendelstein Rack Railway. On its northern foothills rises the Jenbach, which becomes the Kalten on its way to the River Mangfall. Local valley settlements include Bayrischzell, Brannenburg and Osterhofen.

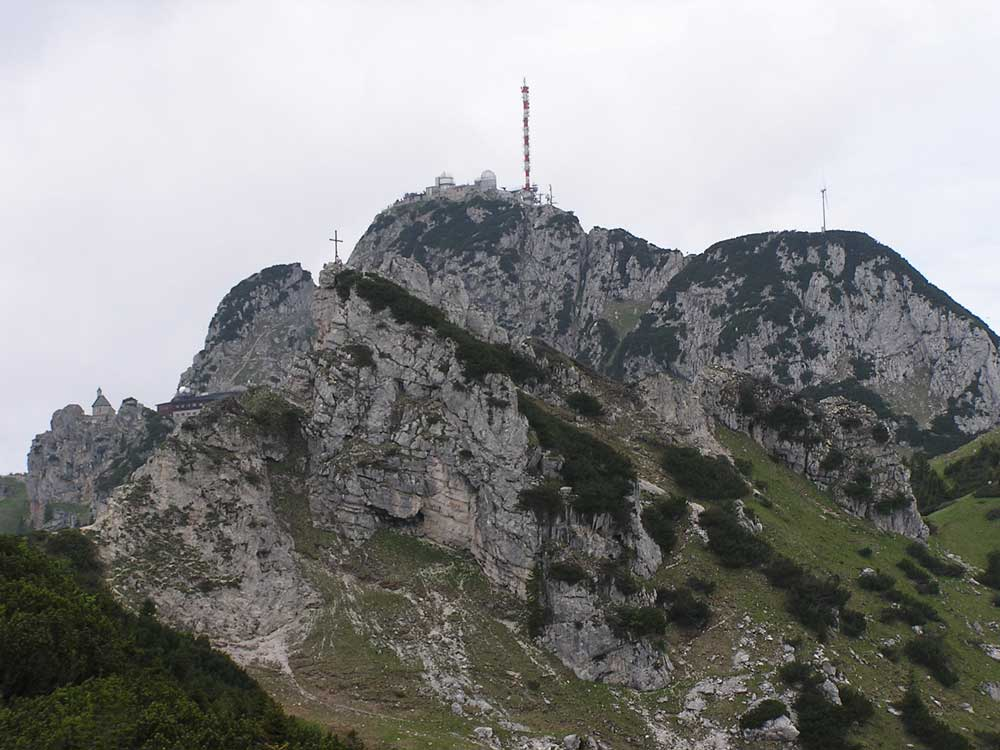
The Wendelstein from the southeast. Foreground: the Kesselwand and summit cross. Between the Kesselwand and the Wendelstein is the Reindler-Kessel at about 1600 m, through which the railway runs. The Kesselwand and Wendelstein are not a single massif

== Geography ==
=== Geology ===
The mountain consists mainly of Wetterstein limestone from the Upper Triassic with dasycladales - marine algae whose natural habitat is shallow lagoons in tropical climates. The colour of the rock varies between grey white and light grey to speckled.

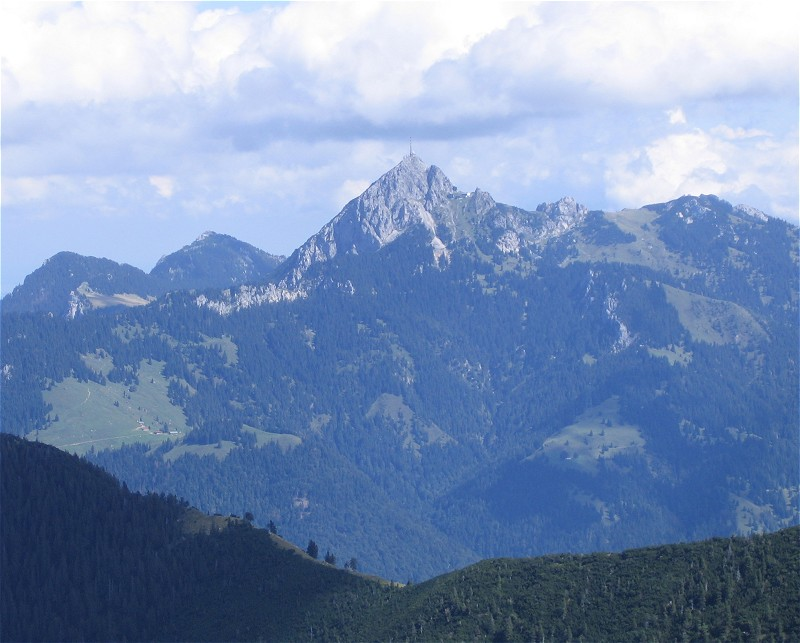
The Wendelstein seen from the west

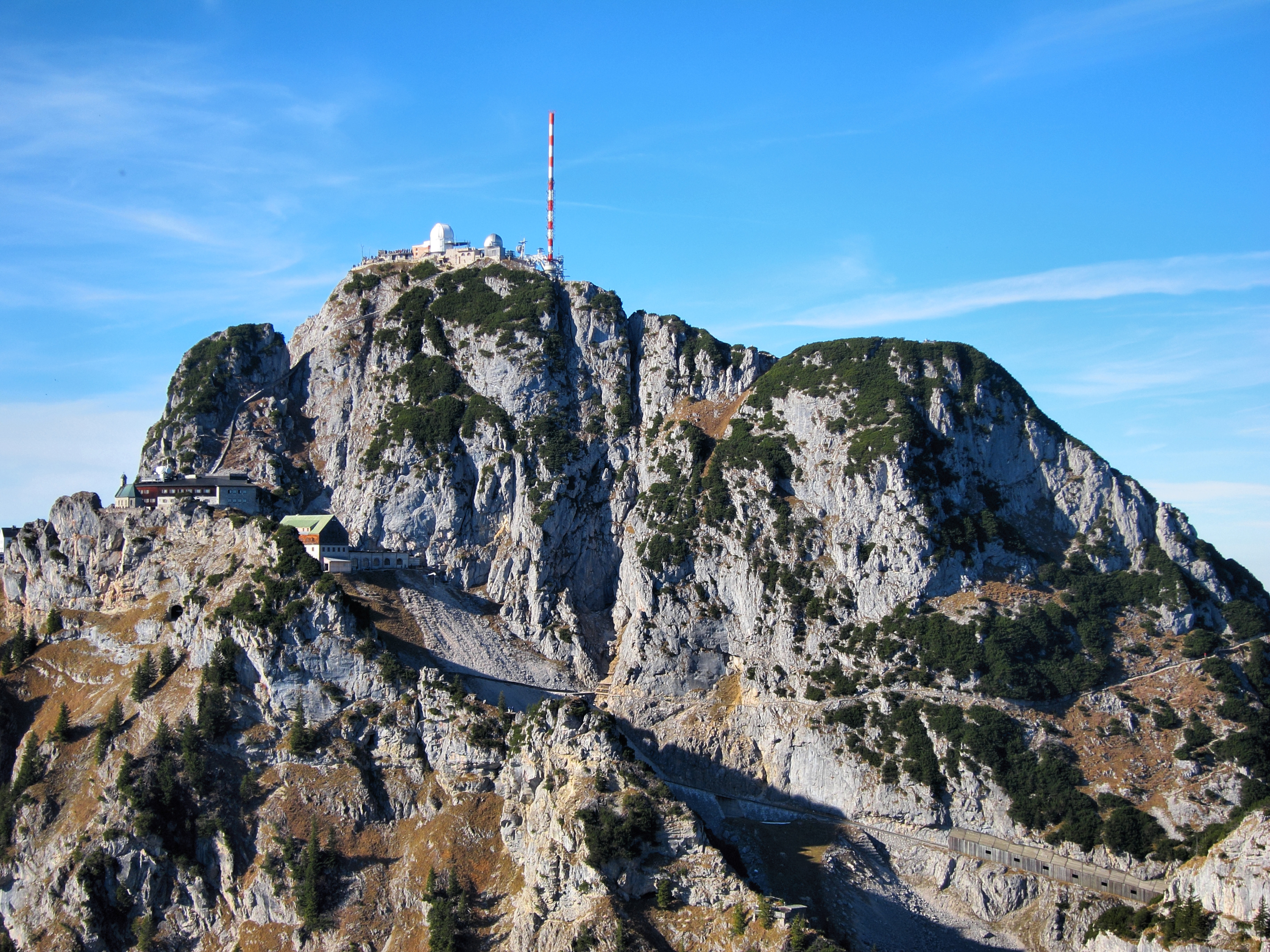
The Wendelstein from the south

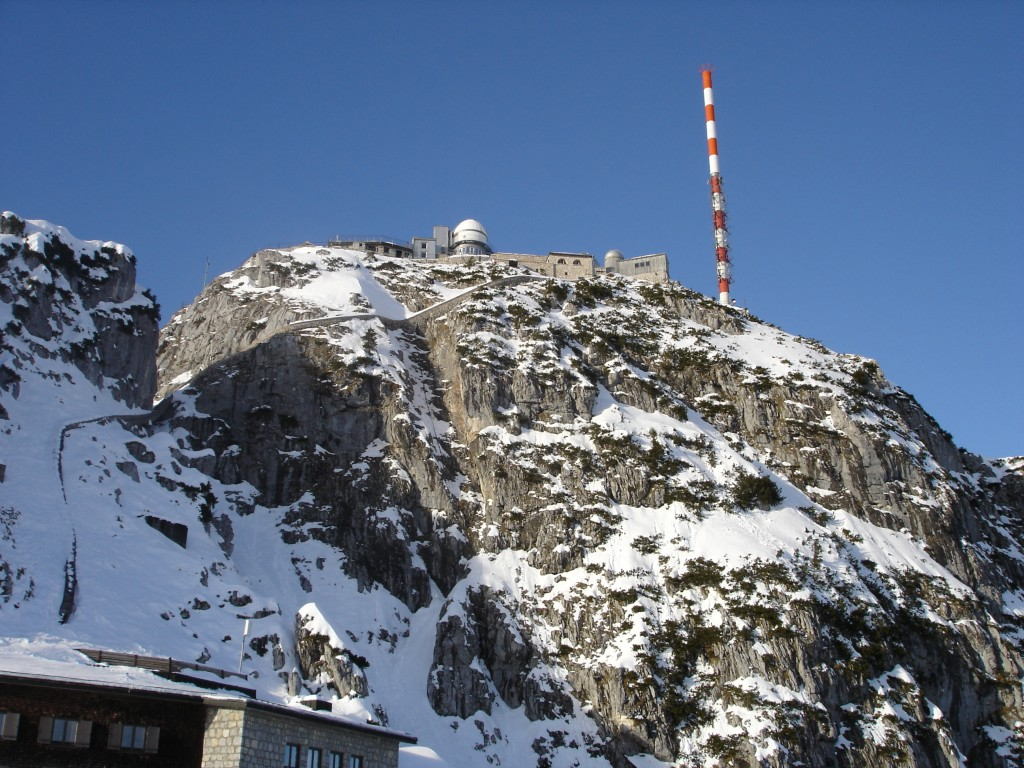
Wendelstein's BR transmission mast

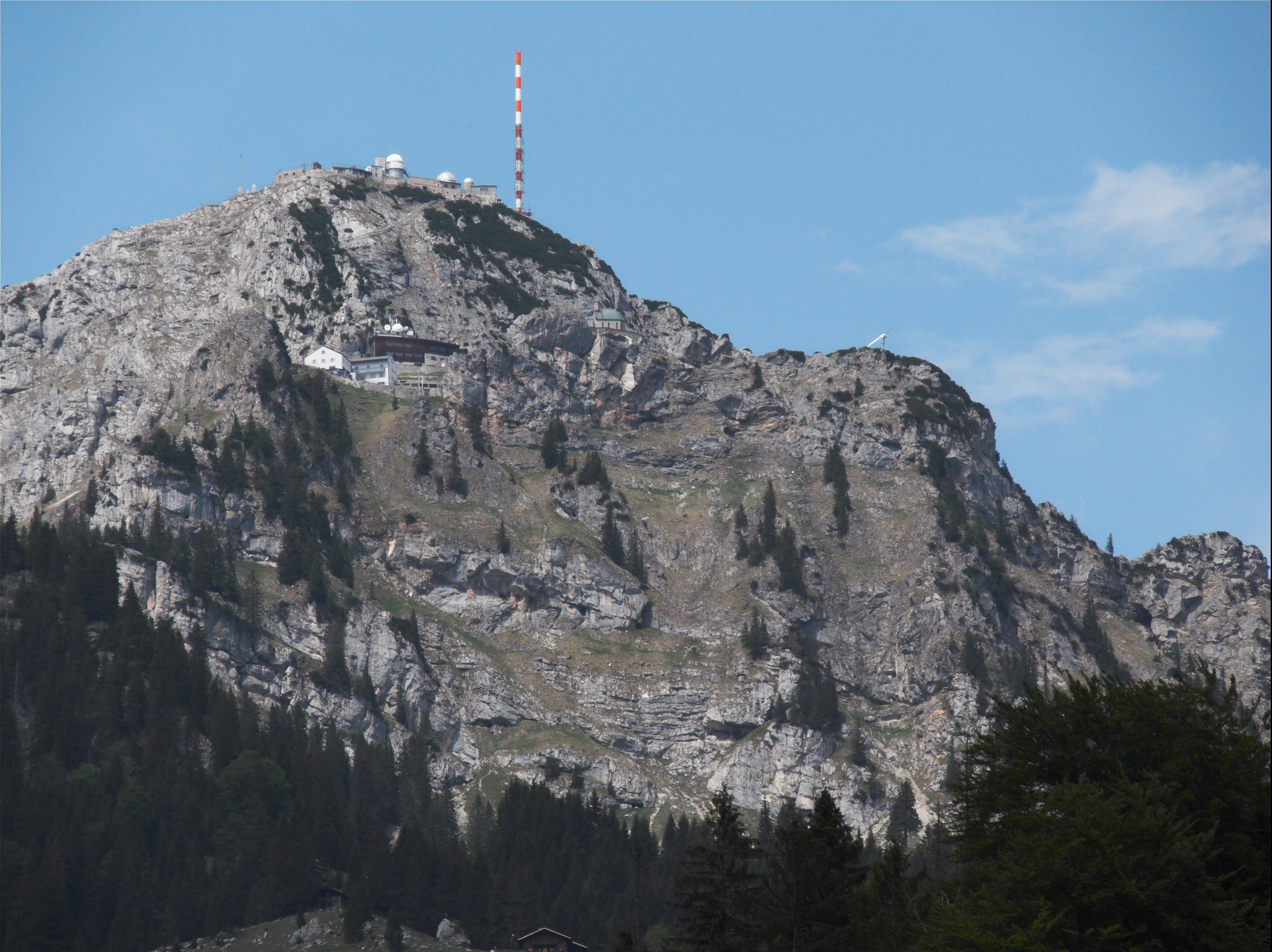
View from Bayrischzell of the summit

== Climate ==
Precipitation chart

The annual precipitation is 1,714 mm (67.5 in), which is extremely high, lying in the upper twentieth of values in Germany. 99% of German Met Office weather stations register lower values. The driest month is October, the wettest is July, which experiences 2.6 times as much precipitation as October. Annual variations are extremely large. Only 3% of weather stations register higher annual variations.

Climate data for Wendelstein: 1832m (1991–2020 normals, extremes 1951–2012)
Month	Jan	Feb	Mar	Apr	May	Jun	Jul	Aug	Sep	Oct	Nov	Dec	Year
Record high °C (°F)	12.0 (53.6)	14.3 (57.7)	14.4 (57.9)	18.1 (64.6)	21.8 (71.2)	24.3 (75.7)	26.2 (79.2)	25.5 (77.9)	24.6 (76.3)	19.8 (67.6)	16.0 (60.8)	12.7 (54.9)	26.2 (79.2)
Mean daily maximum °C (°F)	−0.5 (31.1)	−1.3 (29.7)	0.7 (33.3)	4.1 (39.4)	9.2 (48.6)	12.2 (54.0)	14.0 (57.2)	14.3 (57.7)	10.4 (50.7)	7.8 (46.0)	2.9 (37.2)	−0.2 (31.6)	6.2 (43.2)
Daily mean °C (°F)	−3.6 (25.5)	−4.4 (24.1)	−2.4 (27.7)	0.8 (33.4)	5.7 (42.3)	8.6 (47.5)	10.4 (50.7)	10.8 (51.4)	7.2 (45.0)	4.5 (40.1)	−0.1 (31.8)	−3.2 (26.2)	2.9 (37.2)
Mean daily minimum °C (°F)	−6.2 (20.8)	−7.0 (19.4)	−5.0 (23.0)	−1.8 (28.8)	2.9 (37.2)	5.6 (42.1)	7.4 (45.3)	8.1 (46.6)	4.7 (40.5)	1.8 (35.2)	−2.7 (27.1)	−5.8 (21.6)	0.2 (32.4)
Record low °C (°F)	−27.8 (−18.0)	−29.1 (−20.4)	−23.6 (−10.5)	−15.9 (3.4)	−10.1 (13.8)	−4.7 (23.5)	−1.6 (29.1)	−2.5 (27.5)	−5.7 (21.7)	−12.2 (10.0)	−18.0 (−0.4)	−24.7 (−12.5)	−29.1 (−20.4)
Average precipitation mm (inches)	123.3 (4.85)	143.5 (5.65)	178.9 (7.04)	117.7 (4.63)	129.8 (5.11)	183.2 (7.21)	185.5 (7.30)	176.5 (6.95)	127.1 (5.00)	92.0 (3.62)	135.0 (5.31)	139.6 (5.50)	1,729.5 (68.09)
Average precipitation days (≥ 1.0 mm)	15.3	15.6	19.1	16.6	18.2	19.9	18.7	16.9	15.6	14.3	15.0	17.6	202.4
Average snowy days (≥ 1 cm)	30.8	28.2	30.8	27.6	11.4	1.8	0.4	0.3	3.2	10.4	21.8	29.9	196.7
Average relative humidity (%)	67.2	71.4	77.0	76.7	77.7	79.8	79.9	78.3	79.2	71.5	72.7	71.7	75.3
Mean monthly sunshine hours	120.6	117.2	133.9	154.2	179.1	167.8	186.2	194.0	152.8	154.0	106.4	97.4	1,775.4
Source 1: World Meteorological Organisation
Source 2: DWD (extremes)

== Development ==
On the summit of the mountain is the Wendelstein Chapel, an observatory, a weather station, a geopark and a transmission mast for the Bayerischer Rundfunk. About a hundred metres below the summit, on the ridge between the Wendelstein and the Schwaigerwand, lie the mountain inn, the termini of the rack railway and cable car, the service building for the mast, the former mountain hotel (above the station), a hut for the mountain rescue service and the Wendelstein Church. The buildings around the mountain stations are linked to the summit by a metalled track, which also enables the summit to be reached by inexperienced hikers. Because the path cannot be used in winter, there is also a lift in the middle of the mountain for employees of the observatory, weather service and transmission site, accessed from the station of the rack railway through a tunnel.

The rack railway was built in 1912 by Otto von Steinbeis. Since its renovation in the early 1990s, it has been worked by modern railcars that have reduced journey times from over 50 minutes to about half an hour. Near the rack railway mountain station is the Wendelstein Cave with several stalactites and stalagmites, and which contain ice until well into the summer months.

== Wendelstein Church ==
The foundation stone of the Wendelstein Church (Wendelsteinkircherl) was laid on 1 July 1889 on a rocky ridge a hundred metres below the summit. On 20 August 1890 Germany's highest church was consecrated. It is dedicated to the Patrona Bavariae and is managed by the Archdiocese of Munich and Freising as a satellite church of the parish of Maria Himmelfahrt in Brannenburg. The Wendelstein Church's description as the "highest church in Germany" is indisputable; all other higher church buildings (such as the Zugspitze Chapel consecrated in 1981) are not churches in the ecclesiastical sense, but only chapels. Regular masses and marriage services take place in the mountain church in summer.

Wendelstein Church is also often called the Wendelstein Chapel, but there is a separate Wendelstein Chapel. This is dedicated to St. Wendelin and stands just below the summit. This summit chapel, made of wood, is considerably older than the church; there are reports of it going back to the early 19th century.

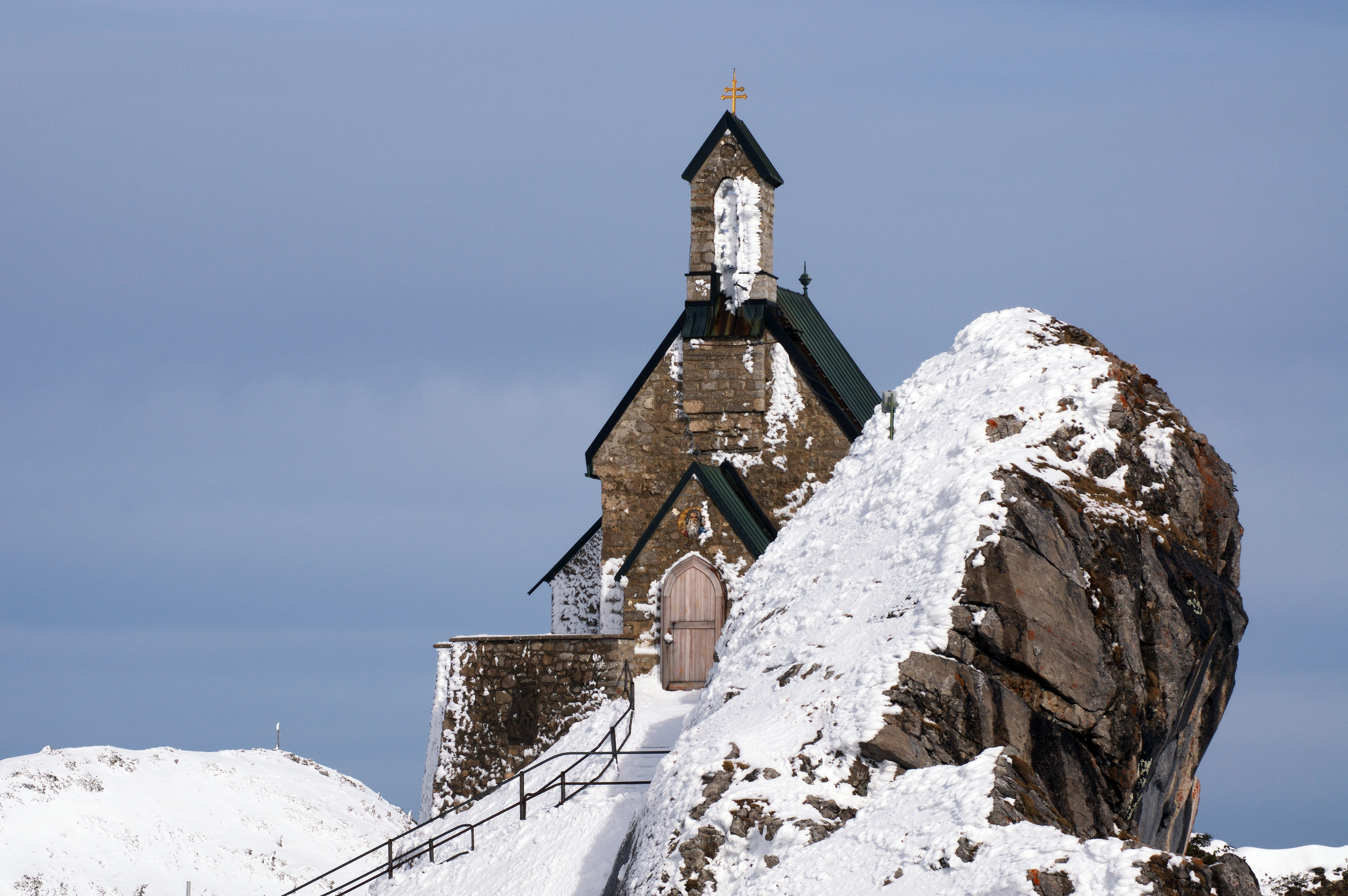
The Wendelstein Church

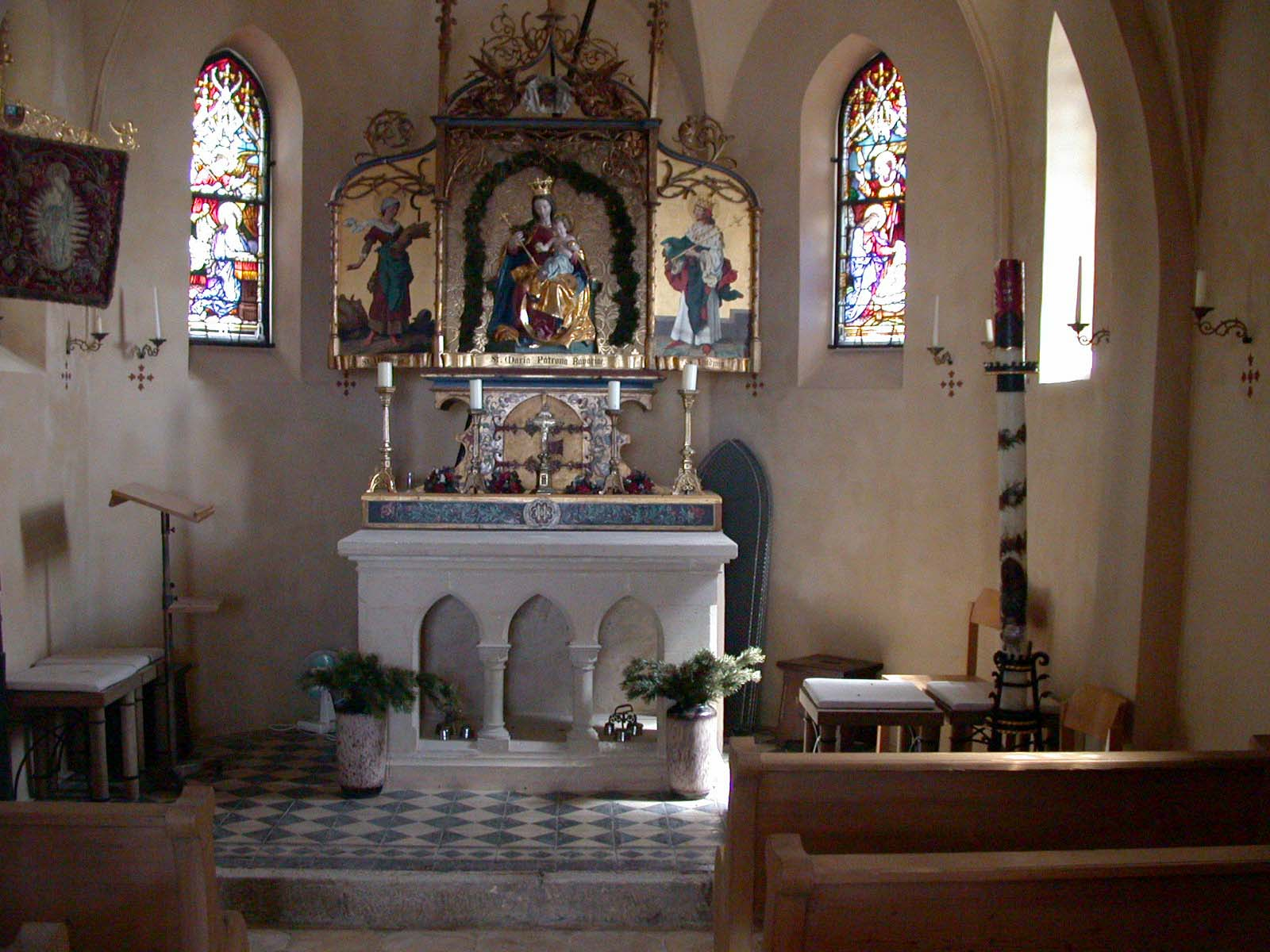
Interior

== Mountain weather station and observatory ==
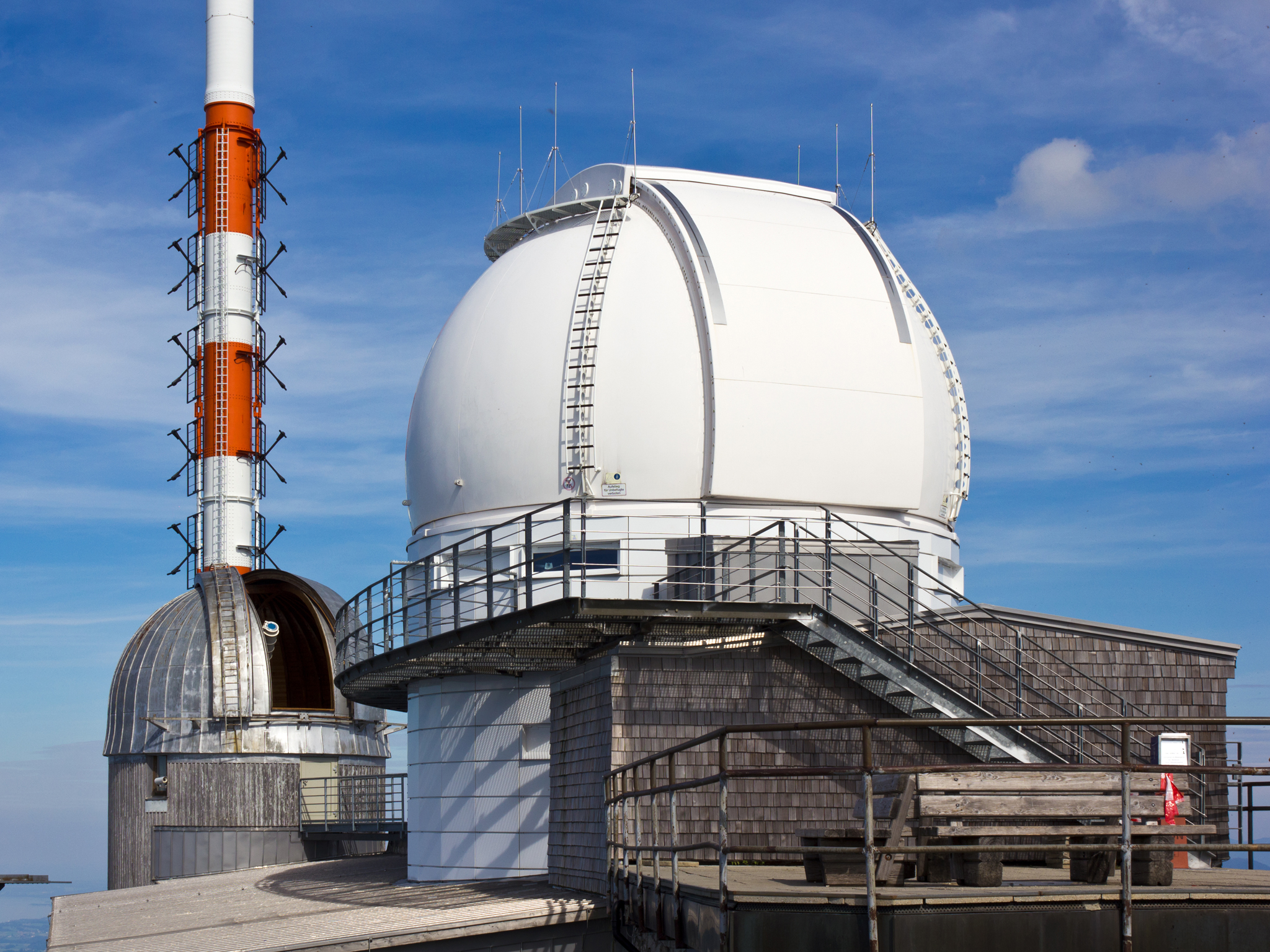
Wendelstein Observatory

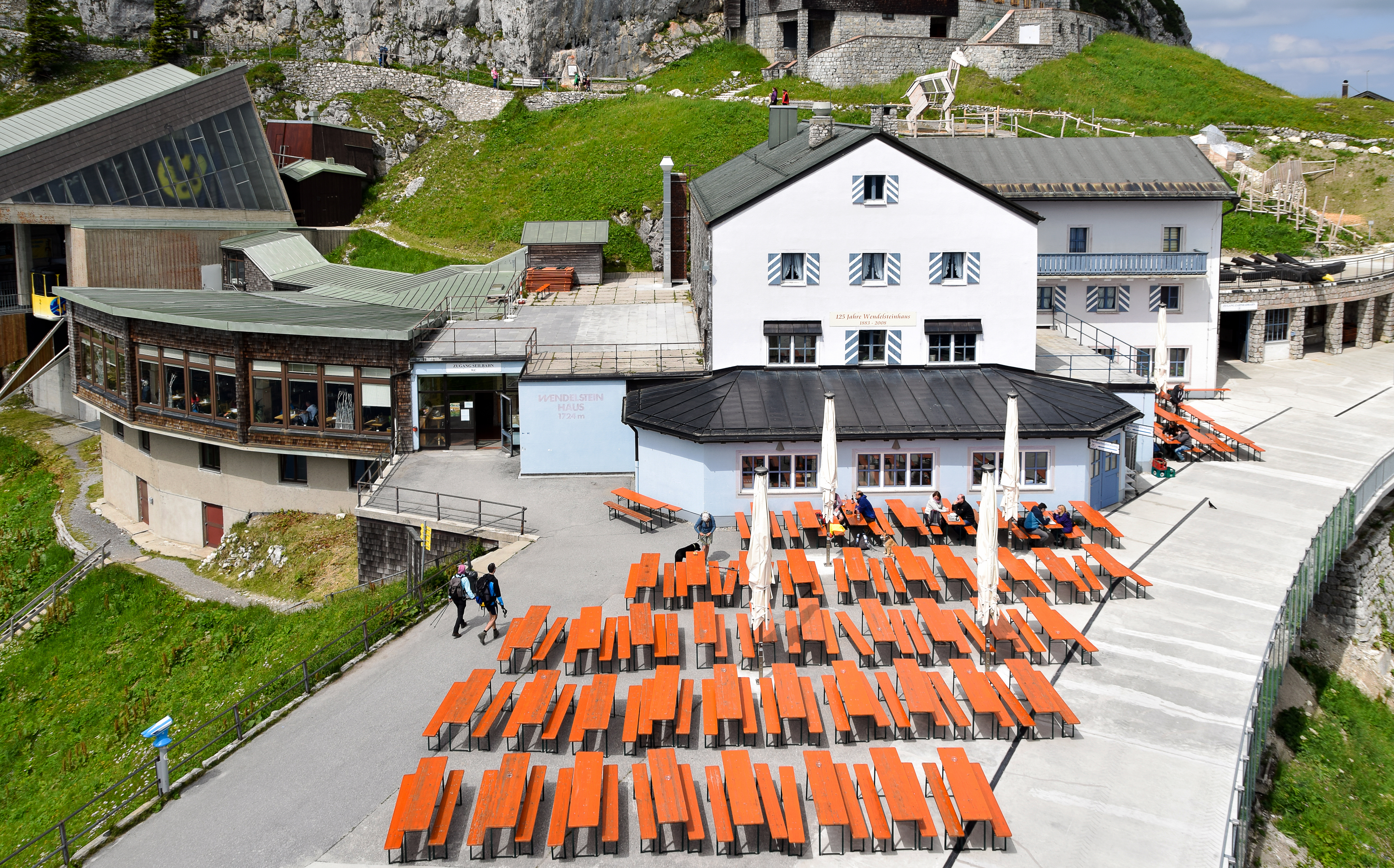
Wendelsteinhaus hut on the Wendelstein

On the summit of the Wendelstein there is a weather station belonging to the German Meteorological Office, which is staffed around the clock, and an observatory of the Institute for Astronomy and Astrophysics at LMU Munich.

The first weather observations on the Wendelstein were recorded in a makeshift observatory erected by the summit chapel by Paul Schiegg in July 1804; however, the records were often frustrated by lightning, storms, snow, and rain. In 1883 the Wendelsteinhaus Meteorological Station was built by Dr. Fritz Erk of the Royal Bavarian Meteorological Central Station in Munich at an altitude of 1700 m. This was the first Alpine station in the Royal Bavarian Meteorological Station Network. The delivery of mail to and from this station was carried out in winter by the members of the Wendelsteinhaus Alpine Club and in summer by tourists. In 1962, the present weather station was built at the summit. It is staffed around the clock with full-time staff.

The observatory was founded in December 1939 by Karl-Otto Kiepenheuer as a solar observatory for the Luftwaffe. The recording of solar activity was supposed to enable the most accurate forecast possible of the optimal frequencies used for military communications. After the Second World War, the observatory was funded by the US forces for the same purpose. Since 1949 the facility has belonged to LMU Munich. In the 1960s the observatory was enhanced with a coronagraph, a device that enabled research to be carried out on the atmosphere of the Sun. Due to increasing air pollution and research priorities switching back to night-time astronomy, scientific observations of the Sun ceased in the 1980s. Since 1988 the facility has become purely an observatory; the dome of the coronagraph is only used today for viewing purposes. Searches were conducted from the Wendelstein for extrasolar planets by evaluating occultations and research is carried out on variable stars in dwarf galaxies using an 80-centimetre telescope and CCD cameras. In 2012, the 80-centimetre telescope was replaced by an instrument with a two-metre aperture.

In addition, from 1950 to 1960 there was an observatory on the eastern summit of the Wendelstein, consisting of an observation dome and a residential house. There, the astronomer Rudolf Kühn carried out research. The facility was completely demolished in 1965, only the remains of the foundations are still visible. Where the observation dome once stood, a wind turbine was later built, but that, too, was dismantled in 2007.

== Ski area ==
The rack railway and gondola lift and two drag lifts serve a small ski area on the Wendelstein. Plans to link it to the Sudelfeld ski area were discarded. Because of a dispute with an alpine farmer, there was no skiing on the Wendelstein from 1995 to 1997. In spite of numerous explosions and other construction projects in the past 40 years, most of the runs on the Wendelstein are steep rugged slopes that are only suitable for experienced skiers. Throughout the year members of the Brannenburg Mountain Rescue Service are on duty at the Klausen Hut (opposite the Wendelstein Church) and in the ski area.
