= Wendelstein Cable Car =

Coordinates: 47.697°N 11.999°E

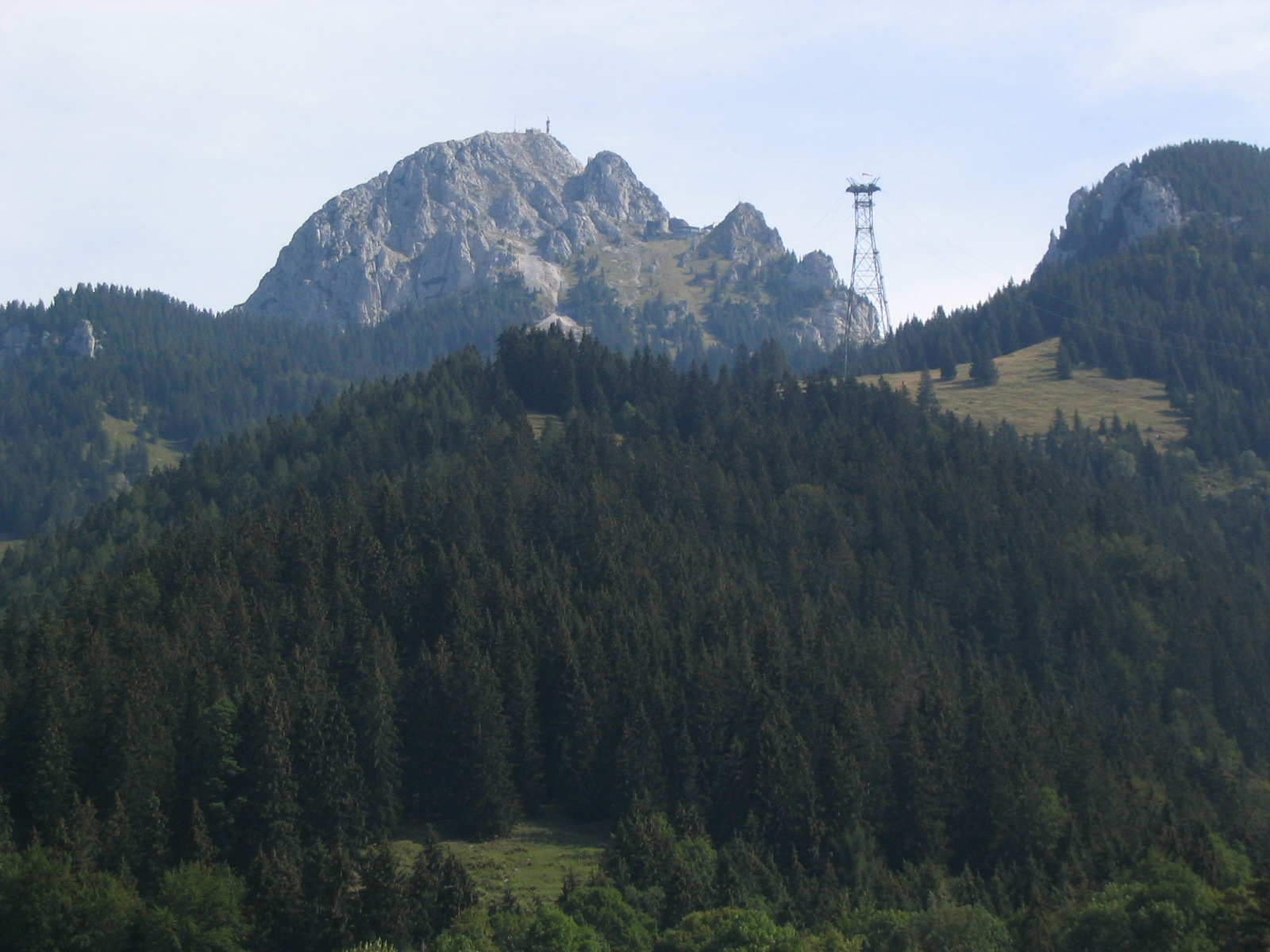
Cable car pylon, 27 August 2003

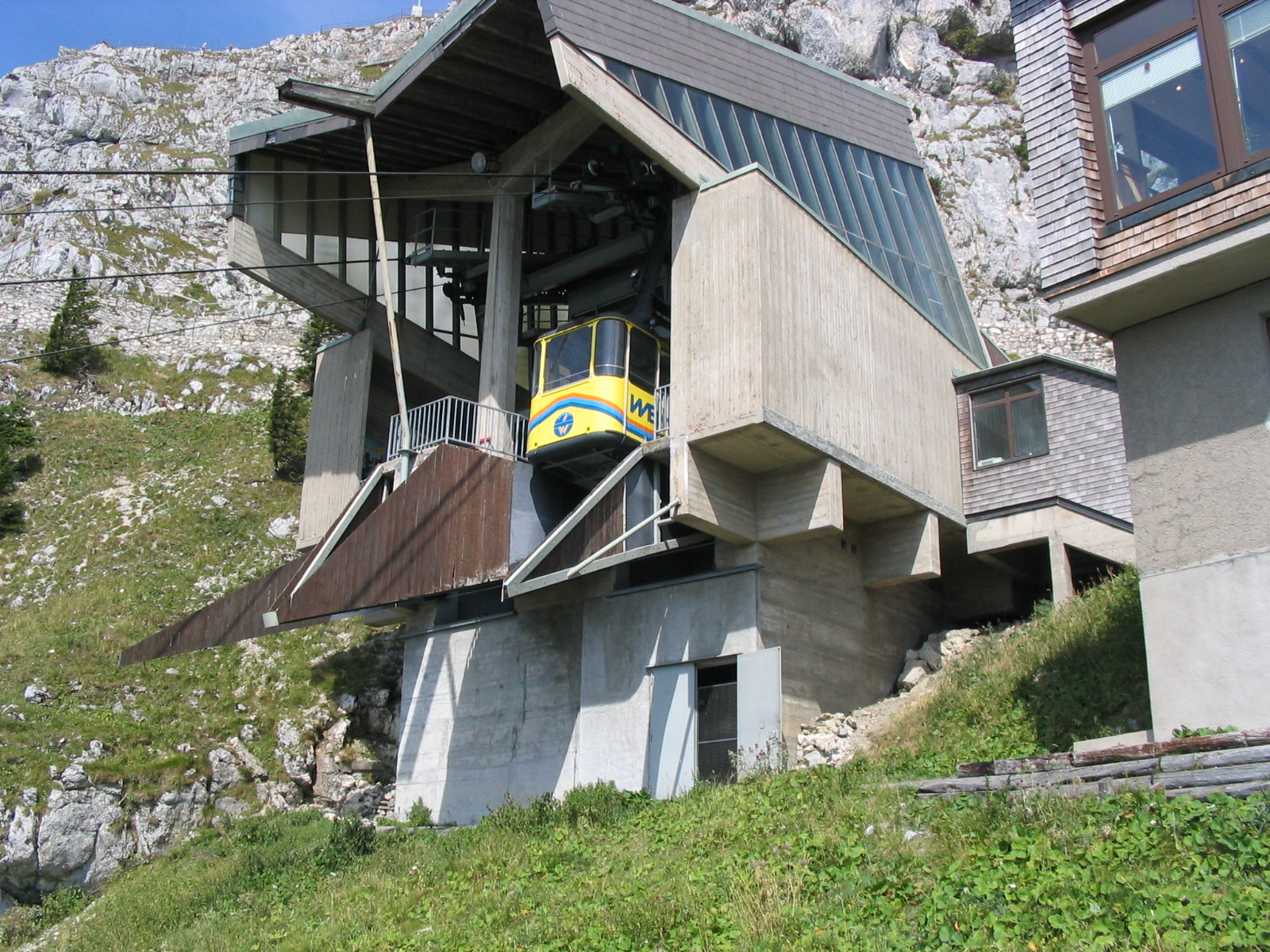
Cable car to the Wendelstein, top station, 25 August 2003

The Wendelstein Cable Car (Wendelstein-Seilbahn) is a 2,953-metre (9,688-foot) long cable car (US: aerial tramway) running from the village of Bayrischzell Osterhofen to Mount Wendelstein in the Bavarian Alps in Germany. It has a maximum speed of 10 m/s (32.8 ft/s) (36 km/h or 22.4 mph) and its travel time is 6.5 minutes. The cabins each take up to 50 passengers, and the cable car system has a transport capacity of 450 people per hour. The cable car climbs an altitude difference of 932 metres (3,058 feet).

The cable car has a 50 mm (1.97 in) track rope and a 30 mm (1.18 in) haulage rope. Its engine has a maximum output of 490 hp (370 kW). It has one 75-metre (246-foot) tall pylon.

== See also ==
- Wendelstein Rack Railway, which takes visitors to the summit from the other side of the mountain
