= Fischbachau =

- Municipality
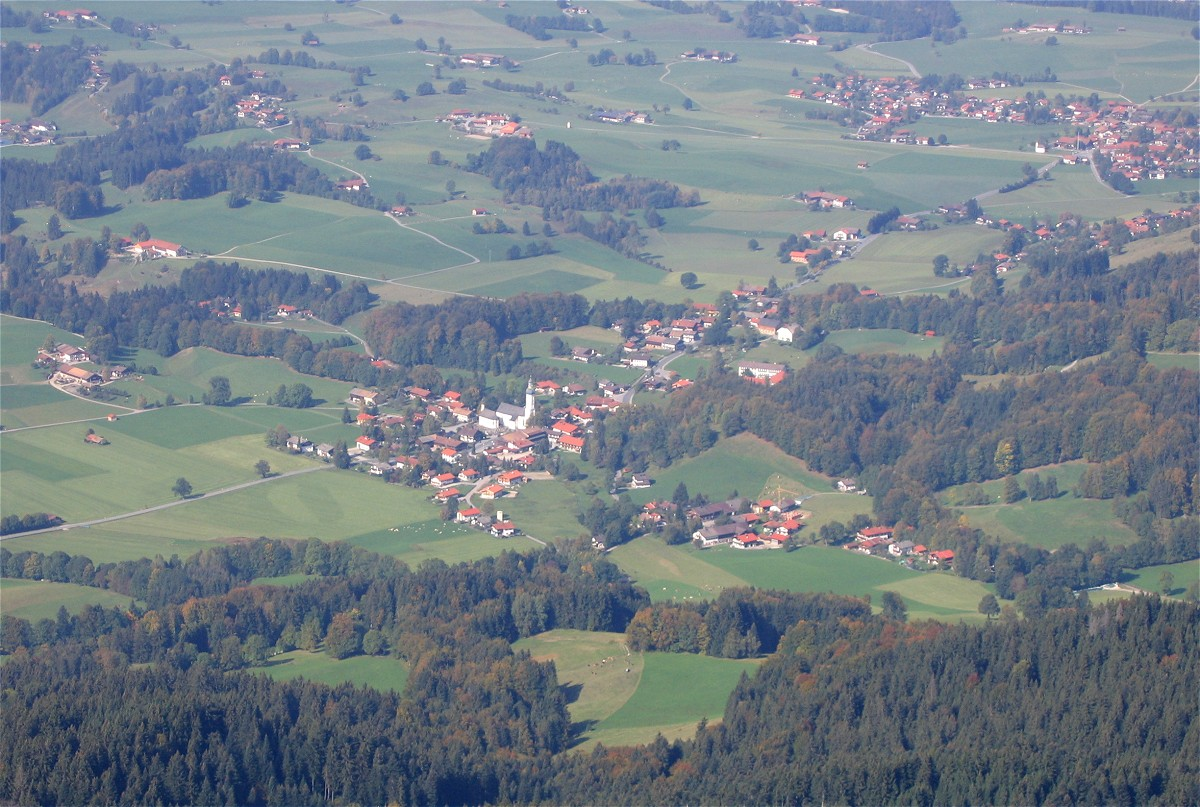
- Panorama

- Flag Coat of arms

- Location of Fischbachau within Miesbach district
- Interactive map of Fischbachau
- Location within Germany Location within Bavaria
- Coordinates: 47°43′N 11°57′E
- Country: Germany
- State: Bavaria
- Admin. region: Oberbayern
- District: Miesbach

Government
  - Mayor (2022–28): Stefan Deingruber (CSU)

Area
  - Total: 75.91 km^{2} (29.31 sq mi)
- Elevation: 771 m (2,530 ft)

Population (2025-12-31)
  - Total: 5,550
  - Density: 73.1/km^{2} (189/sq mi)
- Time zone: UTC+01:00 (CET)
  - Summer (DST): UTC+02:00 (CEST)
- Postal codes: 83730
- Dialling codes: 08028, 08025
- Vehicle registration: MB
- Website: www.fischbachau.de

Fischbachau is a municipality in the district of Miesbach in Bavaria in Germany.

== Geography ==
Fischbachau is located in the valley of the river Leitzach, on an Alluvial fan at the east edge of the Leitzachtals and at the foot of Breitenstein mountain. The town is located 9 miles away from Miesbach, 15 miles from Rosenheim, 19 miles from Kufstein and 37 miles from Munich, capital city of Bavaria.

== History ==
Fischbachau is mentioned for the first time in the Frisian Liber commutationum et traditionum around 1078-1080. From 1096 to 1100 the St. Martin abbey was constructed and in 1803 the Scheyern Abbey. In 1811 Fischbachau was turned into a formal municipality with a mayor. During World War II, a subcamp of the Dachau concentration camp was located here. In 1976 Hundham, Wörnsmühl, and in 1978 southern parts of a territory of the former municipality of Niklasreuth were merged into the Municipality of Fischbachau.

== Culture ==
=== Notable persons ===
- Kathi Greinsberger, Volkslied composer
- Josef Brunnhuber (1876–1936), periodist
- Eduard Stemplinger (1870–1964), author
- Fritz Müller-Partenkirchen (1875–1942), author
- Amelie Kober (born 1987), snowboarder
- Max Rauffer (born 1972), snowboarder
- Benjamin Lauth (born 1981), football player
- Paul Schneider-Esleben (1915–2005), architect
- Karl Höller (1907–1987), composer

=== Bands ===
- Fischbachauer Sängerinnen
- Fischbachauer Tanzlmusi
- Roaner Sängerinnen
- Musikkapelle Fischbachau

=== Tourism and Sights ===
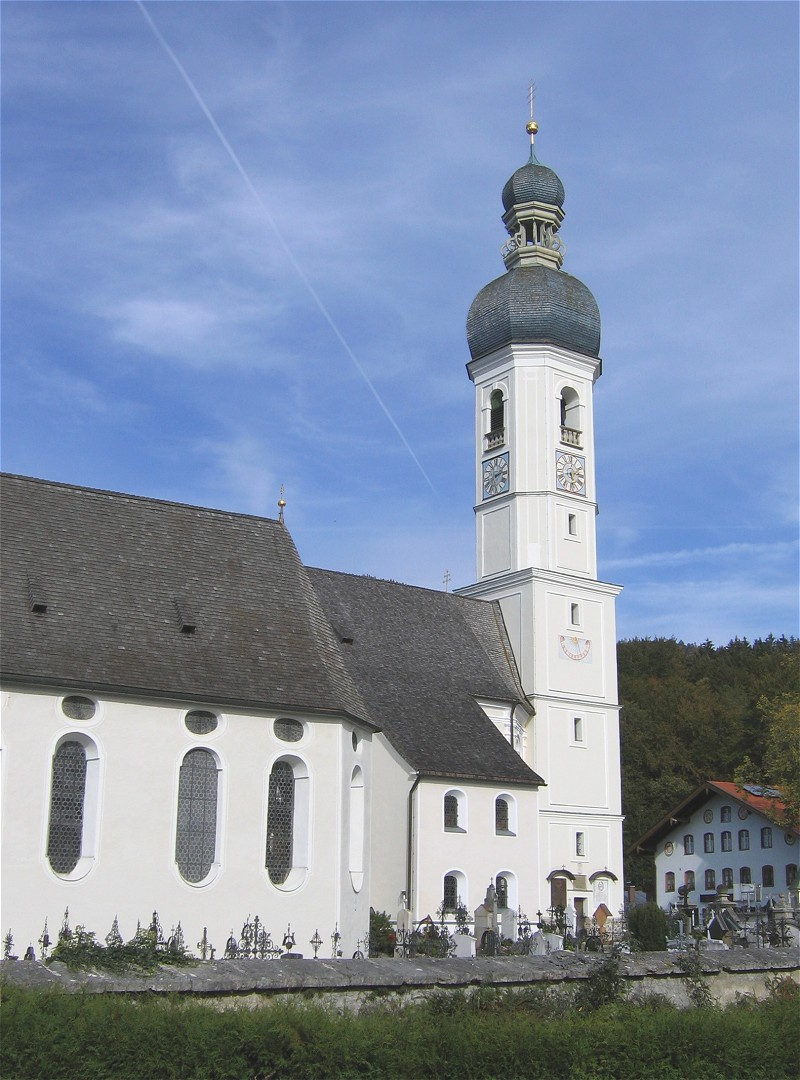
St andreas Church in Elbach

Place	Building
Fischbachau	St. Martin abbey Mariä Schutz Church
Birkenstein	Wallfahrts Chapel
Elbach	St. Andreas Church; Hl. Blut Church; Pfarrhof
Hundham	Leonhard Chapel
Wörnsmühl	Dreifaltigkeit Church
