= Ringelai =

- Municipality
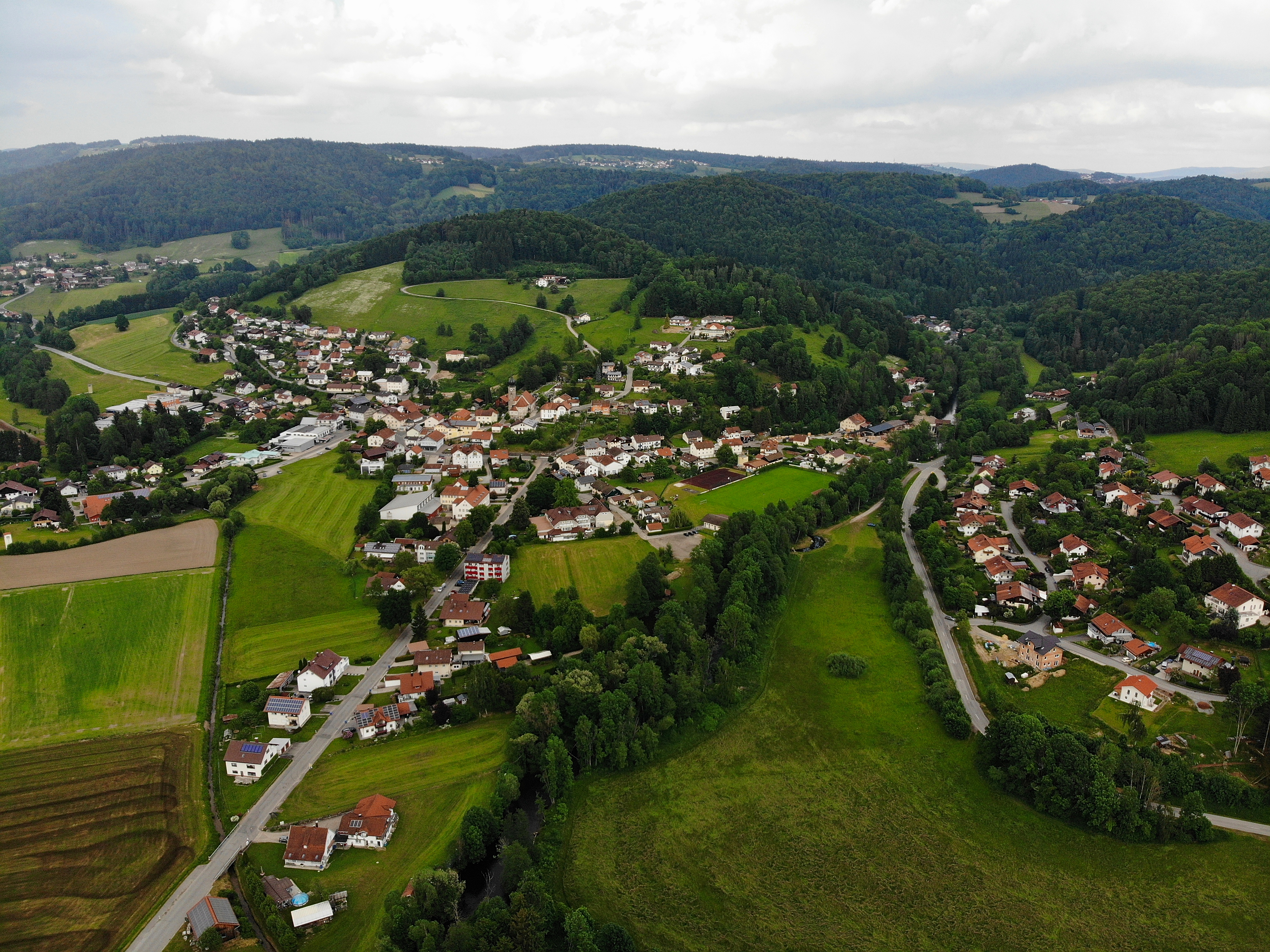
- Ringelai

- Coat of arms

- Location of Ringelai within Freyung-Grafenau district
- Interactive map of Ringelai
- Location within Germany Location within Bavaria
- Coordinates: 48°49′N 13°29′E
- Country: Germany
- State: Bavaria
- Admin. region: Niederbayern
- District: Freyung-Grafenau

Government
  - Mayor (2020–26): Carolin Pecho (SPD)

Area
  - Total: 16.39 km^{2} (6.33 sq mi)
- Elevation: 425 m (1,394 ft)

Population (2025-12-31)
  - Total: 1,878
  - Density: 114.6/km^{2} (296.8/sq mi)
- Time zone: UTC+01:00 (CET)
  - Summer (DST): UTC+02:00 (CEST)
- Postal codes: 94160
- Dialling codes: 08555
- Vehicle registration: FRG
- Website: www.ringelai.de

Ringelai is a municipality in the Lower Bavarian district of Freyung-Grafenau, Bavaria, Germany. It is also known as Schmalzdobl and the Meran of the Bavarian Forest.

== Etymology ==
The strange name is difficult to interpret, but probably refers to the body (Verleib, from Old High German laiba) of a settlement called Ringolo.

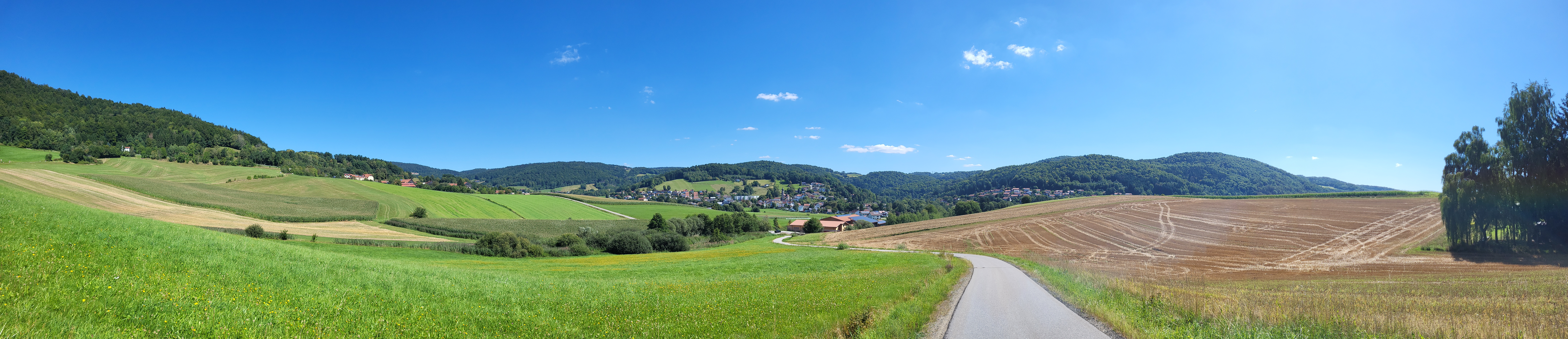
Panoramic view of Ringelai

== History ==
The village was first referenced in 1312 as part of the Kloster Niedernburg Passau, when someone named Christian von ring Laib appeared as a witness at a farm sale. Early reports indicate that the village, unlike the ones nearby, had fertile soil and a good quality of life. It was also the place were the border between the Diocese of Passau and Electorate of Bavaria, with there still being boundary stones from 1691 at the Geistlicher Stein. Ringelai got its first church in 1752, the Maria Patrona Bavariae, that was later renovated in the 20th century. It joined Bavaria in 1805.

On 27 April 1951, the municipality of Kühbach was officially renamed to Ringelai, with Kühbach now being a small village in the municipality. In 1978, Ringelai joined Perlesreut administrative community (Verwaltungsgemeinschaft Perlesreut), alongside Fürsteneck and Perlesreut itself.
