= Maria Patrona Bavariae =

- Pfarrkirche St. Michael (German)
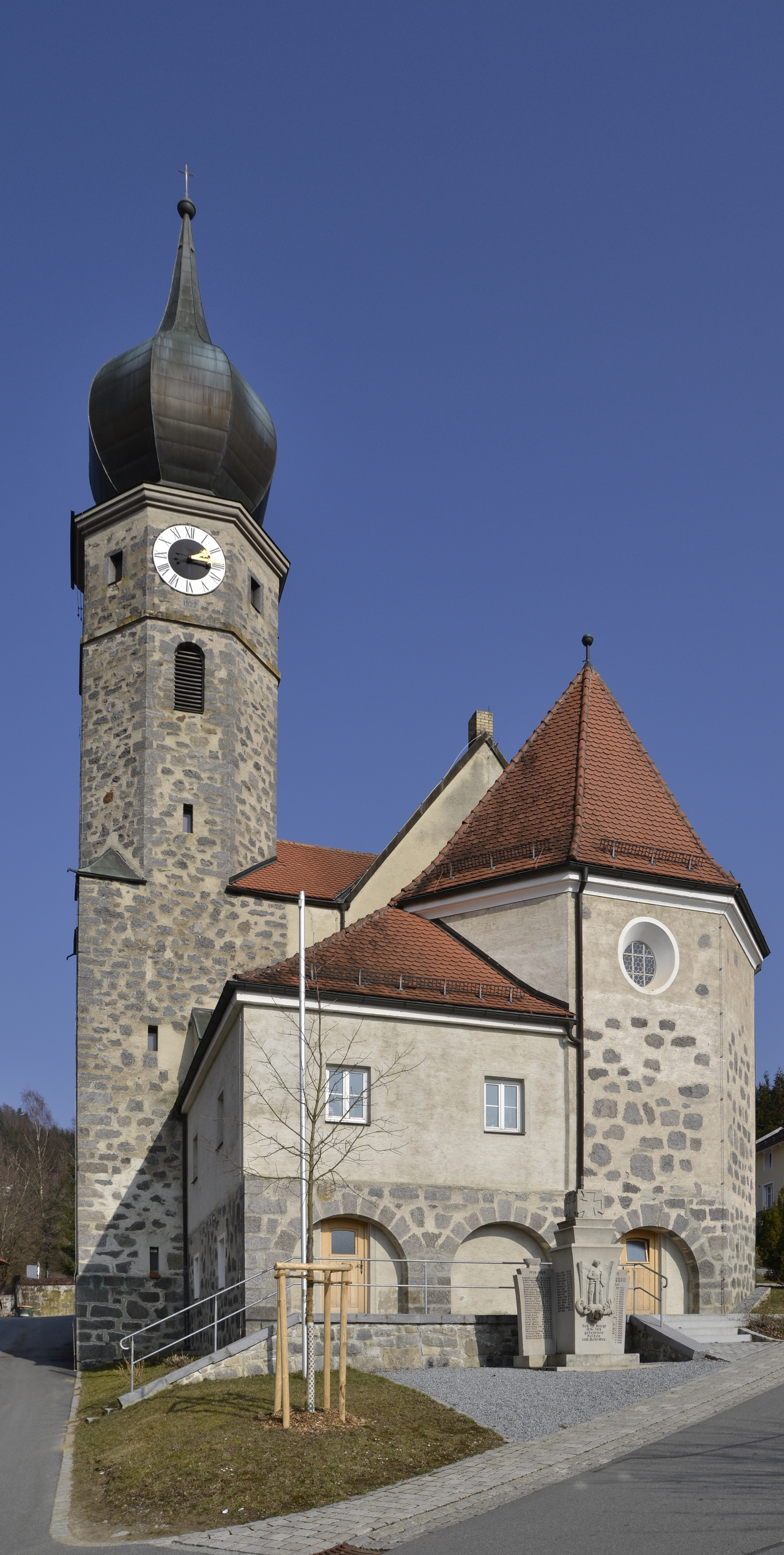
- The church from north-west

- Location within Germany Location within Bavaria
- 48°49′N 13°29′E
- Location: Ringelai, Niederbayern, Bavaria
- Address: Pfarrer-Kainz street 5
- Country: Germany
- Denomination: Roman-catholic

History
- Status: active

Architecture
- Years built: (Chapel) 15th century (First church) 1749-1752 (Today's church) 1919-1920

Clergy
- Priest: Johannes Spitaler

Maria Patrona Bavariae (Latin for 'Maria, saviour of Bavaria'; German: Maria, Beschützerin Bayerns, also Pfarrkirche St. Michael) is a Roman-catholic and the only church in Ringelai.

== History ==
The first chapel was built in the 15th century as a side church of the main one in Perlesreut, dedicated to St. Michael. A church was built in 1749 to 1752 by the plans of Severin Goldberger (1695–1758), again dedicated to St. Michael. After plans were made to found a separate parish for Ringelai in 1894, a church building association was founded in New Year's eve of 1903 and later a parish hall. A cemetery was built in 1908 and 11 years later the construction of a new and bigger church was announced. German architect Michael Kurz planned the construction in 1919, finishing on November 22, 1920. As of now, the church has a side church in Neidberg called St. Heart of Jesus, built in 1923, serving as a chapel for the retirement home in Neidberg until 1989.

== Architecture and furnishing ==
The church has a hall made of unplastered stone masonry with a stitch cap vault,. It is plastered white on the inside, the architectural structural elements, such as the vault ribs are gray. The ceiling fresco shows Christ rising from the grave.

The church is equipped with three altars in baroque shapes. They are made of black marble and are richly decorated with ornamental decorative elements made of gold-plated stucco. The altarpiece of the main altar is a colored relief with a Madonna in a halo.

Next to the cemetery, the church grounds also have a parish hall and a small choir room.

=== Bells ===
There are four bells. The first bell is a bronze one from 1479, while the three other ones are from 1922 made of steel in Bochum.

== Priests ==
The first ever priest of the church was Josef Kainz from 1921 to 1937, the second one was Matthias Siglmüller from 1937 to 1941, the third Karl Scheuchenzuber from 1941 to 1948 and after him Leo Nentwich until 1953. As of 2024, the priest is Johannes Spitaler.
