= Breitenstein (mountain) =

Mountain in Bavaria, Germany

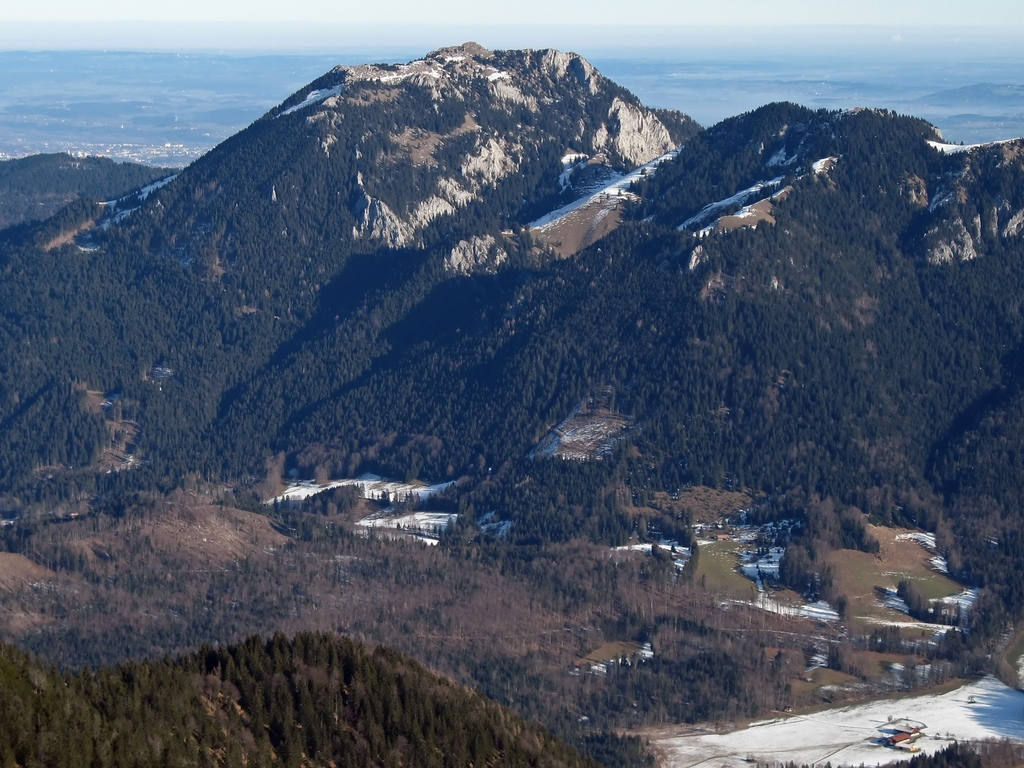

Highest point
- Elevation: 1,622 m (5,322 ft)
- Prominence: 271 m (889 ft)
- Isolation: 2.5 km (1.6 mi)Wendelstein
- Coordinates: 47°43′20″N 11°59′21″E

Geography
- Location within Germany
- Location: Bavaria, Germany
- Parent range: Bavarian Prealps

Climbing
- Easiest route: Fischbachau - Kesselalm - Hubertushütte - Breitenstein

Breitenstein (German pronunciation: [ˈbʁaɪtn̩ˌʃtaɪn]) is a 1,622 m (5,322 ft) high mountain of the Bavarian Prealps.

== Normal routes ==
The most common route is from Fischbachau to the Kesselalm continuing via the Hubertushütte to the summit. The route to the mountain is popular and can get quite crowded on weekends.
