= Brünnstein =

Coordinates: 47°39′N 12°06′E

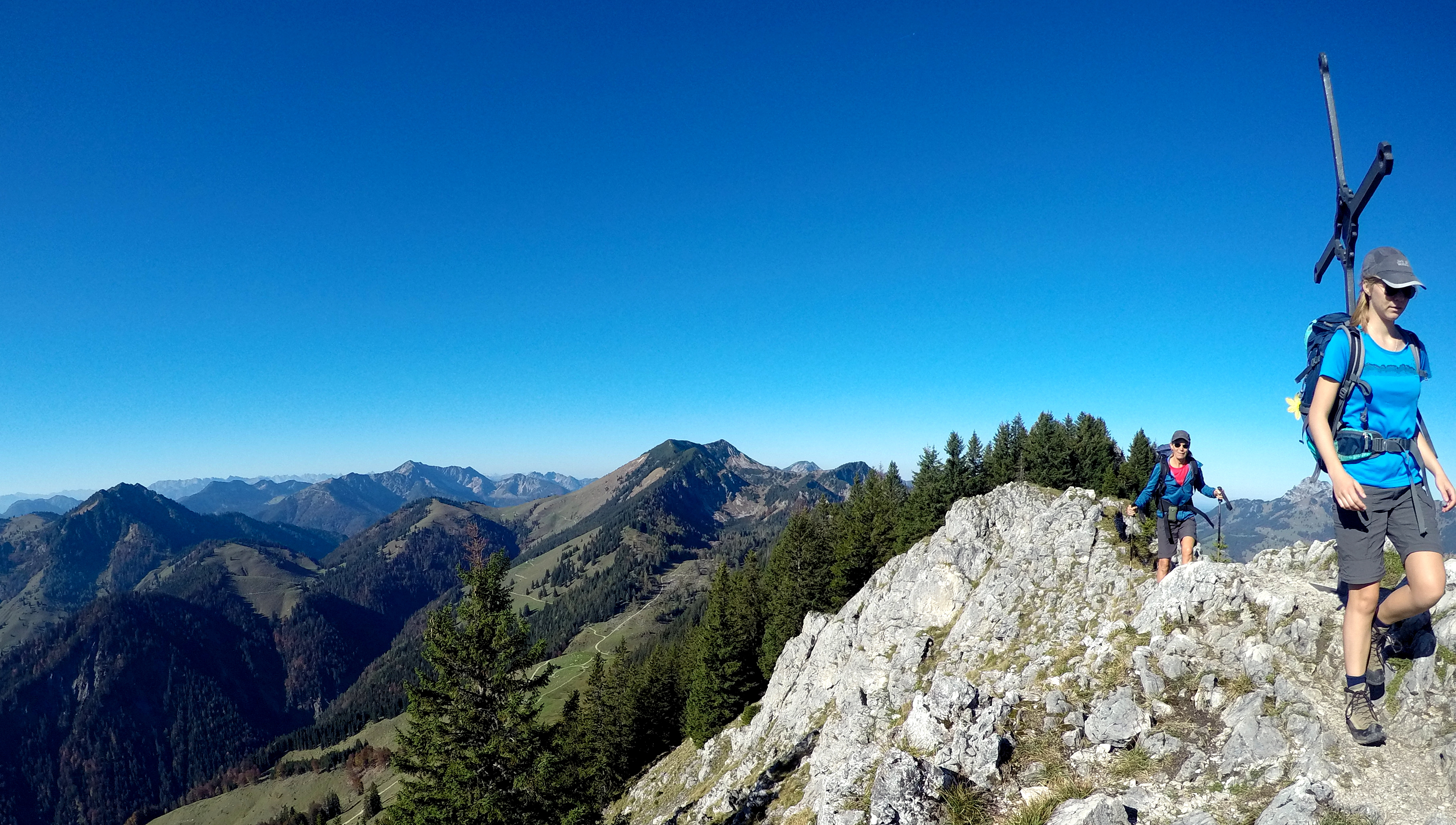
- Brünnstein, Bavaria, summit cross on east summit

Highest point
- Elevation: 1,634 m (5,361 ft)

Geography
- Location: Bavaria, Germany

Brünnstein is a mountain of Bavaria, Germany.
