= Breitenstein (Swabian Jura) =

- Location within Germany

Highest point
- Elevation: 811 m (2,661 ft)
- Coordinates: 48°34′59″N 9°30′05″E

Geography
- Location: Baden-Württemberg, Germany
- Parent range: Swabian Jura

Breitenstein (German pronunciation: [ˈbʁaɪtn̩ˌʃtaɪn]) is a mountain of Baden-Württemberg, Germany. The Breitenstein is an 811.6 m above sea level. NHN high plateau in Baden-Württemberg. It is near the village Ochsenwang near the county road 1220. The distance to the municipality Bissingen an der Teck is around 5 kilometers. The rocky outcrop consists of Jurassic rock and is situated on the northern edge of the Swabian Jura right on the escarpment. Of the approximately 200 meters wide plateau of Breitenstein, you can enjoy a broad view of the approximately 400 meters below, north of the Swabian Jura area location, in the north-west to Stuttgart. Therefore, Breitenstein is a popular destination. On the plateau, Breitenstein is a bronze plaque, in which the location and distance of the visible places can be found.

== Gallery ==
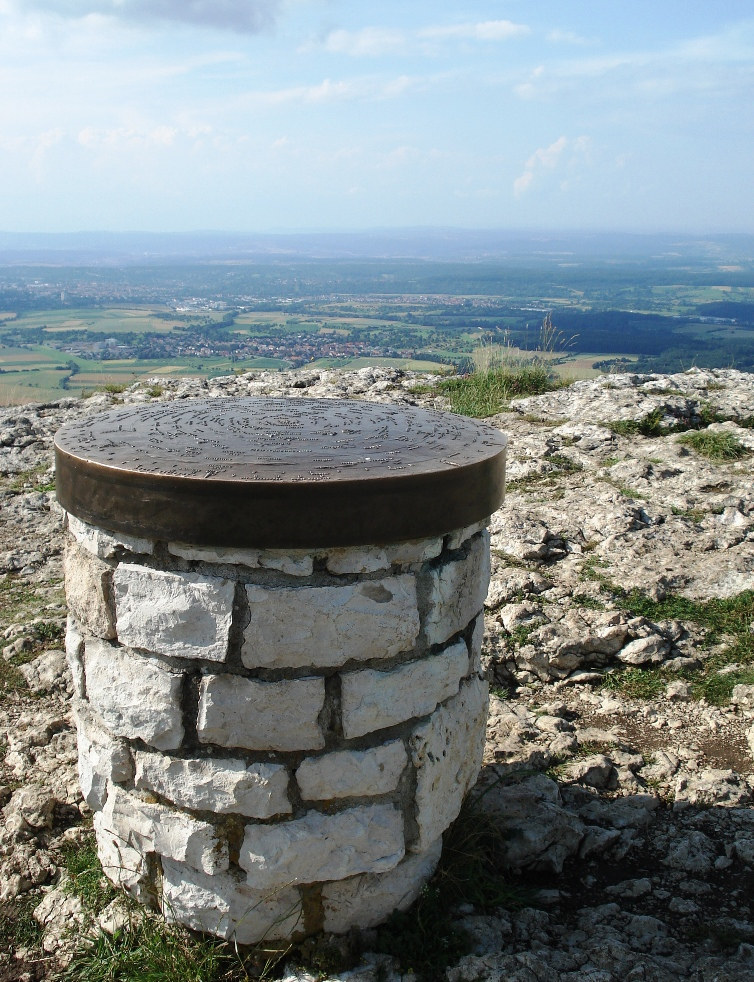
Breitenstein - Infotafel - Information desk

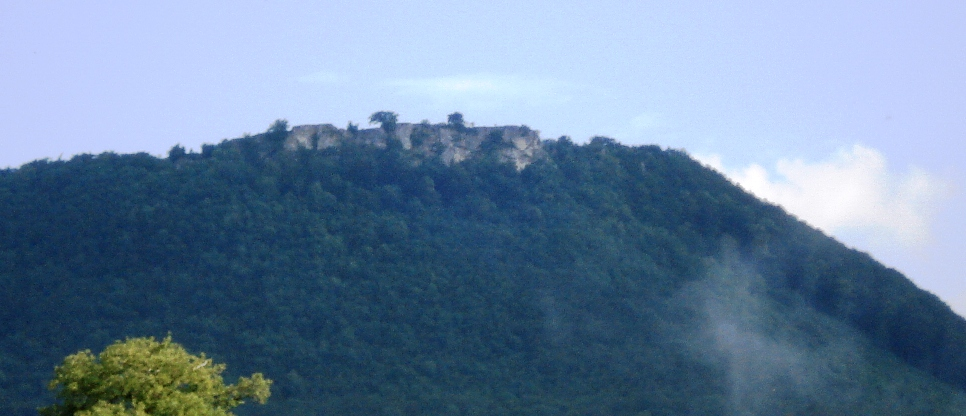
Breitenstein
