= Wildalpjoch =

Mountain in Bavaria, Germany

Coordinates: 47°42′N 12°02′E

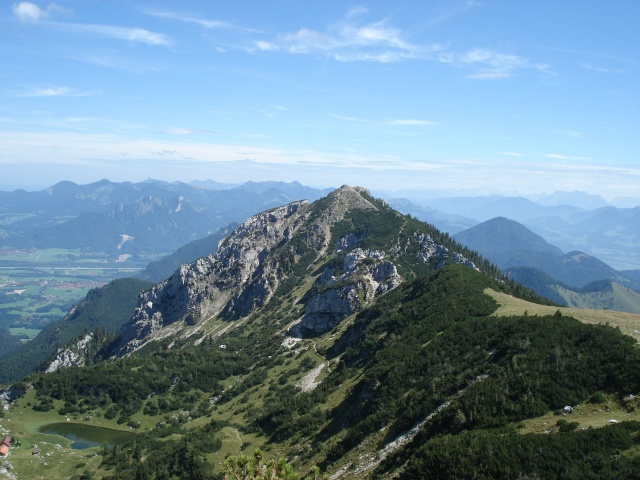
- Wildalpjoch from the Kesselwand.

Highest point
- Elevation: 1,720 m (5,640 ft)

Geography
- Location: Bavaria, Germany

Wildalpjoch is a mountain of Bavaria, Germany.
