= Soin (mountain) =

Mountain in Bavaria, Germany

Coordinates: 47°42′21″N 12°01′14″E

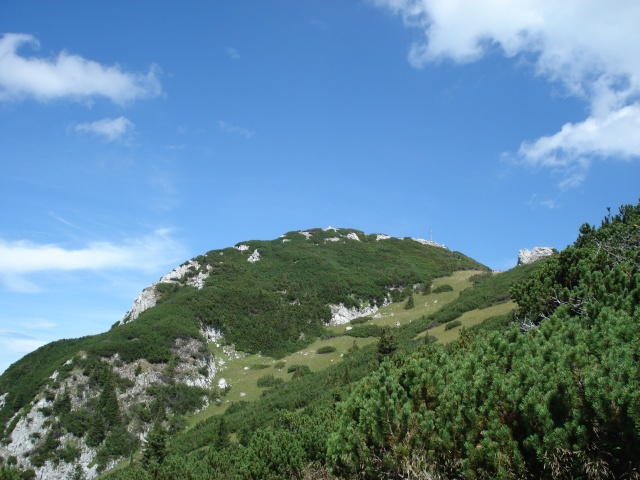
- Soin viewed from Zeller Scharte

Highest point
- Elevation: 1,756 m (5,761 ft)

Geography
- Location: Bavaria, Germany

Soin is a 1756 meter high mountain in Bavaria, Germany.
