= House of Urach =

Cadet branch of the House of Württemberg

- Ducal coat of arms of the Modern House of Urach
- Parent house: House of Württemberg
- Country: Germany and Lithuania
- Founded: 1867; 159 years ago – Wilhelm, Duke of Urach, younger surviving son of Duke Wilhelm of Württemberg, younger brother of King Frederick I of Württemberg. Roots: 1024; 1002 years ago (as Württemberg).
- Final ruler: Lithuania: Mindaugas II (1918; 108 years ago)
- Titles: King of Lithuania; Duke of Urach; Prince (Fürst) of Urach; Count of Württemberg

The House of Urach is a morganatic cadet branch of the formerly royal House of Württemberg. Although the Württemberg dynasty was one of many reigning over small realms in Germany into the 20th century, and despite the fact that marital mésalliances in these dynasties usually disinherited the descendants thereof, the Dukes of Urach unusually managed to elicit consideration for candidacy for the thrones of several European states, viz. the Kingdom of Württemberg, the abortive Kingdom of Lithuania, the Principality of Monaco and even the Principality of Albania. Although none of these prospects came to fruition, they reflected monarchical attempts to accommodate the rapid shifts in national allegiance, regime and international alliances that intensified throughout the 19th century, leading up to and following Europe's Great War of 1914–1918.

== Origins ==
=== Medieval ===
The comital House of Urach were part of Swabian nobility in the 12th to 13th centuries, with their ancestral seat at Urach.

The first mention of the name dates to the early 11th century, with the brothers Egino and Rudolf, whose seat was at Dettingen. Older historiography points to an origin of the name in the given name Unruoch, possibly Unruoch III (d. 874) of the Unruochings. More recent literature prefers an origin of the name in toponymy, derived from of Aura. The two brothers built Achalm Castle circa 1050. Rudolf and his heirs form the lineage of the Counts of Achalm, while Egino's heirs (either Egino II or III), in the 12th century, built another castle in the upper Erms valley (now Bad Urach).

After the extinction of the Zähringer line in 1218, Egino IV inherited parts of their possessions due to his 1180 marriage to Agnes of Zähringen. Egino V won a dispute over further parts of the Zähringen inheritance, and he moved his seat to Freiburg where he ruled as Egino I, count of Freiburg. Egino V (I) and his brothers supported the rebellion Henry VII of Germany but were beaten in battle in 1235. The counts of Urach declined in the 1250s; their line became extinct in 1261; their territories were incorporated into the County of Württemberg.

=== Modern ===
The title of count or duke of Urach was revived in the 18th and 19th centuries for morganatic lineages of the House of Württemberg.

In the early modern period, the Duchy of Württemberg often found itself in the theatre of war as French and Austrian armies fought to extend the hegemony of the rival houses of Bourbon and Habsburg on the European continent. During the 17th and 18th centuries the duchy resisted repeated French invasions.

Although Duke Frederick III was nominally a subject of the Holy Roman Emperor Francis II, as an ally of Napoleon I he assumed the higher title of Elector in 1803, and when the Holy Roman Empire was abolished in 1806 leaving the Duchy of Württemberg without a suzerain, the Elector embraced complete independence, assuming the title King of Württemberg.

The Kingdom of Württemberg survived until 1918 as part of the Confederation of the Rhine and later the German Empire, and was ruled by four kings:

1. Frederick I (1806–1816)
2. William I (1816–1864)
3. Charles I (1864–1891)
4. William II (1891–1918)

The House of Urach was founded by the secret marriage of Duke Wilhelm of Württemberg (1761–1830), a younger brother of the reigning Duke Frederick III (later King Frederick I), with Wilhelmine Rhodis von Tunderfeld (1777-1822) at Coswig, Anhalt on 28 August 1800. Although she signed the wedding contract as "Baroness von Tunderfeld-Rhodis", the bride's father Karl August Rhodis held no barony, and his family had assumed Burgrave von Tunderfeld as a hereditary title since an ancestor had once held the post of burgrave at Narva. Although by dynastic arrangement Duke Wilhelm's wife was officially recognised as a Württemberg princess on 30 April 1801 and the marriage was acknowledged publicly on 1 August 1801, Duke Wilhelm's formal renunciation of his dynastic rights in Württemberg was also accepted on the latter date. The male-line, non-dynastic descendants of this marriage constitute the House of Urach.

== Members of the family ==
However, not all of the issue of the marriage were recognised as princes or dukes. Initially, the children of this marriage were accorded only the title Count/Countess von Württemberg. The eldest son, Count Alexander (1801-1844), married Countess Ilona Festetics von Tolna in 1832 (daughter of the Croatian Count Ladislas Festetics von Tolna (1785–1846) and his wife, born Princess Josephine of Hohenzollern-Hechingen). The last of his four children died in 1911, the two sons leaving no issue to bear the Württemberg comital title.

Alexander's sister Marie (1815-1866) was Countess von Württemberg until her marriage in 1842, and she became Countess von Taubenheim.

King Frederick and Duke Wilhelm's youngest brother, Duke Karl Heinrich of Württemberg (1772–1838), also married morganatically, under the alias "Count von Sontheim" in 1798, with Christiane-Caroline Alexei (d. 1838), who received from the King, along with her children, the titles Baroness/Baron von Hochberg und Rottenburg in 1807 and, in 1825, Countess/Count von Württemberg. The two surviving daughters, Marie (1802-1882) and Alexandrine (1803-1884), married, respectively, Karl, Prince of Hohenlohe-Kirchberg in 1821 and Charles, Count Arpeau de Gallatin in 1830.

== Dukes ==
Count Wilhelm von Württemberg (1810-1869), Duke Wilhelm's third son, would become the first Duke von Urach in 1867 and ancestor of the current princely Urach line. Although both of his marriages were to dynastic princesses, he wed them as a count, marrying Théodelinde de Beauharnais, Princess of Leuchtenburg (1814–1857) in 1841 and Princess Florestine of Monaco (1833–1897) in 1863.

Following the 1863 marriage of the widowed Count Wilhelm von Württemberg to Princess Florestine, sister of Prince Charles III of Monaco (1818–1889) and second in the line of succession to the Monegasque throne after her nephew, Hereditary Prince Albert (1848–1922), Count Wilhelm took up residence in Monte Carlo while retaining property in Württemberg. On 28 May 1867, King Karl raised his cousin, Count Wilhelm, to Duke of Urach in the nobility of Württemberg. Urach had been an hereditary fief of the family for centuries, whose territorial designation the new duke would bear without thereby acquiring any actual prerogatives or property in Urach or Württemberg. Although the new ducal house remained ineligible to succeed to the crown of the Kingdom of Württemberg, it could succeed to that of the Principality of Monaco.

The 2nd Duke von Urach, Wilhelm, who first married Duchess Amalie in Bavaria (1865–1912) in 1892 and then Princess Wiltrud of Bavaria (1884-1975) in 1924, not only came close to wearing the crown of Lithuania, but lost the prospect of the Monegasque throne in the Monaco Succession Crisis of 1918. Given that his kinsmen the Dukes of Teck had been Anglicized, he might have been next in the line of succession to inherit the Kingdom of Württemberg in 1921 after the death of its last king, William II, had morganatic status not been a hindrance, and had the monarchy not been abolished in 1918. In 1913, Wilhelm had been one of several princes considered for the throne of Albania, which, despite support for Wilhelm from Catholic groups in the north, was conferred instead upon Prince William of Wied in 1914.

The current and 5th duke (according to the 1867 grant) is Wilhelm Albert, Duke of Urach (b. 1957), who since 1991 has been married to Karen von Brauchitsch (Grafin Berghe von Trips, by 1988 adoption). They have a son, Prince Karl-Philipp (born 1992) and two daughters. Wilhelm inherited the dukedom from his brother, the 4th Duke Karl Anselm (born 1955), who renounced the title on 16 February 1991, a few weeks after his marriage to Saskia Wüsthof. Their uncle, Karl Gero (1899–1981), had been the 3rd Duke, but left no children. He had been preceded in the title by his father Duke Wilhem (1864-1928), his elder brother Prince Wilhelm (1897-1957) having renounced his right of succession in January 1928 to marry Elisabeth Theurer.

== Property ==
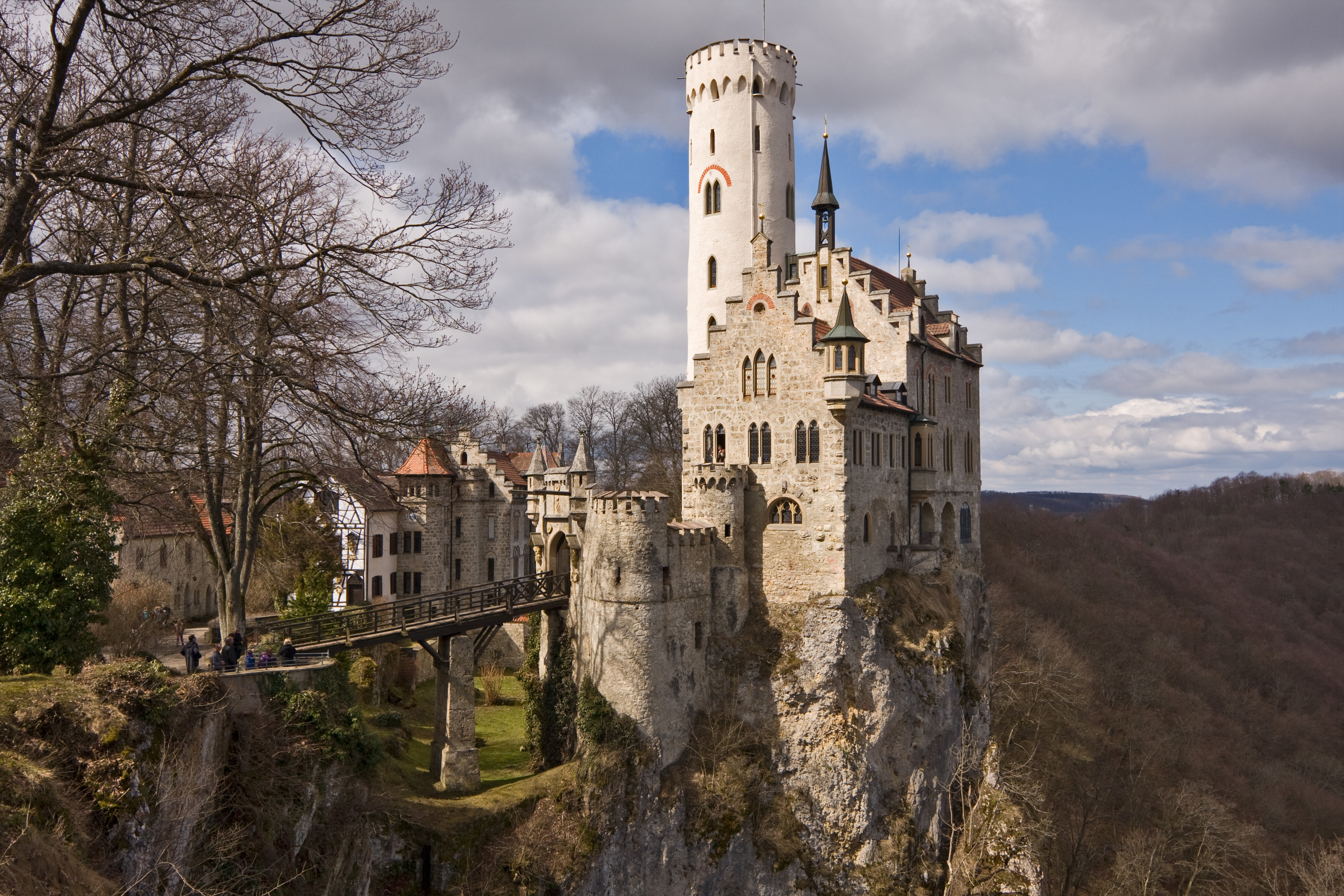
Lichtenstein Castle (Württemberg), reconstructed in 1840 by Wilhelm, 1st Duke of Urach

The House of Urach established three Familienfideikommissen during its history: the Württemberg Countship Trust for the Counts of Württemberg, the Urach Ducal Trust for the Dukes of Urach, and the Urach Princely Trust for Prince Karl of Urach (1865-1925), the younger son of Duke Wilhelm who was not expected to inherit his father's dukedom and who died childless.

The comital trust was set up in October 1837, originally for the brothers Count Alexander (1801-1844) and Count Wilhelm (1810-1869, later 1st Duke of Urach), funded by an inheritance from a childless uncle, Duke Ferdinand of Württemberg (1763–1834), as stipulated in his will. Still extant, although subject to substantial modern legal restrictions, the ducal trust came to include, besides liquid assets, several castles, town houses, farmlands, hunting grounds, commercial and rental buildings, and other property in Germany, France and Monaco, notably Lichtenstein Castle which remains the hereditary seat of the dukes.

Like the ducal trust, the title Duke of Urach was hereditary by agnatic primogeniture in the legitimate descent of the first duke, with cadets and females bearing the title of Prince/Princess of Urach (the royal letters patent mandated use of the term Fürst/Fürstin for "Prince/Princess" rather than the term Prinz/Prinzessin. Although both words translate as "prince" in English, Fürst, when used for cadets and not referring to a reigning sovereign, indicates noble rather than dynastic status, whereas Prinz was usually confined in use to cadets of ruling and mediatized families). In Württemberg, only dynasts descended in male-line from the nation's kings were titled Prinz, while those descending from the first king's brothers remained dukes). The name and title Count/Countess von Württemberg was explicitly preserved for the Urach dukes and princes rather than being replaced by the higher titles.

== Lithuania ==
Despite being ineligible to reign in Germany, in 1918 the House of Urach was invited to rule another country – the Kingdom of Lithuania. On June 4, 1918, the Taryba voted to offer the Lithuanian throne to the German prince Wilhelm, 2nd Duke of Urach. He was elected on 11 July 1918 and accepted, taking the name of Mindaugas II, King of Lithuania.

The Kingdom of Lithuania was a short-lived constitutional monarchy created toward the end of World War I when Lithuania was part of the German Empire. The Taryba declared Lithuania's independence on February 16, 1918, but was unable to form a government, police, or other state institutions due to the continued presence of German troops.

The Germans presented various proposals to incorporate Lithuania into an expanded German Empire. The Lithuanians resisted this idea and hoped to preserve their independence by creating a separate constitutional monarchy, so they invited Prince Wilhelm of Urach to become their king.

The reign of Mindaugas II was accepted by the Catholic Church and by several European countries, as is seen in the letter from Pope Benedict XV welcoming Wilhelm's selection as the future King of Lithuania. Such authoritative registers as the Almanach de Gotha also acknowledged the new monarchy.

=== Rules of succession ===
According to the rules of the old House of Urach and to the requirements imposed by the Taryba in 1918, the Head of the House of Urach and of Lithuanian monarchy must:

- be firstborn in the male line;
- document no fewer than 32 noble quarters in ancestry;
- marry or issue from no morganatic marriage with a commoner or a noblewoman of fewer than 32 noble quarters;
- hold military rank;
- undertake to learn the Lithuanian language;
- reside in Lithuania.

Succession to the throne of Lithuania was to be hereditary in the House of Urach. Prince Inigo von Urach (b. 1962, brother of Duke Wilhelm Albert) has been recognised by some monarchists as the rightful claimant. Although born the youngest of five children, Prince Inigo is the only one of three brothers alleged to comply with all the requirements to become King of Lithuania (House of Urach rules + Taryba rules): His wife, Baroness Danielle von und zu Bodman (b. 1963), belongs to a Uradel family whose nobility in Swabia has been authenticated back to 1152, and whose mother, born Isabelle de Guyard, Countess von Saint Julien von und zu Wallsee is a direct descendant of Pierre Guyard (fl. 1418), to which family had belonged the crusader Guillaume Guyard who flourished in 1280, the family being made Imperial counts in 1627. The couple wed civilly 21 September 1991, their elder son, Eberhard, being born in 1990 and the younger, Anselm, on 29 November 1992.

While Duke Karl Anselm renounced his succession to marry morganatically, the current Duke Wilhelm Albert was unconvinced as to whether his own marriage to Karen von Brauchitsch-Berghe von Trips was also morganatic as she did not meet the immediate requirement of 32 noble ancestors. The brothers ultimately agreed that Wilhelm Albert would remain head of the House of Urach in Germany while Inigo would be head of the House in Lithuania.

=== Ancestors of the House of Urach ===
Family Tree of the Last Lithuanian Royal Family
Prince Inigo von Urach (current Head of the House of Urach in Lithuania)	Father: Prince Eberhard of Urach	Paternal Grandfather: Mindaugas II (King of Lithuania)	Paternal Great-grandfather: Wilhelm, 1st Duke of Urach
Prince Inigo von Urach (current Head of the House of Urach in Lithuania)	Father: Prince Eberhard of Urach	Paternal Grandfather: Mindaugas II (King of Lithuania)	Paternal Great-grandmother: Princess Florestine of Monaco
Prince Inigo von Urach (current Head of the House of Urach in Lithuania)	Father: Prince Eberhard of Urach	Paternal Grandmother: Duchess Amalie in Bavaria	Paternal Great-grandfather: Karl Theodor, Duke in Bavaria
Prince Inigo von Urach (current Head of the House of Urach in Lithuania)	Father: Prince Eberhard of Urach	Paternal Grandmother: Duchess Amalie in Bavaria	Paternal Great-grandmother: Princess Sophie of Saxony
Prince Inigo von Urach (current Head of the House of Urach in Lithuania)	Mother: Princess Iniga of Thurn and Taxis	Maternal Grandfather: Prince Ludwig Philipp of Thurn and Taxis	Maternal Great-grandfather: Albert, 8th Prince of Thurn and Taxis
Prince Inigo von Urach (current Head of the House of Urach in Lithuania)	Mother: Princess Iniga of Thurn and Taxis	Maternal Grandfather: Prince Ludwig Philipp of Thurn and Taxis	Maternal Great-grandmother: Archduchess Margarethe Klementine of Austria
Prince Inigo von Urach (current Head of the House of Urach in Lithuania)	Mother: Princess Iniga of Thurn and Taxis	Maternal Grandmother: Princess Elisabeth of Luxembourg (1901–1950)	Maternal Great-grandfather: William IV, Grand Duke of Luxembourg
Prince Inigo von Urach (current Head of the House of Urach in Lithuania)	Mother: Princess Iniga of Thurn and Taxis	Maternal Grandmother: Princess Elisabeth of Luxembourg (1901–1950)	Maternal Great-grandmother: Infanta Marie Anne of Portugal
