= Prince Inigo of Urach =

Prince Inigo
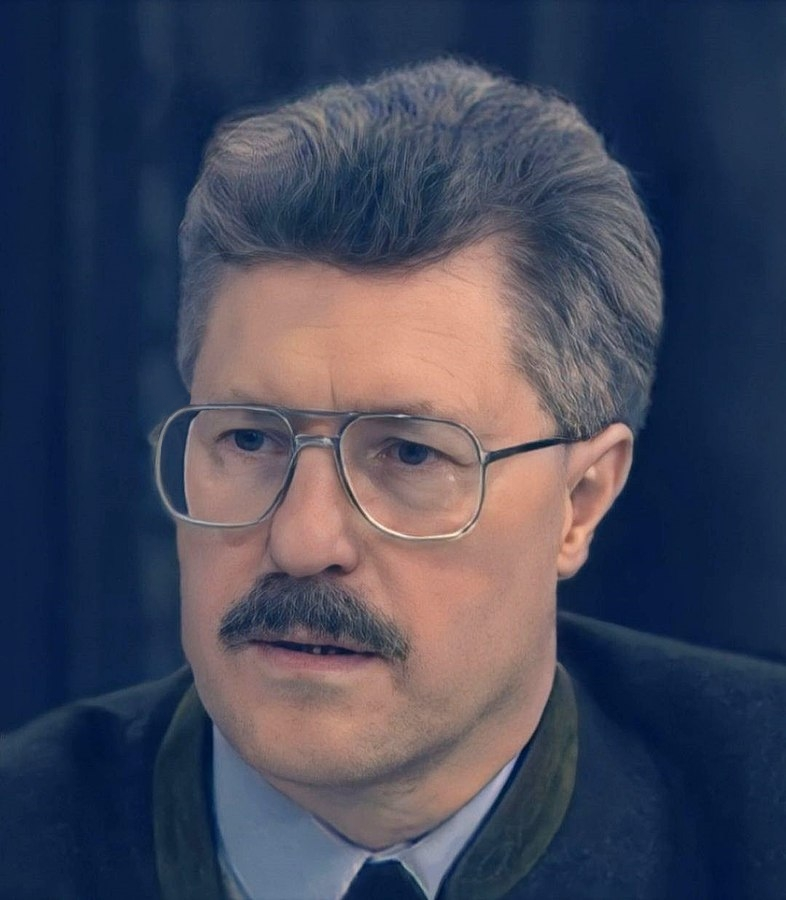
- Inigo in 2022

Head of the House of Urach
- Tenure: 1 February 1992 – present
- Predecessor: Wilhelm Albert of Urach
- Heir apparent: Prince Eberhard
- Born: Eberhard Friedrich Inigo Antonius Maria von Urach; 12 April 1962 (age 64); Bachhausen, Munich, Bavaria, West Germany
- Spouse: Baroness Danielle von und zu Bodman (m. 1991)
- Issue: Prince Eberhard; Prince Anselm; Duchess Amelie
- House: Urach
- Father: Prince Eberhard of Urach
- Mother: Princess Iniga of Thurn and Taxis
- Religion: Roman Catholic
- Military career
- Allegiance: Germany
- Branch: Bundeswehr
- Rank: Oberstleutnant

Prince Inigo of Urach, Count of Württemberg, (German: Eberhard Friedrich Inigo Fürst von Urach; Lithuanian: Princas Eberhardas Frydrichas Inigo fon Urachas; born 12 April 1962) is a member of the House of Urach and the fifth legitimate pretender to the defunct Lithuanian throne. He is the grandson in the male line of King-elect of Lithuania, Wilhelm Karl of Urach, known by his regnal name as Mindaugas II.

== Life, family and education ==
Prince Inigo was born in Bachhausen, Munich, Bavaria, West Germany, on 12 April 1962, as the fifth and youngest child of Prince Eberhard of Urach and Princess Iniga of Thurn and Taxis. Inigo's father died when he was only seven. On 24 September 1991, he married his wife, Baroness Danielle von und zu Bodman at Niederaichbach, Germany, with whom he currently has 3 children – Eberhard (born 1991), Anselm (born 1992) and Amelie Philippa (born 1994). They are second cousins twice removed, being both descendants of Wilhelm, Duke of Urach and their children are the first Prince of Urach to be descended from both of Wilhelm's wives. Inigo is a descendant of several Lithuanian royal and noble dynasties – the Gediminids, the Jagiellons and the Radziwiłłs. In addition, he is connected to the Albanian, British, Liechtenstein, Luxembourgish, Monégasque, Portuguese and Russian royal families by birth.

He is a forester by profession and has served in the Bundeswehr armed forces, participating in international NATO missions, while his wife studied biogenetics. Inigo is a director and manager of several companies. Inigo also holds ownership in companies offering forestal and land rights consulting services in Forstdienstleistungen and Fürst von Urach Consulting UG.

Inigo first visited Lithuania in 2009, when he was 47. From this year onwards, his visits to Lithuania are being organized regularly. Following an invitation from the German Embassy and the Lietuvos Karalystės Rūmai (LKR), (Note: English: Palace of the Kingdom of Lithuania) Prince Inigo was received in the country on 17–21 November 2012. During his time at the House of Signatories, an agreement was signed with the LKR affirming their recognition of his royal candidacy since the marriages of his older brothers are morganatic.

Nonetheless, Inigo subsequently assured the Lithuanian press that the question of monarchy restoration lies with the Lithuanian public, claiming: "If Lithuanians will ever want to revive the monarchy, if they will need my knowledge and experience, I am ready to accept this honour the same way my grandfather did. However, this decision will be not up to me, but to the Lithuanian people." He also expressed his opinion that a dual constitutional monarchy, where the sovereign may veto Parliament's decisions, is a better option than the parliamentary model found in many European monarchies. In a 2018 interview for LRT, Inigo spoke about his efforts to launch a charitable organisation for abandoned babies in Lithuania, just as he had done in Germany.

Inigo speaks German, English and is known to be learning Lithuanian. He is also known to be supporting a Lithuanian cultural centre in Germany.

== Political views ==
=== Nuclear energy ===
Inigo is an outspoken critic of nuclear energy, deeming it to be costly and unpromising in the long run and urging to focus on sustainable energy instead. "I think that nuclear energy is a cul-de-sac. Uranium, like oil are finite and limited resources," the Prince has said in an interview. "And also all the pollution related to the fuel, production, use and later destruction. The best solution is green-energies. Let us recall the Gospel of Matthew: Is it human that your child asks for bread, and you give him a stone? And what we do, we leave all these problems to our children and grandchildren," he added. Inigo has reacted positively to the shutdown of Ignalina Nuclear Power Plant in Lithuania, by saying that the nuclear waste it produced was raying, poisonous, and "dangerous for fifty thousand years". He is involved in the anti-nuclear power movement in Lithuania as an environmental and energy expert.

== Notes ==
Prince Inigo of Urach House of Urach Cadet branch of the House of Württemberg Born: 12 April 1962
Titles in pretence
Preceded by Wilhelm Albert, Duke of Urach	— TITULAR — King of Lithuania; 1 February 1992 – present Reason for succession failure: Preposition to restore the monarchy withdrawn in 1918 by the Council of Lithuania	Incumbent; Heir: Prince Eberhard of Urach
