= Duke of Urach =

Title in the Kingdom of Württemberg

Arms granted to the dukes in 1867

The title of Duke of Urach (German: Herzog von Urach) was created in the Kingdom of Württemberg on 28 March 1867 for Friedrich Wilhelm Alexander Ferdinand, Count of Württemberg, with the style of Serene Highness. The first Duke of Urach was the first head of the House of Urach.

== Family ==
Wilhelm, 1st Duke of Urach, was the son of Duke Wilhelm of Württemberg (1761-1830) and his morganatic wife, Baroness (Freiin) Wilhelmine von Tunderfeldt-Rhodis (1777-1822), whom he married at Coswig on 23 August 1800. His paternal grandfather was Duke Friedrich II Eugen (1732-1797), from whom all claimants to the Kingdom of Württemberg are descended. Because of his first marriage to Théodolinde de Beauharnais, the first Duke had converted to Catholicism.

His second marriage to Her Serene Highness Princess Florestine of Monaco in 1863 led in part to Wilhelm's elevation in 1867 from being a Count of Wurttemberg to Duke (Herzog) von Urach. He had served the Kingdom well in his career, and the dukedom of 1867 elevated him to his wife's rank of Serene Highness.

The 2nd Duke of Urach was briefly chosen as Mindaugas II, King of Lithuania in 1918. In the same year the Monaco Succession Crisis of 1918 ended his claim through his mother to the throne of Monaco.

The family still owns Lichtenstein Castle, rebuilt by the first duke in the 1840s.

== Dukes of Urach (1867) ==
No.	Name	Portrait	Birth	Death	Reign started	Reign ended
1	Wilhelm		6 July 1810	17 July 1869 (Aged 59)	28 March 1867	17 July 1869
2	Wilhelm Karl/Mindaugas II		3 March 1864	24 March 1928 (Aged 64)	17 July 1869 (As King of Lithuania: 11 July 1918)	24 March 1928 (As King of Lithuania: 2 November 1918)
3	Karl Gero		19 August 1899	15 August 1981 (Aged 81)	24 March 1928	15 August 1981
4	Karl Anselm		5 February 1955	(Age 68)	15 August 1981	9 February 1991
5	Wilhelm Albert		9 August 1957	(Age 66)	9 February 1991	
Heir apparent	Prince Karl Philipp of Urach		1992			

All legal privileges of the nobility were officially abolished in 1919 by the Weimar Republic (1919-1933), and nobility is no longer conferred or recognized by the Federal Republic of Germany, former hereditary titles being allowed only as part of the surname.

== See also ==
- Coat of arms of Württemberg
- History of Württemberg
- Uradel
- Duke of Teck
