= Convention of Mantua =

1814 treaty between France and Austria

The Convention of Mantua was an agreement signed by Eugène de Beauharnais and Heinrich Graf von Bellegarde on 24 April 1814 that returned the territories of the Napoleonic Kingdom of Italy to provisional Austrian rule.

Napoleon created himself King of Italy on 17 March 1805, and he was crowned with the Iron Crown of Lombardy in Milan on 26 May 1805. He made his stepson, Eugène de Beauharnais, Viceroy on 5 June 1805, and later his heir presumptive to the Italian crown.

After being defeated by the Sixth Coalition in 1813-14, Napoleon abdicated in favour of his son Napoleon II, the King of Rome, on 6 April 1814. He signed the Treaty of Fontainebleau on 11 April, under which he abdicated again, unconditionally, and was exiled to Elba. Eugène found himself surrounded by hostile forces, with the main Austrian force advancing from the east, the British, Sicilians and more Austrians attacking from Genoa, and forces from the Kingdom of Naples commanded by its king, Joachim Murat, advancing from the south. The Agreement of Schiarino-Rizzino was agreed on 16 April outside Mantua, which enabled Eugène to keep control of his territory. Eugène attempted to have himself crowned as the new King of Italy, but he was opposed by the Senate of the Kingdom, and an insurrection in Milan on 20 April ended his hopes of taking the Italian crown.

Eugène signed the Convention of Mantua on 24 April, allowing the Austrian commander, Bellegarde, to cross the River Minco and occupy Milan, and northern Italy returned to Austrian rule on 27 April. Eugène retired to Munich, the capital of his father-in-law, Maximilian I Joseph of Bavaria.

Austrian control of Lombardy and Venetia was confirmed by the Congress of Vienna, and the territories were joined as the Kingdom of Lombardy–Venetia on 7 April 1815. The Papal States were returned to the Pope.
