= Eugène de Beauharnais =

French statesman and military officer (1781–1824)

- Duke of Leuchtenberg, Prince of Eichstätt, Prince of Venice
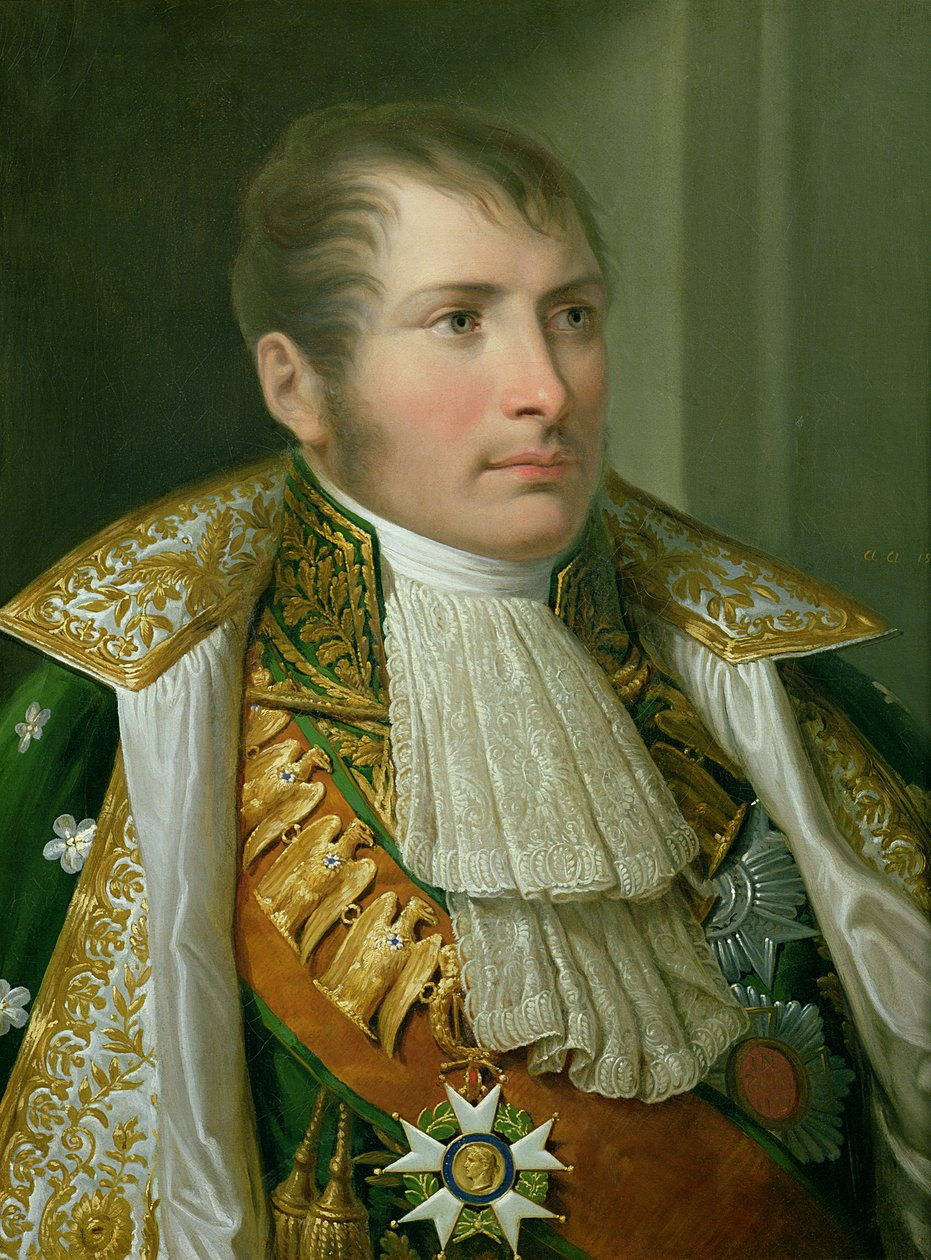
- Portrait by Andrea Appiani, 1810

Viceroy of Italy
- Term: 5 June 1805 – 11 April 1814
- Monarch: Napoleon I

Grand Duke of Frankfurt
- Reign: 26 October 1813 – 30 December 1813
- Predecessor: Karl Theodor Anton Maria von Dalberg
- Born: 3 September 1781; Paris, France
- Died: 21 February 1824 (aged 42); Munich, Bavaria
- Burial: St. Michael's Church, Munich
- Spouse: Princess Augusta of Bavaria (m. 1806)
- Issue: Josephine, Queen of Sweden; Eugénie, Princess of Hohenzollern-Hechingen; Auguste, Prince Consort of Portugal; Amélie, Empress of Brazil; Théodolinde, Countess Wilhelm of Württemberg; Princess Carolina; Maximilian, 3rd Duke of Leuchtenberg
- House: Beauharnais
- Father: Alexandre de Beauharnais; Napoleon I (adoptive)
- Mother: Joséphine Tascher de la Pagerie
- Military career
- Allegiance: French First Republic; First French Empire; Kingdom of Italy
- Rank: Général de brigade (France)
- Conflicts: See battles: French Revolutionary Wars; War in the Vendée; Italian campaign; Napoleonic Wars; War of the Third Coalition; War of the Fifth Coalition; Battle of Sacile; Battle of Caldiero (1809); Battle of Piave River; Battle of Tarvis; Battle of Raab; Battle of Wagram; French invasion of Russia; Battle of Borodino; Battle of Maloyaroslavets; Battle of Vyazma; Battle of Krasnoi; War of the Sixth Coalition; German campaign; Battle of Möckern; Italian campaign of 1813–1814; Battle of Caldiero; Battle of Mincio River; Siege of Venice (surrendered)

Eugène Rose de Beauharnais (French: [øʒɛn d(ə) boaʁnɛ]; 3 September 1781 – 21 February 1824) was a French statesman and military officer who served in the French Revolutionary and Napoleonic Wars. Through the second marriage of his mother, Joséphine de Beauharnais, he was the stepson of Napoleon Bonaparte. Under the French Empire, he also became Napoleon's adopted son (but not the heir to the imperial throne). Consequently, he signed his name "Eugène Napoléon". He was Viceroy of the Kingdom of Italy under his stepfather, from 1805 to 1814, and commanded the Army of Italy during the Napoleonic Wars. Historians consider him one of Napoleon's most able relatives.

== Family ==
Eugène Rose de Beauharnais was born in Paris on 3 September 1781 the son of Viscount Alexandre de Beauharnais and Marie-Josèphe Rose Tascher de la Pagerie (future empress Josephine), both born in the French colony of Martinique. Eugène's parents separated when he was three years old. At the age of five, Eugène was entrusted to his father's care and attended various boarding schools. His father served as a general during the early Revolutionary Wars. After losing the Siege of Mainz, he was imprisoned and executed by guillotine on 23 July 1794, a few days before the fall of Maximilien Robespierre and the end of the Reign of Terror.

== Early career ==
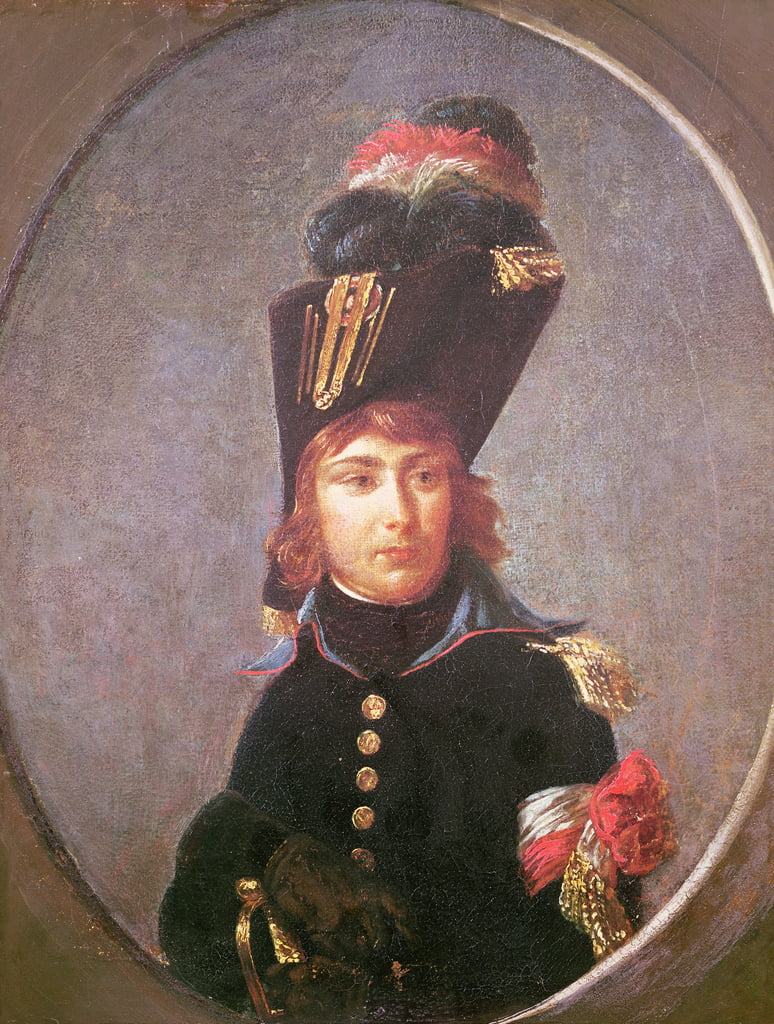
Eugène de Beauharnais as an aide-de-camp to Napoleon Bonaparte in Italy, by Antoine-Jean Gros (1798)

Eugène joined the French Revolutionary Army soon after his father's death and his mother's release from prison, initially serving as an orderly to General Lazare Hoche during the War in the Vendée. He returned to Paris on his mother's request "some time before the battle of Quiberon", according to his memoirs, and was sent back to school in order to complete his education. Neither he nor his sister Hortense was present when their mother married Napoleon Bonaparte.

After joining the 1st Hussar Regiment as an assistant sub-lieutenant on 30 June 1797, Eugène served as an aide-de-camp to his stepfather in the Italian campaign. After the Treaty of Campo Formio (17 October 1797) he was sent on missions to the Ionian Islands and Rome. In 1798, he followed Napoleon in his campaign in Egypt and Syria, where he took part in the Siege of Jaffa and was wounded during the Siege of Acre.

Eugène returned to France with Napoleon in the autumn of 1799, helping to bring about the reconciliation of the general and his mother, who had become estranged due to their mutual extramarital affairs. During the Coup of 18 Brumaire, he accompanied Napoleon to Saint-Cloud, where they brought the Council of Five Hundred into submission. When Napoleon became First Consul following the coup, Eugène was appointed captain of the chasseurs à cheval of the Consular Guard. He distinguished himself in the Guard's cavalry charges at Battle of Marengo, and was promoted to chef d'escadron. In 1803 he bought Hôtel Beauharnais.

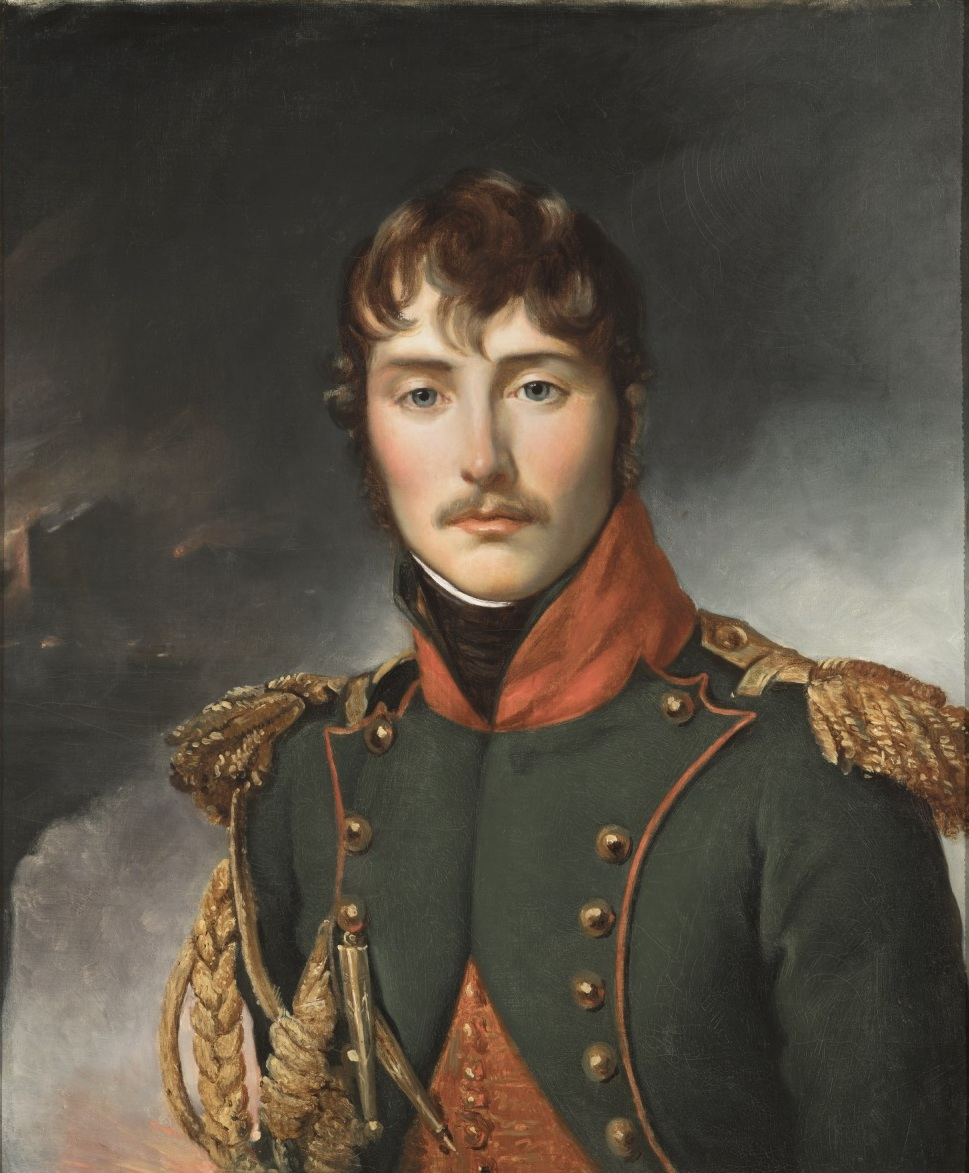
Eugène de Beauharnais as colonel of the Consular Guard's chasseurs à cheval, by François Gérard (c. 1802)

After rising through the ranks under the Consulate, Eugène was promoted to brigade general soon after the establishment of the Empire in 1804. By a decree of 1 February 1805, Eugène was created Arch-Chancellor of State and made a prince of France.

== Viceroy of Italy ==
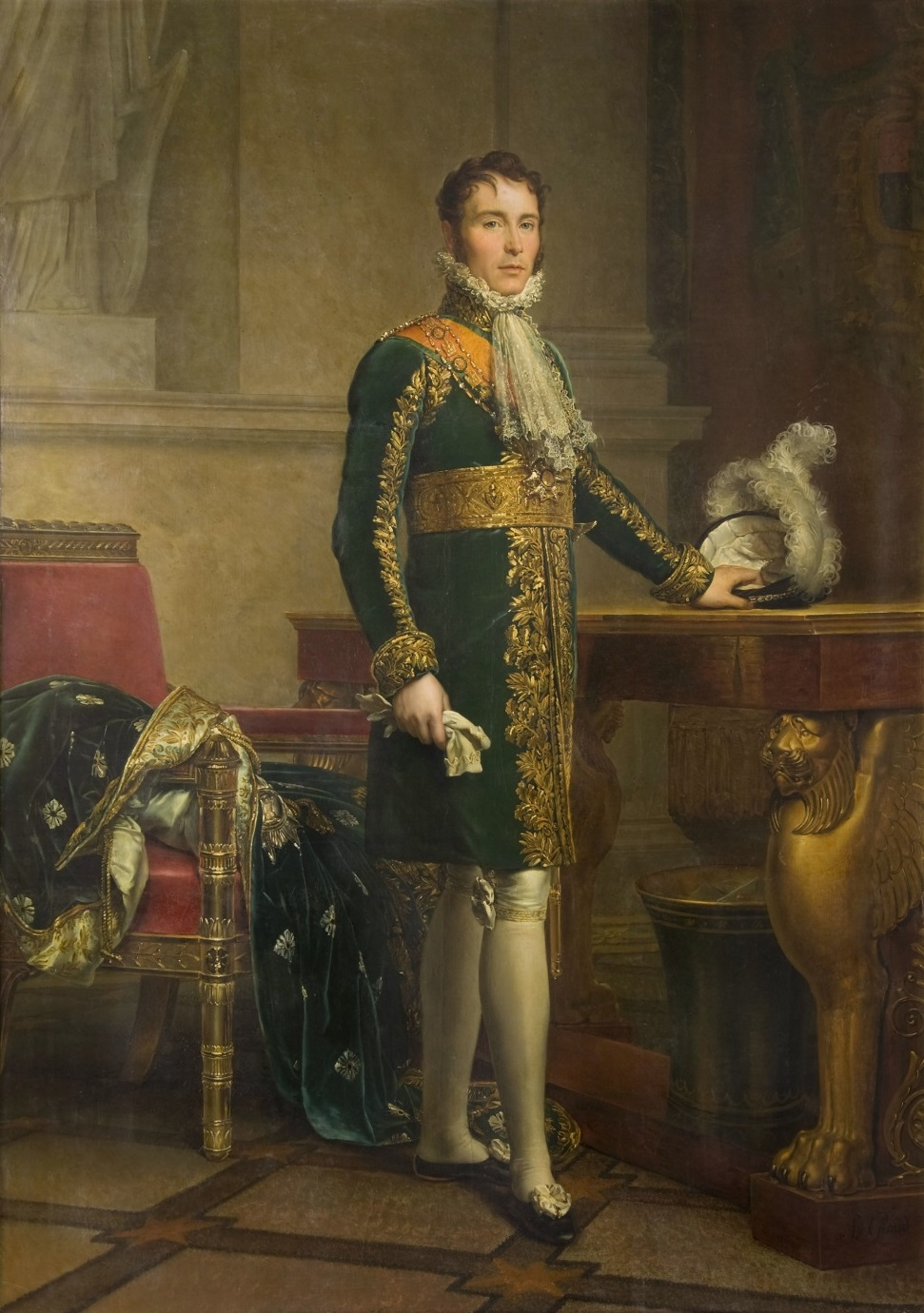
Eugène de Beauharnais as Viceroy of Italy, by François Gérard (1810–1811)

As commander of the Imperial Guard (successor to the Consular Guard), Eugène preceded his stepfather to Milan ahead of Napoleon's coronation as King of Italy on 26 May 1805. Napoleon had initially intended to place his brother Joseph on the Italian throne and then, after Joseph's refusal, his nephew Napoléon Charles, the son of Louis Bonaparte and Eugène's sister, Hortense. However, both Joseph and Louis refused, so Napoleon placed the Iron Crown upon his own head instead. During the coronation, Napoleon handed the royal ring and mantle to his stepson and on 7 June 1805 announced Eugène's appointment as Viceroy of Italy to the Italian Legislative Assembly.

In 1805, the War of the Third Coalition was to test Eugène's talents as an organizer, if not as a commander. While General André Masséna commanded the Army of Italy, Eugène raised a reserve army to guard the kingdom's southern border, after Naples broke its neutrality agreement with France. After the French victory at Austerlitz, Napoleon sought to strengthen Bavaria's alliance with France and arranged Eugène's marriage to Princess Augusta of Bavaria, daughter of King Maximilian I Joseph of Bavaria, breaking her engagement to Charles, Hereditary Prince of Baden. On 12 January 1806, Eugène was officially adopted by Napoleon. Though excluded from succession to the French Empire, on 16 February 1806, he was declared heir presumptive to the Italian throne, in the absence of a second son of Napoleon.

Over the following years, Eugène dedicated himself to the management of the Kingdom of Italy, showing himself to be an astute politician and administrator. He oversaw military works (fortification of Mantua, expansion of the Rocca d'Anfo), public works (construction of roads, restoration of the Venetian Arsenal, draining of the marshes around Verona), and the promulgation of the Napoleonic civil, commercial, and penal codes. After the kingdom annexed Marche from the dissolved Papal States, in April 1808, Eugène managed to keep relations with the Holy See from breaking down and rallied the populations of the annexed areas through economic benefits.

During the War of the Fifth Coalition, Eugène was put in command of the Army of Italy with some highly competent generals like Grenier, Charpentier, and the future marshal Étienne MacDonald accompanying him as advisers and officers. In April 1809, he fought and lost the Battle of Sacile against the Austrian army of Archduke John, but Eugène's troops won the rematch at the Battle of the Piave in May and the Battle of Raab in June. After the Battle of Aspern-Essling, Napoleon recalled the Army of Italy to Austria. After joining the main army on the island of Lobau in the Danube, Eugène took part in the Battle of Wagram.

Napoleon considered making Eugène regent of France during the invasion of Russia but ultimately decided against this. During the campaign, Eugène again commanded the Army of Italy (IV Corps), with a total force of 80,000 men. He fought at the battles of Ostrovno, Vitebsk, Smolensk, Borodino, Maloyaroslavets, Krasnoi, and the Berezina. After Napoleon and then Joachim Murat had left the retreating army in December 1812, Eugène took command of the remnants of the Grande Armée at Poznań. He led the retreat to Leipzig from January to May 1813, then served under Napoleon at the Battle of Lützen. Eugène then returned to Italy, where he set about reorganizing his troops and preparing the defence against the Austrian Empire.

Despite the defection of Murat's Kingdom of Naples in January 1814, and pressure from his Bavarian father-in-law, Eugène refused to defect to the Coalition, while also rejecting calls to leave behind his kingdom and join Napoleon in the defence of France. During the Italian Campaign of 1813-1814, he commanded a series of engagements in the Po Valley in order to slow down the enemy advance, which were in effect a series of organized retreats up to the river Adige. Despite some success against the Austrians at the Battle of the Mincio River on 8 February 1814, and successive victories against the Neapolitan Army, he was beaten at the rivers Taro and Nure. On 16 April, five days after Napoleon's abdication of both the French and Italian thrones, Eugène signed the Convention of Schiarino-Rizzino with the Austrian commander Heinrich von Bellegarde, bringing an end to hostilities. His attempt to be crowned King of Italy failed after an insurrection in Milan on 20 April, and Eugène finally relinquished control of the kingdom in the Convention of Mantua on 23 April.

== Later life ==
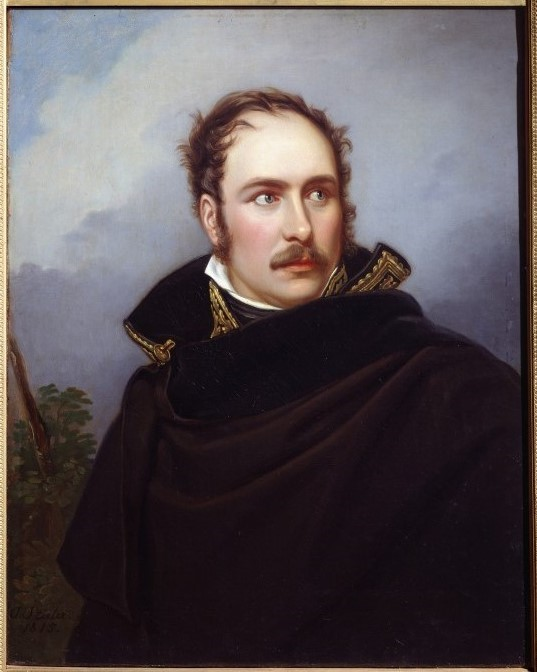
Portrait by Joseph Karl Stieler (1815)

After the fall of the Kingdom of Italy, Eugène retired to Munich in June 1814 at the behest of his father-in-law. He soon returned to Paris on the death of his mother, where he was honourably received by Louis XVIII and Alexander I of Russia. He immediately renounced his political activity and returned to his wife's family in Bavaria. Accordingly, he remained neutral during Napoleon's return to power in the Hundred Days.

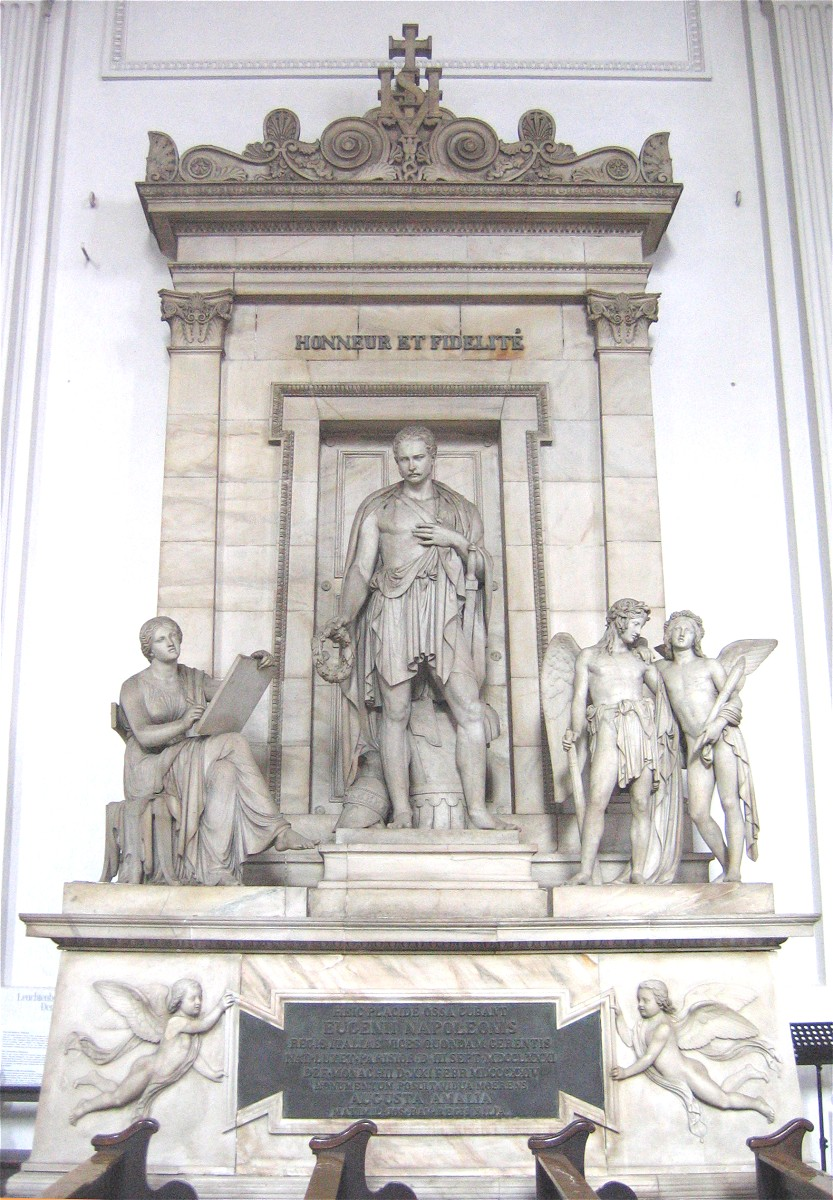
Tomb monument of Eugène de Beauharnais in St. Michael's Church, Munich, by Bertel Thorvaldsen

As Duke of Leuchtenberg, Eugène lived his last years in Munich, managing his estates and expanding his art collection. At the same time, he provided assistance for proscripts under the Bourbon Restoration, such as Antoine Marie Chamans de Lavalette, and lobbied for the alleviation of the harsh treatment imposed on Napoleon in his captivity in Saint-Helena. In 1822, Eugène's health began to deteriorate. After suffering two attacks of apoplexy in 1823, he died on 21 February 1824 in Munich, aged 42.

== Marriage and issue ==
On 14 January 1806, two days after his adoption by Napoleon, Eugène married Princess Augusta Amalia Ludovika Georgia of Bavaria (1788–1851), eldest daughter of Napoleon's ally, King Maximilian I Joseph of Bavaria. Although a diplomatic marriage, this union would turn out to be a happy one. On 14 November 1817, his father-in-law made him Duke of Leuchtenberg and Prince of Eichstätt, with the style Royal Highness.

Eugène and Augusta had seven children:

- Princess Joséphine Maximiliane Eugénie Napoléonne de Beauharnais (1807–1876); became the Queen Consort to King Oscar I of Sweden, who was the son of Napoleon's old love, Désirée Clary.
- Princess Eugénie Hortense Auguste de Beauharnais (1808–1847); married Friedrich, Prince of Hohenzollern-Hechingen.
- Prince Auguste Charles Eugène Napoléon de Beauharnais, 2nd Duke of Leuchtenberg (1810–1835); married Queen Maria II of Portugal.
- Princess Amélie Auguste Eugénie Napoléone de Beauharnais (31 July 1812 – 26 January 1873); was the second wife of Pedro I of Brazil and became Empress of Brazil.
- Princess Theodelinde Louise Eugénie Auguste Napoléone de Beauharnais (1814–1857); married Wilhelm, 1st Duke of Urach.
- Princess Carolina Clotilde de Beauharnais (1816)
- Prince Maximilian Josèphe Eugène Auguste Napoléon de Beauharnais (1817–1852); married Grand Duchess Maria Nikolaievna of Russia, eldest daughter of Tsar Nicholas I of Russia, and received the title of "Prince Romanovsky", addressed as "His Imperial Highness", in 1852.

== Roles and titles ==
On 20 December 1807, he was given the title of Prince de Venise ("Prince of Venice"), a title created on 30 March 1806, when the Venetian Province taken from Austria in 1805 was united to Bonaparte's Kingdom of Italy.

In 1810, Napoleon used his influence over Karl von Dalberg, the Archbishop of Regensburg and Grand Duke of Frankfurt, to name Eugène as the constitutional heir to the grand duchy. Von Dalberg abdicated on 26 October 1813 due to Frankfurt's imminent conquest by the allied armies, and Eugène became nominal grand duke until Frankfurt was occupied by the allies in December of that same year.

A further imperial sinecure was Archichancelier d'État de l'Empire de France ("Archchancellor of State of the Empire of France").

His name is inscribed on Column 24 of the Southern Pillar of the Arc du Triomphe, reading BEAUHARNAIS.

== Heraldry ==
Monogram of Eugène de Beauharnais

Coat of arms as
French Prince

Coat of arms as
Viceroy of Italy

Coat of arms as
Duke of Leuchtenberg

Eugène de Beauharnais House of Beauharnais Born: 3 September 1781 Died: 21 February 1824
German nobility
New title	Duke of Leuchtenberg; Prince of Eichstätt; 14 November 1817 – 21 February 1824	Succeeded by Auguste de Beauharnais
