= Monaco succession crisis of 1918 =

A succession crisis arose in the Principality of Monaco in 1918 because France objected to the prospect of a German national inheriting the Monegasque throne. Prince Albert I had only one legitimate child, the Hereditary Prince Louis, then heir apparent to the principality. As World War I drew to a close, Prince Louis, at the age of forty-eight, remained without legitimate issue, unmarried, and unbetrothed.

== Dynastic dilemma ==
Louis' nearest legitimate next of kin was Prince Albert I's first cousin Wilhelm, 2nd Duke of Urach (1864–1928). He was born in Monaco in 1864, and was largely raised there as a Francophone Catholic by his mother after her widowhood in 1869. He was educated at the former Jesuit School until 1882. He was, however, a Württemberg national, and his adult domicile and main assets (including Lichtenstein Castle) were in Württemberg. Although he was awarded the Grand Cross of Monaco's Order of Saint-Charles and was a knight of the Sovereign Military Order of Malta, he also was awarded much later the Grand Cross of the Order of the Crown of Württemberg and was a knight of Kaiser Wilhelm II's Order of the Black Eagle. In 1871, Württemberg became a part of the German Empire. Wilhelm joined the Württemberg army in 1882, and by 1911 this coloured the status of his claim to Monaco.

His father Wilhelm, 1st Duke of Urach, had many connections to France before his marriage in 1863 to Princess Florestine. His first wife, Théodolinde de Beauharnais, was a grand-daughter of Empress Joséphine, Napoléon’s first wife. His cousin Catharina had married Jérôme Bonaparte, and their son Prince Napoléon Bonaparte was a senior adviser in the Second French Empire at the time of Princess Florestine’s marriage. Another cousin, Alexander, had married a daughter of Louis Philippe I in 1837. In turn, Wilhelm the 2nd Duke’s wife Duchess Amalie was descended through her mother from Louis XV. So there was no cultural or dynastic aspect in the von Urachs’ past that was anti-French, rather the opposite; but this meant nothing in the climate of Revanche between the French Third Republic and the new Imperial Germany.

The 2nd Duke, a descendant through a morganatic marriage of the royal family of Württemberg, was the elder son of Albert's aunt, Princess Florestine of Monaco. Although he was ineligible to inherit the crown of his patrilineal ancestors in Germany, given the line of succession to the Monegasque throne at that time, there was every likelihood that the principality would pass by lawful inheritance into Wilhelm's "German hands" upon the death of Prince Louis. However, given the bitter relations between France and Germany at that time – a socio-political legacy of the Franco-Prussian War of 1870–71 and then of World War I – France deemed it unacceptable for a country over which it had exercised de facto or de jure hegemony, intermittently since the 17th century and consistently for half a century, to fall into the hands of a German aristocrat.

Moreover, while the House of Grimaldi had close ties to France due not only to geographical proximity, but also to possession of estates (vaster by far than the territory of the principality) and financial investments there, nothing officially prevented the dynasty's political or cultural associations from focusing elsewhere. Moreover, the hereditary principle allocated monarchies according to one form or another of proximity of blood, and the Grimaldis' hitherto exclusive control of Monaco's dynastic marital policy was what threatened to enthrone a German duke on France's border, even after the Empire's defeat in war. Just as the ruling families of Britain, Russia, Belgium, and the Netherlands had all become patrilineally German by the twentieth century due to the propensity of monarchical heiresses, seeking dynastically equal marriages, to choose husbands from among Germany's many minor princely families, Monaco was on the verge of the same fate. Although the Grimaldis did not require inter-marriage with royalty by law as German dynasties typically did, by custom they never married subjects of their own realm, and no Monégasque reigning prince or heir had wed a French consort in more than a century.

By 1910, France also worried that Monaco might become a future U-boat base only 150 km from the important French naval base at Toulon. Louis had served in the French army for most of his life, and was a brigadier general by 1918. In contrast, Wilhelm had joined the XIII (Royal Württemberg) Corps in 1890, and had commanded the German 26th Division in 1914–17.

The "crisis" therefore hinged upon Monaco's legitimate order of succession on the one hand, and France's security policy on the other.

== Constitution of Monaco, 1911 ==
In 1910–11, the peaceful Monegasque Revolution protests resulted in the Constitution of Monaco. This led to the end of absolutism, at least on paper, and also as a part of the overall resolution the Duke of Urach's claim was relegated behind that of Albert's newly recognised granddaughter Charlotte Louvet (see below).

== No sovereign: no sovereignty ==
The solution was an unequal treaty between France and Monaco which formalized and rendered permanent the latter's position as a client state: Not only did it require Monaco to conduct its foreign relations in consultation with or through France, but it obliged the dynasty to obtain French authorization for marital alliances or changes in succession, and declared that should the throne become vacant Monaco would become an official protectorate under French jurisdiction – while retaining nominal independence.

== Birth and recognition of Charlotte ==
Louis, while serving in the French army, befriended the laundress of his regiment, who asked him to look after her daughter, Marie Juliette Louvet. Subsequently, Louis and Marie had a daughter out-of-wedlock, Charlotte Louvet, who remained in the custody of her mother during her minority. Nonetheless, Louis recognised her as his child in 1900.

A Monégasque ordinance of 15 May 1911 acknowledged the child as Louis' daughter, and admitted her into the Grimaldi dynasty. However this was discovered to be in procedural violation of the statutes of 1882. The ordinance was therefore invalid, and the sovereign prince was so notified by the National Council of Monaco in 1918. As a consequence, an amendment of 30 October 1918 modified the law to allow the reigning prince or, with the monarch's consent, the Hereditary Prince of Monaco (the heir apparent or heir presumptive, whether a child of the reigning prince or not), to adopt a child, from within or without the princely dynasty, in the absence of legitimate issue of his own. The law stipulated that the adopted child would fully inherit all the rights, titles and prerogatives of the person who adopted him, including succession rights to the crown. The amendment also provided that, should the prince have legitimate issue after such an adoption, the adopted child would follow such issue in the order of succession. Another ordinance of 31 October 1918 stated the conditions for an adoption.

== French treaty of 1918 ==
While the adoption process was underway, and given the failures of the German spring offensive and the Second Battle of the Marne, France persuaded Prince Albert to sign a restrictive treaty in Paris on 17 July 1918. Article 2 stipulated that the accession of future princes of Monaco was to be subject to French approval, thereby limiting Monaco's sovereignty: "Measures concerning the international relations of the Principality shall always be the subject of prior consultations between the Government of the Principality and the French Government. The same shall apply to measures concerning directly or indirectly the exercise of a regency or succession to the throne, which shall, whether by marriage or adoption or otherwise, pass only to a person who is of French or Monégasque nationality and is approved by the French Government."

== Charlotte's adoption and status as heir presumptive ==
Charlotte was formally adopted by her own father Louis at the Monégasque embassy in Paris on 16 May 1919, in the presence of her grandfather Albert I, the French president Poincaré, and the mayor of Monaco. There is a doubt on the legality of the adoption. The Monégasque civil code (articles 240 and 243) required that the adopting party be of at least age fifty and the adoptee of at least age twenty-one. The 1918 ordinance changed the adoptee's minimum age to eighteen (Charlotte was twenty at the time of adoption) but not the other age limit, Prince Louis then being only aged forty-eight.

Charlotte was created Duchess of Valentinois by Albert I on 20 May 1919, and on 1 August 1922, following Louis II's accession on 26 June of that year, she was officially designated the Hereditary Princess of Monaco as her father's heiress presumptive. In 1920 she married comte Pierre de Polignac, who belonged to a junior branch of a prominent French ducal family. Prior to the wedding, a Monégasque ordinance of 18 March 1920 had changed Pierre's name and coat of arms to those of Grimaldi. On 20 March, he was allowed to take the title of Duke of Valentinois (his French prefix of comte was, in fact, a courtesy title). Princess Charlotte, Duchess of Valentinois and Pierre Grimaldi had a daughter, Princess Antoinette, baroness de Massy, and then a son, Rainier, marquis des Baux.

Duke Wilhelm von Urach, along with the other adult descendants of Princess Florestine, discussed renouncing their dynastic rights in 1924 in favour of a French cousin, Léonor Guigues de Moreton, comte de Chabrillan, who was descended from Prince Joseph of Monaco. The count was a more remote, female-line descendant of the Grimaldi dynasty, and was next in line to the Monégasque throne after the Urachs according to the pre-1920 order of succession. However, this renunciation was never formalised. Thus, the duke considered withdrawing as a claimant to Monaco's throne (he had also been considered for the thrones of Lithuania and Alsace-Lorraine, although these monarchical opportunities never materialized), he did not choose to recognize Monaco's selected heir – perhaps unsurprisingly, since the 1918 law and treaty directly intruded upon his hereditary rights, excluding him from a throne for no personal act of dereliction on his part, and without compensation (cf. Prince Ingolf of Denmark).

Despite the changed political reality, on the deaths of Wilhelm in 1928 and of his brother Karl in 1925 the official Journal de Monaco expressed grief at their deaths, and detailed their funerals in Germany and the memorial services held for them in Monaco. Prince Louis sent senior officials to represent him at both of his uncles' funerals in Stuttgart.

== Renewal of claim in 1930 ==
In 1930 the Chicago Daily Tribune reported that Wilhelm's third son Prince Albrecht had met with French officials in Paris, hoping to be approved by them as Louis' heir. 'He believes that the scandal surrounding Princess Charlotte's divorce "will help him win his case." He is now in Paris in "an attempt to make good his claim". ... The Urach branch of the family assert "that according to the Monaco constitution such an adoption becomes illegal until all members of the family approve it." The Urachs, a "German branch of the family," said they were never asked for their approval and "never approved of the adoption".'

Prince Albrecht could argue that his mother was descended from Louise Élisabeth of France, and so considering the Treaty of 1918 he was more French than his father, and had been educated in Paris. Evidently his claim was rebuffed.

== Renunciation by Charlotte ==
By a declaration of 30 May 1944 in Paris, Charlotte ceded her rights to the throne to her only son (with a reservation if he should pre-decease), and Rainier accepted in Paris on 1 June. An ordinance of 2 June 1944 acknowledged and confirmed the Sovereign Prince's assent to those declarations, and Rainier was made Hereditary Prince. When the Journal de Monaco published the ordinance on 22 June 1944, it added: "His Excellency the comte de Maleville, minister of Monaco in France, has been asked to inform the French government of this event, pursuant to the clauses of the treaty of 17 July 1918." The French government at the time was still the Vichy regime.

Louis II died on 9 May 1949. The Principality of Monaco passed to his grandson, Rainier III. In the absence of an heir male, the ducal titles of Valentinois and Estouteville became extinct in French nobiliary law. Before Rainier III married Grace Kelly in April 1956, he notified the French government of his plans; the French ministry of foreign affairs replied with a message of official congratulations.

== 21st century legal challenge ==
In 2018, Count Louis de Causans sued the French government for US$401 million alleging that France used a "sleight of hand" to deprive Duke Wilhelm II, his ancestor, of the Monegasque throne when it passed the 1911 law permitting Charlotte to be considered a Grimaldi. "A German reign over Monaco, on the eve of the First World War was simply unacceptable for France" said the count’s lawyer, Jean-Marc Descoubès. His initial lawsuit was dismissed because he did not prove his relation to Duke Wilhelm II. He filed an amended lawsuit in 2021 which included a report from a genealogist.
