= Wilhelm, Duke of Urach =

German duke (1810–1869)

Wilhelm
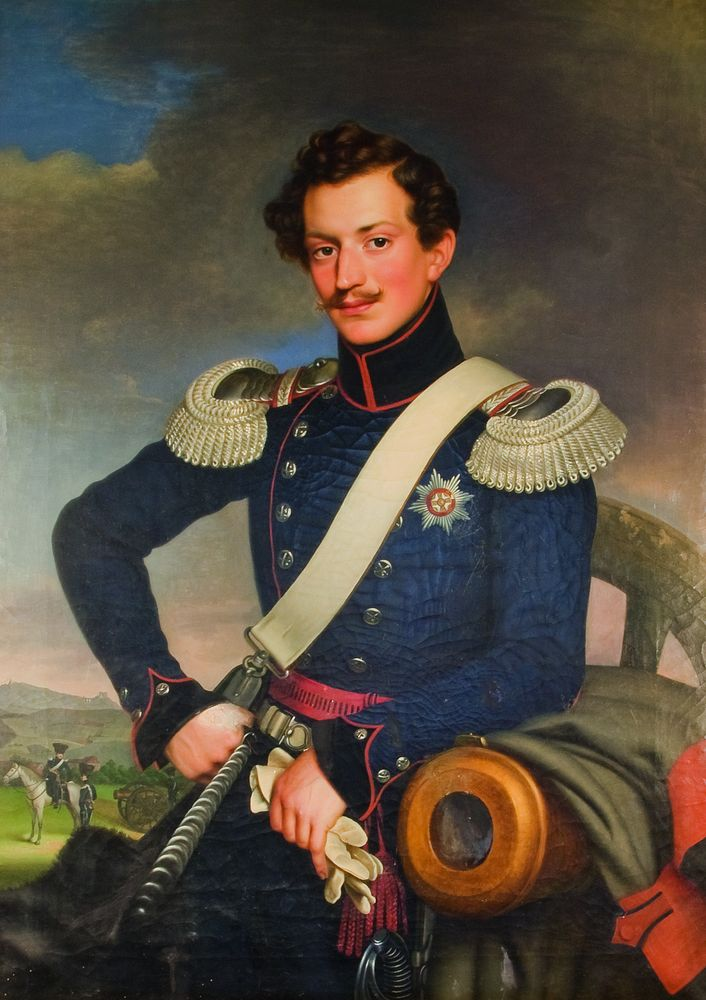
- 1835 portrait

Duke of Urach
- Reign: 28 March 1867 – 17 July 1869
- Born: 6 July 1810; Stuttgart
- Died: 17 July 1869 (aged 59); Lichtenstein Castle
- Burial: Ludwigsburg Palace Church
- Spouse: Théodolinde de Beauharnais (m. 1841; died 1857) Princess Florestine of Monaco (m. 1863)
- Issue: Princess Augusta Eugenie; Princess Marie Josephine; Princess Eugenia Amalie; Princess Mathilde Mindaugas II of Lithuania; Prince Karl
- House: Württemberg (birth); Urach (founder)
- Father: Duke Wilhelm of Württemberg
- Mother: Baroness Wilhelmine von Tunderfeldt-Rhodis

Count Friedrich Wilhelm Alexander Ferdinand of Württemberg, 1st Duke of Urach (6 July 1810 – 17 July 1869), was the son of Duke Wilhelm of Württemberg, younger brother of King Frederick I of Württemberg, and his morganatic wife, Baroness Wilhelmine von Tunderfeldt-Rhodis, whom he had married in 1800. He was the first Head of the House of Urach.

Wilhelm served as a cavalry officer in the army of the then-independent Kingdom of Württemberg. He also tested cannon for the Army of Württemberg, some of which can still be seen at Lichtenstein Castle, which he substantially rebuilt in the 1840s. He was inspired by the romantic historical novel Lichtenstein by Wilhelm Hauff (1826). Hauff was in turn inspired by the works of Walter Scott. He was created Duke of Urach on 28 March 1867, with the style of Serene Highness.

Wilhelm was a junior member of the royal family of Württemberg. He was the nephew of King Frederick, and was the first cousin of King William I of Württemberg (ruled 1816–1864).

== Public life ==
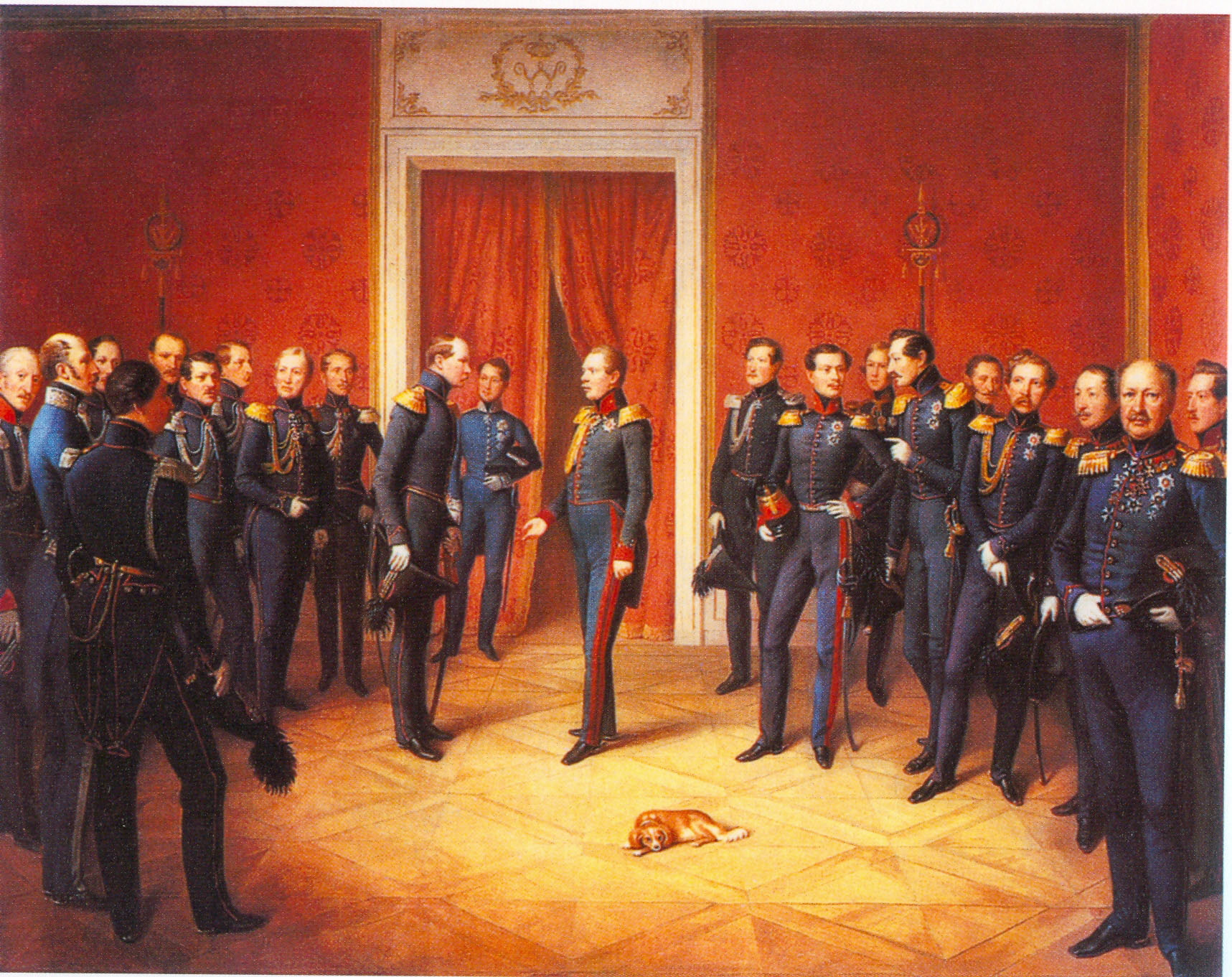
Reporting to King William I (1847), a group portrait. All the participants are identified on the painting's page at Wikimedia Commons.

Wilhelm was raised in the mentally stimulating parental home. From 1819 to 1823, William and his elder brother Alexander, who later became famous as a poet, stayed at the Fellenberg'sche Hofwyl Institute in Bern. Wilhelm returned to Stuttgart and was appointed Captain in the mounted artillery at the age of 18. In 1835, he was promoted to Major, and in 1837 to Colonel and commander of the artillery. In 1841, he was promoted to Major General and put in charge of an infantry brigade.

He can be seen in 1847, sixth from the right in "Reporting to King William I", a painting of William I of Württemberg and his advisers, by the court painter Franz Seraph Stirnbrand. He is talking with Crown Prince Charles, and the King is interviewing Prince Frederick.

In 1848 Württemberg contributed a field brigade to the combined division of the southern German states that marched into the First Schleswig War. The division was led by Lieutenant General Moriz von Miller; Wilhelm assumed command of the Württemberg brigade. After the Treaty of Malmö, the brigade was stationed at Altona and did not see any real action. Most of the brigade, including Wilhelm was then moved to Upper Baden, leaving one battalion in Schleswig. The brigade did observation work in Upper Baden, especially in the Constance district, but did not engage in any fighting.

Wilhelm was promoted to Lieutenant General in 1855. In 1857, he was appointed governor of Ulm. In 1841 he converted to Roman Catholicism to enable his first marriage to Théodolinde de Beauharnais. In 1867, he was promoted to General of the Infantry. On 28 May 1867, he was raised to Duke of Urach (Herzog von Urach), while retaining the dignity of Count of Württemberg.

Duke William's favorite weapon was the artillery. He was regarded as a mathematician and an officer of his weapon and made some inventions, especially with regards to the mounting of the guns. He tried to dampen the recoil of the gun by suspending the gun carriage in a movable frame. His very active and universally educated mind did not find enough activity in the military during the long period of peace.

== Historian ==
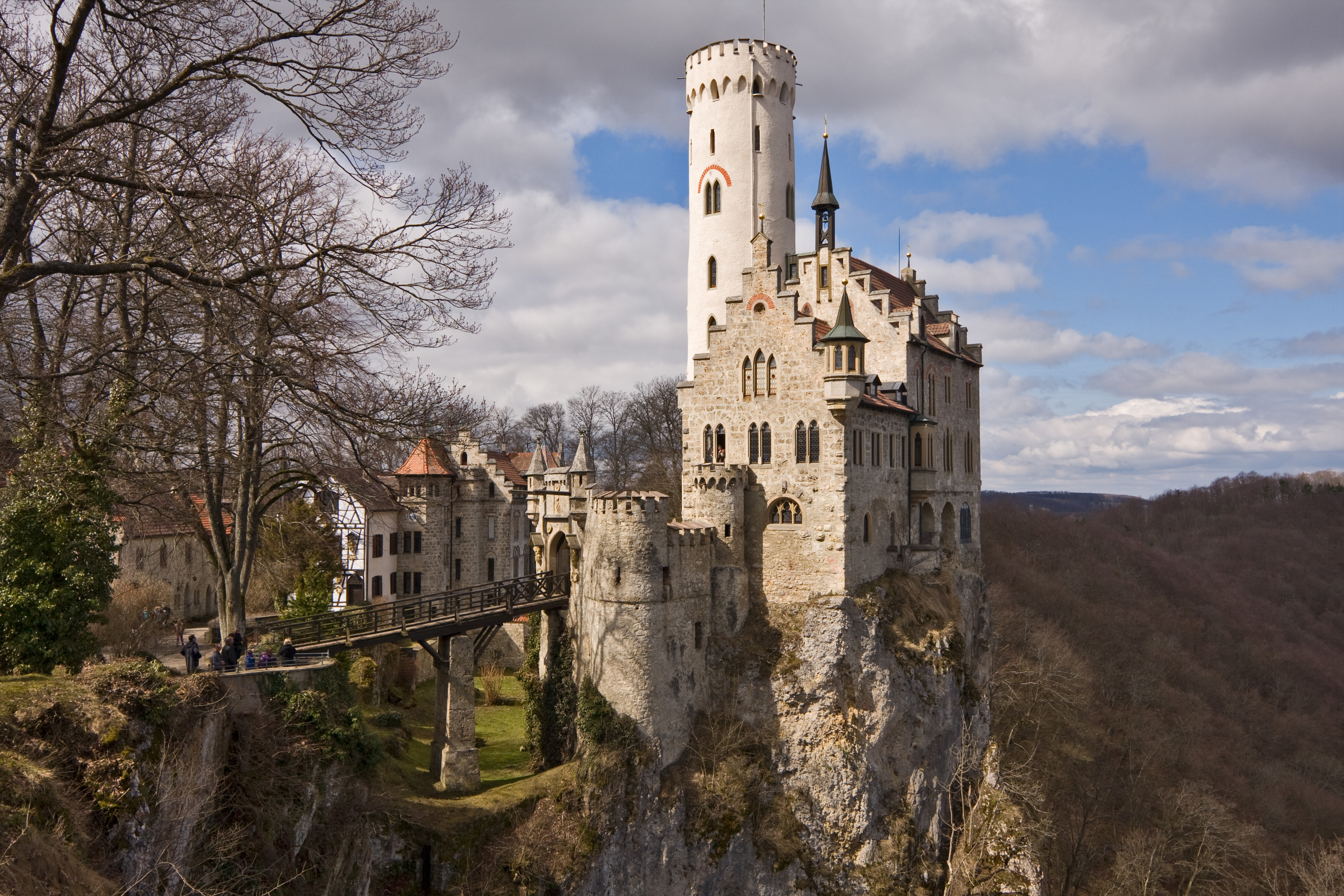
Lichtenstein Castle (Württemberg), reconstructed in 1840 by Wilhelm, 1st Duke of Urach

He was keenly interested in the arts and sciences, and in particular in art history and archeology. He made study trips and co-founded the württembergischen Altertumsverein (Württemberg Society for Ancient History) in 1843 and the Verein für vaterländische Naturkunde (Association for National Natural history) in 1844 and continued to support these. He also acted repeatedly as president of the overall association of German societies of Ancient History. His taste for art showed in 1840 and 1841, when he constructed Lichtenstein Castle on the spot of the by then completely ruined ancient castle made famous by Wilhelm Hauff's novel Lichtenstein. He moved a significant number of Renaissance style sculptures from the Neues Lusthaus in Stuttgart to Lichtenstein Castle when the Lusthaus was to be demolished in 1844, to make room for the Royal Court Theater. He was an honorary member of several scientific associations and learned societies, such as the Bavarian Academy of Sciences.

== Academia and literature ==
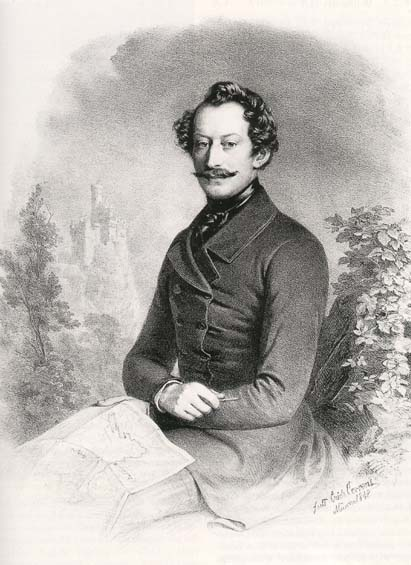
Duke Wilhelm in later years

In 1845, he received an honorary PhD from the philosophy department of the University of Tübingen, in recognition of his scientific endeavour. Among his literary works were Wegweiser durch sämtliche Malerschulen und Gemäldesammlungen von W. W. ("Guide to all schools of painting and art collections by W.W.") and Graphisch-archäologische Vergleichungen ("Graphical-archaeological comparisons") and the meteorological Aufklärende Worte über Wetterprophezeihung von W. W. ("Clarifying words about the prediction of the weather, by W.W."). His Politische Skizzen über Deutschland und Württemberg aus der Mappe eines Conservativen ("Political Sketches of Germany and Württemberg from the folder of a conservative") appeared anonymously in 1852.

In 1869 Duke Wilhelm suffered a stroke. He went to Bad Wildbad in the Black Forest in the hope that he might be healed by the southern climate. However, this was in vain. He died in 1869 at his Lichtenstein castle, from another stroke.

== Marriages and issue ==
- On 8 February 1841, Duke Wilhelm married Théodolinde de Beauharnais (Mantua, 13 April 1814 – Stuttgart, 1 April 1857), the daughter of Eugène de Beauharnais, Duke of Leuchtenberg. To contract the marriage he converted to Roman Catholicism. Four daughters were born from this marriage:
  - Princess Augusta of Urach (27 December 1842 – 11 March 1916); Married firstly Count Rudolf von Enzenberg zum Freyen und Jochelsthurn; secondly Count Franz von Thun und Hohenstein
  - Princess Marie Josephine (10 October 1844 – 13 January 1864)
  - Princess Eugenia Amalie (13 September 1848 – 26 November 1867)
  - Princess Mathilde (14 January 1854 – 13 July 1907); married Paolo Altieri, Prince of Viano.
- On 15 February 1863 in Monaco, he married Princess Florestine of Monaco (Fontenay, 22 October 1833 – Stuttgart, 24 April 1897), daughter of Florestan I, Prince of Monaco, and they had two sons:
  - Wilhelm, 2nd Duke of Urach (3 March 1864 – 24 March 1928), later King Mindaugas II of Lithuania.
  - Prince Karl (15 February 1865 – 5 December 1925), an Orientalist

An unexpected outcome of this marriage was the Monaco Succession Crisis of 1918.

== Ancestry ==
Ancestors of Wilhelm, Duke of Urach

8. Charles Alexander, Duke of Württemberg
4. Frederick II Eugene, Duke of Württemberg
9. Princess Maria Augusta of Thurn and Taxis
2. Duke William Frederick Philip of Württemberg
10. Frederick William, Margrave of Brandenburg-Schwedt
5. Margravine Friederike of Brandenburg-Schwedt
11. Princess Sophia Dorothea of Prussia
1. Wilhelm, Duke of Urach
12. Johan Christoph von Tunderfeldt-Rhodis
6. Baron Karl August Wilhelm von Tunderfeldt-Rhodis
13. Emerentia Dorothea Lew von Hohendorff
3. Baroness Wilhelmine von Tunderfeld-Rhodis
14. Baron Karl Friedrich Schilling von Canstatt
7. Baroness Therese Wilhelmine Henriette Schilling von Canstatt
15. Baroness Regina Luisa von Bernerdin zum Pernthurn

== Notes ==
Wilhelm, 1st Duke of Urach House of Württemberg Born: 6 July 1810 Died: 17 July 1869
German nobility
| Preceded by New title | Duke of Urach; 28 March 1867 – 17 July 1869 | Succeeded by Wilhelm Karl |
