= Princess Florestine of Monaco =

Duchess of Urach (1833–1897)

- Duchess of Urach
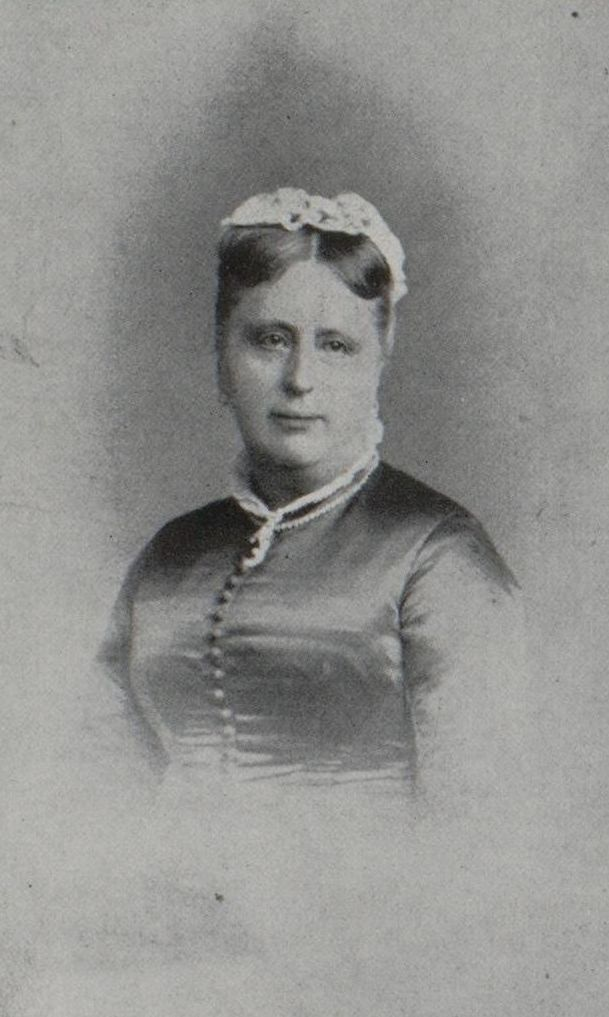
- Born: 22 October 1833; Fontenay-aux-Roses, France
- Died: 4 April 1897 (aged 63); Stuttgart, Württemberg, Germany
- Burial: Ludwigsburg Palace Church
- Spouse: Wilhelm, Duke of Urach (m. 1863; died 1869)
- Issue: Mindaugas II of Lithuania; Prince Karl
Names
- Florestine Gabrielle Antoinette Grimaldi
- House: Grimaldi
- Father: Florestan I, Prince of Monaco
- Mother: Maria Caroline Gibert de Lametz

Princess Florestine Gabrielle Antoinette of Monaco (22 October 1833 – 4 April 1897) was the younger child and only daughter of Florestan I, Prince of Monaco, and Maria Caroline Gibert de Lametz. She was a member of the House of Grimaldi and a Princess of Monaco by birth and a member of the House of Württemberg and Duchess consort of Urach and Countess of Württemberg through her marriage to Wilhelm, 1st Duke of Urach.

== Marriage and issue ==
Florestine married Count Wilhelm of Württemberg (later Wilhelm, 1st Duke of Urach), son of Duke Wilhelm of Württemberg and his morganatic wife Baroness Wilhelmine von Tunderfeldt-Rhodis, on 15 February 1863 in Monaco. Florestine and Wilhelm had two sons:

- Wilhelm Karl Florestan Gero Crescentius (1864–1928), Count of Württemberg, 2nd Duke of Urach, and nominally King of Lithuania as Mindaugas II of Lithuania

∞ 1892 Duchess Amalie in Bavaria (1865-1912), eldest daughter of the Duke Karl-Theodor in Bavaria
∞ 1924 Princess Wiltrud Alix Marie of Bavaria (1884-1975), sixth daughter of Ludwig III of Bavaria

- Josef Wilhelm Karl Florestan Gero Crescentius (1865–1925), Prince of Urach

Florestine's husband Wilhelm had converted to Roman Catholicism in 1841, for his first marriage to Théodolinde de Beauharnais, who died in 1857.

== Monaco Succession Crisis of 1918 ==
Florestine, according to the rules governing succession to the throne of Monaco, was able to marry without relinquishing her rights. When her grandnephew Louis II, Prince of Monaco, ascended to the Monegasque throne, Florestine's son Wilhelm claimed his rights for his succession to the princely throne of Monaco and the Grimaldi noble titles. However, France had undergone two wars against Germany and did not wish to see German princes ruling the Principality of Monaco. Therefore, France reached an agreement with the principality allowing the illegitimate daughter of Louis II, Charlotte, to be his heir presumptive to the princely throne and Grimaldi noble titles. Charlotte renounced and ceded her rights to the princely throne on 30 May 1944 to her son Rainier who became Rainier III, Prince of Monaco.

== Honours ==
- Württemberg: Dame of the Order of Olga, 1871 -
- Spain: Dame of the Order of Queen Maria Luisa

== Ancestry ==
Ancestors of Princess Florestine of Monaco

8. Honoré III, Prince of Monaco
4. Honoré IV, Prince of Monaco
9. Maria Caterina Brignole Sale
2. Florestan I, Prince of Monaco
10. Louis Marie d'Aumont, 6th Duke of Aumont
5. Louise Félicité d'Aumont, Duchess Mazarin
11. Louise Jeanne de Durfort, Duchess Mazarin
1.Princess Florestine of Monaco
12. Thomas Gibert
6. Charles-Thomas Gibert
13. Françoise Moret
3. Maria Caroline Gibert de Lametz
14. François Louis Michel Le Gras de Vaubercey
7. Marie Françoise Le Gras de Vaubercey
15. Gabrielle Françoise des Courtils
