= Frederick II Eugene of Württemberg =

Duke of Württemberg from 1795 to 1797

Frederick II Eugene
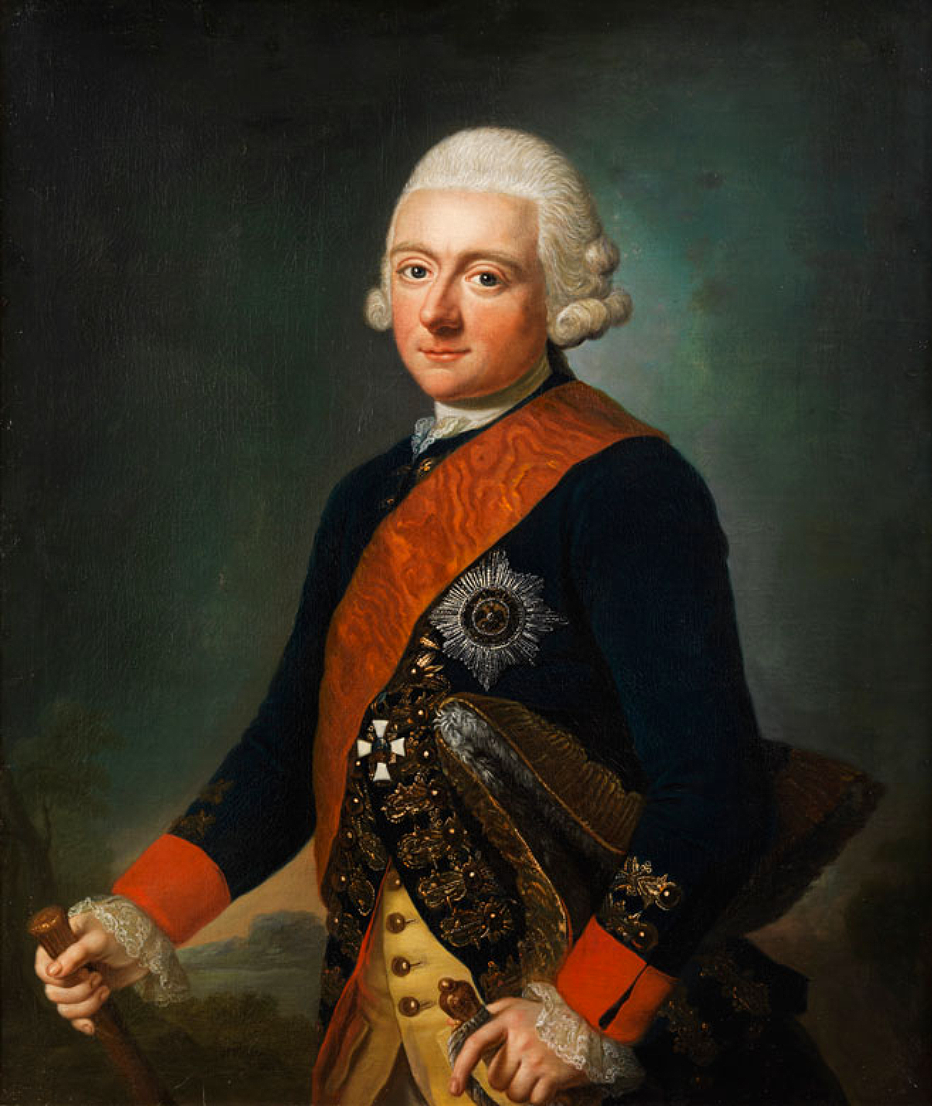
- Portrait by Antoine Pesne, 1750–1759

Duke of Württemberg
- Reign: 20 May 1795 – 23 December 1797
- Predecessor: Louis Eugene
- Successor: Frederick III
- Born: 21 January 1732; Stuttgart, Württemberg, Holy Roman Empire
- Died: 23 December 1797 (aged 65); Hohenheim, Württemberg, Holy Roman Empire
- Burial: Ludwigsburg Palace
- Spouse: Princess Frederica of Brandenburg-Schwedt (m. 1753)
- Issue: Frederick I, King of Württemberg; Duke Louis; Duke Eugene; Sophie Dorothea, Empress of Russia; Duke William Frederick Philip; Duke Ferdinand Frederick Augustus; Friederike, Princess of Holstein-Gottorp; Elisabeth, Archduchess of Austria; Duke Alexander
- House: Württemberg
- Father: Charles Alexander, Duke of Württemberg
- Mother: Princess Marie Auguste of Thurn and Taxis
- Religion: Roman Catholicism

Military service
- Battles/wars: Seven Years' War; Raid on Berlin; Third Siege of Kolberg

Friedrich Eugen, Duke of Württemberg (21 January 1732 – 23 December 1797) was the fourth son of Karl Alexander, Duke of Württemberg, and Princess Maria Augusta of Thurn and Taxis. He was born in Stuttgart. From 1795 until 1797, he was Duke of Württemberg.

== Early life ==
Frederick was born in Stuttgart on 21 January 1732, as the fourth son of Charles Alexander, Duke of Württemberg, and his wife, Princess Marie Auguste of Thurn and Taxis. As a younger son, he was not expected to succeed as Duke of Wurtemberg. Initially intended for the clergy, he instead joined the military and was appointed to several posts by King Frederick the Great of Prussia.

== Soldier ==
After serving with Frederick the Great during the Seven Years' War, he took up residence in 1769 at his family's exclave, the County of Montbéliard, of which he was also made lieutenant-general in March 1786 by his eldest brother, Charles Eugene, Duke of Württemberg, who had begun to come into the inheritance of portions of the County of Limpurg in the 1780s. He bought the castle and lordship of Hochberg in 1779, but re-sold it in 1791 to his brother. The next year he was named governor of the margraviate of Ansbach-Bayreuth by King Frederick William II of Prussia, to whom it had been sold by the last prince of that branch of the House of Hohenzollern. Montbéliard was taken over by the short-lived Rauracian Republic in 1792, then annexed by the French Republic in 1793.

== Duke ==
His elder brothers had only daughters, so following Charles Eugene's death in 1793 and then that of their brother Duke Ludwig Eugen (1731–1795), Frederick Eugene became reigning duke until his own death two years later. He acquiesced to the Treaty of Paris (7 August 1796) with revolutionary France, in which his claims to Montbéliard and all other territories on the left bank of the Rhine River were renounced. Frederick Eugene retained, however, France's recognition of the integrity of the Duchy of Württemberg itself.

== Marriage and children ==
Frederick Eugene married Friederike Sophia Dorothea of Brandenburg-Schwedt, a niece of Frederick the Great. Despite his Catholic faith, their marriage contract stipulated that the children would be raised by their mother in the Reformed faith. They had twelve children:

- Frederick I (6 November 1754 – 30 October 1816), his successor, who would later become the first King of Württemberg;
- Louis (30 August 1756 – 20 September 1817), commander of the Grand Duchy of Lithuania's army, married Polish princess Maria Anna Czartoryska and later Princess Henriette of Nassau-Weilburg;
- Eugene (21 November 1758 – 20 June 1822);
- Sophie Dorothea (25 October 1759 – 5 November 1828), married to Paul I, Emperor of Russia and became Empress Marie Feodorovna;
- William Frederick Philip (27 December 1761 – 10 August 1830); father of Wilhelm, 1st Duke of Urach;
- Ferdinand Frederick Augustus (22 October 1763 – 20 January 1834), married firstly Princess Albertine of Schwarzburg-Sondershausen (1771–1829) and secondly Princess Pauline von Metternich-Winneburg (1771–1855), elder sister of Klemens Wenzel, Prince von Metternich;
- Friederike Elisabeth Amalie (27 July 1765 – 24 November 1785), married to Peter I, Grand Duke of Oldenburg;
- Elisabeth Wilhelmine Luise (21 April 1767 – 18 February 1790), converted to Catholicism at fifteen and married to Archduke Francis of Austria in 1788, who would become Holy Roman Emperor after her death;
- Friederike Wilhelmine Katharina (3 June 1768 – 22 October 1768);
- Charles Frederick Henry (3 May 1770 – 22 August 1791);
- Alexander Frederick Charles (24 April 1771 – 4 July 1833), the founder of the fifth branch of Württemberg, to which today's head of the House, Duke Wilhelm of Württemberg, belongs;
- Charles Henry (3 July 1772 – 28 July 1838), married under the name "Count von Sontheim" in 1798 Christianne-Caroline Alexeï (1779–1853), who was created Baroness von Hochberg und Rottenburg in 1807 and was raised, along with her children, to the rank and title of Countess von Urach on 12 November 1825. Of their five daughters three died young, while Countess Marie von Urach (1802–1882) married Karl, Prince of Hohenlohe-Kirchberg (1780-1861) in 1821 and Countess Alexandrine von Urach (1803–1884) married Charles, Count Arpeau de Gallatin (1802–1877) in 1825, from whom she was divorced in 1843.

The duke died at Hohenheim on 23 December 1797, aged 65.

Frederick II Eugene of Württemberg House of Württemberg Born: 21 January 1732 Died: 23 December 1797
Regnal titles
| Preceded by Louis Eugene | Duke of Württemberg; 1795–1797 | Succeeded by Frederick III |
