= House of Württemberg =

German royal family and dynasty

- Coat of arms adopted by King William I of Württemberg in 1817
- Country: Württemberg
- Founded: 1081; 945 years ago
- Founder: Conrad I, Count of Württemberg
- Current head: Wilhelm, Duke of Württemberg
- Final ruler: William II of Württemberg
- Titles: Count of Württemberg; Duke of Württemberg; Elector of Württemberg; King of Württemberg; King of Lithuania; Count of Montbéliard
- Deposition: 1918; 108 years ago
- Cadet branches: Teck (extinct); Urach

The House of Württemberg is an ancient German dynasty and former royal family of the Kingdom of Württemberg.

== History ==
=== County ===
The House probably originated in the vicinity of the Salian dynasty. Around 1080 the ancestors of modern Württemberg, which was then called "Wirtemberg", settled in the Stuttgart area. Conrad of Württemberg became heir to the House of Beutelsbach and built the Wirtemberg Castle. Around 1089, he was made Count. Their domains, initially only the immediate surroundings of the castle included, increased steadily, mainly through acquisitions such as those from impoverished homes of Tübingen.

=== Duchy ===
At the Diet of Worms in 1495, Count Eberhard V was raised to Duke (Herzog) by the German King, later Holy Roman Emperor, Maximilian I. During 1534 to 1537 Duke Ulrich introduced the Protestant Reformation, and the country became Protestant. Duke Ulrich became head of the local Protestant Church.

In the 18th Century, the Protestant male line became extinct, the head of the house was succeeded by Duke Charles Alexander, a Roman Catholic. Despite having a Catholic royal family, Protestantism survived as the established church, run by a church council composed by members of the nobility of Württemberg. From 1797, with the accession of Duke Frederick II, the royal family was again Protestant.

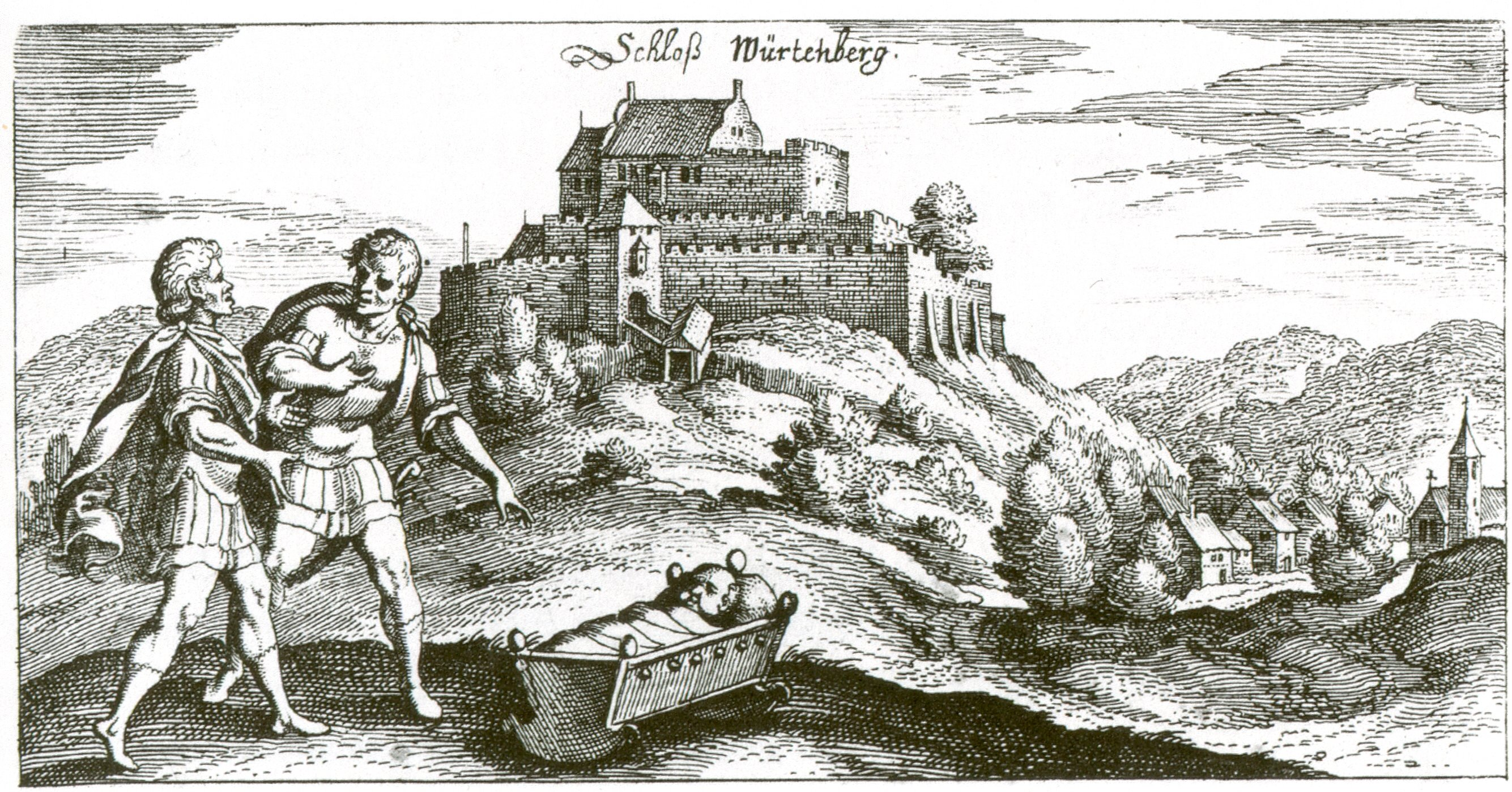
Wirtemberg Castle

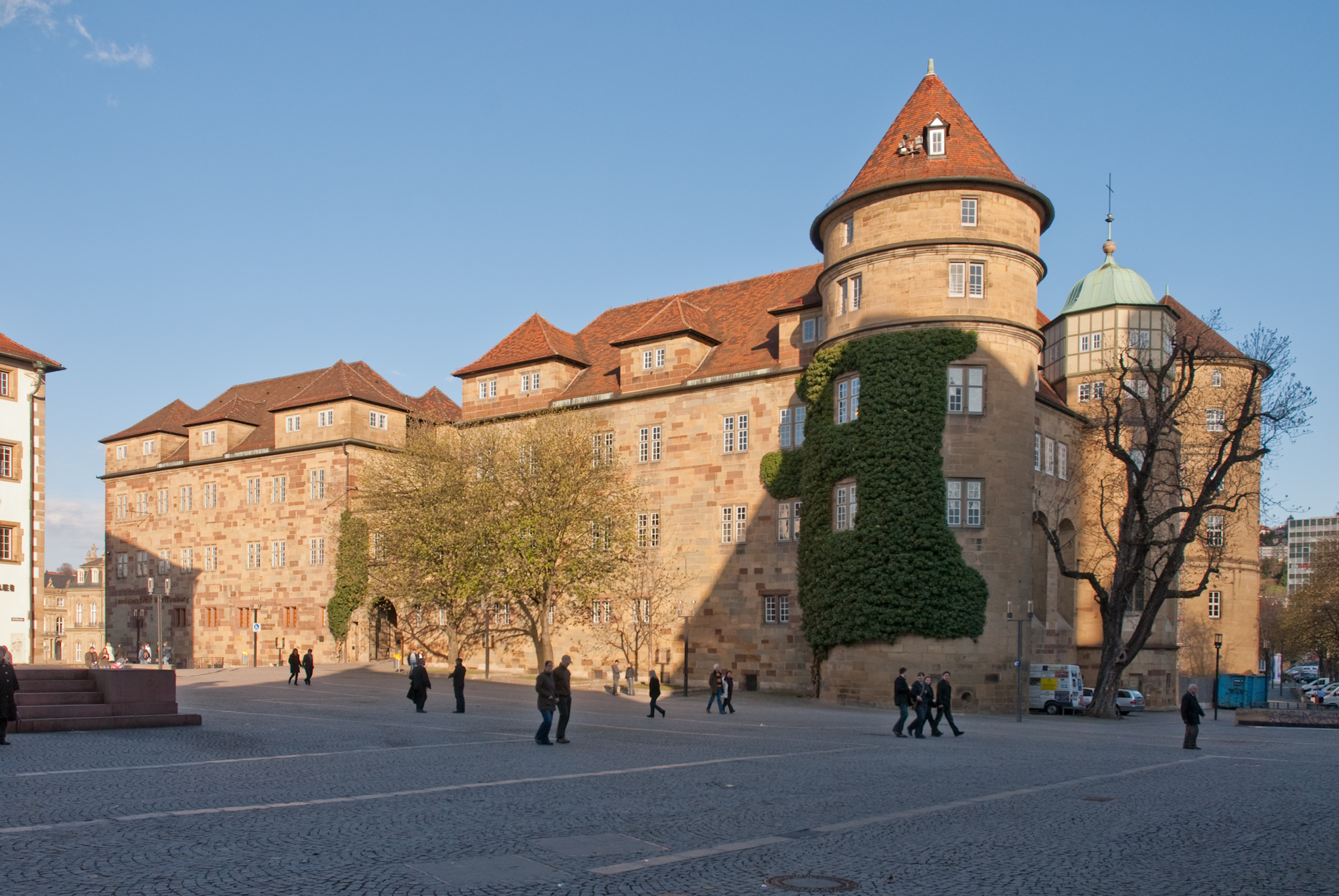
Old Castle (Stuttgart)

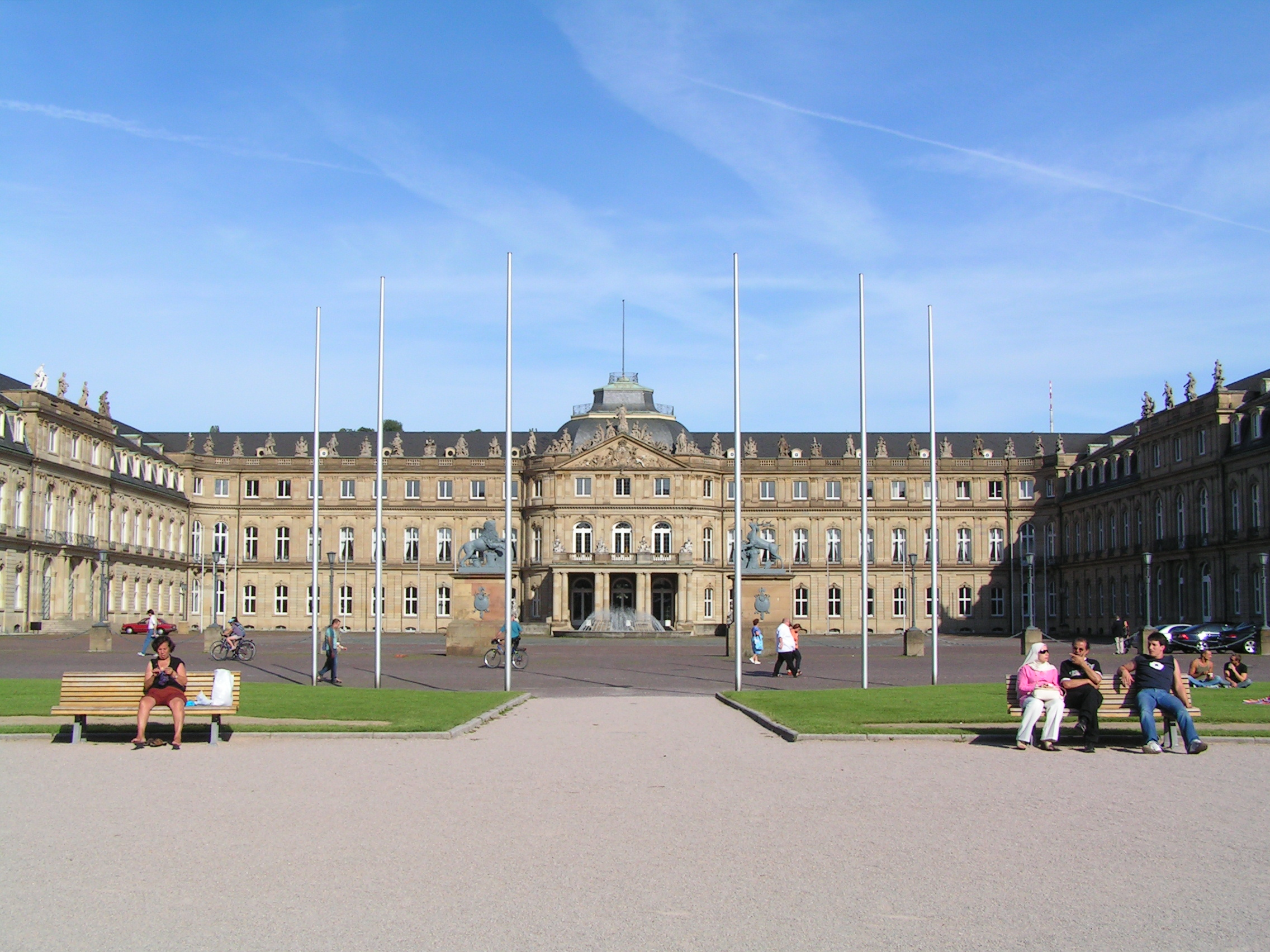
New Palace (Stuttgart)

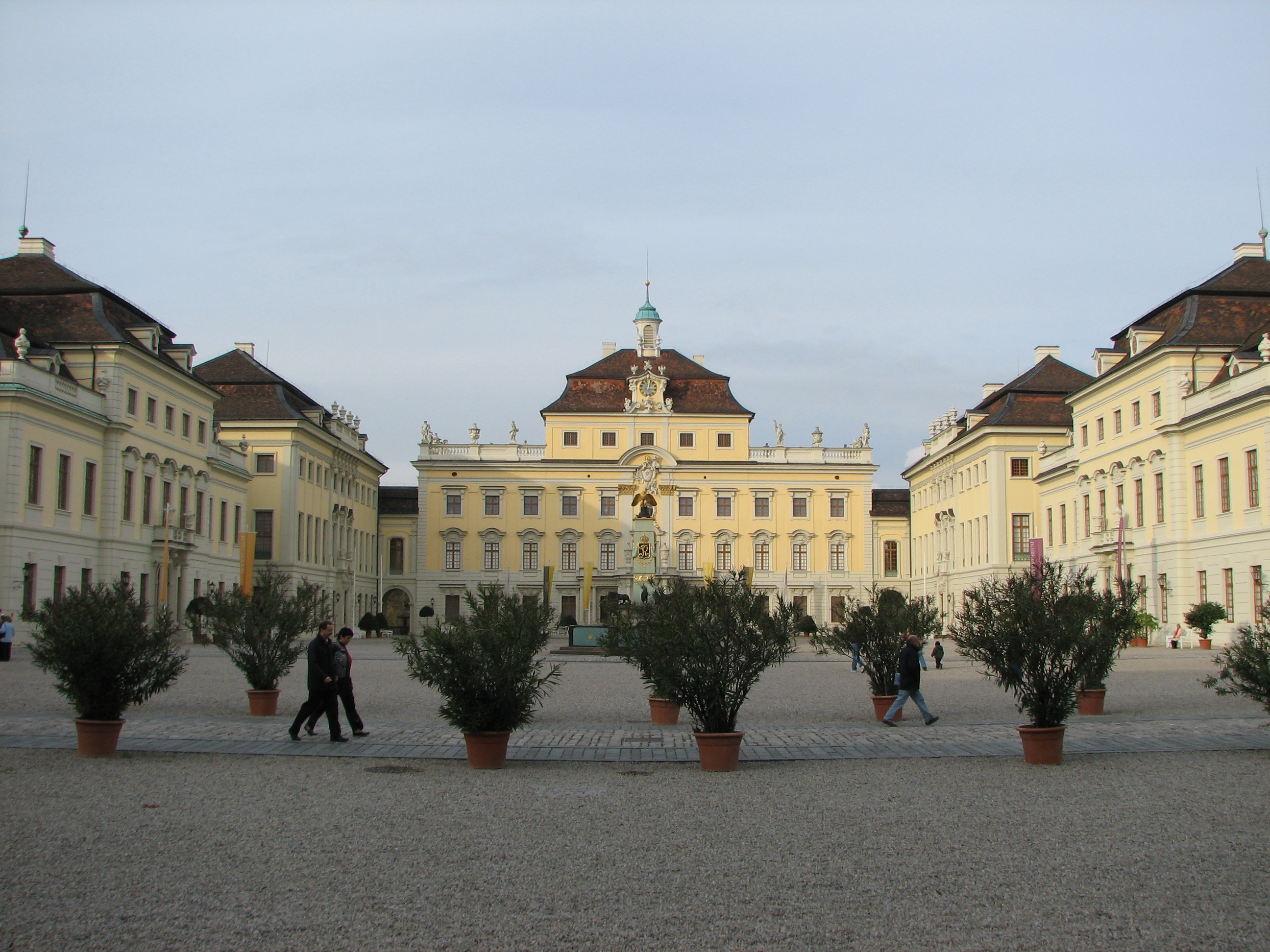
Ludwigsburg Palace

=== Kingdom ===
Due to the political upheavals during the reign of Napoleon I, and being an ally of Napoleon, Württemberg became a part of the Confederation of the Rhine, Duke Frederick II was made Elector in May 1803, he collected and received secularized and mediated dominions, which greatly enlarged his country in territorial extension. In January 1806 he assumed the title of King of Württemberg.

In 1828 King William I adopted a new house law, the rights and obligations of the ruling family have been established, including the exclusive primogeniture in the male line as well as marriage restrictions on coequal level.

In 1867 the House created the Royal Dukedom of Urach for a younger cousin, Prince Wilhelm, 1st Duke of Urach, whose parents had married morganatically in 1800, whereby their sons were excluded from ruling the kingdom. In 1871 the Royal Dukedom of Teck was created for the same dynastic reason for Francis, Duke of Teck.

At the end of World War I during the German Revolution all the monarchies in Germany were abolished, King William II abdicated on 30 November 1918. When former King William II died in 1921 the senior branch line of the House of Württemberg became extinct, the headship of the House passed to a distant relative, Albrecht, Duke of Württemberg.

=== Dynasty ===
The line of succession of the house of Württemberg has continued to the present, although the house no longer plays any political role.

Heads of the House of Württemberg since 1918

- King William II, 1918–1921.
- Duke Albrecht, 1921–1939.
- Duke Philipp, 1939–1975.
- Duke Carl, 1975–2022
- Duke Wilhelm, 2022–present

The former royal family still owns the castles Monrepos, Altshausen and Friedrichshafen.

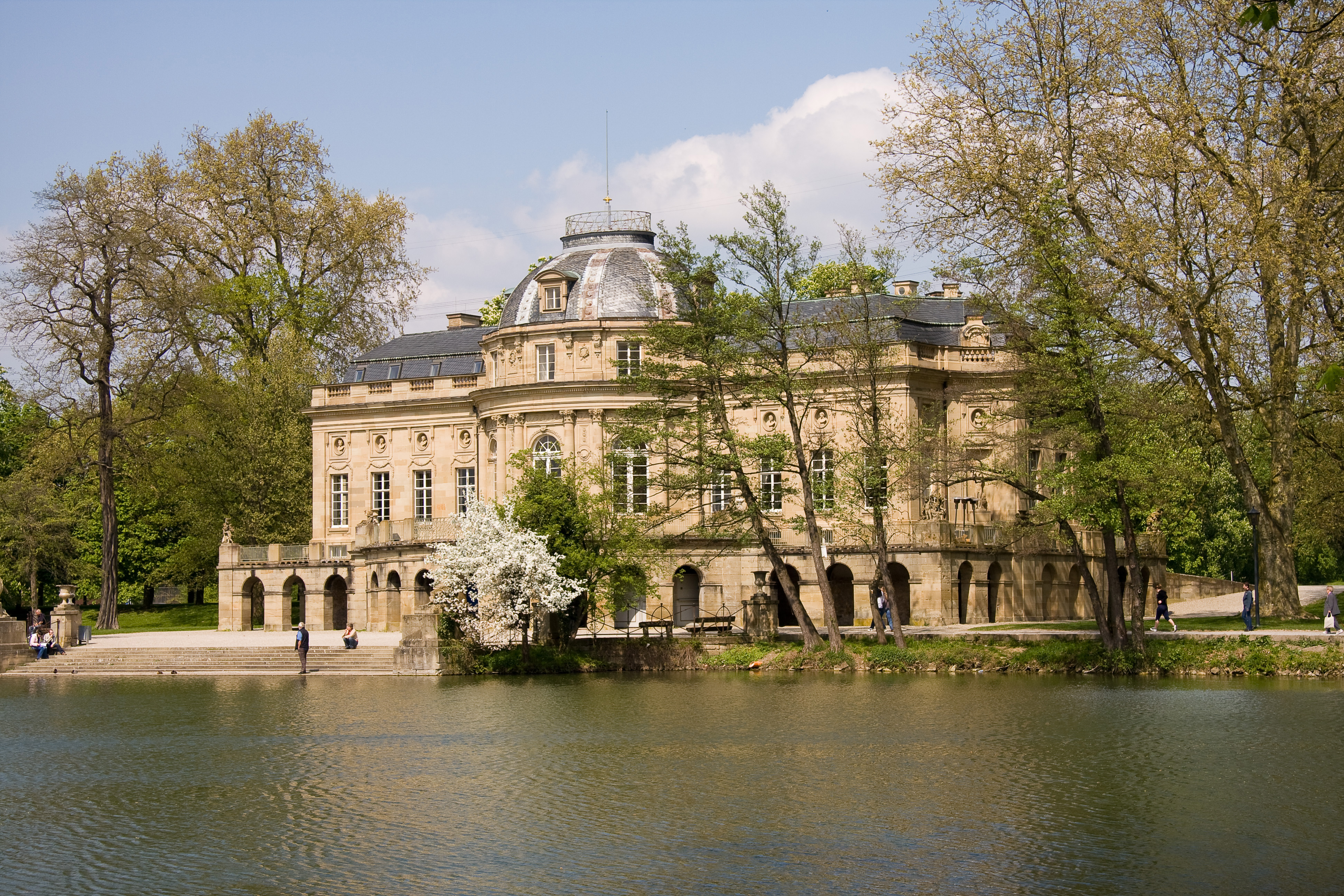
Monrepos, Ludwigsburg

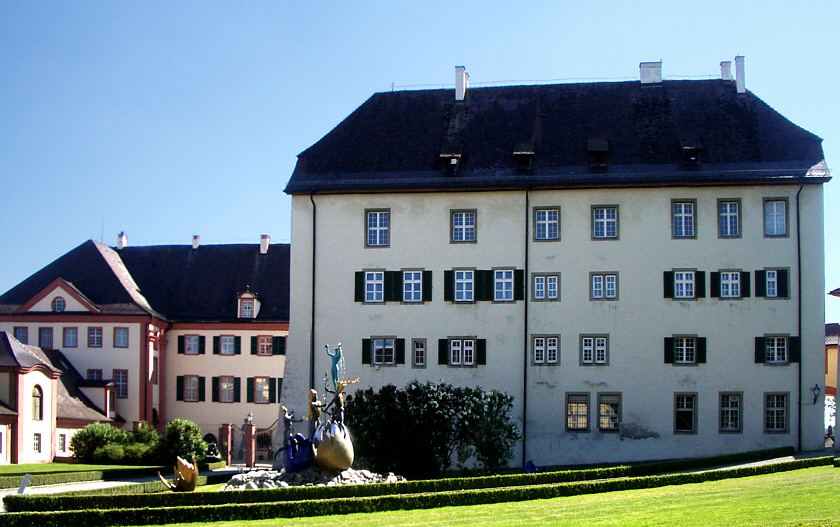
Altshausen Palace

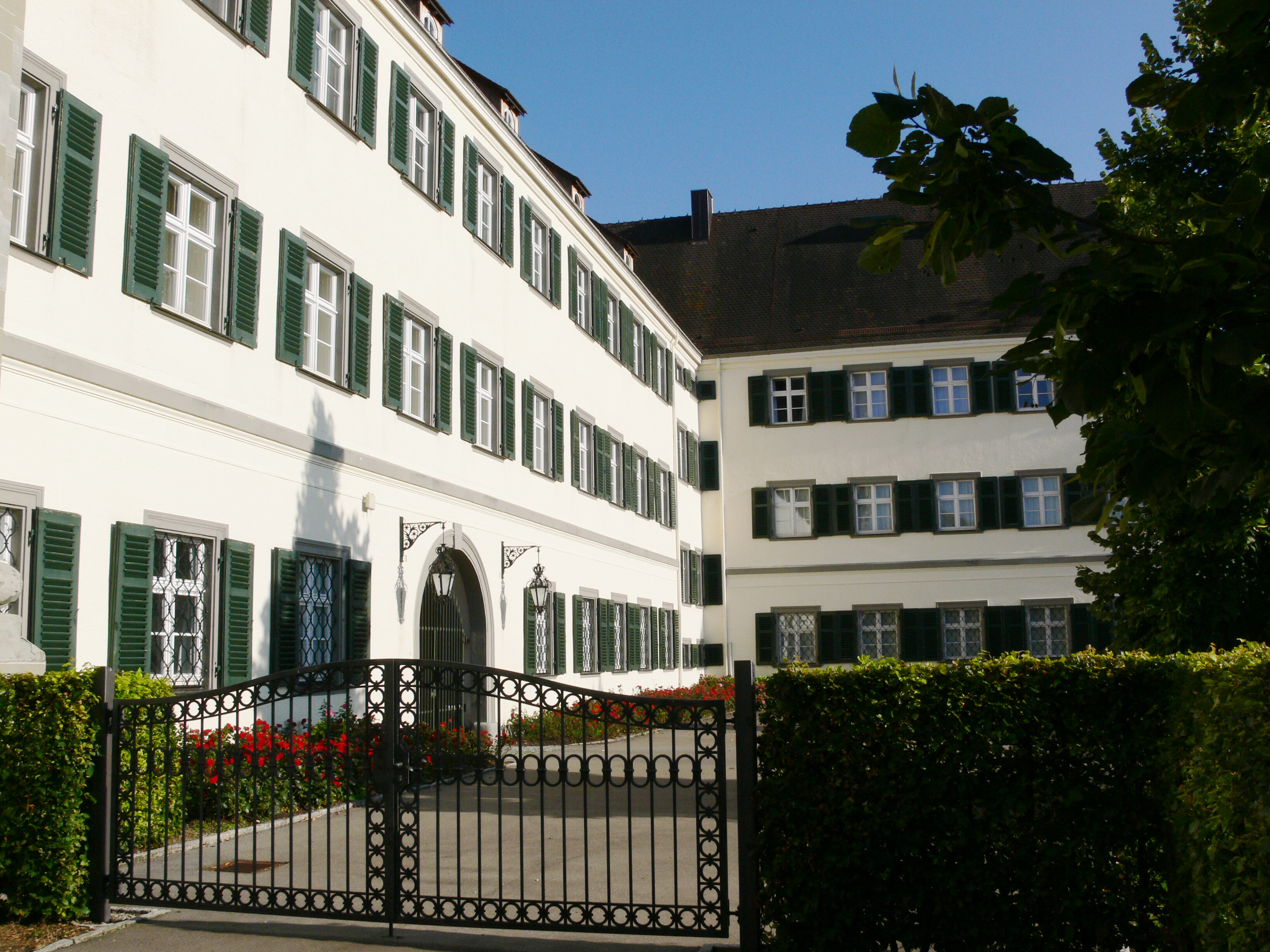
Friedrichshafen Castle

== Branches ==
All branches descend from Frederick II Eugene, Duke of Württemberg (1732–1797). Succession is on the basis of Agnatic primogeniture

- The first branch descends from Frederick I of Württemberg. This branch became extinct at the death of William II of Württemberg in 1921.
- The second branch descends from Duke Louis of Württemberg, and belonged to the Teck family. This branch became extinct at the death of George Cambridge, 2nd Marquess of Cambridge in 1981. It was not considered dynastic due to the morganatic marriage of Duke Alexander of Württemberg to Countess Claudine Rhédey von Kis-Rhéde. A cognatic descendant from this branch was Queen Elizabeth II of the United Kingdom.
- The third branch "Carlsruhe" descends from Duke Eugen of Württemberg. This branch became extinct at the death of Duke Nicholas of Württemberg in 1903.
- The fourth branch descends from Duke William Frederick Philip of Württemberg, and belongs to the Urach family. This branch is extant, but as the Teck branch, it is not considered dynastic because of the morganatic marriage of Duke William Frederick Philip to Baroness Wilhelmine von Tunderfedt-Rhodes in 1800. The first Duke was created a "Serene Highness" in the 1860s. The current head of this branch is Wilhelm Albert, Duke of Urach.
- The fifth "Altshausen" branch descends from Duke Alexander of Württemberg. The current pretender to the throne of Württemberg, Wilhelm, Duke of Württemberg belongs to this branch.

Through the marriages of its female members, many royal families descend from any of the Württemberg branches. Royal houses include: Bourbon, Liechtenstein, Orléans, Windsor, Wied-Neuwied, etc.

== See also ==
- Coat of arms of Württemberg
- History of Württemberg

== Notes and sources ==
- Robert Uhland (Hrsg.): 900 Jahre Haus Württemberg. Leben und Leistung für Land und Volk. Stuttgart 1984, ISBN 3-17-008536-0
- Gerhard Raff: Hie gut Wirtemberg allewege I. Das Haus Württemberg von Graf Ulrich dem Stifter bis Herzog Ludwig. Mit einer Einleitung von Hansmartin Decker-Hauff. Stuttgart 1988, ISBN 3-89850-110-8
- Gerhard Raff: Hie gut Wirtemberg allewege II. Das Haus Württemberg von Herzog Friedrich I. bis Herzog Friedrich III. Mit den Linien Stuttgart, Mömpelgard, Weiltingen, Neuenbürg, Neuenstadt am Kocher und Oels in Schlesien. Degerloch 1993, ISBN 3-89850-108-6
- Gerhard Raff: Hie gut Wirtemberg allewege III. Das Haus Württemberg von Herzog Wilhelm Ludwig bis Herzog Friedrich Karl. Mit den Linien Stuttgart, Winnental, Neuenstadt am Kocher, Neuenbürg, Mömpelgard und Oels, Bernstadt und Juliusburg in Schlesien und Weiltingen. Degerloch 2002, ISBN 3-89850-084-5
- Sönke Lorenz, Dieter Mertens, Volker Press (Hrsg.): Das Haus Württemberg. Ein biographisches Lexikon. Kohlhammer Verlag, Stuttgart 1997, ISBN 3-17-013605-4
- Harald Schukraft: Kleine Geschichte des Hauses Württemberg. Tübingen 2006, ISBN 3-87407-725-X
- Sabine Thomsen: Goldene Bräute. Württembergische Prinzessinnen auf europäischen Thronen, Silberberg Verlag, Tübingen 2010 ISBN 978-3-87407-867-2

— Royal house — House of Württemberg Founding year: 11th century
Württemberg established	Ruling House of Württemberg; 1081 – 30 November 1918	Vacant German monarchies abolished
