= Duke William Frederick Philip of Württemberg =

German duke (1761–1830)

William
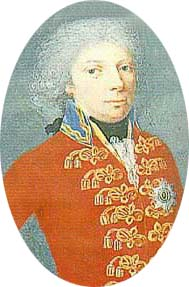
- Portrait, c. 1800
- Born: 27 December 1761; Stettin
- Died: 10 August 1830 (aged 68); Schloss von Stetten im Remstal
- Spouse: Wilhelmine von Tunderfeld-Rhodis (m. 1800; died 1822)
- Issue: Count Alexander; Count August; Wilhelm, Duke of Urach; Count Friedrich August; Count Franz; Marie, Countess Wilhelm of Taubenheim
Names
- William Frederick Philip
- House: Württemberg
- Father: Frederick II Eugene, Duke of Württemberg
- Mother: Margravine Sophia Dorothea of Brandenburg-Schwedt

Duke William Frederick Philip of Württemberg (27 December 1761, in Stettin – 10 August 1830, in Schloss von Stetten im Remstal) was a prince of the House of Württemberg and a minister for war.

== Early life ==
William was the fourth son of Frederick II Eugene, Duke of Württemberg and Sophia Dorothea of Brandenburg-Schwedt, eldest daughter of Frederick William, Margrave of Brandenburg-Schwedt and Princess Sophia Dorothea of Prussia, a niece of Frederick II of Prussia.

== Military career ==
In 1779 he joined the Royal Danish Army and quickly rose to the rank of Oberst. In 1781 he commanded his own regiment, being promoted to major general in 1783, moved to the Danish Foot Guards in 1785 and promoted to lieutenant general in 1795. In 1801 he became governor of Copenhagen and later the same year faced the Battle of Copenhagen in that role.

In 1806 he paid 10,000 Reichstaler to leave the Danish army. His brother Frederick had just been made king of Württemberg and in Stuttgart made William a field marshal and Württemberg's minister for war.

From 1810 to 1821 William temporarily lived in his manor house at Hirrlingen near Rottenburg but more often in the Schloss Stetten in Remstal. On 29 June 1811 he took on Freiherr Friedrich von Phull as vice-president of the War Department (and de facto Minister for War, though William remained minister de jure until 1815).

In 1815, on leaving office, William shifted to studying science and successfully practised as a physician. In 1817 the University of Tübingen awarded him an honorary degree in medicine.

As a member of the royal House of Württemberg, William also held a seat in the House of Lords (Kammer der Standesherren) of the Württembergische Landstände parliament from 1819 to his death in 1830.

== Marriage and issue ==
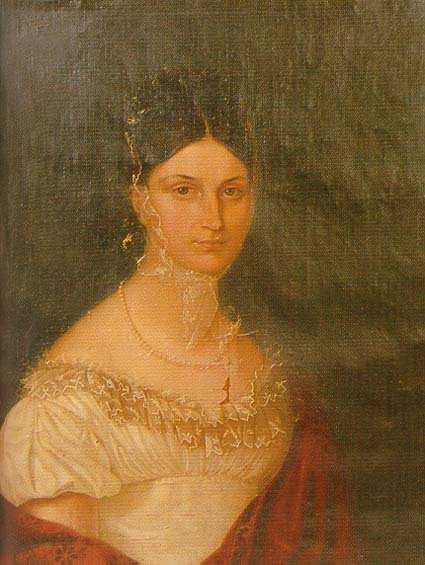
Wilhelmine Freiin von Tunderfeldt-Rhodis

On 23 August 1800, in Coswig, Frederick married one of his mother's ladies in waiting, Wilhelmine Freiin von Tunderfeldt-Rhodis, the daughter of Baron Karl August Wilhelm von Tunderfeldt-Rhodis and his wife, Therese Wilhelmine Henriette, Baroness Schilling von Cannstatt.

By birth, Wilhelmine was a member of an aristocratic military family from Sweden, originally belonging to the Baltic-German nobility.

The couple had six children, only three of whom reached adulthood:

- Count Alexander of Württemberg (1801–1844), poet; married Countess Helene Festetics von Tolna (1812–1886), daughter of Count Ladislas Festetics von Tolna (1785-1846) and his wife, Princess Josephine Maria von Hohenzollern-Hechingen (1791-1856).
- Count August of Württemberg (1805–1808)
- Wilhelm, Duke of Urach, Count of Württemberg (1810–1869); married firstly Princess Théodolinde of Leuchtenberg (1814–1857). He married secondly Princess Florestine of Monaco (1833–1897) and had issue from both marriages.
- Count Friedrich August of Württemberg (1811–1812)
- Count Franz of Württemberg (1814–1824)
- Countess Marie of Württemberg (1815–1866); married Count Wilhelm von Taubenheim (1805–1894) and had issue - three daughters and one son.

Since this was a morganatic marriage, on 1 August 1801 William renounced his descendants' claim to the throne of Württemberg. This had an effect in 1921, on the death of William II of Württemberg, when his descendants were excluded from inheriting. However, by then the Kingdom of Württemberg had itself been superseded.

== Ancestry ==
Ancestors of Duke William Frederick Philip of Württemberg

16. Eberhard III, Duke of Württemberg
8. Frederick Charles, Duke of Württemberg-Winnental
17. Wild- and Rhinegravine Anna Dorothea von Salm-Kyrburg
4. Charles Alexander, Duke of Württemberg
18. Albert II, Margrave of Brandenburg-Ansbach
9. Princess Eleonore Juliane of Brandenburg-Ansbach
19. Countess Sophie Margarete of Oettingen-Oettingen
2. Frederick II Eugene, Duke of Württemberg
20. Eugen Alexander Franz, Prince of Thurn and Taxis
10. Anselm Franz, Prince of Thurn and Taxis
21. Princess Anna Adelheid of Fürstenberg
5. Princess Marie Auguste of Thurn and Taxis
22. Ferdinand August, Prince of Lobkowicz
11. Princess Louise Anne of Lobkowicz
23. Princess Maria Anna of Baden-Baden
1. Duke William Frederick Philip of Württemberg
24. Frederick William, Elector of Brandenburg
12. Philip William, Margrave of Brandenburg-Schwedt
25. Princess Dorothea of Schleswig-Holstein-Sonderburg-Glücksburg
6. Frederick William, Margrave of Brandenburg-Schwedt
26. John George II, Prince of Anhalt-Dessau
13. Princess Johanna Charlotte of Anhalt-Dessau
27. Henriette Catherine of Nassau-Orange
3. Princess Friederike of Brandenburg-Schwedt
28. Frederick I of Prussia
14. Frederick William I of Prussia
29. Princess Sophia Charlotte of Hanover
7. Princess Sophia Dorothea of Prussia
30. George I of Great Britain
15. Princess Sophia Dorothea of Hanover
31. Princess Sophia Dorothea of Celle

== Honours ==
- Grand Cross of the Order of the Württemberg Crown
- Grand Cross of the Württemberg Military Merit Order
- 1803 Knights' Cross of the Danish Order of the Elephant
- Grand Cross of the French Legion of Honour

== See also ==
- History of Württemberg
- History of Denmark#The 19th century

== Bibliography ==
- Wolfgang Schmierer: Wilhelm, Herzog von Württemberg, in Sönke Lorenz, Dieter Mertens, Volker Press eds. Das Haus Württemberg: Ein biographisches Lexikon. Kohlhammer, Stuttgart 1997, ISBN 3-17-013605-4, S. 380 f.
- Frank Raberg: Biographisches Handbuch der württembergischen Landtagsabgeordneten 1815–1933. Kohlhammer Verlag, Stuttgart 2001, S. 1050 f.
