= Théodolinde de Beauharnais =

19th-century Franco-German princess

Théodolinde of Leuchtenberg
- Countess Wilhelm of Württemberg
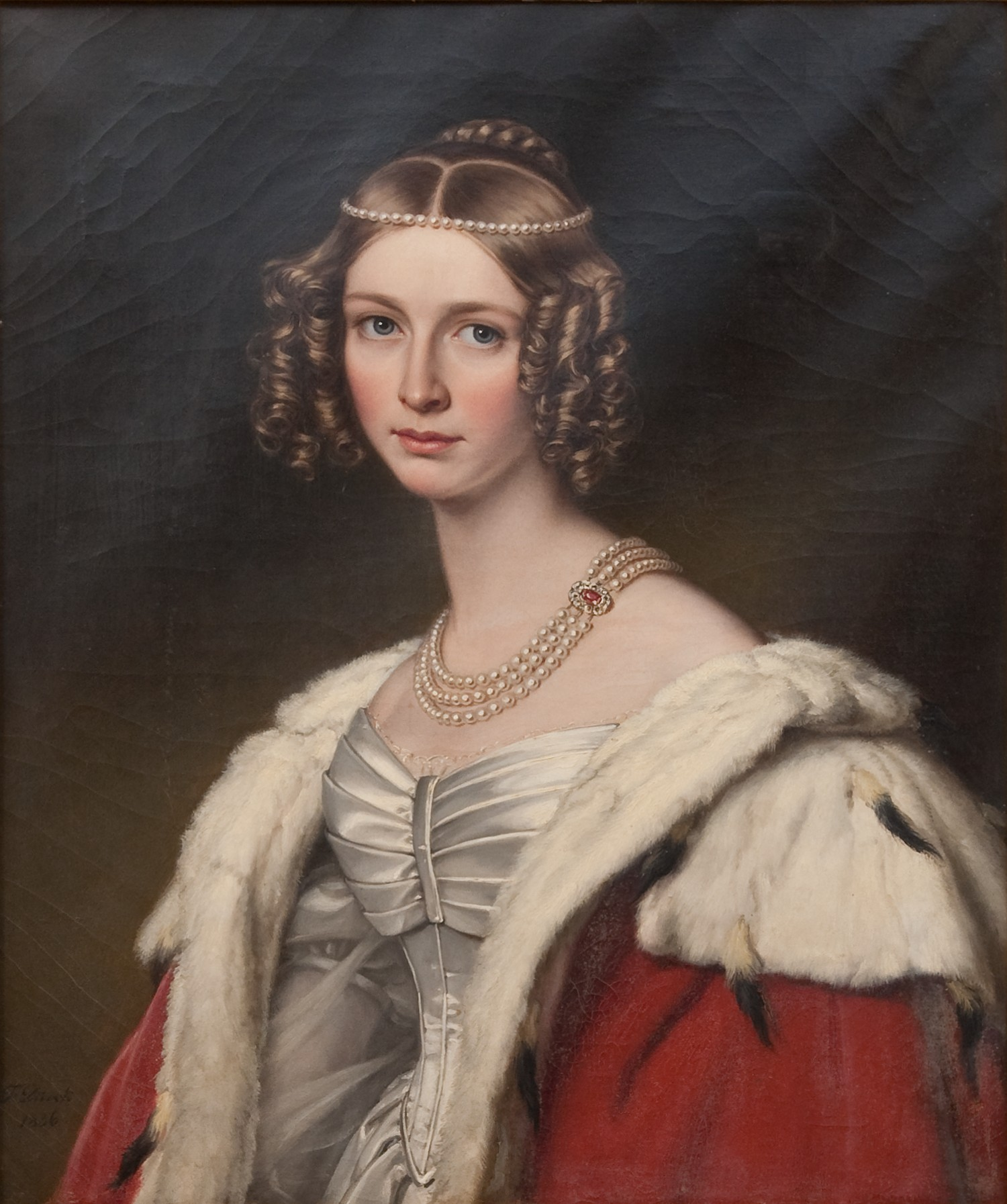
- Portrait by Friedrich Dürck, 1836
- Born: 13 April 1814; Mantua, Kingdom of Italy
- Died: 1 April 1857 (aged 42); Stuttgart, Kingdom of Württemberg
- Burial: Ludwigsburg Palace
- Spouse: Count Wilhelm of Württemberg (m. 1841)
- Issue: Augusta, Countess Rudolf von Thun und Hohenstein; Princess Marie; Princess Eugenia; Mathilde, Princess of Oriolo and Viano
Names
- Théodolinde Louise Eugénie Auguste Napoléone de Beauharnais
- House: Beauharnais
- Father: Eugène de Beauharnais, Duke of Leuchtenberg
- Mother: Princess Augusta of Bavaria

Théodolinde of Leuchtenberg (French: Théodelinde Louise Eugénie Auguste Napoléone de Beauharnais; 13 April 1814 – 1 April 1857), Countess of Württemberg by marriage, was a Franco-German princess. She was a granddaughter of Joséphine de Beauharnais, Napoleon's first wife.

== Biography ==
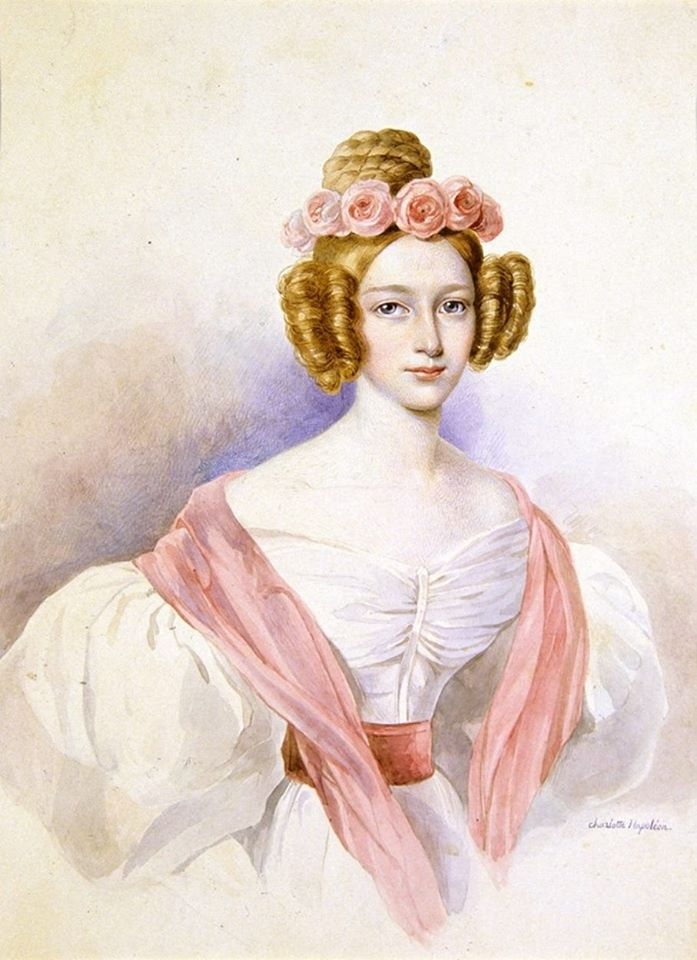
Portrait of princess Théodolinde of Leuchtenberg by Charlotte Bonaparte

The fifth of the seven children of Eugène de Beauharnais (1781–1824), Duke of Leuchtenberg, and his wife, Princess Augusta of Bavaria (1788–1851), Théodolinde was born in Mantua, Italy, and presumably named for Theudelinda, a 6th-century queen of the Lombards. She had two brothers (Auguste and Maximilian) and three surviving sisters (Joséphine, Eugénie, and Amélie). Joséphine de Beauharnais, the first wife of Napoléon Bonaparte and former Empress of France, was her paternal grandmother. The latter, however, died about six weeks after Théodolinde's birth.

Through her marriage to Friedrich Wilhelm Alexander Ferdinand, Count of Württemberg, Théodolinde became Countess (Gräfin) of Württemberg, but died before her husband was created Duke of Urach. She died after a short illness on the morning of 1 April 1857 in Stuttgart, Germany, and was buried in the family vault at Ludwigsburg Palace, with her heart buried at the Hauskapelle of the palace in Munich.

She was the subject of an 1836 portrait by Friedrich Dürck.

== Marriage and issue ==
On 8 February 1841, at the age of 26, she was married in Munich to Wilhelm, Count of Württemberg (afterwards Duke of Urach), whose father, Wilhelm Friedrich of Württemberg, was a younger brother of Friedrich II, the last Duke of Würtemberg, whom Napoleon later (1806) elevated to the status of King of Württemberg, as Friedrich I. He was also a cousin of Princess Catharina of Württemberg (1783–1835), who became the second wife of Jérôme Bonaparte, Napoleon's youngest brother, in 1807.

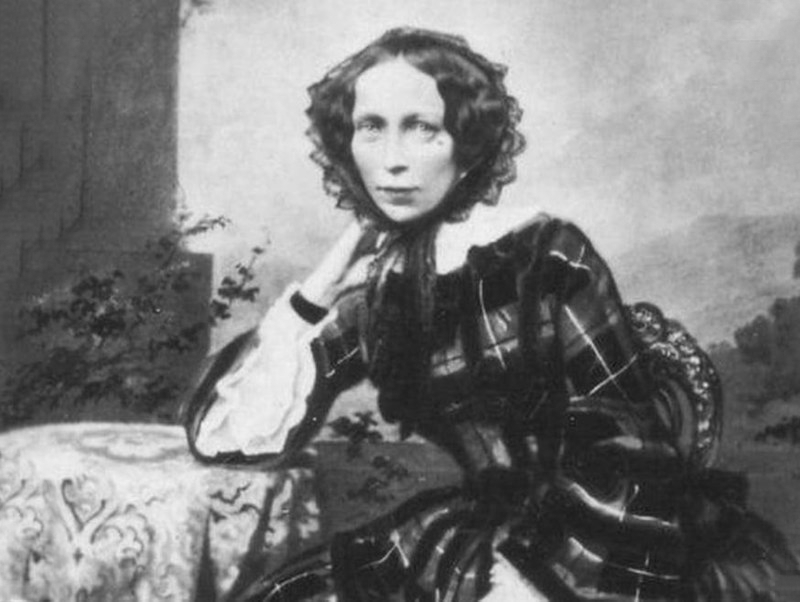
Photograph in 1854

Four daughters were born from this marriage:

- Princess Augusta Eugenie of Urach (1842–1916)
  - Married first Count Rudolf von Enzenberg zum Freyen und Jochelsthurn (1835–1874) and second Count Franz von Thun und Hohenstein (1826–1888). Both of her marriages produced issue.
- Princess Marie Josephine of Urach (10 October 1844 - 13 January 1864).
- Princess Eugenia Amalie of Urach (13 September 1848 – 26 November 1867).
- Princess Mathilde of Urach (14 January 1854 – 13 July 1907)
  - Married Paolo Altieri, Prince of Oriolo and Viano (1849–1901), by whom she had issue.

Her husband's second marriage to Princess Florestine of Monaco produced his heir, the future Wilhelm Karl, Duke of Urach.

== Ancestry ==
Ancestors of Théodolinde de Beauharnais

8. François de Beauharnais, marquis de La Ferté-Beauharnais
4. Alexandre, vicomte de Beauharnais
9. Henriette Pyvart de Chastullé
2. Eugène, Duke of Leuchtenberg
10. Joseph Gaspard Tascher de La Pagerie
5. Joséphine Tascher de La Pagerie
11. Rose Claire des Vergers de Sannois
1. Princess Théodolinde of Leuchtenberg
12. Frederick Michael, Count Palatine of Zweibrücken
6. Maximilian I Joseph of Bavaria
13. Countess Palatine Maria Franziska of Sulzbach
3. Princess Augusta of Bavaria
14. Prince George William of Hesse-Darmstadt
7. Princess Augusta Wilhelmine of Hesse-Darmstadt
15. Countess Maria Louise Albertine of Leiningen-Dagsburg-Falkenburg

== Notes ==
- Arnold McNaughton: The Book of Kings: A Royal Genealogy, London (1973)
