= Amalie of Zweibrücken-Birkenfeld =

Electress/Queen of Saxony from 1769 to 1827

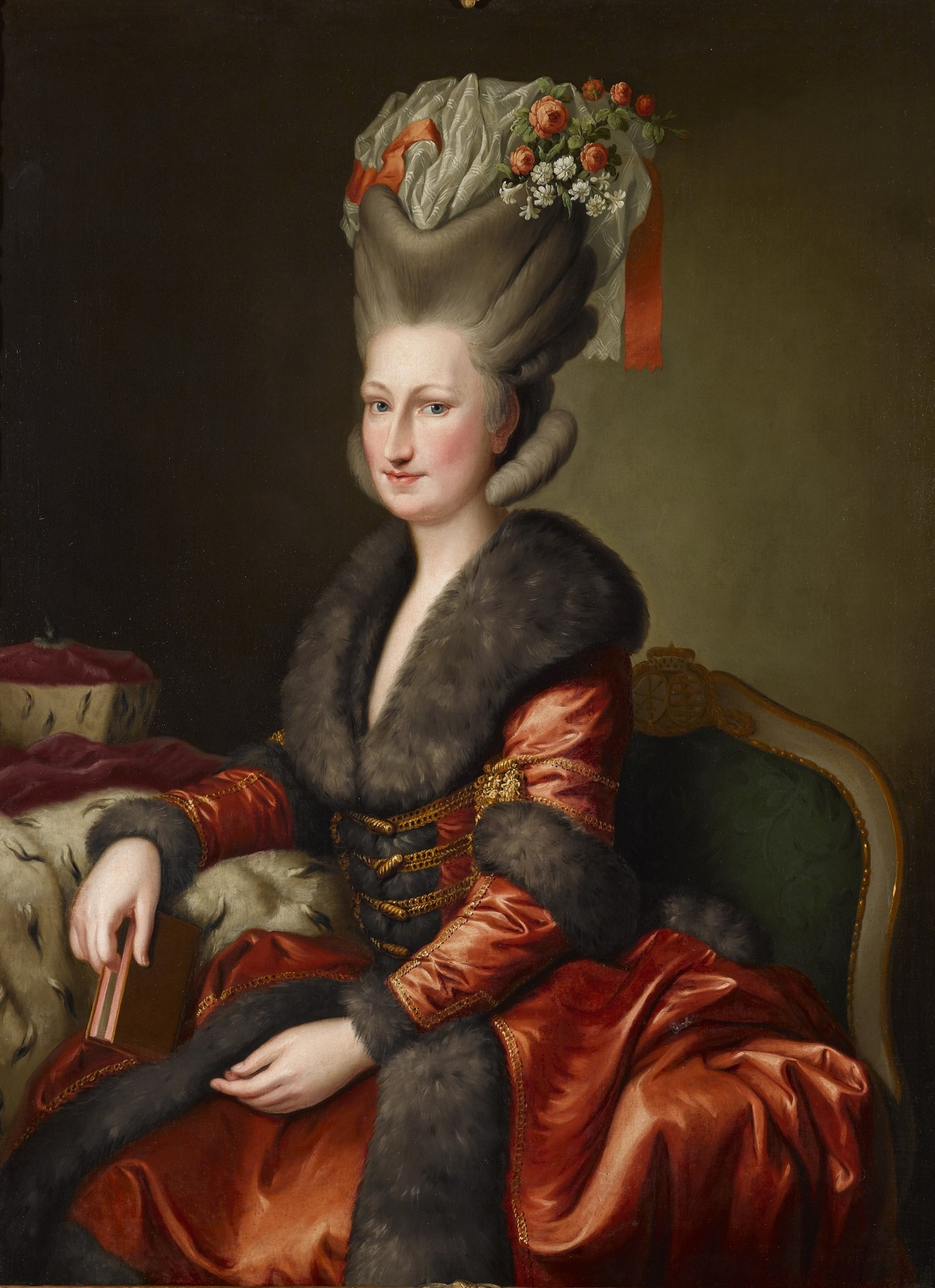
- Amalie in Polish dress, around 1780, by Heinrich Carl Brandt

Queen consort of Saxony
- Tenure: 20 December 1806 – 5 May 1827

Duchess consort of Warsaw
- Tenure: 9 June 1807 – 22 May 1815

Electress consort of Saxony
- Tenure: 29 January 1769 – 20 December 1806
- Born: 10 May 1752; Mannheim
- Died: 15 November 1828 (aged 76)
- Burial: Hofkirche, Dresden
- Spouse: Frederick Augustus I of Saxony (m. 1769; died 1827)
- Issue: Princess Maria Augusta of Saxony
Names
- Maria Amalie Auguste
- House: House of Wittelsbach; House of Wettin
- Father: Frederick Michael of Zweibrücken-Birkenfeld
- Mother: Countess Palatine Maria Franziska of Sulzbach

Amalie of Zweibrücken-Birkenfeld-Bischweiler (Maria Amalie Auguste; 10 May 1752 – 15 November 1828) was the last Electress and first Queen of Saxony and Duchess of Warsaw.

== Biography ==
Amalie was born in Mannheim, the daughter of Count Palatine Frederick Michael of Palatinate-Zweibrücken-Birkenfeld-Bischweiler and Countess Palatine Maria Franziska of Pfalz-Sulzbach. She was the sister of Maximilian Joseph, later first King of Bavaria.

On 29 January 1769, she married the Saxon Elector Frederick Augustus III. In 1806, the Electress and her husband were proclaimed the first King and Queen of Saxony. The following year, Napoleon I made them Duke and Duchess of Warsaw, a newly created principality in Poland.

Amalie bore four children, three of whom were stillborn. Only one daughter, Princess Maria Augusta, attained adulthood, but remained unmarried. From 1804, at the death of her sister-in-law Carolina of Parma, she and her other sister-in-law, Maria Theresa of Austria, shared the responsibility of raising the former's children, something they are said to have done very strictly.

Amalie died on 15 November 1828 at the age of 76, and was buried in the Hofkirche in Dresden.

== Issue ==
1. unnamed child (born/died 1771)
2. unnamed child (born/died 1775)
3. Maria Augusta Nepomucena Antonia Francisca Xaveria Aloysia (born Dresden 21 June 1782 - died Dresden 14 March 1863)
4. unnamed child (born/died 1797)

== Ancestry ==
Ancestors of Amalie of Zweibrücken-Birkenfeld

16. Christian I, Count Palatine of Birkenfeld-Bischweiler
8. Christian II, Count Palatine of Zweibrücken-Birkenfeld
17. Countess Palatine Magdalene Catherine of Zweibrücken
4. Christian III, Count Palatine of Zweibrücken
18. Johann Jakob, Count of Rappoltstein
9. Countess Katharina Agathe of Rappoltstein
19. Anna Claudia, Countess of Salm-Kyrburg
2. Frederick Michael, Count Palatine of Zweibrücken
20. Gustav Adolph, Count of Nassau-Saarbrücken
10. Louis Crato, Count of Nassau-Saarbrücken
21. Landgravine Eleonore Klara of Hohenlohe-Neuenstein
5. Countess Caroline of Nassau-Saarbrücken
22. Henry Frederick, Count of Hohenlohe-Langenburg
11. Countess Philippine Henriette of Hohenlohe-Langenburg
23. Countess Juliana Dorothea of Castell-Remlingen
1. Amalie of Zweibrücken-Birkenfeld
24. Christian Augustus, Count Palatine of Sulzbach
12. Theodore Eustace, Count Palatine of Sulzbach
25. Countess Amalie of Nassau-Siegen
6. Joseph Charles, Hereditary Prince of Sulzbach
26. William, Landgrave of Hesse-Rotenburg
13. Landgravine Maria Eleonore of Hesse-Rotenburg
27. Countess Maria Anna of Löwenstein-Wertheim-Rochefort
3. Countess Palatine Maria Franziska of Sulzbach
28. Philip William, Elector Palatine
14. Charles III Philip, Elector Palatine
29. Landgravine Elisabeth Amalie of Hesse-Darmstadt
7. Countess Palatine Elisabeth Auguste Sofie of Neuburg
30. Prince Bogusław Radziwiłł
15. Princess Ludwika Karolina Radziwiłł
31. Princess Anna Maria Radziwiłł

Amalie of Zweibrücken-Birkenfeld House of Wittelsbach Born: 10 May 1752 Died: 15 November 1828
German royalty
Preceded by Maria Antonia of Bavaria	Electress of Saxony; 29 January 1769 – 20 December 1806	Electorate abolished
Kingdom created	Queen consort of Saxony; 20 December 1806 – 5 May 1827	Succeeded by Maria Theresa of Tuscany
Duchy created	Duchess of Warsaw; 9 June 1807 – January 1813	Duchy abolished
