= Elisabeth Auguste of Sulzbach =

- Electress of Bavaria; Electress Palatine
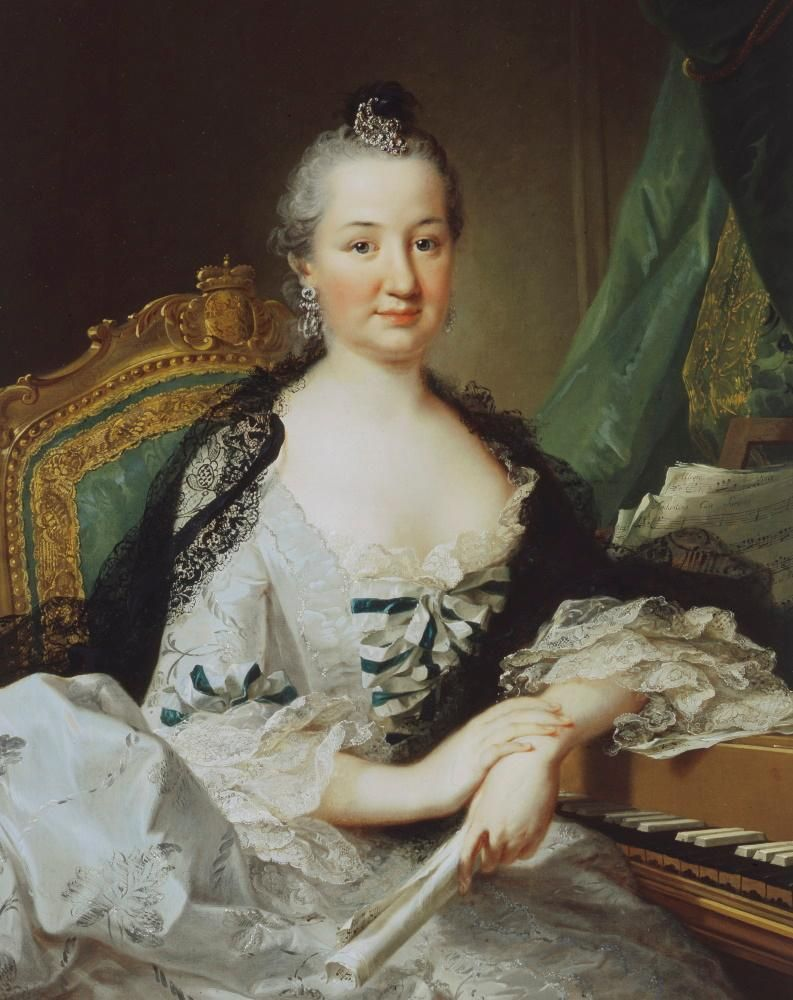
- Portrait by Johann Heinrich Tischbein, c. 1752
- Born: 17 January 1721; Mannheim Palace, Germany
- Died: 17 August 1794 (aged 73); Weinheim, Germany
- Spouse: Charles IV Theodore (m. 1742)
- Issue: Francis Louis Joseph of Sulzbach
- House: Wittelsbach
- Father: Joseph Charles of Sulzbach
- Mother: Elisabeth Auguste of Neuburg

Elisabeth Auguste of Sulzbach (Elisabeth Auguste; 17 January 1721 – 17 August 1794) was the eldest granddaughter of the Elector of the Palatinate Charles III Philip, and by her marriage to Elector Palatine Charles IV Theodore, Electress Palatine and later Electress of Bavaria.

== Biography ==
Elisabeth Auguste's parents were Joseph Charles of Sulzbach (1694–1729) and Elisabeth Auguste of Neuburg (1693–1728), the latter the daughter of Elector Charles III Philip. On 17 January 1742, she married her cousin Charles Theodore of Sulzbach, who became Elector of the Palatinate in 1742 and Elector of Bavaria in 1777.

The marriage was arranged to avoid a potential inheritance dispute within the different family branches. While Charles Theodore was described as learned and interested in the enlightenment, Elisabeth Augusta was described as vivacious, pleasure loving, uneducated and shallow. During the first half of their marriage, she is said to have dominated her spouse, and during the Seven Years' War, she exerted influence over the Palatine foreign policy. In 1760, however, it was reported that Charles Theodor was beginning to free himself from her dominance.

Elisabeth Auguste bore only one child, a son (christened Francis Louis Joseph) on 28 June 1762, twenty years after their marriage; but the long-awaited son and heir to the Palatinate died just one day after his birth. The couple thereafter largely lived apart, each one taking lovers of their own. Divorce was never contemplated. Due to her not having a child and unable to have another legitimate child due to the discontinued marital sexual relations, she had no power base at court after she had lost her personal influence over her spouse. In 1764, Charles Theodor had an official mistress, the dancer Françoise Despres-Verneuil, who was succeeded by Josefa Seiffert in 1766, which was a humiliation for Elisabeth Auguste.

Elisabeth Auguste moved to her own residence, Schloss Oggersheim, where she lived permanently with her own court from 1768, only making formal visits to the court of her spouse in winter: after 1781, she discontinued also with these visits. She did not like the Bavarian court, which she regarded to be too spartan for her taste. She was quite popular in the Palatinate, especially since Charles Theodor moved to Bavaria in 1777.

At the end of 1793, in the face of advancing French troops, Elisabeth Auguste fled to Weinheim, where she died in 1794. Her husband subsequently married Maria Leopoldine of Austria-Este.

== Honours ==
Electorate of Bavaria : First Sovereign of the Order of Saint Elizabeth (feminine order)

== Issue ==
- Count Palatine Franz Ludwig Joseph of Sulzbach (28 June 1762 – 29 June 1762) died in infancy.

== Ancestry ==
Ancestors of Elisabeth Auguste of Sulzbach

16. Augustus, Count Palatine of Sulzbach
8. Christian Augustus, Count Palatine of Sulzbach
17. Hedwig of Schleswig-Holstein-Gottorp
4. Theodore Eustace, Count Palatine of Sulzbach
18. John VII, Count of Nassau-Siegen
9. Amalie of Nassau-Siegen
19. Margaret of Schleswig-Holstein-Sonderburg
2. Joseph Charles of Sulzbach
20. Ernst, Landgrave of Hesse-Rheinfels-Rotenburg
10. Wilhelm, Landgrave of Hesse-Rheinfels-Rotenburg
21. Countess Marie Eleonore of Solms-Hohensolms
5. Eleonore of Hesse-Rheinfels-Rotenburg
22. Ferdinand Karl, Count of Löwenstein-Wertheim-Rochefort
11. Maria of Löwenstein-Wertheim-Rochefort
23. Countess Anna Maria of Fürstenberg-Heiligenberg
1. Countess Palatine Elisabeth Auguste of Sulzbach
24. Wolfgang William, Count Palatine of Neuburg
12. Philip William, Elector Palatine
25. Magdalene of Bavaria
6. Charles III Philip, Elector Palatine
26. George II, Landgrave of Hesse-Darmstadt
13. Elisabeth Amalie of Hesse-Darmstadt
27. Sophia Eleonore of Saxony
3. Countess Palatine Elisabeth of Neuburg
28. Janusz Radziwiłł
14. Bogusław Radziwiłł
29. Elisabeth Sophia of Brandenburg
7. Ludwika Karolina Radziwiłł
30. Janusz Radziwiłł
15. Anna Maria Radziwiłł
31. Katarzyna Potocka

== Bibliography ==
- Lebenslust und Frömmigkeit, Kurfürst Carl Theodor zwischen Barock und Aufklärung, Handbuch ISBN 3-7917-1679-4 und Ausstellungskatalog ISBN 3-7917-1679-4
- Karl Kreuter, Kurfüstin Elisabeth Auguste von Pfalz-Bayern 1727 - 1794, Oggersheim 1919

Preceded by Anna Maria Luisa de' Medici	Electress Palatine; 1742–1777	Succeeded by Title merged with Bavaria
Preceded by Maria Anna Sophia of Saxony	Electress of Bavaria; 1777–1794	Succeeded by Maria Leopoldine of Austria-Este
