= Maria Anna of Sulzbach =

Duchess of Bavaria (1722–1790)

- Duchess of Bavaria
- Portrait by Georg Desmarées, c. 1745
- Born: 22 June 1722; Schwetzingen, Electorate of the Palatinate
- Died: 25 April 1790 (aged 67); Munich, Electorate of Bavaria
- Burial: Theatine Church
- Spouse: Duke Clement Francis of Bavaria (m. 1742; died 1770)
- Issue: 4, died young
- House: Wittelsbach
- Father: Count Palatine Joseph Charles of Sulzbach
- Mother: Countess Palatine Elisabeth Auguste Sofie of Neuburg
- Religion: Catholic Church
- Occupation: Politician

Maria Anna of Sulzbach (Maria Anna Josepha Charlotte; 22 June 1722 – 25 April 1790) was a Bavarian duchess and a leading member of the anti-Austrian patriot group at the Munich court.

She was Countess Palatine of Sulzbach by birth and Duchess of Bavaria by marriage to Duke Clement Francis of Bavaria.

== Life ==
=== Childhood ===
Maria Anna was born in Schwetzingen, the fourth child of Joseph Charles, Hereditary Prince of Sulzbach and Elisabeth Auguste Sofie of Neuburg. Of her six siblings, only she and two sisters survived to adulthood: Elisabeth Auguste and Maria Franziska. Her mother was the only surviving daughter of Charles III Philip, Elector Palatine, whose death in 1742 ended the Palatinate-Neuburg line and passed the electorate to the Palatinate-Sulzbach line.

After her mother's death when she was five years old, and her father's the following year, Maria Anna was orphaned at the age of seven. She spent most of her youth at her grandfather's court, and he became her guardian.

=== Marriage and issue ===
She married Duke Clement Francis of Bavaria on 17 January 1742 in Mannheim. At the same time, her older sister Elisabeth Auguste married their cousin Charles Theodore of Sulzbach, who would become Elector of the Palatinate after Charles III Philip's death in 1742 and Elector of Bavaria in 1777.

The couple had at least four children, all of whom died on the day of their birth: (Note: Sources differ on the number. Schmid gives one son and three daughters, matching the four listed here. Rosenlehner gives four, or by other accounts six. Häutle lists these four and two further, doubtful children.)

- Duchess Maria of Bavaria (born and died 25 September 1748) (Note: Her coffin inscription gives 30 September, but Häutle treats 25 September as the documented date.)
- Son (born and died 28 January 1753)
- Duchess Maria Anna of Bavaria (born and died 31 May 1754)
- Daughter (born and died 25 June 1756)

=== Later life ===
Maria Anna died in Munich on 25 April 1790 at the age of 67. Her body is buried in the Theatine Church, with her heart interred at Altötting.

== Politics ==
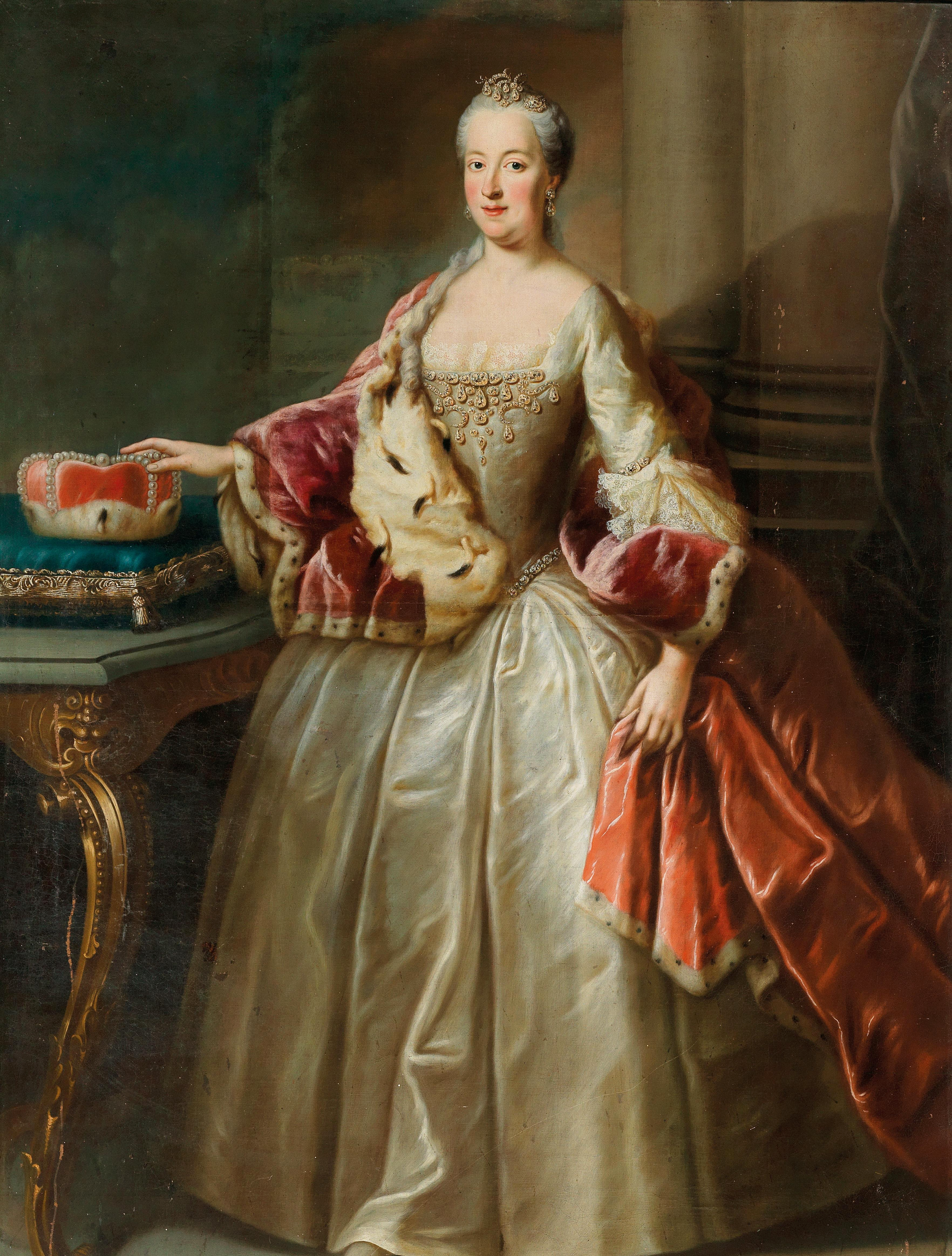
State portrait of the Duchess in an ermine-lined mantle, holding a crown

Maria Anna became politically active during the War of the Austrian Succession in an attempt to preserve Bavaria's independence from Austria. She condemned the 1745 Treaty of Füssen, in which the Elector of Bavaria, Maximilian III Joseph, agreed to support Francis I, Maria Theresa's husband, as the next Holy Roman Emperor. She persuaded her husband never to recognise the treaty, and to cede his own rights to the Bavarian succession to Charles Theodore. She also helped to initiate a Wittelsbach house union, concluded on 31 October 1746, though her hope of drawing Bavaria to the French side through it was disappointed.

During the Seven Years' War, she was a leading member of the Neutralitätspartei (Neutrality Party) at the Munich court. Following Prussia's defeat at the Battle of Hochkirch on 14 October 1758, Maria Anna secretly sent a letter that the Prussian envoy at the Perpetual Diet of Regensburg, Erich Christoph von Plotho, forwarded to Frederick II of Prussia. In it she grieved for his defeat and the death of his sister, and hoped for the eventual victory of his cause. Frederick declined Plotho's request that he write to her.

Maria Anna and her husband Clement (left) with the Bavarian electoral family; Maria Antonia is at the easel

Over three years later, in January 1762, Frederick told Plotho he was "touched" by the "worthy and patriotic as well as righteous princess", (Note: German: gerühret and würdigen und so patriotisch als rechtschaffen gesinneten Prinzessin.) and when Plotho asked him again, he wrote to thank her the following month. He signed several of his letters to her as her "friend". This exchange of letters, which she ended for the time being in June 1762, did not produce political results, but the relationships established paid off. Through her friendship with Plotho she paved the way for the agreement that Maximilian III Joseph reached with the Prussian King in January 1763, in which Bavaria would provide neither military nor financial support for the war against Prussia, while in return Prussia would uphold the rights and claims of the Bavarian electoral house. This bond became important fifteen years later.

From 1748, as the Elector and his wife remained childless, Maria Anna worked to secure the Palatine succession in Bavaria. She promoted the Wittelsbach house treaties of 1761, 1766, 1771 and 1774, to make Bavarian inheritance interference more difficult for the Habsburgs and for Saxony, and she was openly regarded as the head of the Bavarian patriot party.

Portrait with a mask by Desmarées, c. 1758

After the death of the childless Elector Maximilian III Joseph on 30 December 1777, the direct male line of the Bavarian Electors became extinct and the Habsburgs laid claim to Lower Bavaria and the Upper Palatinate. His successor, Charles Theodore, recognised Austria's claims in a convention of 3 January 1778. Maria Anna contacted King Frederick II, asking him not to allow Austria to destroy Bavaria's independence and to consider how to help, and urged Charles Theodore's heir, Charles August of Zweibrücken, not to sign the convention. Frederick had not waited for her appeal, and had already ordered Count Johann Eustach von Görtz to go to Munich in secret. When Görtz arrived on 6 February 1778, Maria Anna hid him in her garden palace until nightfall, then had him brought to the Maxburg where she arranged a secret audience with Charles August. The next day she arranged a conference between Görtz and Charles August's ministers, Johann Christian von Hofenfels and Freiherr von Esebeck. Charles August then officially protested against Austria's claims, refused to accede to the convention, and called on Frederick to guarantee the Wittelsbach house treaties. In a letter dated 13 February 1778, Frederick acknowledged her services to Bavaria and regretted only that she was not Elector.

Negotiations failed, and the War of the Bavarian Succession began when Prussian troops crossed into Bohemia on 5 July 1778. The Treaty of Teschen of 1779 preserved Bavaria but ceded the Innviertel region to Austria, to Maria Anna's disappointment. Historians differ on her influence: Alois Schmid counts Frederick's military resistance partly as a result of her efforts, while August Rosenlehner holds that Frederick would have acted in his own interest regardless, but credits her with stiffening Charles August's resistance.

== In fiction ==
Her fictionalized life was told in the 1931 novel Die Dame mit dem Samtvisier (The Lady with the Velvet Visor) by Horst Wolfram Geißler.
