= Charles II August, Duke of Zweibrücken =

Charles II August
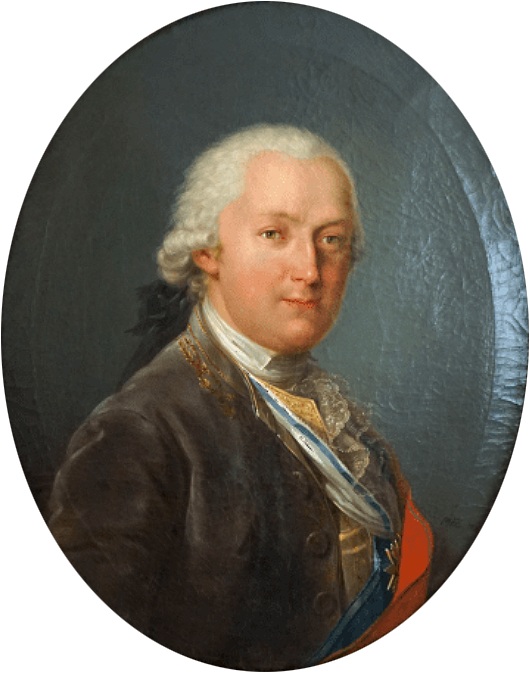
- Portrait of Charles II

Duke of Zweibrücken
- Reign: 5 November 1775 – 1 April 1795
- Predecessor: Christian IV
- Successor: Maximilian
- Born: 29 October 1746; Düsseldorf, Electoral Palatinate, Holy Roman Empire
- Died: 1 April 1795 (aged 48); Mannheim, Electoral Palatinate, Holy Roman Empire
- Burial: St. Michael's Church, Munich
- Spouse: Maria Amalia of Saxony
- Issue: Charles Augustus Fredrick
- House: Palatinate-Zweibrücken-Birkenfeld
- Father: Frederick Michael, Count Palatine of Birkenfeeld-Bishwiller-Rappolstein
- Mother: Maria Franziska of Sulzbach
- Religion: Roman Catholicism

Charles II August Christian (German: Karl II. August Christian; 29 October 1746 – 1 April 1795) was Duke of Zweibrücken from 1775 to 1795. A member of the Palatine House of Zweibrücken-Birkenfeld, a branch of the House of Wittelsbach, he was the elder brother of the first King of Bavaria, Maximilian I, and of Queen Amalia of Saxony.

== Biography ==
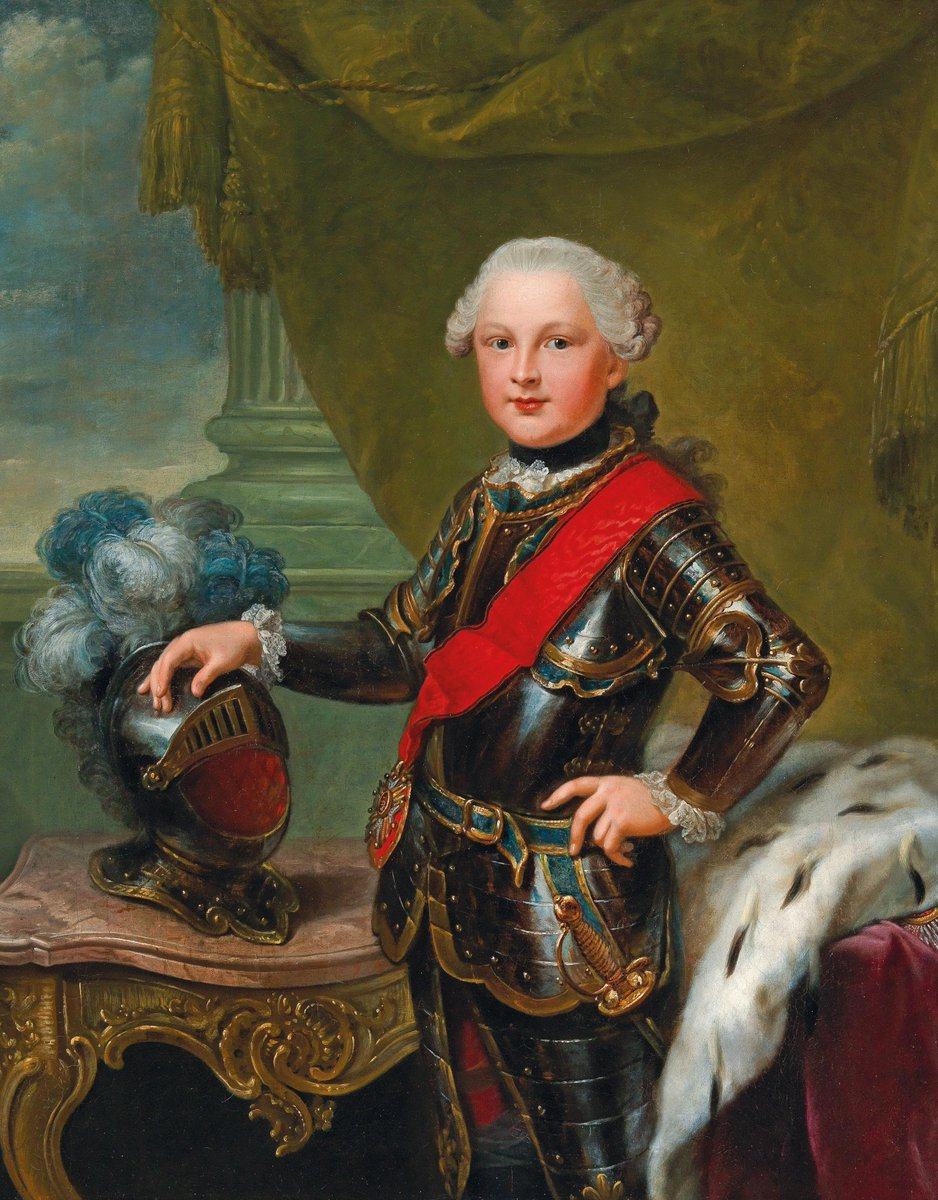
Charles as a child, portrait by Johann Georg Ziesenis.

Charles was born in Düsseldorf, the oldest of five children of Frederick Michael, Count Palatine of Birkenfeld and Countess Palatine Maria Franziska of Sulzbach. His father converted to his mother's Roman Catholic faith shortly after his birth, he and his siblings being raised in that denomination. He inherited the Duchy of Zweibrücken from his paternal uncle, Duke Christian IV, in 1775. He was heir presumptive to his childless cousin Charles Theodore, Elector of Bavaria whom, however, he predeceased. He ceded to his younger brother Maximilian Joseph the County of Rappoltstein in 1776, having inherited it when their father died in 1767.

== Rejected suitor ==
He wanted to marry Archduchess Maria Amalia of Austria, the eighth child of Empress Maria Theresa. He was well known in the Austrian court, and Maria Amalia was also in love with him. However, Maria Theresa deemed him of insufficient rank to marry an archduchess. Moreover, she wanted to strengthen Austria's alliance with the House of Bourbon by marrying a daughter to Ferdinand, Duke of Parma, a grandson of the French king, Louis XV. This was to be Maria Amalia, due to the death of another daughter, Maria Josepha.

Maria Amalia's older brother, Emperor Joseph II, also favored the marriage of his sister to the Duke of Parma, who was the younger brother of his beloved wife, Isabella. So in 1769, Maria Amalia was married to Ferdinand against her will. This decision not only permanently embittered Charles against the empress and Austria but also Maria Amalia against her mother.

== Bavarian claims ==
His cousin Maximilian III Joseph, Elector of Bavaria, died without children in December 1777. Their mutual cousin, Charles Theodore of Sulzbach, then Elector Palatine, succeeded Maximilian Joseph as prince elector. However, Charles Theodore had no legitimate children to inherit his combined holdings in Bavaria and the Electoral Palatinate, so Charles August became the heir to the Wittelsbach territories of: Zweibrücken (his own duchy), the duchies of Neuburg, Sulzbach, Jülich and Berg, in addition to the electorates of the Palatinate and Bavaria (though exercising only one electoral vote in the College of Electors, as stipulated in the Peace of Westphalia in 1648). Charles Theodore preferred the Palatinate and therefore tried to exchange parts of his Bavarian inheritance with Joseph II of Austria in return for parts of the Austrian Netherlands. Although Charles Theodore would have preferred to exchange the entire complex of territories of Bavaria for the Austrian Netherlands, the Austrian court would not countenance an outright exchange and a final arrangement was never concluded.

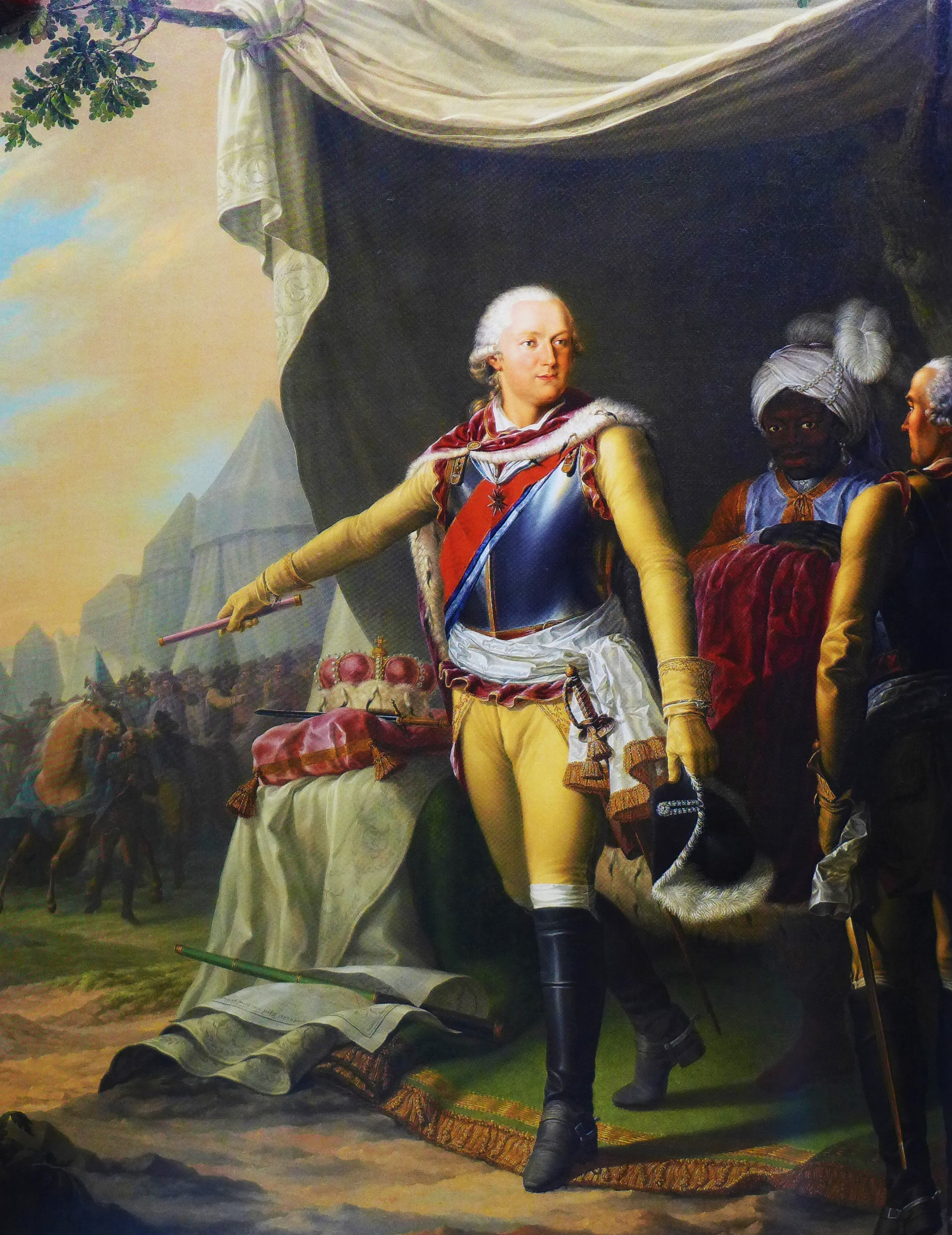
Portrait by Johann Kaspar Pitz, 1783

Charles August, being next in line for the Bavarian territories, objected strenuously. He obtained the active support of Frederick the Great of Prussia and the Elector Frederick Augustus III of Saxony. The French government under Foreign Minister Charles Gravier, comte de Vergennes passively supported Charles II August despite France's formal alliance with Austria.

The War of the Bavarian Succession was resolved without prolonged fighting; Charles Theodore succeeded in all of Bavaria except for the district east of the Inn River, known as the Innviertel, assigned to Austria by the Treaty of Teschen (May 1779). A second attempt to make the exchange in 1784 was also opposed by Charles August, again with Prussian support, and also failed. However, Charles Theodore outlived Charles August who, dying in 1795 without sons, left his claim to Bavaria to his brother, Maximilian Joseph, who would succeed in vastly enlarging that realm and, in 1806, becoming its king.

== Marriage ==
In Dresden in 1774, Charles married Maria Amalia of Saxony, daughter of Frederick Christian, Elector of Saxony (and granddaughter of Charles VII, Holy Roman Emperor). Their only child, Charles Augustus Frederick, died at the age of eight on 21 August 1784. Upon the death of Charles II August the title of duke of Zweibrücken was inherited by his brother Maximilian, future king of Bavaria, who reunited the long separate Wittelsbach holdings.

Charles August was the principal owner of the famous Karlsberg Castle. He died at Mannheim in 1795.

== Ancestry ==
Ancestors of Charles II August, Duke of Zweibrücken

8. Christian II, Count Palatine of Zweibrücken-Birkenfeld
4. Christian III, Duke of Zweibrücken
9. Countess Katharina Agathe of Rappoltstein
2. Frederick Michael, Count Palatine of Zweibrücken-Birkenfeld
10. Louis Crato, Count of Nassau-Saarbrücken
5. Countess Caroline of Nassau-Saarbrücken
11. Princess Philippine Henriette of Hohenlohe-Langenburg
1. Charles II August, Duke of Zweibrücken
12. Theodore Eustace, Count Palatine of Sulzbach
6. Count Palatine Joseph Charles of Sulzbach
13. Landgravine Maria Eleonore of Hesse-Rotenburg
3. Countess Palatine Maria Franziska of Sulzbach
14. Charles III Philip, Elector Palatine
7. Countess Palatine Elisabeth Auguste Sofie of Neuburg
15. Princess Ludwika Karolina Radziwiłł

Charles II August, Duke of Zweibrücken House of Palatinate-Zweibrücken-Birkenfeld Cadet branch of the House of Wittelsbach Born: 29 October 1746 Died: 1 April 1795
Preceded by Christian IV	Duke of Zweibrücken; 1775–1795	Succeeded by Maximilian
