= Jesuit College in Slutsk =

Historical Jesuit educational institution in Slutsk

Slutsk Jesuit Collegium
- Latin: Collegium Sluckiensis
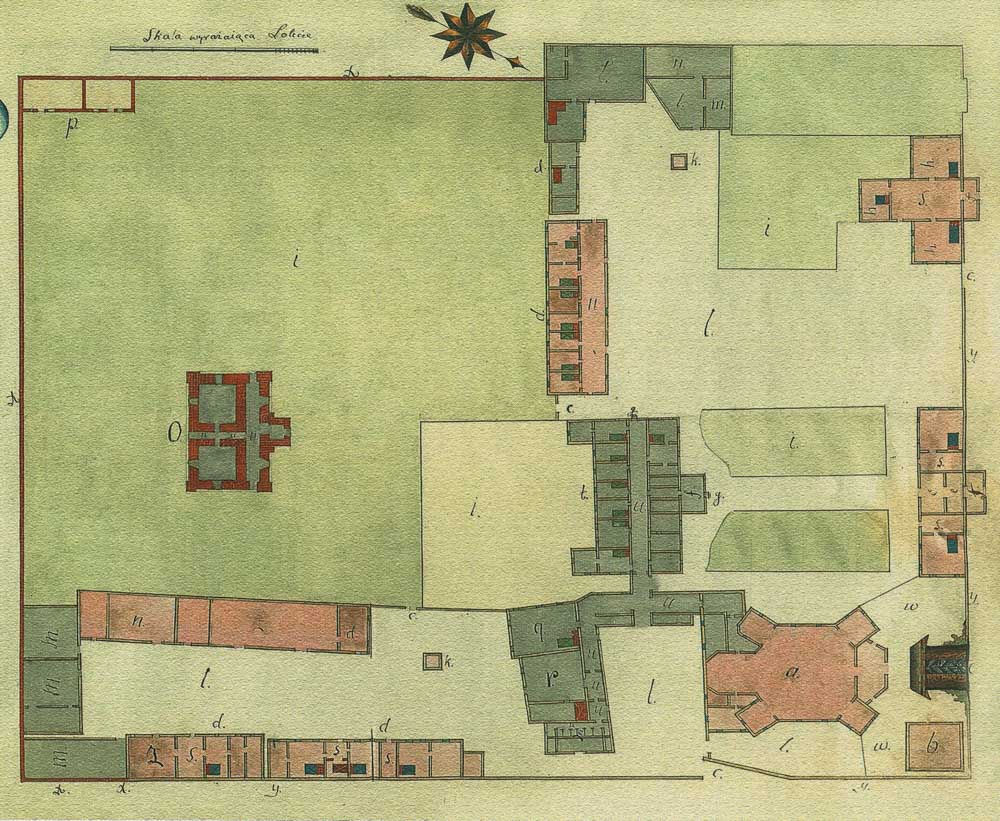
- Plan of the Slutsk Jesuit Collegium with the Church of the Holy Trinity, 1804
- Slutsk, Grand Duchy of Lithuania; Polish–Lithuanian Commonwealth

Information
- Type: Jesuit collegium
- Religious affiliation: Roman Catholic (Jesuits)
- Established: 1693 (mission); 1714 (collegium)
- Closed: 1773 (order suppressed)

The Jesuit College in Slutsk (Belarusian: Слуцкі езуіцкі калегіум; Latin: Collegium Sluckiensis) was a secondary educational institution of the classical type that existed from 1714 to 1773. It aimed to educate students in the spirit of deep religiosity, devotion to Catholicism, and the Jesuit Order.

== History ==
The Jesuit mission appeared in Slutsk in 1693. In 1703, a Jesuit residence was organized based on the mission. The husband of Ludwika Karolina Radziwiłł, Prince Charles III Philip of Neuburg, then mortgaged the Bokšycy estate with the villages of Kapacievičy and Listapadavičy to the Jesuits for 7,000 zlotys. Later, the villages of Viandlina and Vańkoŭščyna also ended up mortgaged to the Jesuits. In 1715, Lord Wawrzyniec Jiaczynski transferred the Panary estate to the Jesuits under a loan of 18,000 thalers.

From 1705, a secondary Jesuit school operated in Slutsk. The initiator of the creation of the Slutsk Collegium was a graduate of the Vilnius Academy, Hieronim Klokocki (1664–1721). He became the first rector of the collegium. Hieronim Klokocki gave his estate to the Jesuits, where the Order built the wooden Church of the Holy Trinity according to the project of architect R. Engel. To the right of the church, on the site of the former Klokocki manor, stood the converted two-story collegium building with a high roof. It was surrounded by open galleries along the perimeter. Cells were located on the first floor, and classrooms and the rectorate were on the second. Above the pillared porch with a balustrade was a hall. Behind the collegium were two wings (fligel); the second wing was notable: it had a gate in the center, above which was a mezzanine with two halls, topped with a dome and a bell. There were living rooms in the single-story wings on either side of the gate. Further in the courtyard was the dormitory building (bursa) where students lived. Behind it was a pharmacy with a mezzanine; Jan Weycher worked as a pharmacist from 1715. The only stone building was the library, built in 1724 on the initiative of the collegium rector Anastazy Ludwik Kiersnicki. The collegium library was second only to the library of the Polotsk Jesuit Collegium in the number of books; in 1773, it held about 3,000 volumes. Along the fence stood utility buildings: a bakery, a forge, a stable, and sheds. This entire large courtyard was enclosed by a wooden fence, later replaced by a stone wall.

Library of the former Jesuit Collegium

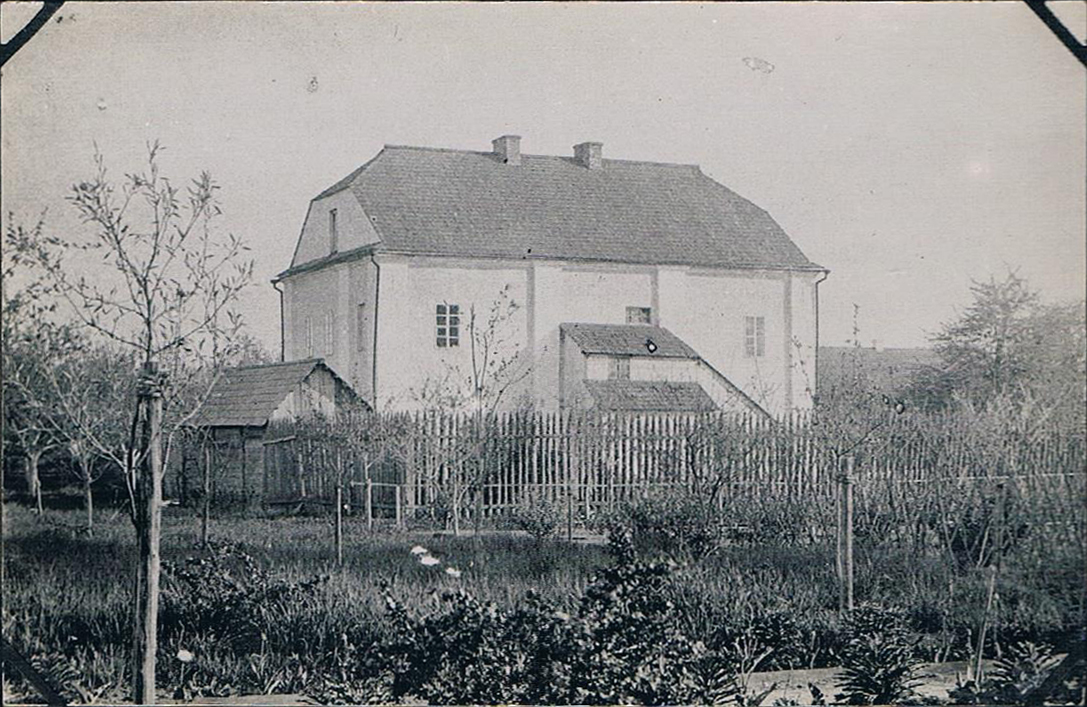
Library building, c. 1914

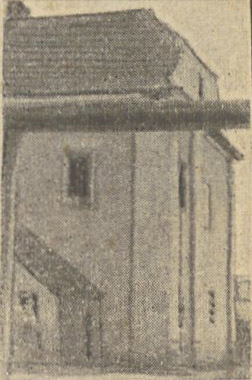
Library building, c. 1914

== Educational activities ==
The Slutsk Collegium mainly trained rhetoric teachers (scholastics). Lectures were given by Tomasz Narewicz, Józef Parzowski, Józef Zaleski, and others. History was taught by Anzelm Zaborowski and Jan Antoni Poszakowski (1684–1757), a theoretician of Catholicism and author of Catholic calendars, who was rector of the collegium in 1735–1739. For some time, the collegium was headed and taught by the publicist Anastazy Ludwik Kiersnicki (1678–1733), called Pericles for his eloquence; philosophy was taught by Antoni Adam Skorulski (1715–1780), who became rector in 1772 and was later transferred as dean of the theological faculty to the Vilnius Academy. In 1733, Michał Korycki (1714–1784), a poet and public figure, graduated from the Slutsk Jesuit Collegium. The historian Jerzy Kniazewicz (1737–1804) studied there and later taught in 1763–1764. The Catholic Church figure and educator Tadeusz Brzozowski (1749–1820), who became the Superior General of the Society of Jesus in 1805, also studied here. A boarding school (konwikt) for youths from the petty nobility operated at the collegium. Their upbringing was overseen by a regent. This position was held by Konstanty Czernski (1694–1747) and Maciej Miłaszewski (1714/1715–1801). The school theater staged plays with biblical content.

The Slutsk Collegium ceased its activities in 1773 upon the suppression of the Jesuit Order. The building and services of the collegium were transferred to the Vilnius Educational District, housing a Catholic school that trained clergy and teachers. During the reorganization of the Russian education system, the existence of two practically identical educational institutions was deemed inappropriate, and the Catholic school was transferred to Nesvizh. In 1809, the building of the former Jesuit collegium was given to the Slutsk Evangelical School.

== Bibliography ==
- "Слуцкі езуіцкі калегіум". Беларуская энцыклапедыя: У 18 т. Т. 15: Следавікі — Трыо [Belarusian Encyclopedia: In 18 Vol. Vol. 15: Sledaviki — Tryo] (in Belarusian). Мінск: БелЭн. 2002. p. 30. ISBN 985-11-0251-2.
- Кісялёў Г. К., ed. (2001). Памяць: Гіст.-дакум. хроніка Слуцкага р-на і г. Слуцка: у 2 кн. [Memory: Hist.-docum. Chronicle of Slutsk District and Slutsk City: In 2 Books] (in Belarusian). Мінск: БЕЛТА.
- Блинова, Т. Б. (2002). Иезуиты в Беларуси (Их роль в организации образования и просвещения) [Jesuits in Belarus (Their Role in the Organization of Education and Enlightenment)] (in Russian). Гродно: ГрГУ. p. 425. ISBN 985-417-353-6. Archived from the original on 2010-09-06.
- Лявшук, В. Е. (2017). Иезуитский коллегиум в социокультурном городском контексте белорусских земель ВКЛ в 1569—1773 гг. [Jesuit Collegium in the Sociocultural Urban Context of the Belarusian Lands of the GDL in 1569–1773] (PhD History thesis) (in Russian). Гродно.
- Нарэйка, Т. І. (2007). Праблемы гістарыяграфіі культурна-асветніцкай дзейнасці езуітаў на беларускіх землях [Problems of Historiography of the Cultural and Educational Activities of Jesuits in Belarusian Lands]. Працы гістарычнага факультэта БДУ (in Belarusian) (2). Мінск: БДУ.
- Ціткоўскі, І. А. (2015). Слуцк. Гісторыя горада ў помніках архітэктуры [Slutsk. History of the City in Architectural Monuments] (in Belarusian). Мінск. p. 318. ISBN 978-985-6998-71-6.
- Grzebień L., ed. (1996). Encyklopedia wiedzy o jezuitach na ziemiach Polski i Litwy 1564—1995 (in Polish). Kraków: Wydział Filozoficzny Towarzystwa Jezusowego — Instytut Kultury Religijnej — Wydawnictwo WAM.
- Królikowska, A. (2017). Profesorowie jezuickich seminariów nauczycielskich od XVI do XVIII wieku. Słownik biograficzny [Professors of Jesuit Teacher Seminaries from the 16th to the 18th Century. Biographical Dictionary] (in Polish). Kraków: Wydawnictwo Naukowe Akademii Ignatianum w Krakowie - Wydawnictwo WAM. p. 188.
