= Order of Saint Elizabeth =

Order of Saint Elizabeth St. Elisabethenorden
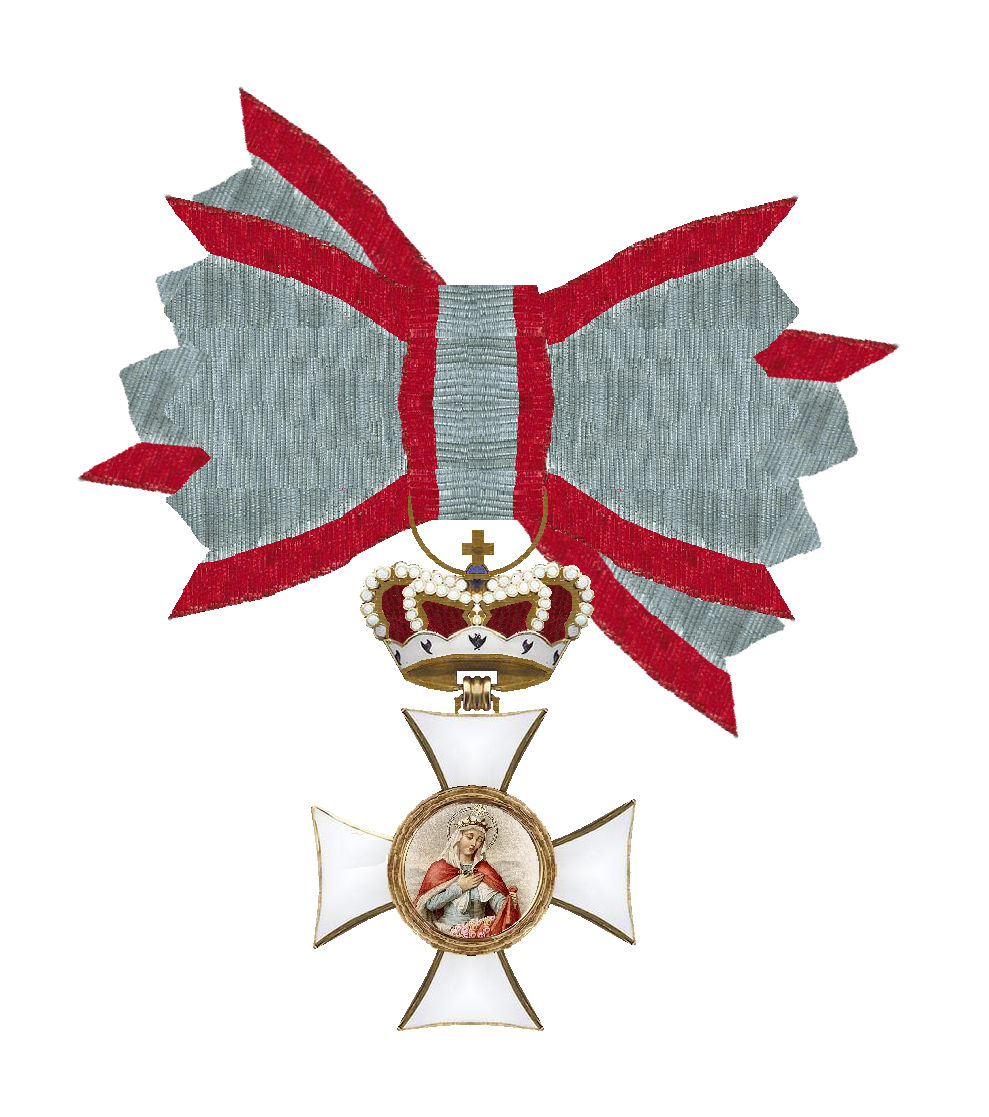
- Badge and ribbon of the order

Awarded by Electoral Palatine Electorate of Bavaria, Kingdom of Bavaria
- Type: ladies order
- Royal house: House of Wittelsbach
- Eligibility: Catholic religion, seize quartiers
- Status: defunct
- Founder: Electress Elisabeth Auguste
- Grades: Dame; Honorary Dame

Statistics
- First induction: 1766
- Last induction: 1976
- Total inductees: 191 Dames; 31 Honorary Dames

Precedence
- Next (higher): Royal Order of Saint Hubert
- Next (lower): Royal Order of Max Joseph
- Equivalent: Royal Order of Saint George for the Defense of the Immaculate Conception
- Ribbon bar of the order

The Order of Saint Elizabeth was an chivalric and charitable order for women in the Electoral Palatinate and the Kingdom of Bavaria.

== History ==
The Order of Saint Elizabeth was founded by Countess Palatine Elisabeth Auguste of Sulzbach, the first spouse of Charles Theodore, Elector of the Palatinate, in honor of Saint Elizabeth of Hungary and as a charitable institution for the poor on 18 October 1766. It was confirmed on 31 January 1767 by Pope Clement XII. Candidates had to proof their and their husbands noble descent until their great-grandparents (seize quartiers). Originally, it was to six ladies, additionally to ladies of princerly houses, the Hofmeisterin (equals the Mistress of the Robes) and ladies-in-waiting of the Grand Mistress. The nomination took place either on Easter or on Saint Elizabeth's Day (19 November), the entrance fee was four ducats.

In 1873, the fee was increased to 500 marks for Bavarian ladies and 1.000 marks for foreigners, while the proof of nobility was lowered to the grandparents. Additionally, the Grand Mistress was enabled to appoint Honorary Dames, i. e. princesses consort, who were dispensed from the fee.

== Insignia ==
The badge was a white enameled cross, representing on one side Saint Elizabeth dispensing charity to the poor, and on the other E A, the initials of the founder. It was worn on the left breast by a blue ribbon with a red border, with inverted colours for Honorary Dames.

== Grand Mistresses ==
The Grand Mistress was appointed by the Elector, later by the King. She had to be a member or the wife of a member of the House of Wittelsbach.

1. 1766–1794 Countess Palatine Elisabeth Auguste of Sulzbach
2. 1794–1831 Princess Maria Amalia of Saxony, widow of Charles II August, Duke of Zweibrücken.
3. 1831–1851 Princess Augusta of Bavaria, sister of Ludwig I of Bavaria
4. 1851–1864 Archduchess Auguste Ferdinande of Austria, wife of Luitpold, Prince Regent of Bavaria
5. 1872–1918 Maria Theresa of Austria-Este, wife of Ludwig, Crown Prince and later King of Bavaria

== Members ==
- Archduchess Marie Valerie of Austria
- Archduchess Gisela of Austria
- Empress Amélie of Leuchtenberg
- Empress Augusta Victoria of Schleswig-Holstein
- Princess Maria Elisabeth of Bavaria
- Princess Marie of Hohenzollern-Sigmaringen; 1900: Wedding Gift in honour of her son.
- Princess Joséphine Caroline of Belgium; 1900: Wedding Gift in honour of her brother.
- Princess Henriette of Belgium; 1900: Wedding Gift in honour of her brother.
- Princess Isabella Antonie of Croÿ
- Princess Louise of Orléans
- Princess Maria di Grazia of Bourbon-Two Sicilies
- Infanta Maria Teresa of Spain
- Infanta Amelia Philippina of Spain
- Princess Eugénie de Leuchtenberg
- Princess Beatrice of Bourbon

== Sources ==
- Tagore, Rajah Sir Sourindro Mohun. The Orders of Knighthood, British and Foreign. Calcutta, India: The Catholic Orphan Press, 1884
