= Countess Palatine Maria Franziska of Sulzbach =

Maria Franziska of Sulzbach
- Countess Palatine of Zweibrücken-Birkenfeld
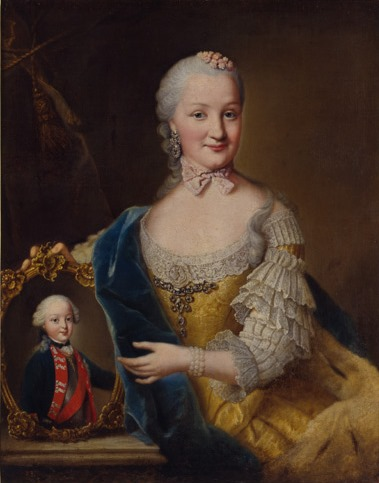
- Portrait by Johann Georg Ziesenis with a miniature of her son Charles II August, c. 1753-1755
- Born: 15 June 1724; Schwetzingen
- Died: 15 November 1794 (aged 70); Sulzbach
- Spouse: Frederick Michael, Count Palatine of Zweibrücken-Birkenfeld (m. 1746; died 1767)
- Issue: Charles II August, Duke of Zweibrücken; Klemens August; Amalie, Queen of Saxony; Maria Anna, Duchess in Bavaria; Maximilian I Joseph of Bavaria
- House: Wittelsbach; Palatinate-Zweibrücken
- Father: Count Palatine Joseph Charles of Sulzbach
- Mother: Countess Palatine Elisabeth Auguste Sofie of Neuburg

Countess Palatine Maria Franziska of Sulzbach (Maria Franziska, Pfalzgräfin von Sulzbach; 15 June 1724 – 15 November 1794) was a Countess Palatine of Zweibrücken-Birkenfeld by marriage to Frederick Michael, Count Palatine of Zweibrücken.

Born in Schwetzingen, she was the fifth child of Count Palatine Joseph Charles of Sulzbach and Countess Palatine Elisabeth Auguste Sofie of Neuburg. Of her six siblings, only she and two older sisters survived to adulthood: Elisabeth Auguste and Maria Anna.

== Life ==
Her father was the designated successor both of his own father Theodore Eustace, Count Palatine of Sulzbach and of his father-in-law Charles III Philip, but he never took possession of his inheritance due to his early death in 1729. Maria Franziska's older sister Elisabeth Auguste later married the next heir of the Palatinate Electorate, Charles Theodore, Elector of Bavaria. After the death of Charles Theodore in February 1799 without surviving legitimate offspring, the Palatinate and Bavaria were inherited by Maria Franziska's youngest son Maximilian IV Joseph (later King Maximilian I Joseph of Bavaria); thus, Maria Franziska became the ancestor of all the Bavarian Kings until 1918 and the still living royal branch of the House of Wittelsbach.

On 6 February 1746, Maria Franziska married Frederick Michael, Count Palatine of Zweibrücken. Around 1760, after having given birth to five children, the relationship with her husband began to deteriorate.

According to herself, she was seduced "by the bad example of the court", and began an affair with an actor from Mannheim. When she became pregnant, Maria Franziska was banished from the court. In Strasbourg, France, she gave birth to a son. She was then confined to semi-detention in a series of monasteries, firstly at the Ursuline in Metz and then to the Augustinians of Bonnevoie in the Duchy of Luxembourg. After the death of her husband in 1767, she was allowed to return to Sulzbach Castle.

Maria Franziska died in Sulzbach and was buried in the local parish church. Her heart was buried separately and since 1983 was located in the Shrine of Our Lady of Altötting.

== Issue ==
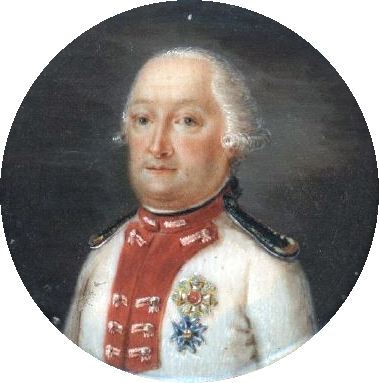
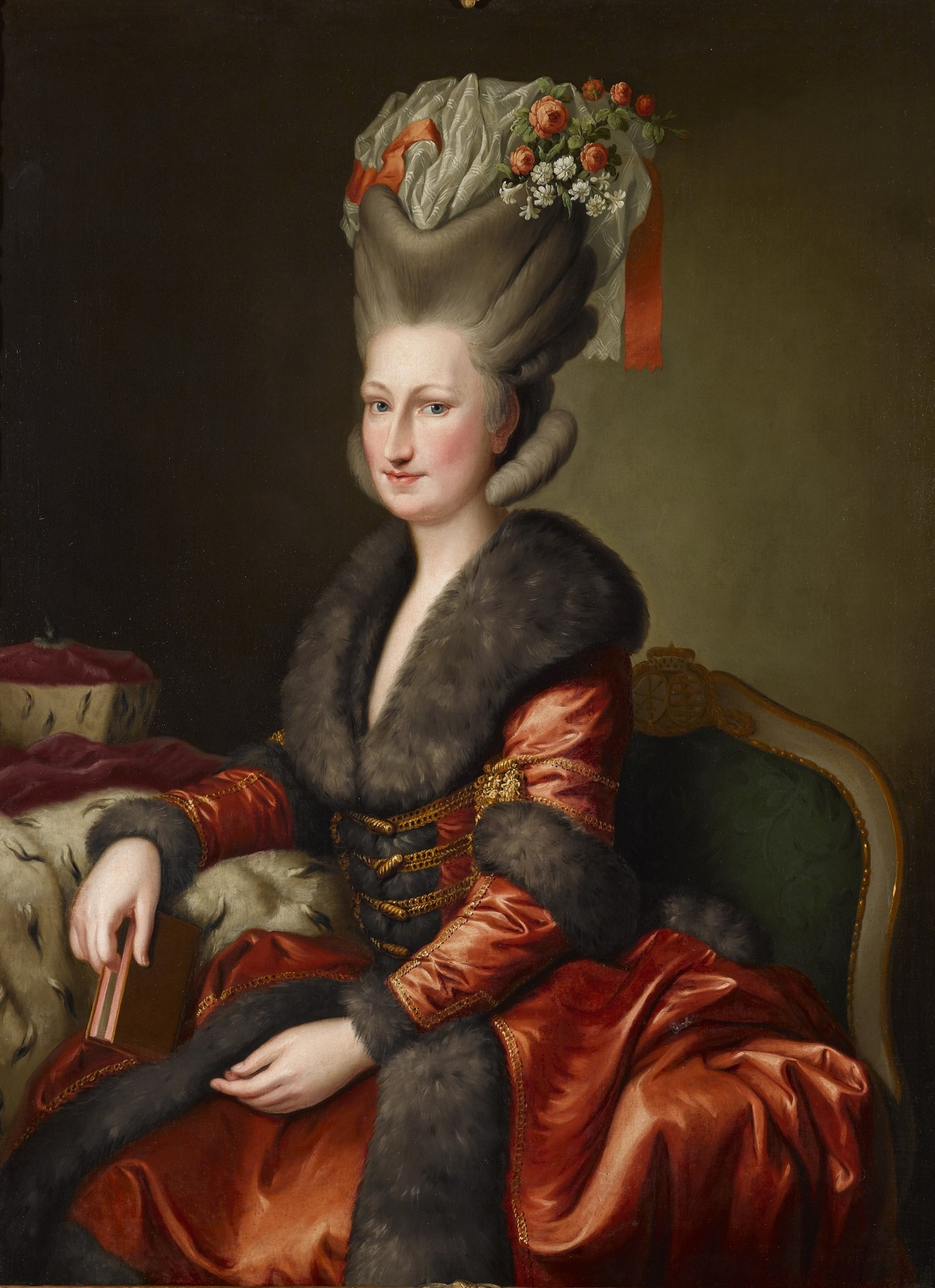
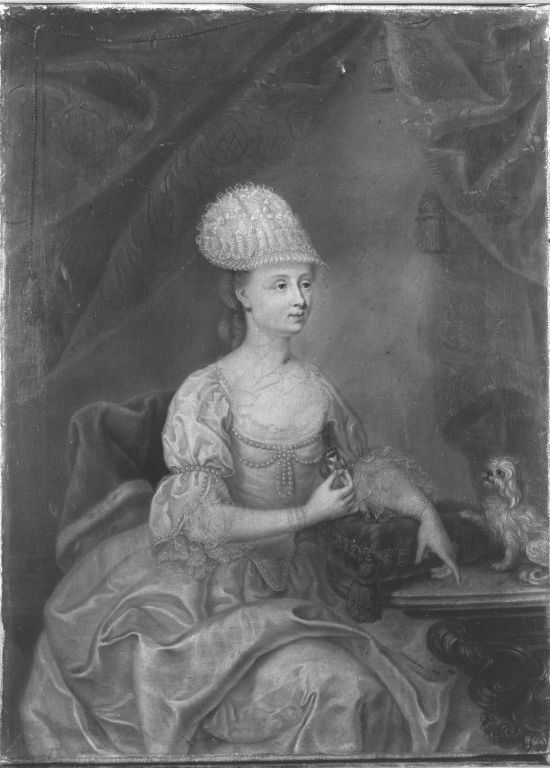
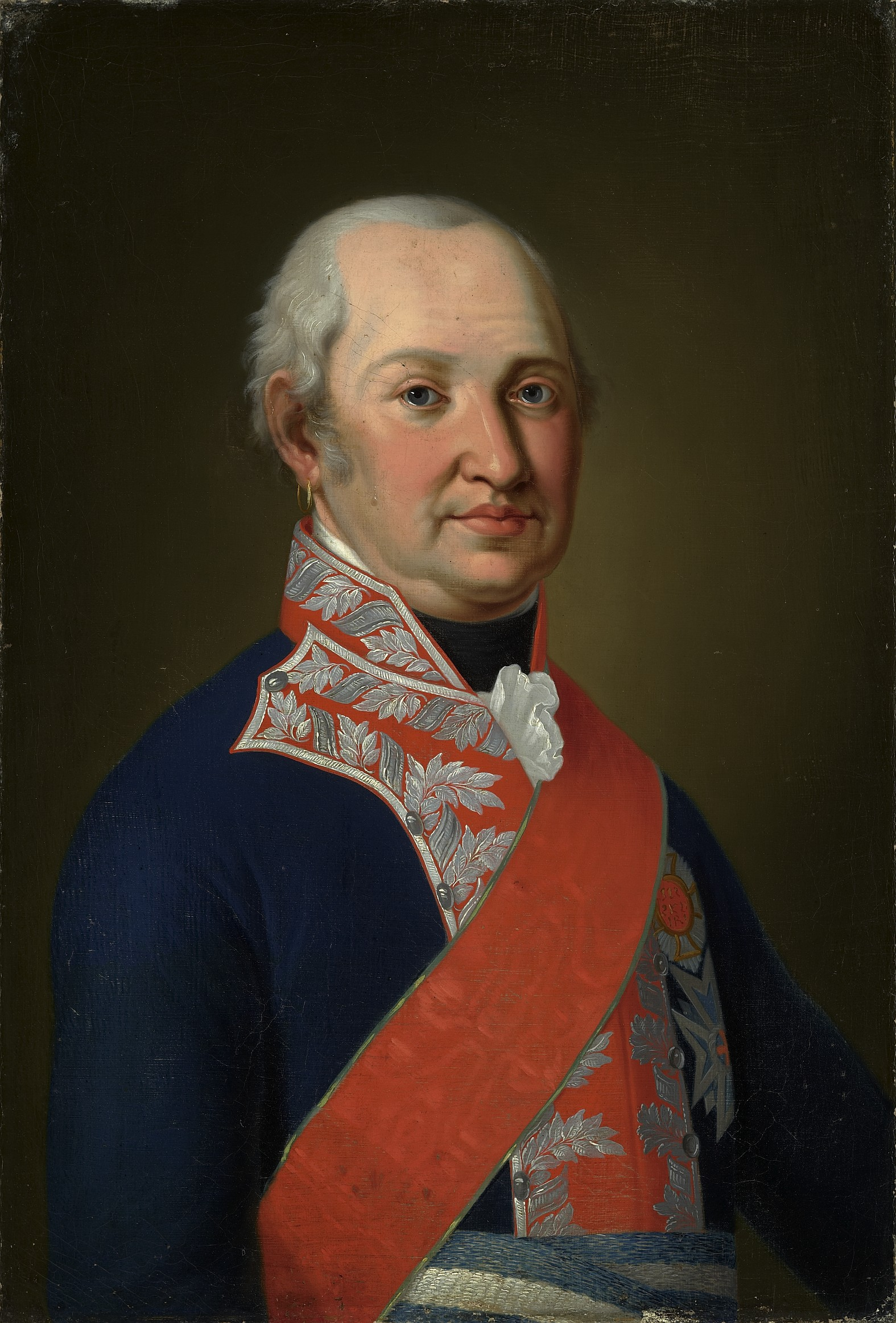
Name	Portrait	Birth	Death	Notes
Charles II August; Duke of Zweibrücken		29 October 1746	1 April 1795	Married in 1774 Princess Maria Amalia of Saxony, no surviving issue.
Klemens August Joseph Friedrich		18 September 1749	19 June 1750	Died in infancy.
Maria Amalia Augusta; Queen consort of Saxony		10 May 1752	15 November 1828	Married in 1769 Elector Frederick Augustus III, had issue.
Maria Anna; Duchess in Bavaria		18 July 1753	4 February 1824	Married in 1780 Duke Wilhelm in Bavaria, had issue.
Maximilian I King of Bavaria		27 May 1756	13 October 1825	Married first in 1785 Princess Augusta Wilhelmine of Hesse-Darmstadt, had issue; married second in 1797 Caroline of Baden, had issue.

== Bibliography ==
- Oskar Klausner: Die Familienzweige der pfälzischen Wittelsbacher. Die ersten Wittelsbacher, die Kurlinie, die Seitenlinien. Editorial Schimper, Heidelberg 1995.
- Karl Weich: Mannheim - das neue Jerusalem. Die Jesuiten in Mannheim 1720–1773. Palatium-Editorial, Mannheim 1997, pp. 142, 151.
