= Blockade of Strasburg =

1659 Polish–Brandenburgian blockade and capture of Strasburg

- Part of the Northern War of 1655–1660
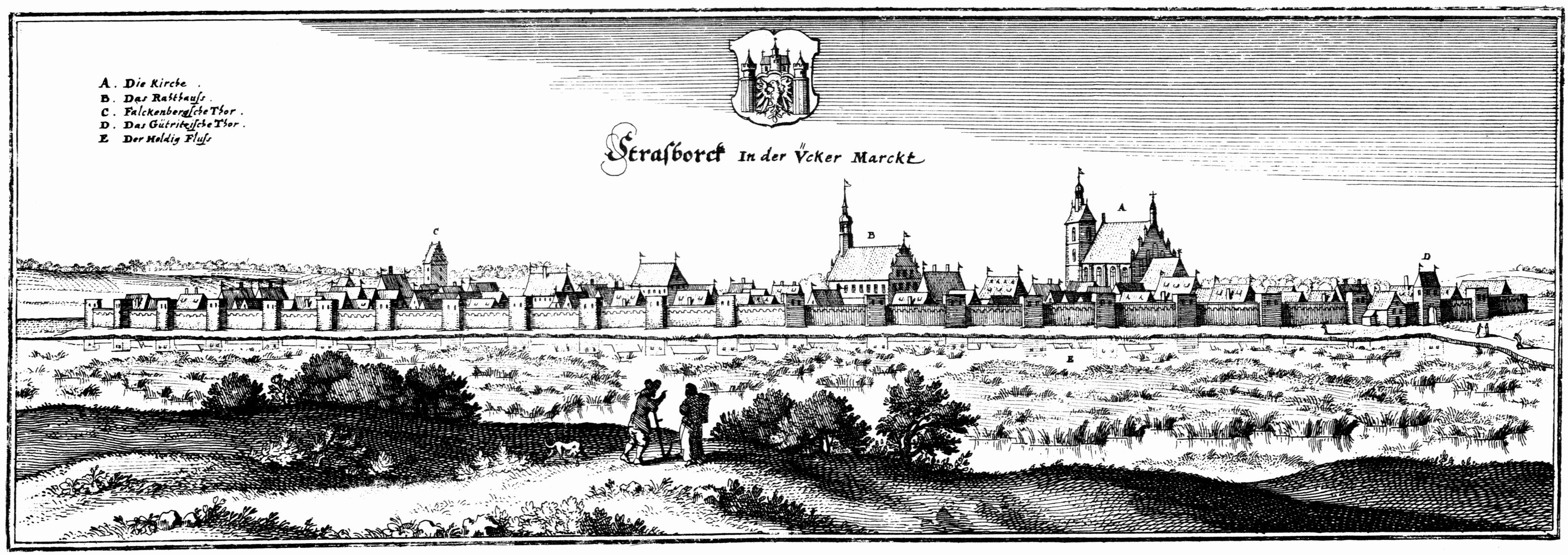
- 1652 engraving of Strasburg by Matthäus Merian the Elder
Date	October – 10 December 1659
Location	Strasburg, Ducal Prussia
Result	Polish–Brandenburgian victory
Territorial changes	Strasburg is captured by the Polish–Brandenburgian forces

Belligerents
(yes) Swedish Empire	Polish–Lithuanian Commonwealth; Brandenburg

Commanders and leaders
(yes) Johann Pleitner (POW)	Henryk Denhoff; Bogusław Radziwiłł

Units involved
(yes) Strasburg garrison	One infantry regiment Several cavalry banners

Strength
100 men	Unknown

Casualties and losses
All survivors captured	Unknown

The blockade of Strasburg occurred from October to 10 December 1659 during the Second Northern War. A Polish–Brandenburgian force under the command of Henryk Denhoff and Bogusław Radziwiłł respectively approached the city in October, cutting off supplies and reinforcements. This forced the commander of the 100 strong Swedish garrison, Johann Pleitner, to surrender. While initially promised free departure to Elbing, he and the survivors were later rounded up by Radziwiłł and made into prisoners of war.

== Blockade ==
In October 1659, a Polish force consisting of one infantry regiment and several banners of cavalry under the command of Henryk Denhoff blockaded Strasburg in Ducal Prussia. This blockade was supported by some Brandenburgian units under the command of Prince Bogusław Radziwiłł. The Swedish garrison inside the city consisted of 100 men under the former fortification officer, Colonel Johann Pleitner. Pleitner had previous experience in siege warfare. Despite this, Strasburg was soon cut off from supplies and reinforcements. This led to his surrender on 10 December in exchange for being allowed departure to Elbing.

== Aftermath ==
Despite the surrender agreement confirming free departure, Radziwiłł did not feel bound by the terms, deciding to round up the surviving Swedes and made them prisoners of war.

== See also ==
- Siege of Toruń (1658) – 1658 battle between the Swedish Empire and the Polish-Lithuanian Commonwealth
- Swedish Offensive into Prussia (1659) – 1659 offensive into Ducal Prussia

== Works cited ==
- von Essen, Michael Fredholm (2023). The Danish Wars, 1657-1660. Charles X's Wars. Vol. 3. Helion & Company. ISBN 9781915113603.
- Podhorodecki, Leszek (1985). Rapier i koncerz: z dziejów wojen polsko-szwedzkich [Rapier and koncerz : from the history of the Polish-Swedish wars] (in Polish). Książka i Wiedza. ISBN 9788305114523.
