= Schloss Oggersheim =

Former palace in Oggersheim, Ludwigshafen, Germany

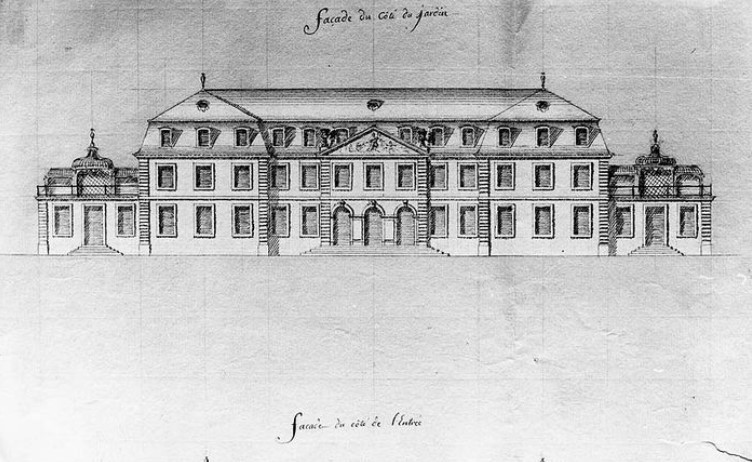
Design of Schloss Oggersheim by Nicolas de Pigage

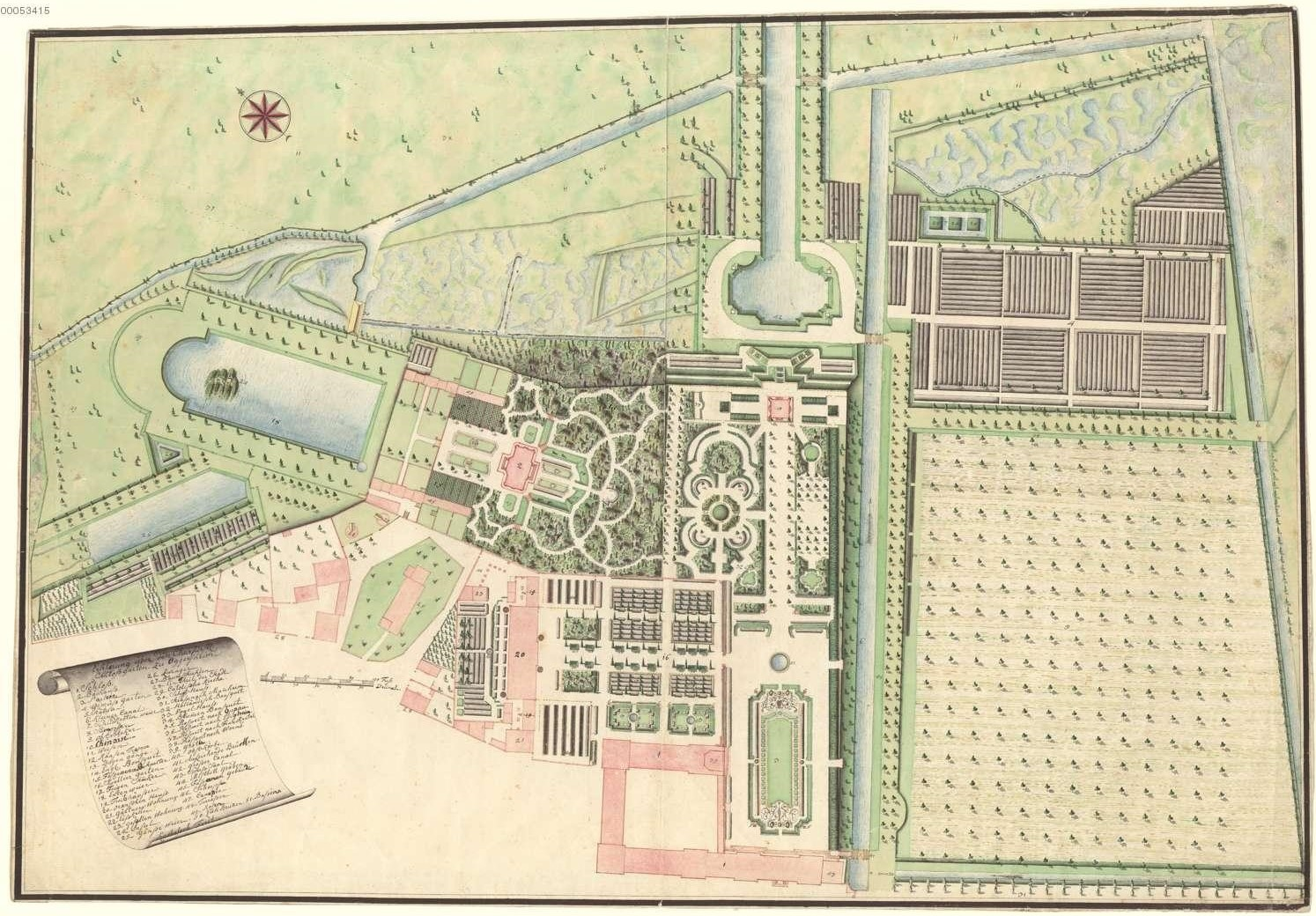
The gardens of Schloss Oggersheim in 1781

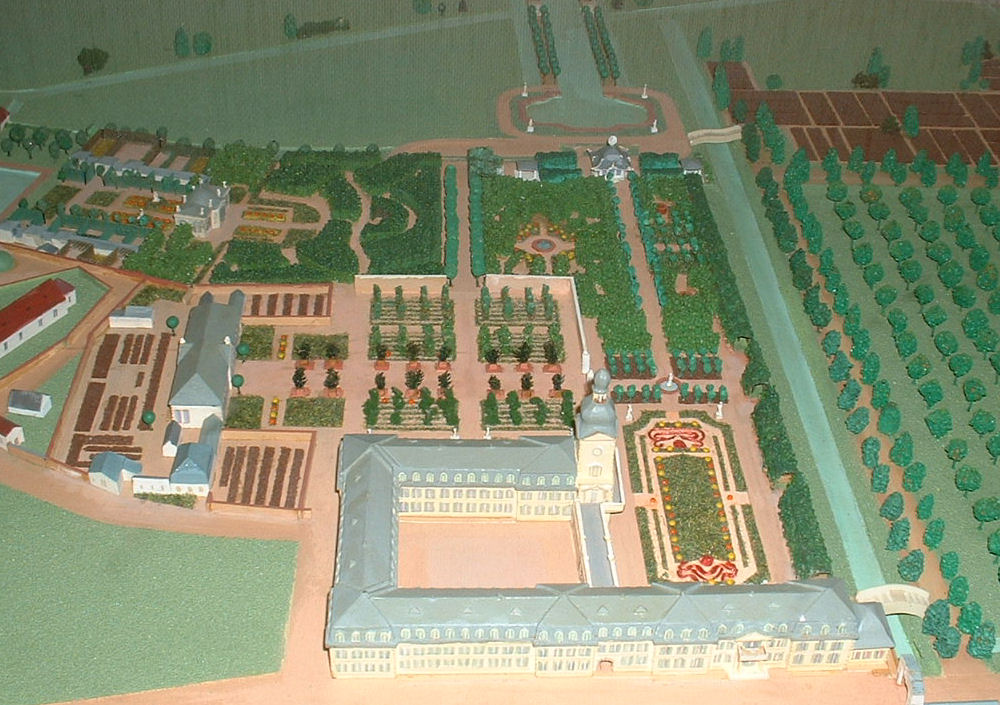
Model of Schloss Oggersheim depicting how the palace looked in its heydays

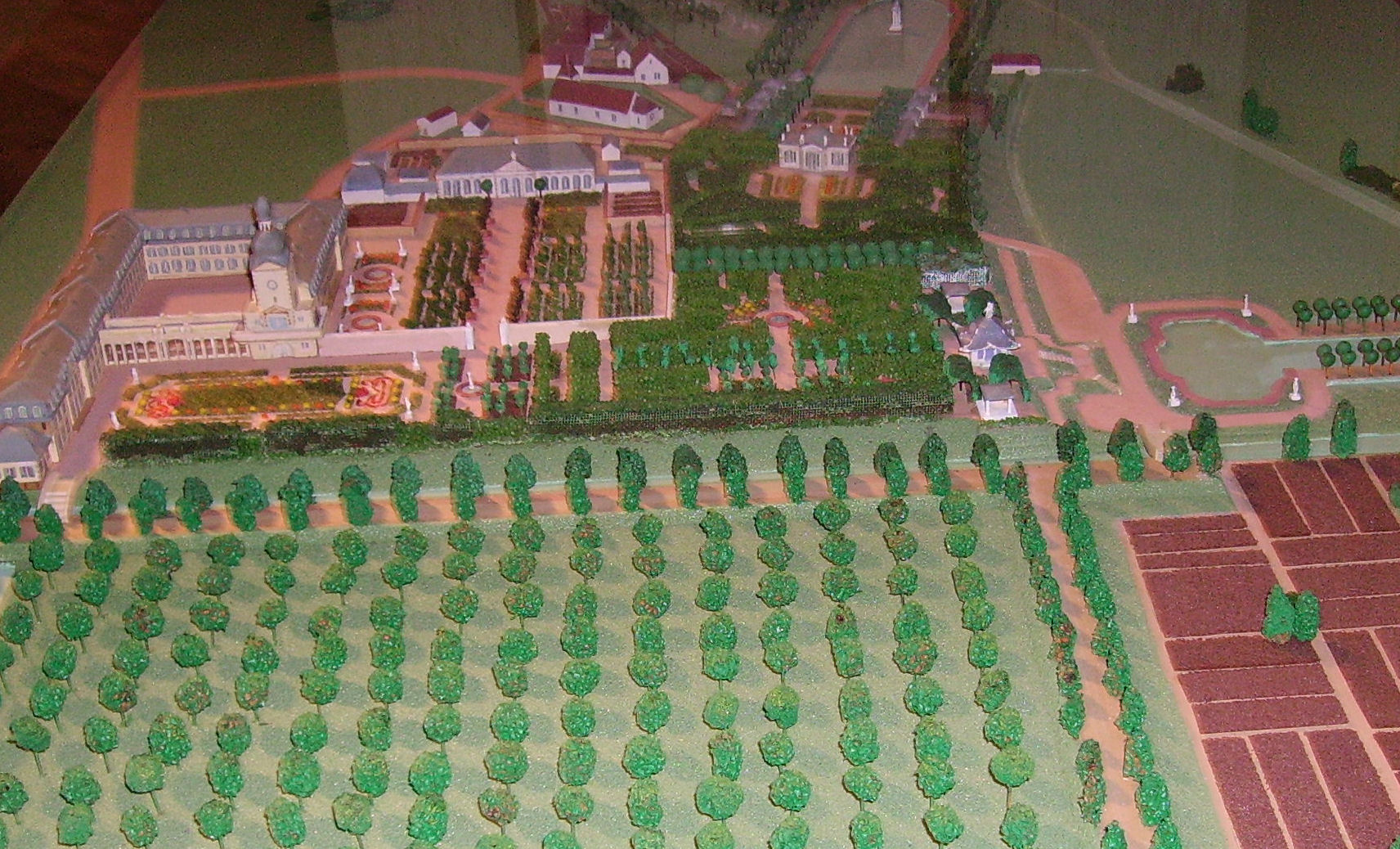
Another view of the model

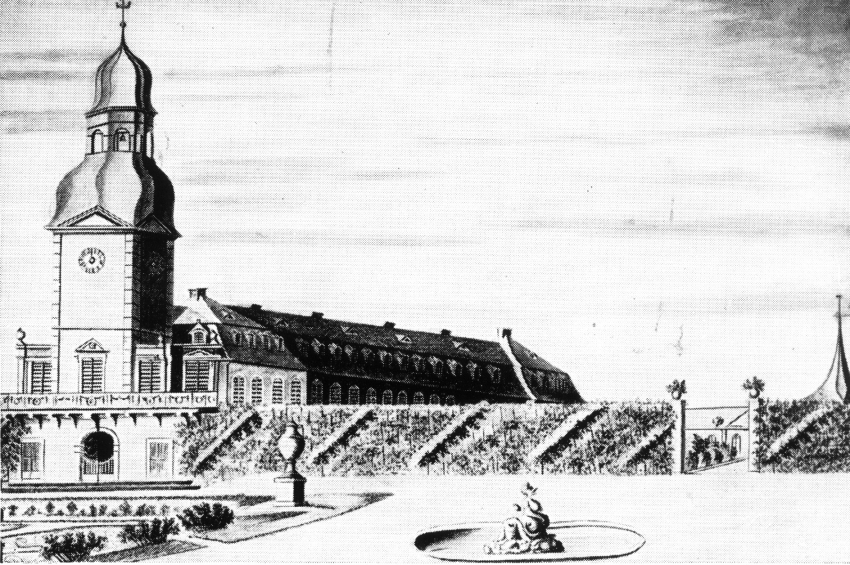
Schloss Oggersheim seen from the garden in 1786

Schloss Oggersheim (German: Schloss Oggersheim) was a rococo Schloss in Oggersheim, part of the city of Ludwigshafen in Rhineland-Palatinate, Germany. It served as a summer palace for the Electress Palatine, Elisabeth Auguste. It was destroyed by French revolutionary troops in 1794. Today, almost nothing remains anymore of Schloss Oggersheim.

== History ==
In 1720, Josep Charles (1694-1729), hereditary prince of Sulzbach constructed a summer palace in Oggersheim. In 1729, a baroque Loreto chapel was added in the palace gardens. When prince Joseph Charles died in 1729, the palace was not used for 22 years until 1752, when Count palatine Frederick Michael of Zweibrücken-Birkenfeld (1724-1767) turned Oggersheim into his summer residence. With help of the architect Nicolas de Pigage (1723-1796), he fully reconstructed the palace between 1752 and 1757. In addition, a large baroque garden in French style was created, including various pavilions, bath houses as well as a large orangery.

In 1767, the Palatine Elector Charles Theodore (1724-1799)) bought Schloss Oggersheim. In 1768, he presented it to his estranged wife Elisabeth Auguste (1721-1794), who lived in the palace with an entourage of around 100 courtiers. Initially, she used Schloss Oggersheim only in the summer months, but later all year round. She made the palace a meeting place for science and arts. Also, there were many festivals including theatre and music performances. When in 1778, Charles Theodore became Prince-Elector of Bavaria and moved his court from Mannheim to Munich, Elisabeth stayed in Oggersheim, which continued to benefit economically from the princely court for a while.

In 1793, French revolutionary troops arrived in the Palatinate, and in the start of 1794 in Oggersheim as well. The old Electress had already fled to Weinheim on the other side of the Rhine. Due to carelessness of the French soldiers living in the palace, the entire complex burned down. The few remaining buildings were also destroyed shortly afterwards.

Today nothing remains of the palace except for the cellar of the cavalier wing, which is covered by a 19th-century building. Furthermore, the Loretto Chapel remains, although by another name, the ‘‘Wallfahrtskirche Mariä Himmelfahrt’’. Electress Elisabeth Auguste had the chapel turned into a church by 1775.

== Literature ==
- Lochner, Karl (1980). Schloss und Gärten zu Oggersheim (1720-1794) (in German). Speyer: Verlag der Pfälzischen Gesellschaft zur Förderung der Wissenschaften. p. 163.
- Gesche, Inga (1996). "Schloss Oggersheim". Nicolas de Pigage 1723-1796 Architekt des Kurfürsten Carl Theodor (in German). Köln: Wienand Verlag. pp. 104–112. ISBN 978-0331537574.

== See also ==
Other palaces of Charles Theodore and Elisabeth Auguste:

- Mannheim Palace
- Schwetzingen Palace
- Schloss Benrath
- Heidelberg Castle
