= Princess Maria Augusta of Saxony =

Saxon princess (1782–1863)

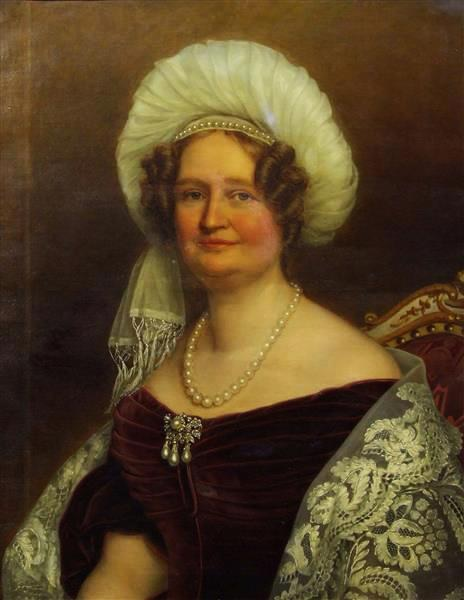
- Portrait, 1839
- Born: 21 June 1782; Dresden
- Died: 14 March 1863 (aged 80); Dresden
- Burial: Dresden Cathedral
- House: Wettin
- Father: Frederick Augustus I of Saxony
- Mother: Amalie of Zweibrücken-Birkenfeld

Maria Augusta Nepomucena Antonia Francisca Xaveria Aloysia (German: Maria Augusta Nepomucena Antonia Franziska Xaveria Aloysia; Polish: Maria Augusta Nepomucena Antonia Franciszka Ksaweria Alojzia) of Saxony (21 June 1782 – 14 March 1863) was Princess of Saxony. Between 1791 and 1795, she played a political role as the potential successor to the Polish throne. She was considered a potential heir to the Duchy of Warsaw in 1807-1813.

== Life ==
Maria Augusta was a member of the House of Wettin as the daughter of Frederick Augustus I of Saxony and Amalie of Zweibrücken-Birkenfeld.

=== Potential heir to the Polish throne ===
Her father, Frederick Augustus, was the King of Saxony. She was his only child to reach adulthood. Her family had a claim to the throne of Poland (Polish–Lithuanian Commonwealth) and the Constitution of 3 May 1791 named her as a potential successor to the Polish throne if the male line of the Wettin family were to end.

In Poland, she was called the "infanta of Poland" and a marriage for her considered with Prince Stanisław Poniatowski, a nephew of the Polish king. Her father's hesitation in accepting this proposal and the subsequent Partitions of Poland in 1793-1795 prevented this from occurring.

After the formation of the Duchy of Warsaw, her father was named ruling duke of the Duchy of Warsaw, and she was widely regarded as her father's successor there, despite the fact that the Duchy was bound by Salic law.

Plans to marry her to a family that would be able to strengthen its claim on Poland failed, as none of the contemporary powers wanted to strengthen Saxony or restore the Polish kingdom. One of her potential suitors was Prince Józef Poniatowski, the cousin of her earlier suggested spouse Stanisław.
