= Carlo Grua =

Italian composer

Carlo Luigi Pietro Grua (c. 1700 – 11 April 1773) was an Italian composer who is best known for his position as Kapellmeister for the Electoral Court at the German city of Mannheim.

Born in Milan, he was raised to the position in 1733 by Elector Karl III Philip, and held the position until his death.

His compositions during his tenure included sacred works, oratorios, and opera.

Grua died in Mannheim in 1773.

== Works ==
=== Opera ===
- Romolo e Tazio (1722), libretto by Vincenzo Cassani
- Meride (1742), libretto by G. C. Pasquini.
- La clemenza di Tito (1748), libretto by Metastasio.

=== Oratorios ===
- La conversione di. S. Ignazio (1740), text by L. Santorini
- Betsabea, ovvero il pentimento di David (1741)
- Jaele (1741), text by L. Santorini
- Il figliuol prodigo (1742, rev. 1749), text by G. C. Pasquini
- La missione sacerdotale (1746), text by L. Santorini
- S. Elena al Calvario (1750), text by Metastasio
- La passione di Giesu Christo nostro Signore (1754), text by Metastasio
