= Clemens Franz de Paula von Bayern =

German nobleman (1722–1770)

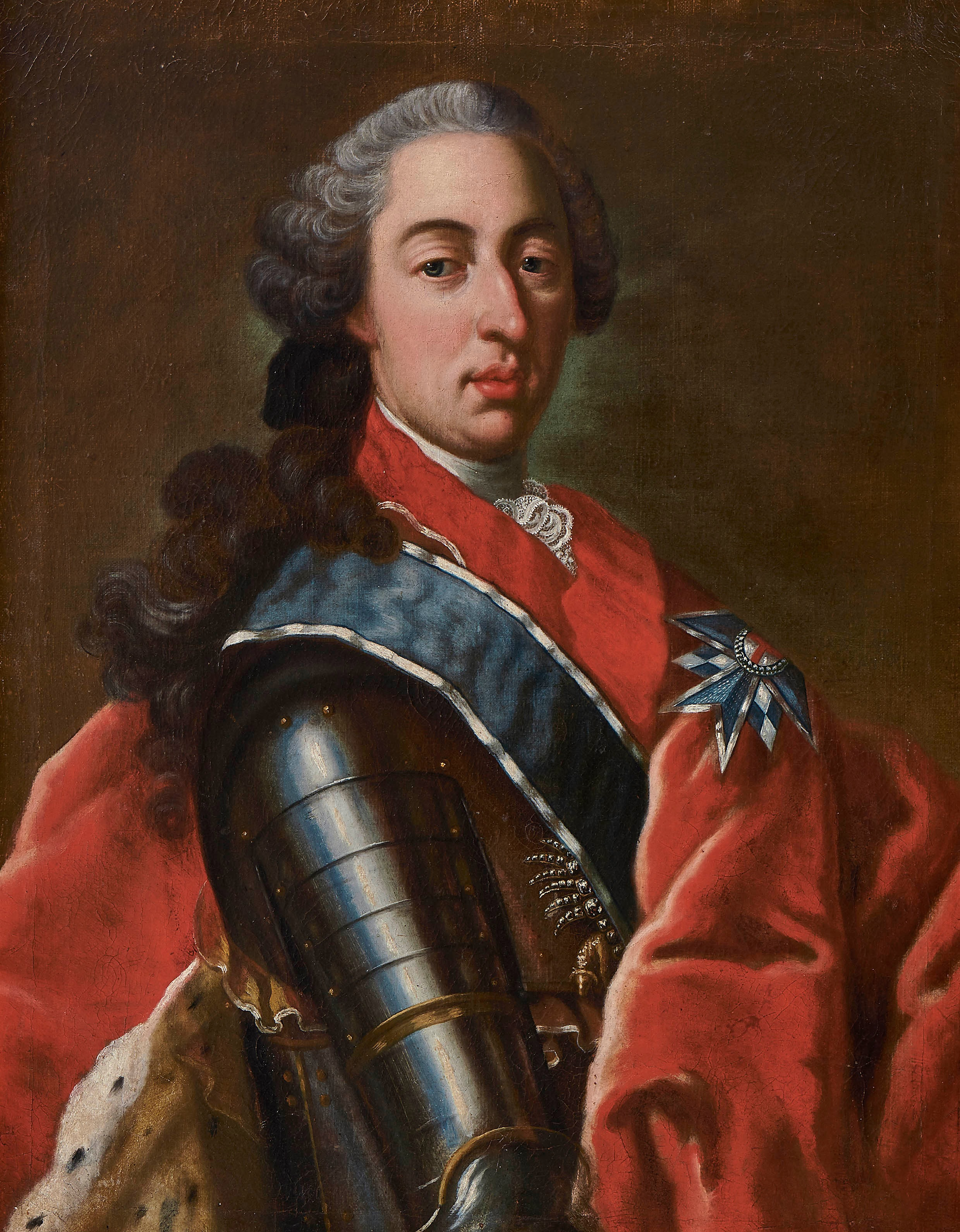
Klemens Franz de Paula

Klemens Franz de Paula, Prince of Bavaria (Munich, 19 April 1722 – Munich, 6 August 1770) was hereditary prince and Duke of Bavaria. He was the son of the Imperial Field Marshal, Ferdinand of Bavaria (1699–1738), and the grandson of Maximilian II Emanuel, Elector of Bavaria.

On 17 January 1742, he married Maria Anna, Countess Palatine of Sulzbach (1722–1790), daughter of Joseph Charles of Bavaria, Count Palatine and Prince Hereditary of Sulzbach and Elizabeth Augusta Sofie of Neuburg. They had one son and three daughters, all of them died shortly after birth:

- Duchess Maria of Bavaria (b. and d. 30 September 1748) died at birth.
- A son (b. and d. 31 May 1754).
- Duchess Maria Anna of Bavaria (b. and d. 28 January 1755) died at birth.
- A daughter (b. and d. 23 June 1756).

If one of their sons had lived, he would have become Prince-elector of Bavaria in 1777 after the death of Maximilian III Joseph.

== Sources ==
- Oskar Klausner (ed.): Die Familie der Pfälzischen Wittelsbacher. Staatliches Liegenschaftsamt Heidelberg, 1995.
