= Frederick Michael, Count Palatine of Zweibrücken =

Frederick Michael
- Count Palatine of Zweibrücken
- Born: 27 February 1724; Ribeauvillé, Alsace
- Died: 15 August 1767 (aged 43); Schwetzingen
- Burial: St. Michael's Church, Munich
- Spouse: Countess Palatine Maria Franziska of Sulzbach (m. 1746)
- Issue: Charles II August, Duke of Zweibrücken; Klemens August; Amalia Augusta, Queen of Saxony; Maria Anna, Duchess in Bavaria; Maximilian I, King of Bavaria; Karl Friedrich Stephan, Count of Otting and Fünfstetten (ill.)
- House: Wittelsbach
- Father: Christian III, Count Palatine of Zweibrücken
- Mother: Caroline of Nassau-Saarbrücken

Frederick Michael, Count Palatine of Zweibrücken-Birkenfeld (27 February 1724 – 15 August 1767) was a member of the Wittelsbach dynasty. He was the son of Christian III of Palatinate-Zweibrücken and Caroline of Nassau-Saarbrücken and a member of the House of Palatinate-Zweibrücken-Birkenfeld, a branch of the House of Wittelsbach. He was the father of the Bavarian King Maximilian I Joseph. Furthermore, he engaged Nicolas de Pigage to reconstruct his summer palace in Oggersheim.

== Seven Years' War ==
Frederick Michael was Palatine Fieldmarshal, Governor of Mannheim and finally in 1758 as Fieldmarshal of the Holy Roman Empire commander-in-chief of the Reichsarmee in the Seven Years' War against Frederick the Great. After the Battle of Rossbach, he managed to build up the whipped imperial army again, for which he received the Grand Cross of the Military Order of Maria Theresa. In the fall of 1758 he invaded Saxony, took the fortress Sonnenstein and besieged Leipzig. The following year, Leipzig, Torgau, Wittenberg and Dresden were conquered. He secured Marshal Daun in the Battle of Maxen and was defeated in the Battle of Strehla. 1761, he resigned from his post and handed over the imperial troops to Field Marshal Johann von Serbelloni. After the peace of Hubertusburg Friedrich Michael received the General Command in Bohemia and later became president of the secret military conference.

== Family ==
He married Maria Franziska of Sulzbach, a granddaughter of Charles III Philip, Elector Palatine, and had five children:

- Karl II August Christian (1746 – 1795)
- Klemens August Joseph Friedrich (1749 – 1750)
- Maria Amalie Auguste (1752 – 1828), Married Frederick Augustus I, King of Saxony
- Maria Anna (1753 – 1824), Married Duke Wilhelm in Bavaria.
- Maximilian I (1756 – 1825), King of Bavaria

He also had an illegitimate son with his mistress, Louise Cheveau:

- Karl Friedrich Stephan (1767 – 1834), Baron of Schönfeld (1813), Count of Otting and Fünfstetten (1817). His daughter Luise married August von Senarclens de Grancy.

== Ancestry ==
Ancestors of Frederick Michael, Count Palatine of Zweibrücken

8. Christian I, Count Palatine of Birkenfeld-Bischweiler
4. Christian II, Count Palatine of Zweibrücken-Birkenfeld
9. Countess Palatine Magdalene Catherine of Zweibrücken
2. Christian III, Count Palatine of Zweibrücken
10. Johann Jakob, Count of Rappoltstein
5. Countess Katharina Agathe of Rappoltstein
11. Wild- and Rhinegravine Anna Claudia of Salm-Kyrburg
1. Frederick Michael, Count Palatine of Zweibrücken
12. Gustav Adolph, Count of Nassau-Saarbrücken
6. Louis Crato, Count of Nassau-Saarbrücken
13. Countess Eleonore Claire of Hohenlohe-Neuenstein
3. Caroline of Nassau-Saarbrücken
14. Henry Frederick, Count of Hohenlohe-Langenburg
7. Princess Philippine Henriette of Hohenlohe-Langenburg
15. Countess Juliana Dorothea of Castell-Remlingen

== Bibliography ==
- Wilhelm Edler von Janko: Friedrich Michael (1.Art.). In: Allgemeine Deutsche Biographie (ADB). Band 7, Duncker & Humblot, Leipzig 1877, p. 627.
- Constantin von Wurzbach: Zweybrück-Birkenfeld, Friedrich Michael Pfalzgraf am Rhein. In: Biographisches Lexikon des Kaiserthums Oesterreich. Band 60. Verlag L. C. Zamarski, Wien 1891, p. 335 f.
- Richard Du Moulin Eckart: Pfalzgraf Friedrich Michael von Zweibrücken, Cotta, 1892
- Karl Theodor von Heigel: Friedrich Michael (2.Art.). In: Allgemeine Deutsche Biographie (ADB). Band 49, Duncker & Humblot, Leipzig 1904, p. 134–139.
- Artur Brabant: Das Heilige römische Reich teutscher Nation im Kampf mit Friedrich dem grossen, Paetel, 1911, p. 41 ff.
- Lebenslust und Frömmigkeit, Kurfürst Carl Theodor zwischen Barock und Aufklärung, Handbuch, 1999 ISBN 3-7917-1679-4 y Ausstellungskatalog ISBN 3-7917-1679-4
