= Bogusław Radziwiłł =

Polish nobleman (1620–1669)

- Grand Hetman of Swedish Lithuania
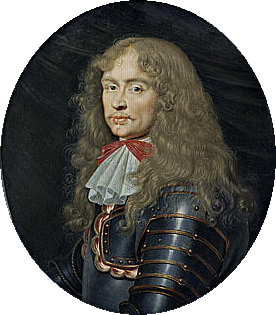
- Born: 3 May 1620; Gdańsk (Danzig), Crown of Poland
- Died: 31 December 1669 (aged 49); Königsberg, Ducal Prussia
- Spouse: Anna Maria Radziwiłł
- Issue: Ludwika Karolina Radziwiłł
- Parents: Janusz Radziwiłł; Elisabeth Sophia of Brandenburg

Bogusław Radziwiłł (Lithuanian: Boguslavas Radvila; 3 May 1620 – 31 December 1669) was a Polish–Lithuanian princely magnate and a member of the szlachta (nobility). He belonged to the Radziwiłł magnate family. By birth he was an Imperial Prince of the Holy Roman Empire. He was a descendant of the famous knight, Zawisza the Black. Following the death of Janusz Radziwiłł, he briefly served as Grand Hetman of Swedish Lithuania.

== Biography ==
Born of the mightiest and highest resident family of the Grand Duchy of Lithuania (as well as a blood descendant of King Casimir IV of Poland, and Kęstutis and Vytautas, monarchs of Lithuania), Radziwiłł was the owner of Biržai, Dubingiai, Słuck, and Kopyta, the great Standard-bearer of Lithuania since 1638, the Master of the Stables of Lithuania since 1648, and the Starost of Bar. Radziwiłł was Governor of the Duchy of Prussia (Brandenburg-Prussia) (generalny gubernator Prus Książęcych) since 1657.

From 1637 to 1648 Radziwiłł studied abroad, in Germany, Netherlands, England, and France.

For several decades, the interests between the Radziwiłł family and the Polish–Lithuanian Commonwealth had begun to drift apart, as Radziwłł were less satisfied with the magnate status of the family and its immense wealth and began craving more political power.

Together with his cousin Janusz Radziwiłł in 1654 during The Deluge, or Swedish invasion of Poland, Bogusław Radziwiłł began negotiations with King Charles X Gustav of Sweden aimed at breaking the Commonwealth and the Polish–Lithuanian union. They signed a treaty according to which the Swedish–Lithuanian union was founded and the Radziwiłłs were to rule over two duchies carved up from the lands of the Grand Duchy of Lithuania (this was also confirmed in another treaty, the treaty of Radnot).

The Swedish defeat and eventual retreat from the territories of the Commonwealth abruptly ended the plans of Janusz and Bogusław. The former died at Tykocin Castle besieged by forces loyal to the Commonwealth, while Bogusław retreated with his forces to Prussia, where he supported Frederick William, Elector of Brandenburg, against the Polish king. In the Battle of Prostki on 8 October 1656, Bogusław's forces were decimated by the Commonwealth forces under Hetman Wincenty Korwin Gosiewski. Radziwiłł himself was captured by the Tatars, who initially enslaved him and wanted to transport him to Crimea. After fierce discussions with the Tatar commanders, he was handed over to Gosiewski.

From October to 10 December 1659, he participated in the successful blockade and capture of Strasburg in conjunction with a Polish–Lithuanian force.

Boguslaw married Anna Maria Radziwiłł, the only daughter of his relative and collaborator, the late prince Janusz. In turn, this couple had only one surviving child, a daughter, Ludwika Karolina Radziwiłł. Both Bogusław's and Janusz's lines of the Radziwiłł family became extinct by the next generation.

In Poland it is believed that Bogusław's and Janusz's only lasting achievement was to tarnish the Radziwiłł family name for years to come with their treason, eclipsing the deeds of other Radziwiłłs like Michał Kazimierz Radziwiłł, who fought for the Crown and the Commonwealth against the Swedes. Bogusław is the archvillain in a novel by Henryk Sienkiewicz, The Deluge, which is mandatory school reading in Poland, and is also the basis for a very popular eponymous film.

Bogusław died in exile in Königsberg in Brandenburg-Prussia. He was the last Calvinist male member of his family. His estates and the task to protect the Polish Reformed Church passed to his only daughter, Princess Ludwika Karolina.

== Works cited ==
- von Essen, Michael Fredholm (2023). The Danish Wars, 1657-1660. Charles X's Wars. Vol. 3. Helion & Company. ISBN 9781915113603.
