= Elisabeth Auguste Sofie of Neuburg =

Hereditary Princess of Sulzbach (1693‍–‍1728)

- Hereditary Princess of Sulzbach
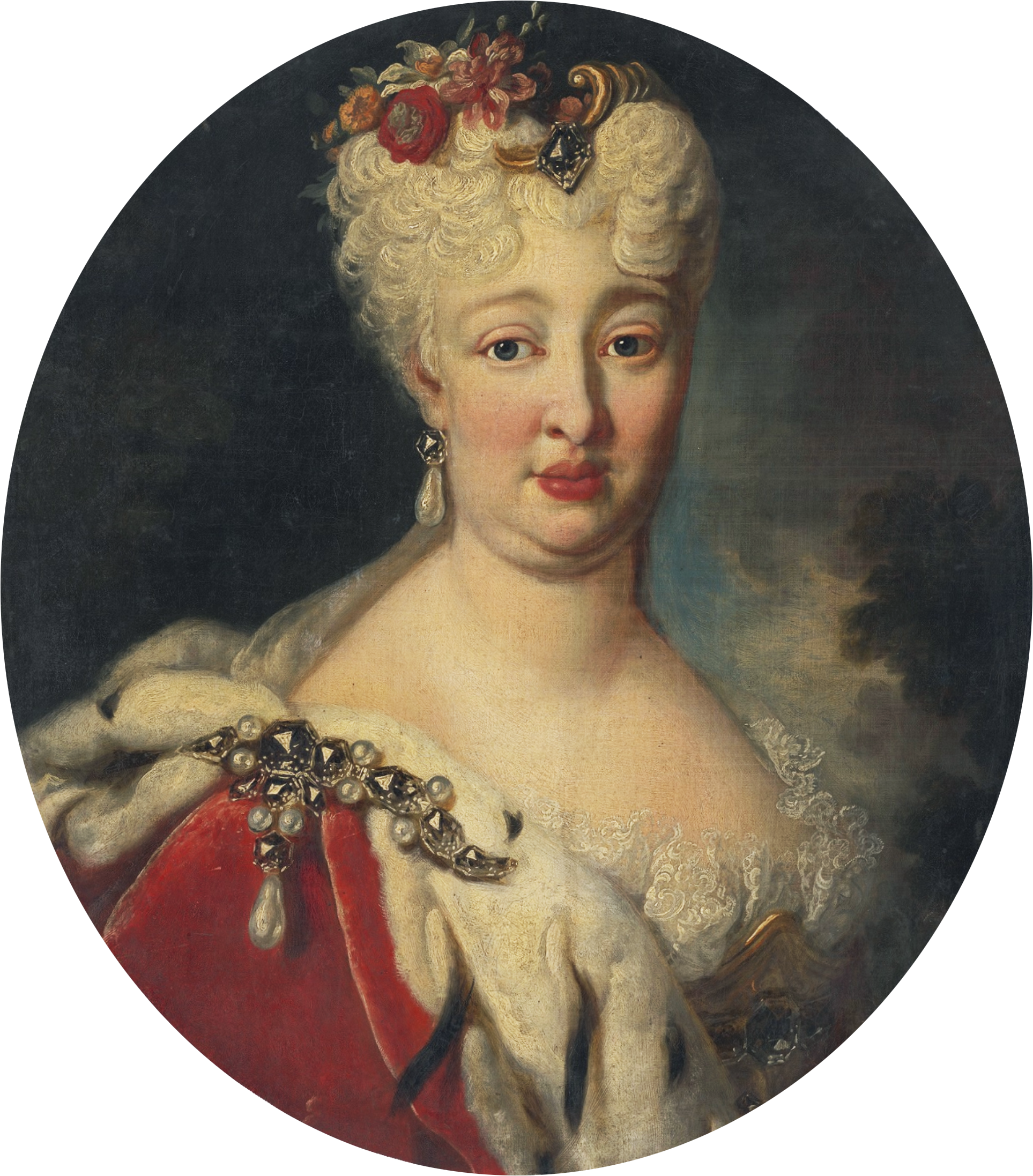
- Portrait by Pierre Goudreaux, 1725
- Born: 17 March 1693
- Died: 30 January 1728 (aged 34)
- Spouse: Count Palatine Joseph Charles of Sulzbach (m. 1717)
- Issue: 7, including: Elizabeth Auguste, Electress of Bavaria; Maria Anna, Duchess of Bavaria; Maria Franziska, Countess Palatine of Zweibrücken-Birkenfeld
- House: Wittelsbach
- Father: Charles III Philip, Elector Palatine
- Mother: Ludwika Karolina Radziwiłł

Elisabeth Auguste of Neuburg (Elisabeth Auguste Sofie; 1693‍–‍1728) was the only surviving child of Charles III Philip, Elector Palatine. The Palatinate-Neuburg line became extinct with her father and was succeeded by the Palatinate-Sulzbach line. Her sons with Count Palatine Joseph Charles of Sulzbach would have been the indisputable heirs to the Electorate of the Palatinate, but they all died in infancy. By her marriage, she became Hereditary Princess of Sulzbach.

== Life ==
Of Charles Philip's six children (five daughters and one stillborn son), Elisabeth Auguste was the only one to reach adulthood. She was the third daughter of Charles III Philip, then Count Palatine of Neuburg, and his first wife, Ludwika Karolina Radziwiłł. Her mother died in childbirth when Elisabeth Auguste was about two years old, and her father later remarried to Princess Teresa Lubomirska.

In 1716, her father succeeded his brother Johann Wilhelm as the Elector of the Palatinate. By then it was evident that the Palatinate-Neuburg line (established by two grandsons of Duke George of Bavaria, Otto Henry and Philip) would become extinct, as Charles III Philip and his brothers had all failed to produce a legitimate male heir. It was also obvious that the related Palatinate-Sulzbach line would succeed them. Joseph Charles, the eldest son of the Count Palatine of Sulzbach, was the clear heir.

On 2 May 1717, Elisabeth Auguste married Joseph Charles in a move that united the two lines. Their sons were to be the indisputable heirs of the Electorate of the Palatinate, preventing another succession war. However, all them died in infancy and only three daughters survived.

Elisabeth Auguste died in childbirth in 1728. Her husband died the following year in Oggersheim. The inheritance of the Electorate of the Palatinate passed to her husband's brother, John Christian Joseph's family. Upon her father's death in 1742, her husband's nephew, Charles Theodore, became Elector. Their daughter, also named Elizabeth Augusta, married Charles Theodore and became Electress.

== Issue ==
She was married in Innsbruck in 1717 to Count Palatine Joseph Charles Emanuel August of Sulzbach, son of Theodore Eustace of Sulzbach and Maria Eleonore of Hesse-Rotenburg. They had the following children:

- Charles Philip (1718‍–‍1724)
- Innocenza Maria (1719‍–‍1719)
- Elisabeth Auguste (1721‍–‍1794); married Charles Theodore, Elector of Bavaria
- Maria Anna (1722‍–‍1790); married Clement, Duke of Bavaria and Count Palatine
- Maria Francisca (1724‍–‍1794); married Frederick Michael, second son of Christian III, Duke of Zweibrücken
- Charles Philip August (1725‍–‍1728)
- a son, Pfalzgraf von der Pfalz (1728‍–‍1728)

Through her daughter Maria Francisca, she was a grandmother of Maximilian I Joseph of Bavaria. He succeeded Charles Theodore as Elector Palatine in 1799.
