= Ludwika Karolina Radziwiłł =

Princess Ludwika Karolina Radziwiłł
- Margravine consort of Brandenburg; Countess Palatine of Neuberg
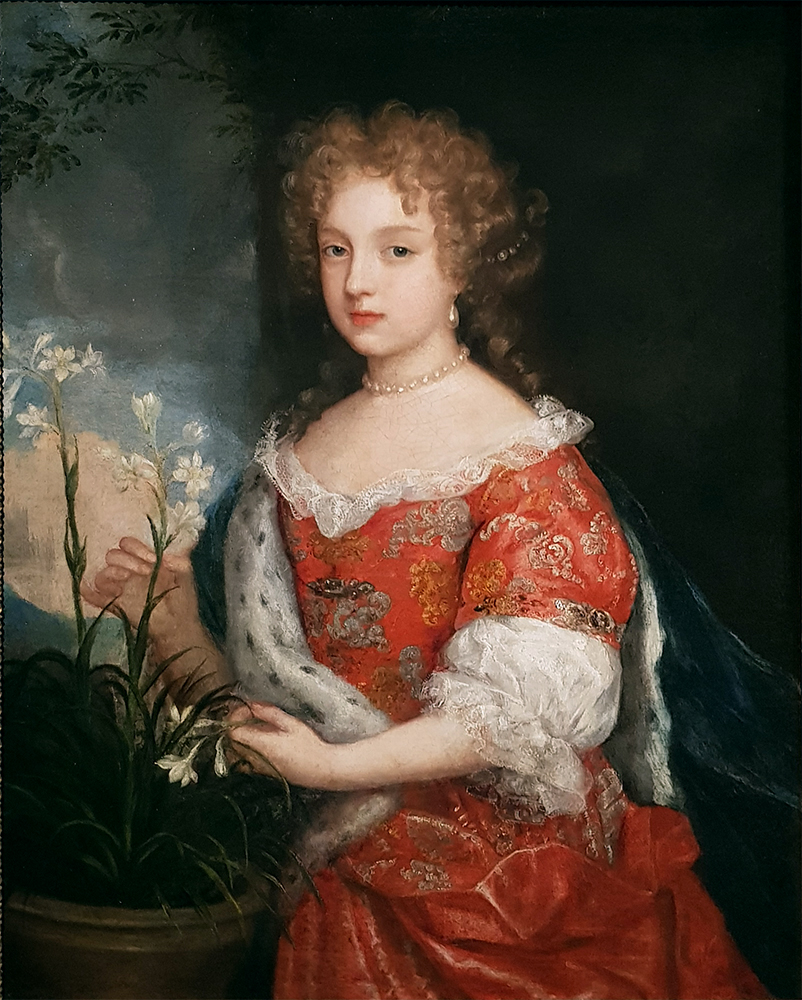
- Portrait by an anonymous artist, c. 1681
- Born: 27 February 1667; Königsberg, Ducal Prussia
- Died: 25 March 1695 (aged 28); Brzeg
- Spouse: Margrave Louis of Brandenburg (m. 1681; died 1687) Charles III Philip, Elector Palatine (m. 1688)
- Issue among others...: Countess Palatine Leopoldine Eleonore; Countess Palatine Maria Anna; Elizabeth Augusta Sophie, Hereditary Princess of Sulzbach
- House: Radziwiłł
- Father: Bogusław Radziwiłł
- Mother: Anna Maria Radziwiłł

Princess Ludwika Karolina Radziwiłł (Lithuanian: Liudvika Karolina Radvilaitė; 27 February 1667 – 25 March 1695) was a magnate Princess of the Grand Duchy of Lithuania in the Polish–Lithuanian Commonwealth and an active reformer.

== Life ==
Ludwika Karolina Radziwiłł was born in Königsberg in the Duchy of Prussia. A member of the Radziwiłł family, she was the last agnatic-line member of the most prominent Calvinists of Lithuania, and a descendant of the Gediminids and Jagiellons. Radziwiłł inherited Dubingiai, Slutsk and many other lands from her father Prince Bogusław Radziwiłł. Her mother was an heiress in her own right and brought much wealth including the duchies of Kėdainiai and Biržai. Ludwika Karolina Radziwiłł's death in Brieg in 1695 marks the end of the Biržai-Dubingiai Radziwiłł family line. She was the last Radziwiłł to own Biržai Castle and Dubingiai Castle with their lands.

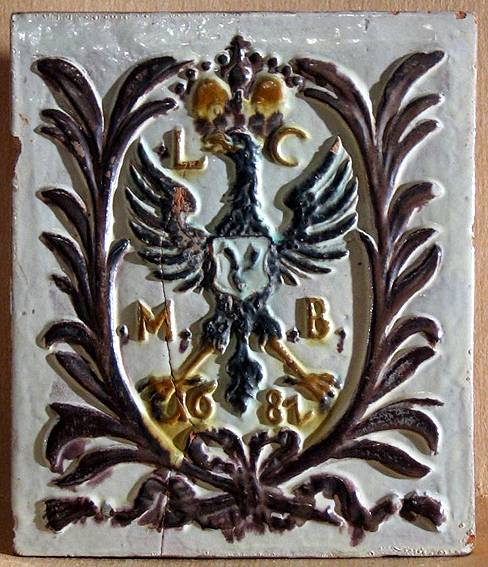
A tile with the emblem and initials of Ludwika Karolina, Biržai Castle.

Her father, Prince Bogusław Radziwiłł was the son of Janusz Radziwill (1579–1620) and Elisabeth Sophie of Brandenburg, and along with his cousin (and future father-in-law) Janusz Radziwiłł (1612–55) played a dramatic and treacherous role in The Deluge, or Swedish invasion of Poland. Following the Swedish retreat and Polish resurgence, Bogusław Radziwiłł chose exile in Brandenburg-Prussia, with his mother's family. His wife and Ludwika Karolina's mother, Anna Maria Radziwiłł, the only child and heiress of Janusz Radziwiłł died shortly after giving birth to Ludwika Karolina. Bogusław followed less than two years later, leaving the infant Radziwiłł orphaned and very wealthy. Her guardianship was entrusted to her father's cousin and host (and her future father-in-law) Frederick William, Elector of Brandenburg.

Radziwiłł spent most of her life in Berlin and Königsberg, but paid much attention to her lands in the grand duchy. Like her father, she funded the printing of books in the Lithuanian language, and supported education and Calvinist parishes. She established scholarships for Lithuanian students of theology in the universities of Königsberg, Frankfurt (Oder), and Berlin. Radziwiłł financed the issue of the catechism and primer in the Lithuanian language, Pradzia pamoksla del mazu Weykialu…, which was printed in Königsberg in 1680. It was the second primer intended for schools following the Catechism by Martynas Mažvydas.

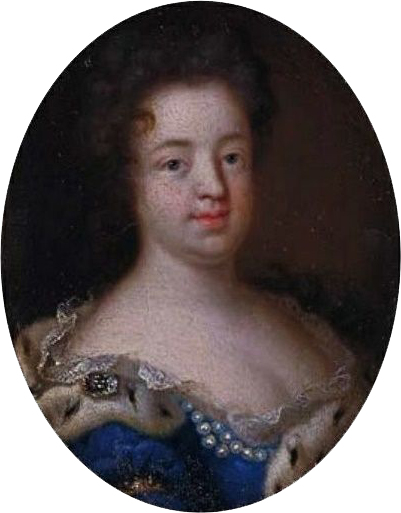
Ludvika Karalina in c. 1695

Radziwiłł was sued by King John III Sobieski for the alleged breach of the prenuptial agreement with his son, Jakub Ludwik Sobieski, with the intention to seize her estates. The case was lost, since it was proven that the agreement was falsified; its conclusion date was later than Radziwiłł's actual marriage date.

Radziwiłł first married Margrave Louis of Brandenburg (1666-1687), the youngest son of Frederick William the Great Elector and Princess Louise Henriette of Orange-Nassau, at Königsberg Castle on 7 January 1681 at the age of thirteen. She gave the lordships of Serrey and Tauroggen in Lithuania to the margrave shortly before his death in 1687. The properties passed to the Brandenburg electors of the House of Hohenzollern despite the protests of John Sobieski as king of Poland. Following her second marriage into the Sulzbach branch of the House of Wittelsbach, the Elector Palatine also claimed the two properties in right of his wife. The dispute was not resolved until a compromise was signed in 1741 between the Sulzbachs and the King of Prussia in 1741, by which the Hohenzollerns kept the lands in question but recognized the rights of Count Palatine Charles Theodore of Sulzbach to succeed to the throne of the Palatinate when its line of Wittelsbachs died out.

After Louis's untimely early death, Radziwiłł married Charles III Philip, Elector Palatine. Her heirs were born of this second marriage. Of their four children, only the youngest daughter, Countess Palatine Elizabeth Augusta Sophie of Neuburg survived childhood. Her descendants include Kings of Bavaria and a number of other royal and princely families, including Duchess Amalie in Bavaria, who married Duke Wilhelm Karl of Urach, who, after Lithuania was declared independent in 1918, would be invited by the Council of Lithuania to be King Mindaugas II of Lithuania, and was mother of the latter's children and descendants.

== Marriages and issue ==
On 7 January 1681, Ludwika Karolina Radziwiłł married Margrave Louis of Brandenburg. He died suddenly the morning of 7 April 1687 amid rumors of poison. This marriage was childless.

Radziwiłł remarried in Berlin on 10 August 1688 to the future Charles III Philip, Elector Palatine, brother-in-law of Leopold I, Holy Roman Emperor. The couple had four children, of whom only one survived childhood:

- Countess Palatine Leopoldine Eleonore Josephine of Neuburg (27 December 1689, Brieg – 8 March 1693).
- Countess Palatine Maria Anna of Neuburg (7 December 1690 – 1692).
- Countess Palatine Elisabeth Auguste Sofie of Neuburg (17 March 1693, Brieg – 30 January 1728, Mannheim); married on 1717 to her kinsman Joseph Charles, Hereditary Prince of Sulzbach.
- a son (born and died 22 March 1695, Brieg).

== Ancestry ==
Ancestors of Ludwika Karolina Radziwiłł

16. Mikołaj "the Red" Radziwiłł
8. Krzysztof Mikołaj "the Thunderbolt" Radziwiłł (= #24)
17. Katarzyna Tomicka-Iwińska
4. Janusz Radziwill (1579–1620)
18. Konstanty Wasyl Ostrogski
9. Princess Katarzyna Ostrogska
19. Countess Zofia Tarnowska
2. Prince Bogusław Radziwiłł
20. Joachim II Hector, Elector of Brandenburg
10. John George, Elector of Brandenburg
21. Magdalena of Saxony
5. Elisabeth Sophia of Brandenburg
22. Joachim Ernest, Prince of Anhalt
11. Elisabeth of Anhalt-Zerbst
23. Agnes of Barby-Mühlingen
1. Ludwika Karolina Radziwiłł
24. Krzysztof Mikołaj "the Thunderbolt" Radziwiłł (= #8)
12. Prince Krzysztof Radziwiłł II
25. Katarzyną Tęczyńską
6. Janusz Radziwill (1612–1655)
26. Jan Stanislaw Ciechanowiec-Kiszka
13. Anna Ciechanowiec-Kiszka
27. Elzbieta Sapieha
3. Princess Anna Maria Radziwiłł
28. Mikołaj Potocki
14. Stefan Potocki
29. Anna Czerminska
7. Katarzyna Potocka
30. Ieremia Movilă
15. Princess Maria Amalia Mohyła
31. Elzbieta Csomortany de Losoncz
