= Count Palatine Joseph Charles of Sulzbach =

Hereditary Prince of Sulzbach

Joseph Charles of Sulzbach
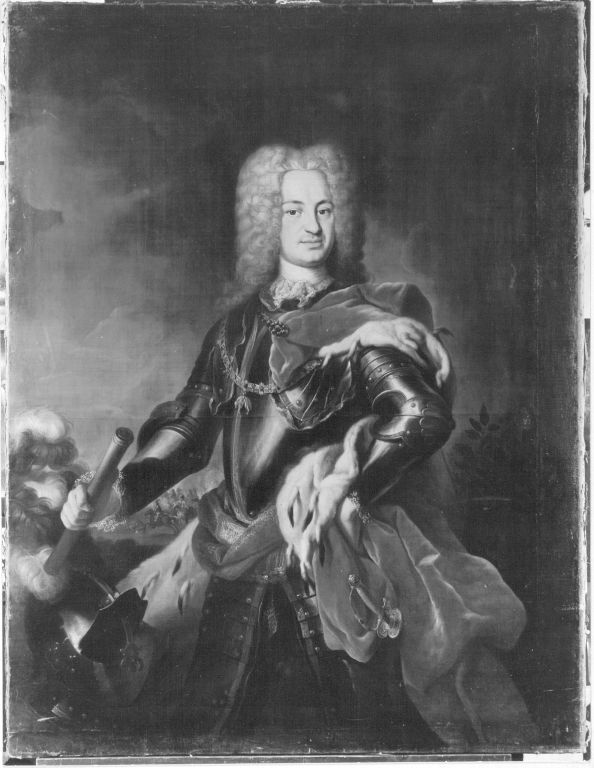
- Portrait by Jan Philips van der Schlichten
- Born: 2 November 1694; Sulzbach
- Died: 18 July 1729 (aged 34); Oggersheim
- Burial: St. Michael's Church, Munich
- Spouse: Elizabeth Augusta Sophie, Countess Palatine of Neuburg (m. 1717; died 1728)
- Issue: 7, including: Elisabeth Auguste, Electress of Bavaria; Maria Anna, Duchess of Bavaria; Maria Franziska, Countess Palatine of Zweibrücken-Birkenfeld
- House: Wittelsbach
- Father: Theodore Eustace, Count Palatine of Sulzbach
- Mother: Landgravine Eleonore Maria Amalie of Hesse-Rotenburg

Joseph Charles, Hereditary Prince of Sulzbach (German: Joseph Karl; Sulzbach, 2 November 1694 – Oggersheim, 18 July 1729) was the eldest son of Theodore Eustace, Count Palatine of Sulzbach.

== Life ==
The Sulzbach line was related to the Palatinate-Neuburg line who were Electors Palatine. The Elector of the Palatinate Charles III Philip failed to produce a legitimate male heir, as did his brothers. Joseph Charles, the eldest son of the Count Palatine of Sulzbach, was the heir apparent. On 2 May 1717 Joseph Charles married Countess Palatine Elizabeth Augusta Sophie of Neuburg (1693–1728), the daughter of Charles III Philip, a match intended to unite the two lines and prevented another succession war.

However, all the sons fathered by the couple died in infancy and only three daughters survived. In 1728 Elizabeth Augusta died in childbirth and Joseph Charles died the following year in Schloss Oggersheim. Therefore, the inheritance of Palatinate-Sulzbach and the eventual inheritance passed to Joseph Charles' brother John Christian Joseph and his family.

Nevertheless, their third daughter to survive infancy, Maria Francisca of Sulzbach, would be a progenitor of the Bavarian royal line as the mother of Maximilian I Joseph.

Joseph Charles was buried in the St. Michael's Church, Munich.

== Issue ==
- Karl Philipp August von der Pfalz (1718–1724)
- Innocenza Maria, Pfalzgräfin von der Pfalz (1719–1719)
- Elizabeth Augusta of Sulzbach (1721–1794), married Charles Theodore, Elector of Bavaria
- Maria Anna of Sulzbach (1722–1790), married Clement, Duke of Bavaria and Count Palatine
- Maria Francisca of Sulzbach (1724–1794), married Frederick Michael, second son of Christian III, Duke of Zweibrücken; their issue included the first King of Bavaria, Maximilian I Joseph
- Karl Philipp August, Pfalzgraf von der Pfalz (1725–1728)
- A son, Pfalzgraf von der Pfalz (1728–1728)
