= Charles III Philip =

Elector Palatine from 1716 to 1742

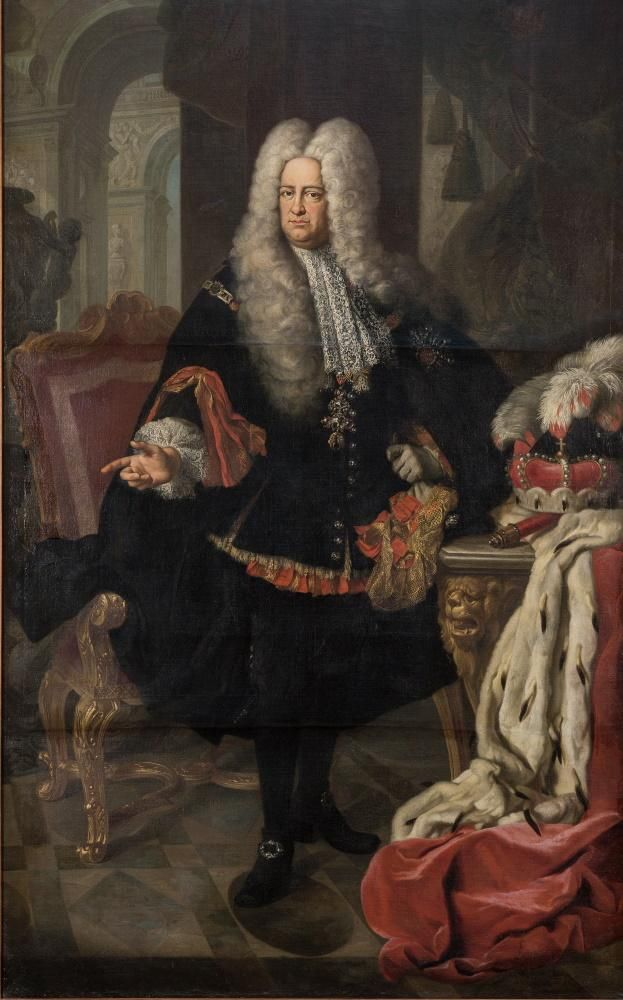

Elector Palatine Count Palatine of Neuburg
- Reign: 8 June 1716 – 31 December 1742
- Predecessor: John William
- Successor: Charles IV Theodore
- Born: 4 November 1661; Neuburg an der Donau, County of Palatinate-Neuburg, Holy Roman Empire
- Died: 31 December 1742 (aged 81); Mannheim, Electoral Palatinate, Holy Roman Empire
- Spouse: Ludwika Karolina Radziwiłł (m. 1688; died 1695) Teresa Lubomirska (m. 1701; died 1712) Violente Theresia of Thurn and Taxis (m. 1728)
- Issue more...: Elisabeth Auguste, Hereditary Princess of Sulzbach
- House: House of Wittelsbach
- Father: Philip William, Elector Palatine
- Mother: Elisabeth Amalie of Hesse-Darmstadt

Charles III Philip (4 November 1661 – 31 December 1742) was Elector Palatine, Count of Palatinate-Neuburg, and Duke of Jülich and Berg from 1716 to 1742. Until 1728 he was also Count of Megen.

== Early life ==
Born in Neuburg an der Donau, Charles Philip was the seventh of seventeen children of Philip William, Elector Palatine and Elisabeth Amalie of Hesse-Darmstadt.

Though Charles Philip became a cleric in Cologne at the age of fourteen in 1677 in Salzburg, and again in 1679 in Mainz, he was not ordained but instead started a military career in 1684. He then joined the Habsburg war against the Turks 1691–1694 and was promoted to imperial field marshal. In 1712 he was appointed Governor of Further Austria in Innsbruck.

== Career ==
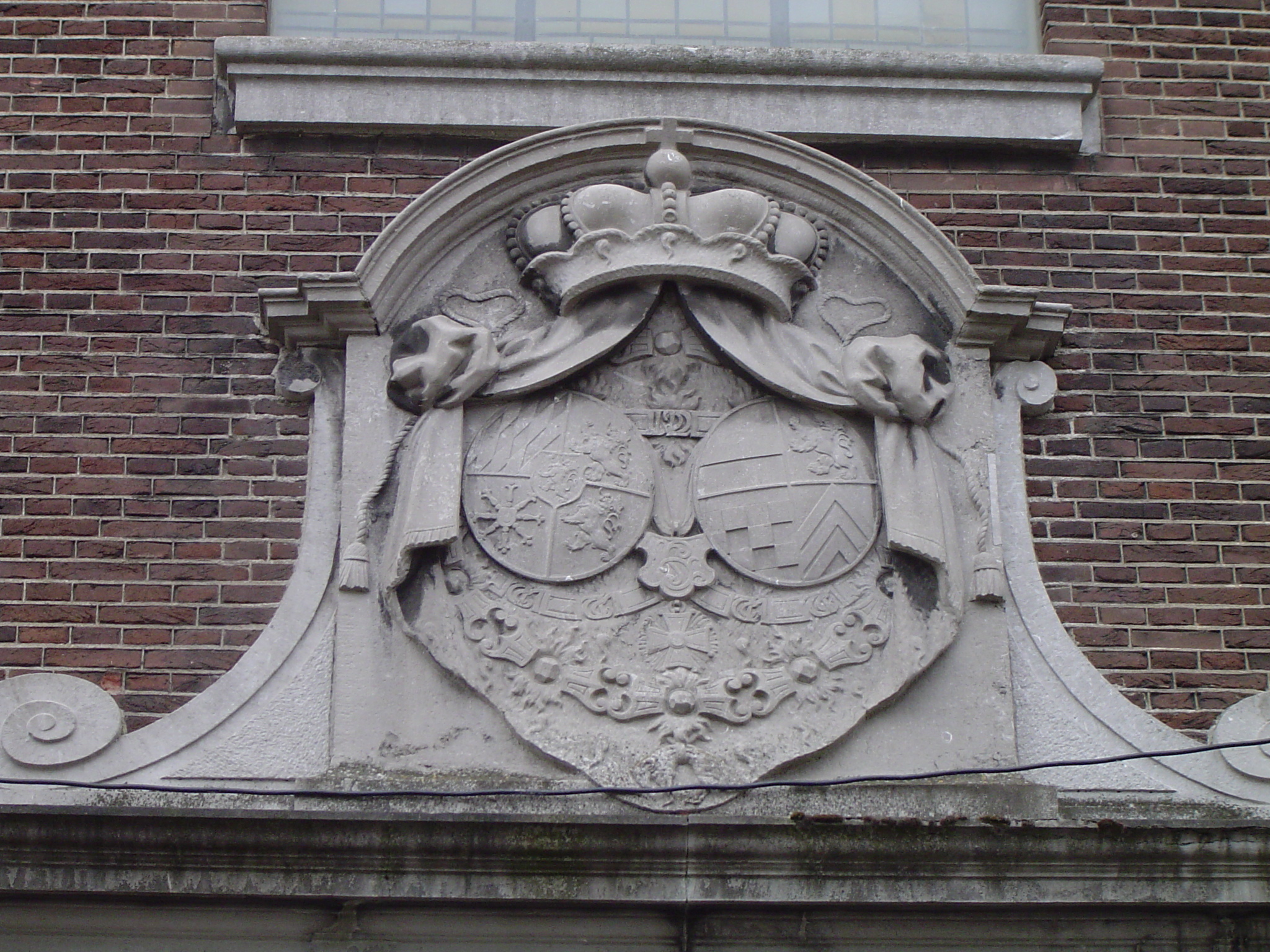
Coat of arms of Charles III Philip above the entrance of the St. Lucia church in Ravenstein, Netherlands, built in 1735

Charles Philip succeeded his brother Johann Wilhelm, Elector Palatine on his death in 1716. He moved the Palatinate's capital from Heidelberg to the new city of Mannheim in 1720, but not before promoting his favorite court jester, Perkeo of Heidelberg, to be in charge of the castle's wine stocks. To strengthen the union of all lines of the Wittelsbach dynasty Charles Philip organized a wedding on 17 January 1742 when his granddaughter Elizabeth Auguste was married to Charles Theodore of Palatinate-Sulzbach and her sister Maria Anna to the Bavarian prince Clement. In the imperial election a few days later Charles III Philip voted for his Bavarian cousin Prince-Elector Charles Albert.

=== Succession ===
Upon his death in December 1742, the Palatinate-Neuburg line became extinct, and the Electorate of the Palatinate (including Neuburg, Jülich and Berg) was inherited by Charles Theodore of the Palatinate-Sulzbach line of the Wittelsbach family. Another granddaughter of Charles Philip, Countess Palatine Maria Franziska of Sulzbach, was later married to Count Palatine Frederick Michael of Zweibrücken. Their son Maximilian I Joseph of Palatinate-Zweibrücken became the heir of the Palatinate-Sulzbach line.

While in Mannheim, Charles III Philip, and later his successor Charles IV Theodore, put together what was commonly regarded as the finest orchestra in all of Europe. Under the leadership of musicians such as Johann Stamitz and Carlo Grua, the orchestra of the Kapelle was lauded by such musicians such as Leopold and Wolfgang Amadeus Mozart.

== Personal life ==
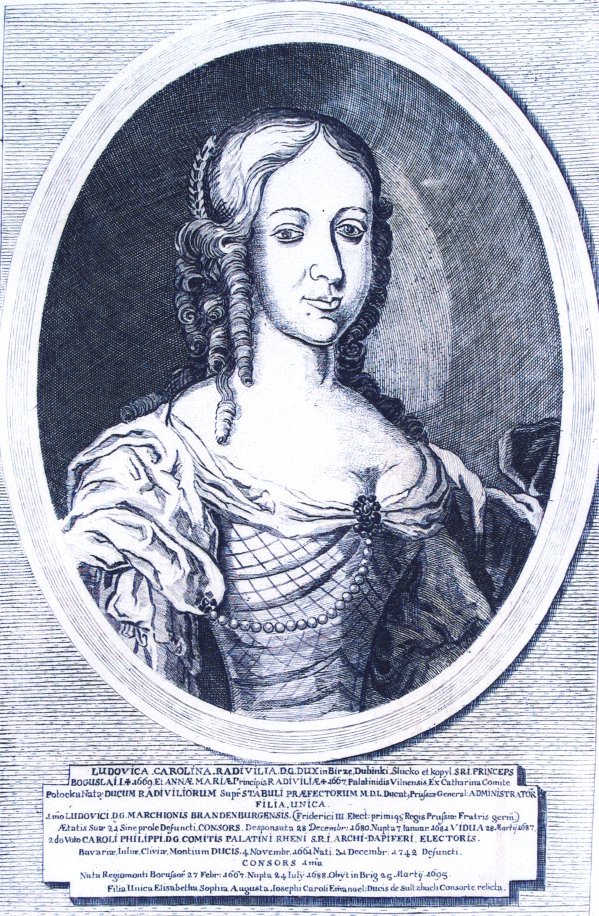
Princess Ludwika Carolina Radziwill

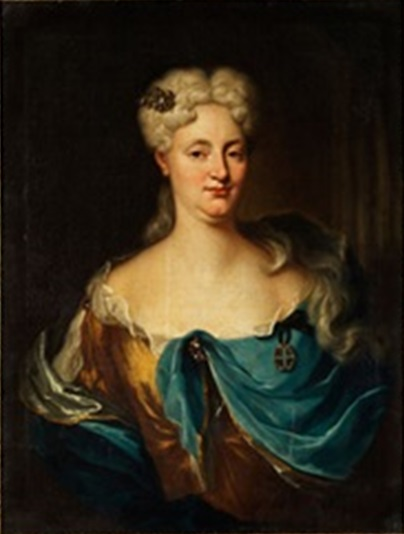
Violante Theresia of Thurn and Taxis

Charles Philip was married three times. His first marriage took place in Berlin on 10 August 1688 when he married Princess Ludwika Karolina Radziwiłł, dowager margravine of Brandenburg and a wealthy heiress in Lithuania. They had four children although only a single daughter, Elisabeth Auguste, lived to adulthood:

1. Leopoldine Eleonore Josephine (1689–1693), who died young.
2. Maria Anna (1690–1692), who died young.
3. Elisabeth Auguste Sophie (1693–1728), who married her kinsman, the Count Palatine Joseph Karl of Sulzbach, in 1717.
4. Stillborn son (1695–1695), who died in childbirth at Brieg.

After the death of his first wife, Ludwika, a few days after the birth of their fourth child due to complications from the birth, he married secondly on 15 December 1701 in Kraków, Princess Teresa Lubomirska, heiress of Ostróg. They had two daughters, neither of whom though lived past the age of three:

1. Theophila Elisabeth Franziska Felicitas (1703–1705).
2. Anna Elisabeth Theophila (1709–1712), who was born and died at Innsbruck.

In 1728, he married Countess Violente Maria Theresia of Thurn und Taxis (1683–1734), the daughter of Count Philipp Wilhelm Konstantin von Thurn und Taxis (1647-1703) and his wife, Countess Maria Adelheid von Aham (1652-1714). This childless union was considered morganatic, as his wife belonged to the comital cadet Augsburg branch of the wealthy House of Thurn und Taxis, a line that lacked imperial immediacy and had only been elevated to baronial rank in 1657 and to the dignity of Imperial count in 1701. But, in 1733 Violente received the honorary title of Princess from Charles VI, Holy Roman Emperor.

Charles III died in Mannheim on 31 December 1742.

Charles III Philip House of Wittelsbach Born: 1661 Died: 1742
Regnal titles
Preceded by John William	Duke of Jülich and Berg; Count Palatine of Neuburg; Elector Palatine; 1716–1742	Succeeded by Charles IV Theodore
