= Heart of stone =

Heart of stone or Heart of Stone may refer to:

== Film and television ==
- Heart of Stone (1924 film), a German silent film
- Heart of Stone (1950 film), an East German film
- Heart of Stone, a 2001 American psychological thriller film
- Heart of Stone (2009 film), an American documentary
- Heart of Stone (2023 film), an American spy film
- "Heart of Stone" (Mysticons), a television episode
- "Heart of Stone" (Once Upon a Time in Wonderland), a television episode
- "Heart of Stone" (Star Trek: Deep Space Nine), a television episode

== Music ==
=== Albums ===
- Heart of Stone (Cher album), 1989
- Heart of Stone (Chris Knight album), 2008

=== Songs ===
- "Heart of Stone" (Bucks Fizz song), 1988; covered by Cher, 1990
- "Heart of Stone" (Jelly Roll song), 2024
- "Heart of Stone" (Rolling Stones song), 1964
- "Heart of Stone" (Suzi Quatro song), 1982
- "Heart of Stone" (Taylor Dayne song), 1990
- "(Wish I Had A) Heart of Stone", by Baillie & the Boys, 1989
- "Heart of Stone", by Andreas Kümmert, competing to represent Germany in the Eurovision Song Contest 2015
- "Heart of Stone", by Dave Stewart, 1994
- "Heart of Stone", by Erasure from The Innocents, 1988
- "Heart of Stone", by Europe from The Final Countdown, 1986
- "Heart of Stone", by Fleetwood Mac from 25 Years – The Chain, 1992
- "Heart of Stone", by Iko from The Twilight Saga: Breaking Dawn – Part 2 soundtrack, 2012
- "Heart of Stone", by Kenny, 1973
- "Heart of Stone", by Matt Costa from Unfamiliar Faces, 2008
- "Heart of Stone", by Motörhead from Iron Fist, 1982
- "Heart of Stone", by the Raveonettes from In and Out of Control, 2009
- "Heart of Stone", by Silver Convention from Save Me (1975)
- "Heart of Stone", by SVT, 1979
- "Heart of Stone", by Toby Marlow & Lucy Moss from the musical Six, 2018
- "Heart of Stone", by Underoath from Act of Depression, 1999
- "Heart of Stone", by Whitesnake from Flesh & Blood, 2019

== Other uses ==
- Heart of stone (medicine), calcification of the heart
- "Heart of Stone" (German fairy tale), an 1827 story by Wilhelm Hauff
- Heart of Stone (novel), a 1996 novel by Sebastiano Vassalli

== See also ==
- Hearts of Stone (disambiguation)
- Heartstone (disambiguation)
