= Gustav Adolf Closs =

German artist (1864–1938)

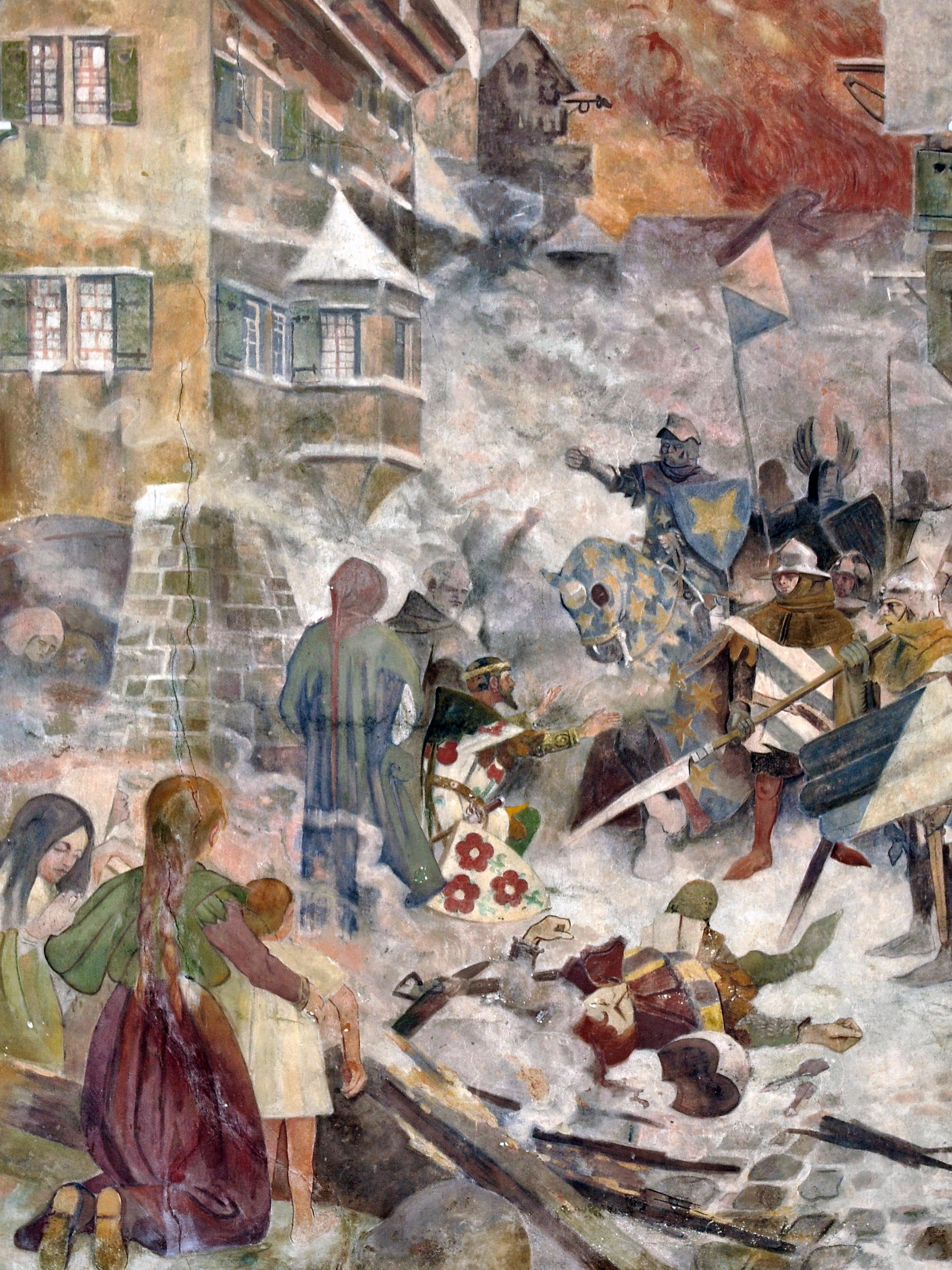
The Destruction of Rapperswil in 1350 (wall painting)

Gustav Adolf Carl Closs also as Closs, A., Closs, A.G., Closz (or Closz), Adolf Gustav (6 May 1864 – 3 September 1938) was a German painter, illustrator, heraldist and entomologist.

== Biography ==
He was born in Stuttgart. His father was the woodcut artist, Adolf Closs (1840–1894); his father's twin brother was the landscape painter, Gustav Paul Closs. He began his education in the public schools of Stuttgart, graduating in 1882. He then enrolled at the University of Tübingen, where he studied law. He also briefly attended the University of Freiburg. In 1886, he quit without having completed his course of study.

Having decided on a change of careers, he was admitted to the Academy of Fine Arts, Karlsruhe, where he studied with Ernst Schurth (1848–1910). After one year, he transferred to the Academy of Fine Arts, Munich, and became a student of Wilhelm von Diez. Being rather conservative, he apparently declined to join the Munich Secession. While there, he began providing illustrations for local periodicals. Among his first were a set of drawings for Der Feuerreiter by Eduard Mörike; published in Die Gartenlaube.

After leaving the academy in 1891, he returned to Stuttgart, but continued providing illustrations for the popular satirical journal Fliegende Blätter for twenty years. In 1898, he received a prize for his trading card designs from the Stollwerck chocolate company. In 1907, he married Martha Pauline Karoline Pfaff, the daughter of a musical instrument maker, thirteen years his junior. The marriage produced no children.

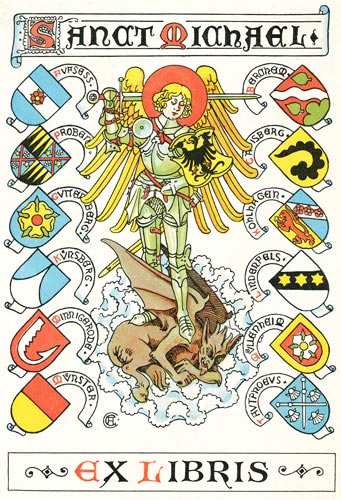
Heraldic book plate for the Verein Sanct Michael

Among his book illustrations are those for Lichtenstein by Wilhelm Hauff, Die Sklavenkaravane by Karl May and Schillers Heimatjahre by Hermann Kurz.

Despite the fact that illustrative work provided the bulk of his income, he considered himself to be primarily a painter. Among his major works were wall paintings at Schöckingen Castle in Ditzingen and Rapperswil Castle, which were commissions provided through his friendship with Friedrich von Gaisberg-Schöckingen (1857–1932). He also did work at Hellenstein Castle. Several similar works were destroyed during World War II. One of his most famous works was a scene from the life of Roland, created at the request of Kaiser Wilhelm II. He also produced some paintings for King Carol I of Romania and designed stained-glass windows, made by Franz Xaver Zettler for the Kösener Senioren-Convents-Verband.

His friend, Gaisberg-Schöckingen, introduced him to the art of heraldry. From 1918 to 1934, he was a member of the "Verein für Heraldik, Genealogie und verwandte Wissenschaften zu Berlin", serving as Deputy-Chairman. He also edited the coats-of-arms for the Genealogisches Handbuch bürgerlicher Familien.

After the Nazi takeover, he was employed as a heraldic expert by the Deutscher Gemeindetag. Closs was a keen amateur entomologist specialising in Sphingidae. He wrote

- Closs, G. A., Zwei neue Aberrationen aus meiner Sphingidensammlung, en Internationale Zeitschrift Entomologische, vol. 6, Guben, Internationaler Verein Entomologischer i.v. 31 Août, 1912, pp. 384 (153). 20 Août Récupéré, 2014.
- Closs, G.A. (1910). Zwei neue Sphingidenformen Berliner entomologische Zeitschrift 54: 224.
- Closs, G.A. (1911). Zwei neue Sphingidenformen in meiner Sammlung Internationale entomologische Zeitschrift 5: 199.
- Closs, G.A. (1917). Neue Formen aus der Familie der Sphingidae Internationale entomologische Zeitschrift 11: 153

Two notable hawk moths described by Closs are Xylophanes indistincta and Adhemarius fulvescens. His Sphingidae collection is held by the Bavarian State Collection of Zoology see list of ZSM types.

Closs died in 1938 in Berlin.

== Sources ==
- (in German) Gustav Adolf Closs. In: Allgemeines Künstlerlexikon. Die Bildenden Künstler aller Zeiten und Völker (AKL). Band 19, Saur, München u. a. 1998, ISBN 3-598-22759-0, S. 588
- (in German) Gustav Adolf Closs. In: Ulrich Thieme, Felix Becker (editors): Allgemeines Lexikon der Bildenden Künstler von der Antike bis zur Gegenwart. Band 7, E. A. Seemann, Leipzig 1912, S. 114.
- Gustav Adolf Closs. In: Hans Vollmer: Allgemeines Lexikon der bildenden Künstler des XX. Jahrhunderts. Vol.5 E. A. Seemann, Leipzig 1961, pg.387
- [Horn, W.] 1938: [Closs, A. G.] Arbeiten über morphologische und taxonomische Entomologie aus Berlin-Dahlem, Berlin 5 (4), p. 352
- Gaedeck R, Groll EK (editors) (2010). Biografien der Entomologen der Welt: Datenbank. Version 4.15. Senckenberg Deutsches Entomologisches Institut. (in German).
