= Karl Alexander =

Karl Alexander may refer to:

- Karl Alexander, Duke of Württemberg (1684–1737), who served as Duke from 1698 until 1737
- Karl Alexander, 5th Prince of Thurn and Taxis (1770–1827), the 5th Prince of Thurn and Taxis
- Karl Alexander, Grand Duke of Saxe-Weimar-Eisenach (1818–1901), who served as Grand Duke from 1853 to 1901
- Karl-Alexander Island, also known as Zemlya Karla-Alexandra
- Karl Alexander (writer) (1938–2015), American writer and author of Time After Time

See also:

- Christian Frederick Charles Alexander, Margrave of Brandenburg-Ansbach (1736–1806), commonly known as Karl Alexander
- Karl Alexander Müller (1927–2023), Swiss physicist and Nobel laureate
- Carl Alexander Heideloff (1789–1865), German architect
