= Heart of Stone (1924 film) =

1924 film

- Directed by: Fred Sauer
- Written by: Wilhelm Hauff (fairy tale); Fred Sauer; Walter Wassermann
- Starring: Fritz Schulz; Grete Reinwald; Frida Richard
- Cinematography: Heinrich Gärtner
- Production company: Hermes-Film
- Release date: 22 August 1924
- Country: Germany
- Languages: Silent; German intertitles

Heart of Stone (German: Das kalte Herz) is a 1924 German silent film directed by Fred Sauer and starring Fritz Schulz, Grete Reinwald and Frida Richard. The film is based on a fairy tale by Wilhelm Hauff.

The film's sets were designed by the art director Siegfried Wroblewsky.

== Cast ==
- Fritz Schulz as Peter Munk
- Grete Reinwald as Lisbeth
- Frida Richard
- Heinrich Peer
- Philipp Manning
- Paul Walker
- Victor Costa
- Gustav Trautschold
- Edith Penner
- Harry Berber

== See also ==
- Heart of Stone (1950)

== Bibliography ==
- Bock, Hans-Michael & Bergfelder, Tim. The Concise CineGraph. Encyclopedia of German Cinema. Berghahn Books, 2009.
