= Georg, Truchsess von Waldburg =

German nobleman and soldier (1488–1531)

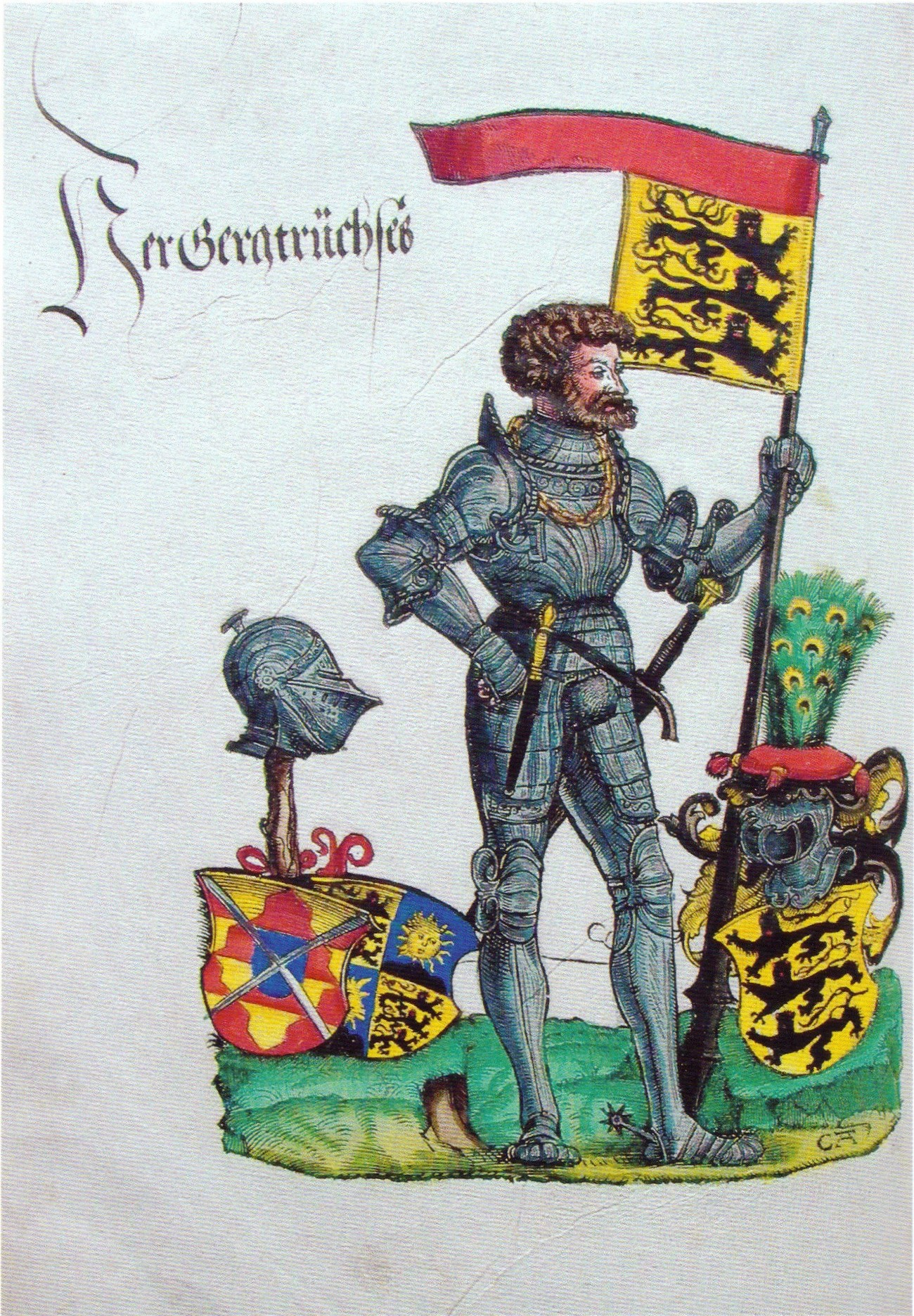
Bauernjörg, Georg, Truchsess von Waldburg, by Hans Burgkmair

Georg III Truchsess von Waldburg-Zeil (Waldsee, 25 January 1488 – Bad Waldsee, 29 May 1531), also known as Bauernjörg, was a Swabian League Army Commander in the German Peasants' War.

== Life ==
He was a member of the House of Waldburg, which received through him in 1525 the hereditary title of Truchsess (Seneschal, or Steward, in English) of the Holy Roman Empire and the right to put it in their family name.

He served since 1508 Duke Ulrich von Württemberg and helped him crush the Poor Conrad rebellion. In 1516 he fought for Bavaria alongside Maximilian I, Holy Roman Emperor in Italy against France and their allies.

In the next years he was in the service of the Swabian League and chased his former employer, Ulrich von Württemberg out of Württemberg. In 1525 he succeeded his cousin Wilhelm as governor of Württemberg. Both received the hereditary title of Imperial Steward (Reichserbtruchsess) from the hands of Emperor Charles V on 27 July 1526 in Toledo.

== Bauernjörg ==
Georg became famous as Bauernjörg for his harsh and pitiless actions against the rebellious peasants in the German Peasants' War.

When the German peasants revolted in 1525, most Imperial troops were fighting in Italy. Georg von Waldburg could only recruit 4,000 unreliable Landsknechts and could do nothing more than to negotiate with the peasants. But after the victory against France in the Battle of Pavia, a number of war veterans returned to Southern Germany and were enlisted by Waldburg.

Under his command, army after army of peasants was defeated and pursued into their villages to be tortured and executed. Sources speak of between 70,000 and 130,000 peasants killed. After the rebellion was crushed, Georg Truchsess von Waldburg-Zeil ruled large parts of the territories he had conquered, and collected ransoms from the remaining population.

== In literature ==
The Truchsess von Waldburg-Zeil is a character in the historical novel Lichtenstein by Wilhelm Hauff. He is also a character in the historical novel The Adventurer, AKA Michael The Finn (Mikael Karvajalka) by Mika Waltari.
