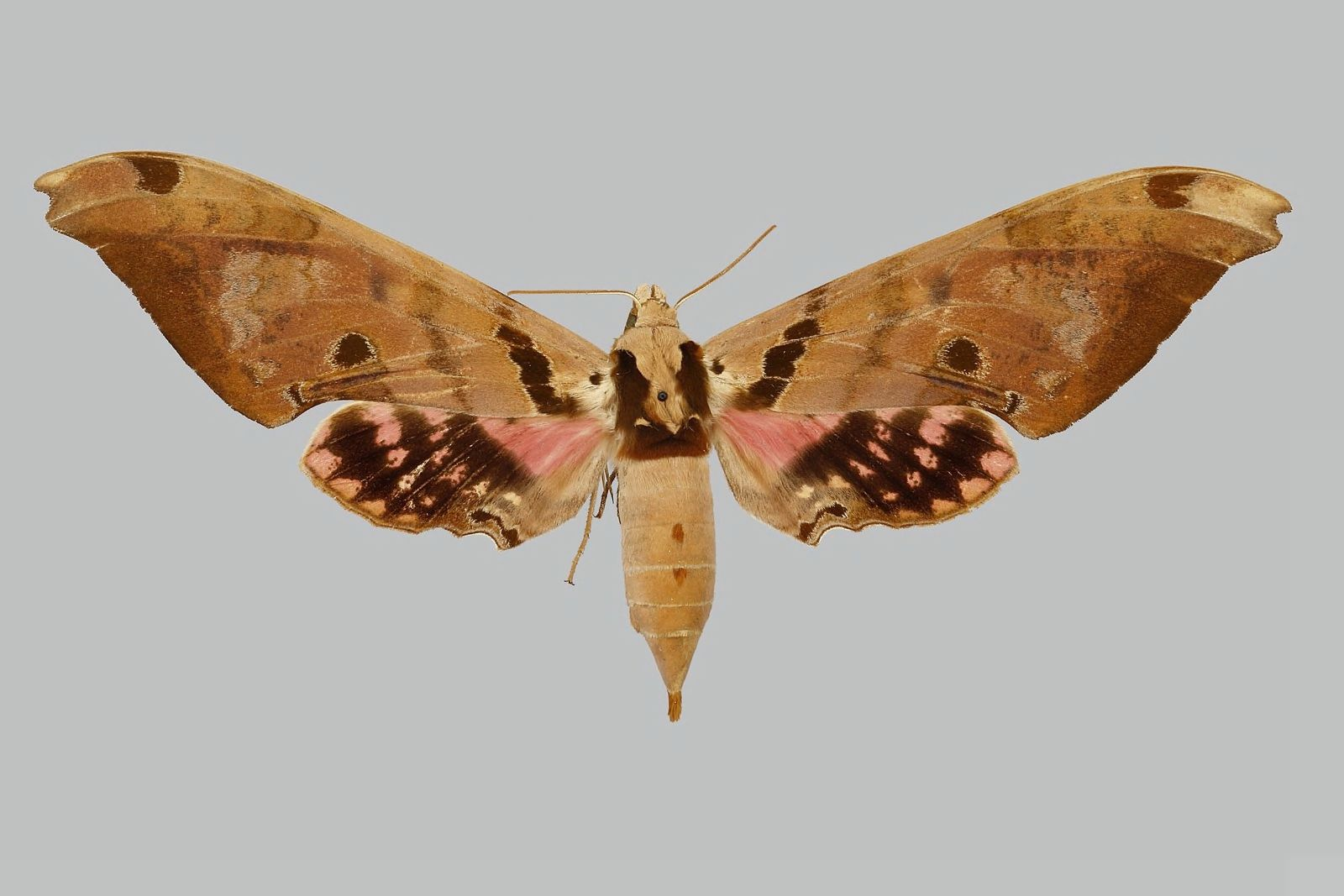
- Female, upperside
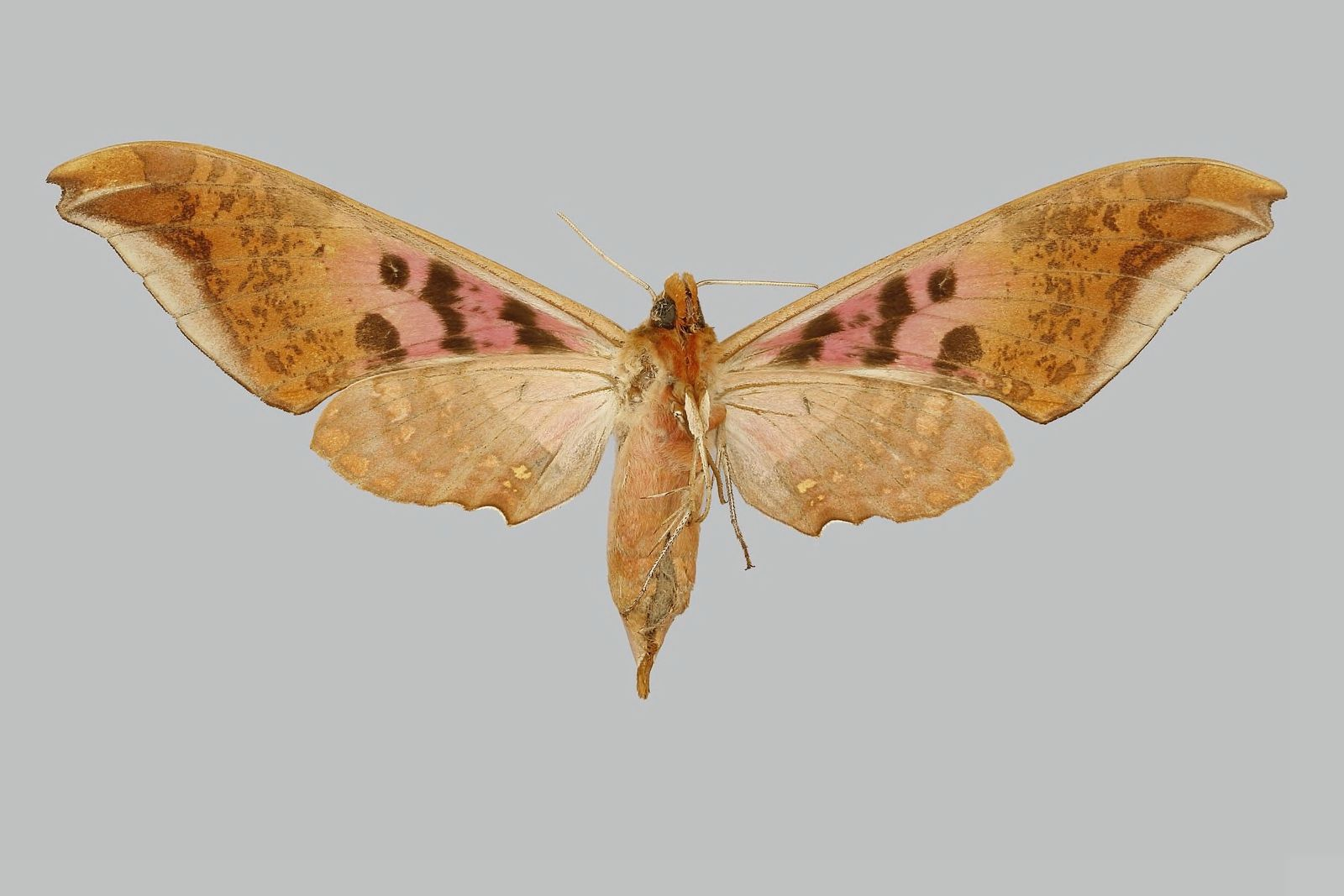
- Female, underside

Scientific classification
- Domain: Eukaryota
- Kingdom: Animalia
- Phylum: Arthropoda
- Class: Insecta
- Order: Lepidoptera
- Family: Sphingidae
- Genus: Adhemarius
- Species: A. fulvescens

Binomial name
- Adhemarius fulvescens (Closs, 1915)

Synonyms
- Amplypterus fulvescens Closs, 1915

= Adhemarius fulvescens =

Species of moth

Adhemarius fulvescens is a species of moth in the family Sphingidae. It was described by Gustav Adolf Closs in 1915, and is known from Mexico, Guatemala, Costa Rica and north-central Nicaragua.

Adults are on wing in May, from July to August and again from October to November in Nicaragua.
