= Master of Schloss Lichtenstein =

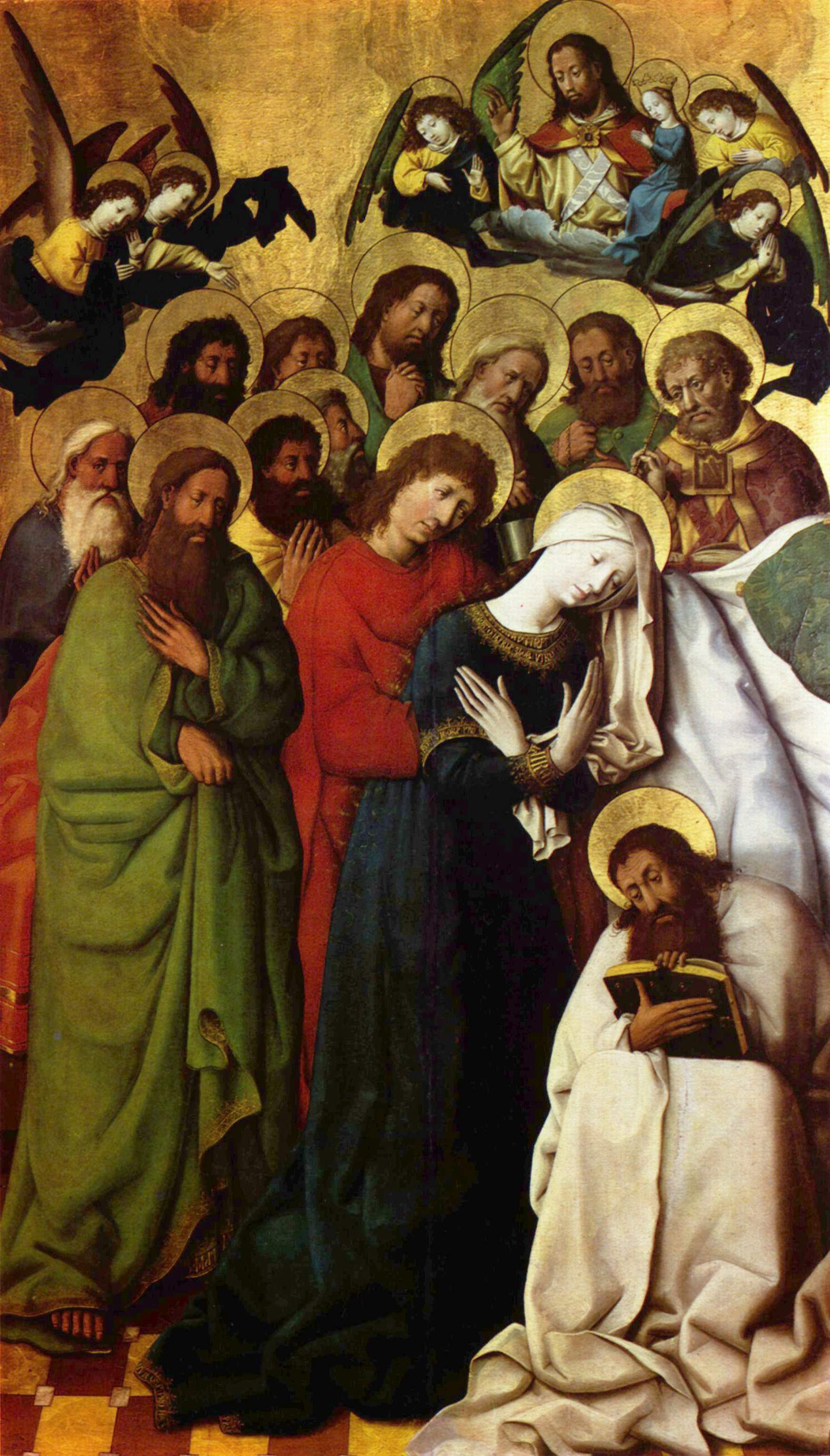
One of two altar wings by the Master of Schloss Lichtenstein located in Lichtenstein Castle.

The Master of Schloss Lichtenstein (fl. c. 1430 – 1450) was an Austrian late Gothic painter.

== Works ==
Nothing is known about the person who is today referred to as the Master of Schloss Lichtenstein. The name derives from Lichtenstein Castle in south-western Germany, where two wings of an altarpiece by his hand are located. Twenty-one other panels attributed to his hand and possibly originally even part of the same altarpiece, have been identified. They are today distributed among museums all over the world.

The artist is characterised for working in a transitional style of Gothic, similar to that of his countrymen the Master of the Albrecht Altar and the Viennese Master of the Presentation of Christ (fl. 1420–1440). Influences from Italian Gothic art (from the 14th century) and contemporary art from the Low Countries. The Master of Schloss Lichtenstein has been described as one of the most innovative artists of his age.
