= Hearthstone (disambiguation) =

Hearthstone is a 2014 online collectible card game.

Hearthstone may also refer to:

== Artifacts ==
- A stone in a hearth (or fireplace)

== Places ==
- Hearthstone, Derbyshire, a location in England
- Hearthstone Castle, Connecticut, U.S.
- Hearthstone Historic House Museum, Appleton, Wisconsin, U.S.
- Hicklin Hearthstone, Lexington, Missouri, U.S.

== See also ==
- Heartstone (disambiguation)
- Stonehearth
