= Lichtenstein Castle (Württemberg) =

Tourist attraction in southern Germany

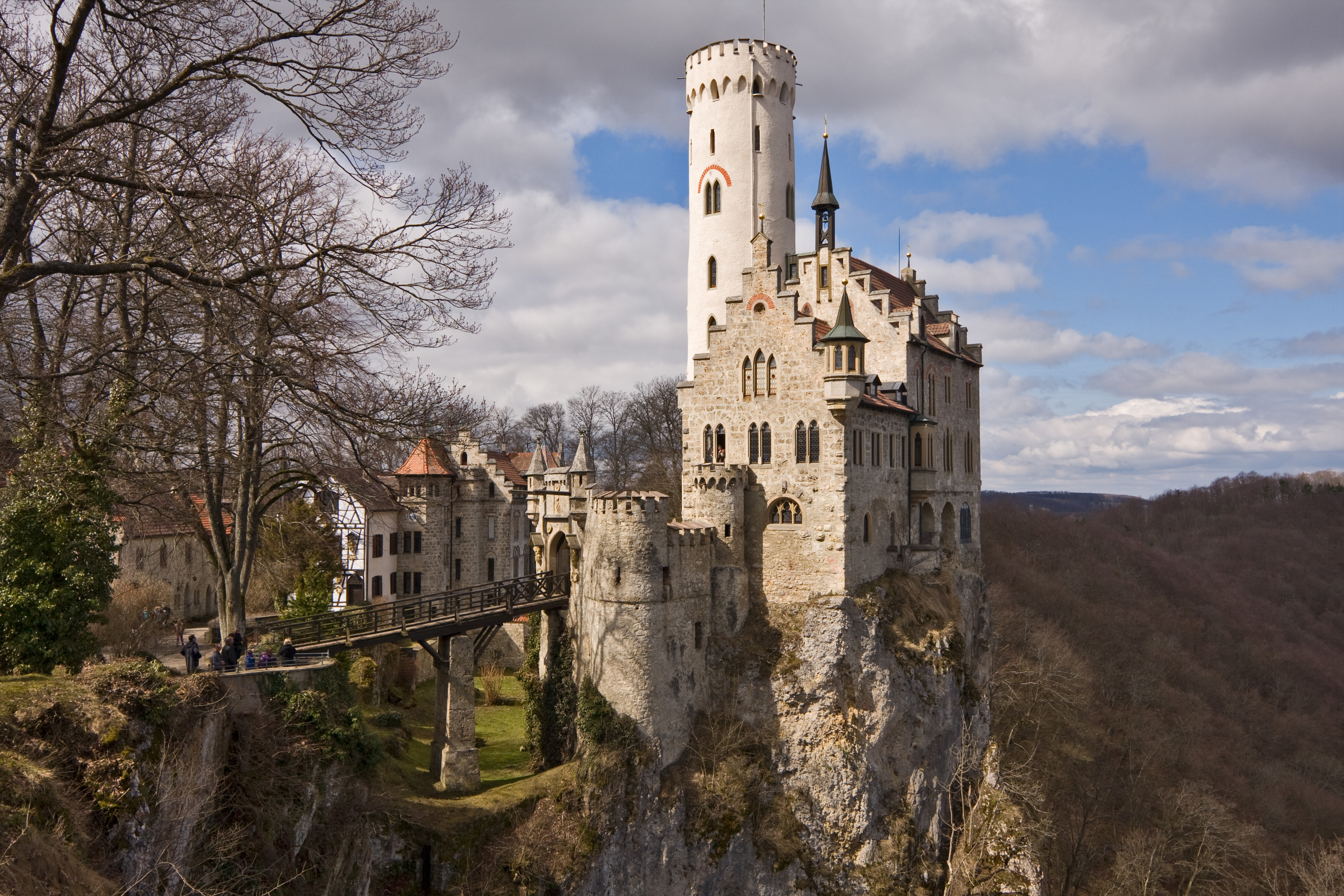
Map location and basic information
Interactive map of the Lichtenstein Castle area
General information
Location	Honau, Germany
Coordinates	48°24′24″N 9°15′29″E
Elevation	817 metres (2,680 ft) (NN)
Current tenants	Duke Wilhelm Albert von Urach
- Owner: Dukes of Urach

Website
- www.schloss-lichtenstein.de/en/

Lichtenstein Castle (Schloss Lichtenstein) is a privately owned Gothic Revival castle located in the Swabian Jura of southern Germany. It was designed by Carl Alexander Heideloff and its name means "shining stone" or "bright stone". The castle overlooks the Echaz valley near Honau, Reutlingen, in the state of Baden-Württemberg. The modern castle was inspired by Wilhelm Hauff's 1826 novel Lichtenstein and was built in 1840–1842. The ruins of an older medieval castle are a few hundred meters away.

== Geography ==
The castle is located on an escarpment that marks the northwestern edge of the Swabian Jura. It is in the Reutlingen district and has an altitude of 817 metres (2,680 feet). and about 250 metres (820 feet) above the Echaz river, a small tributary of the Neckar river. The ruins of Lichtenstein Castle's medieval predecessor, the Burg Alt-Lichtenstein, lies 500 metres (1,600 feet) away.

== History ==
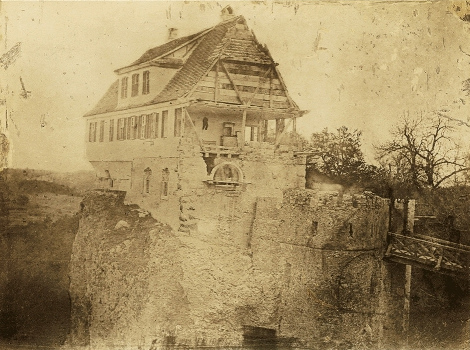
Demolition of the old lodge, 1839

Beginning around 1100, a castle belonging to a family of ministerials of the counts of Achalm and later counts of Württemberg, was located on the escarpment above the source of the river Echaz. The castle and its denizens, the lords of Lichtenstein, were not friendly with the Free Imperial City of Reutlingen and were thus under frequent attack. The old castle was destroyed twice, once during the imperial civil war of 1311 and again by the citizens of Reutlingen sometime between 1377 and 1381. A new castle was built in 1390 some 500 metres (1,600 ft) from the ruins of the old one. The site selected was the same as that of the current structure. It was one of the most impressive fortifications of the Late Middle Ages. Despite such features as early casemates that made it nearly unassailable, the castle ceased to be the ducal seat in 1567 and fell into disrepair. During the Thirty Years' War (1618–48), it was taken over by the Tyrolean line of the Habsburgs following the death of the last member of the Lichtenstein family in 1687 during the Great Turkish War. The coat of arms of their family, a pair of golden angel wings on a blue background, is still displayed in the great hall of the castle.

In 1802, King Frederick I of Württemberg came into possession of the castle, dismantled it to its foundations and replaced it with a hunting lodge.

=== Modern castle ===
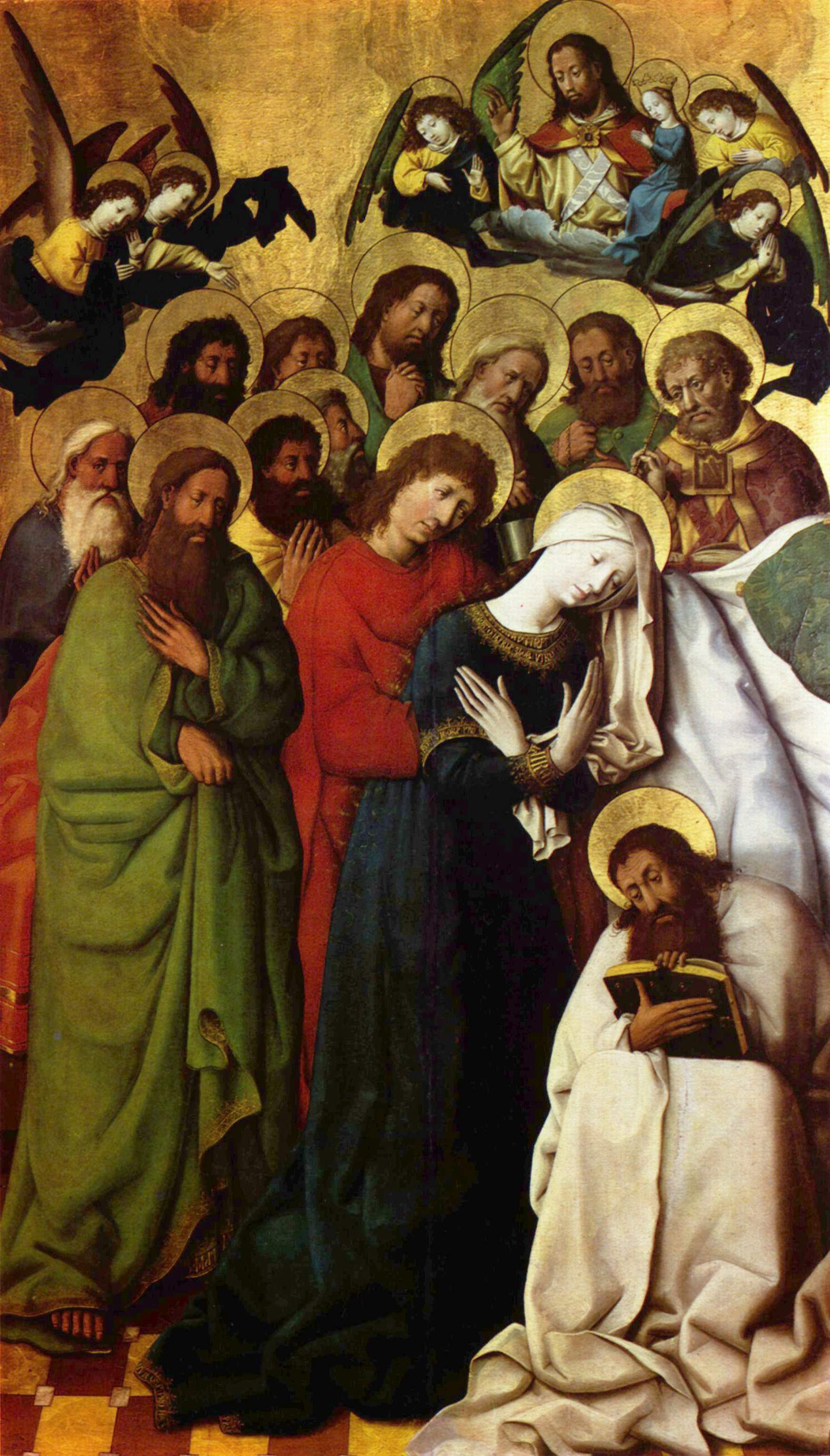
One of two altar wings by the Master of Lichtenstein located in the castle

As a consequence of 19th-century Romanticism, medieval virtues like chivalry became increasingly popular among the elites. Parallel to this, medieval architecture, primarily Gothic style, returned to public attention in Germany with the unfinished Cologne Cathedral, (Note: As was typical with the construction of cathedrals, Cologne Cathedral took a very long time to build. In the instance of Cologne Cathedral, construction began in 1248, but was not completed until 1880 as work was interrupted for centuries.) leading to the rise of Gothic Revival architecture. Other notable examples of this romantic infatuation with medieval structures and architecture are the Votive Church of Vienna and Neuschwanstein Castle in Bavaria. This nostalgic longing for the medieval past, spurred on by the works of authors such as Horace Walpole, Sir Walter Scott, and John Ruskin, meant that architecture had once again turned from the Classical to the Gothic style of architecture.

In 1826, German poet and patriot Wilhelm Hauff published his book Lichtenstein, in which the castle, the book's namesake, played a major role. Hauff's novel was inspired by the historical romances of Walter Scott, some of which Hauff reviewed and wrote a parody about. King Frederick's cousin, Count (later Duke) Wilhelm von Urach, a German patriot, who was very interested in medieval history, art, and architecture, was so inspired by the book that he purchased the estate – at that time merely another crumbling ruin in the Swabian Jura – from the king in 1837, after negotiations for the purchase with the resident groundskeeper Philipp Freiherr von Hügel and his successor.

Desiring an accurate emulation of a medieval castle to live in and house his substantial collection of medieval arts, arms, and armor, Wilhelm recruited architect and restorationist Carl Alexander Heideloff after turning down designs by Württemberg court painter Franz Seraph Stirnbrand and Christian Wilhelm von Faber du Faur – designs that differed substantially from today's structure. Construction of the New Lichtenstein Castle began in 1840 and was managed by Johann Georg Rupp. This structure, its design heavily influenced by Count Wilhelm, used the ancient foundations of the castle of 1390, and stood up to three stories tall, with a curtain wall and courtyard to complete the castle complex. A barbican and a sprawling outer bailey, complete with corner bastions and turrets, was constructed in 1857.

Following this, the castle was then decorated within and without by Nuremberg painter and architect Georg Eberlein. The most important works in the castle are "Death of the Virgin Mary" by Michael Wolgemut and two altar panels by an unknown Austrian artist called the "Master of Lichtenstein."

The castle was completed in 1842, and the king was present for its inauguration ceremony. In 1869, it became the official residence of the dukes of Urach.

After the Revolution of 1848, then-Count Wilhelm became the first duke of Urach. A passionate artillery officer, he desired to improve the defenses of his castle and so began to build pre-outwork caponiers in the style of the imperial Fortress of Ulm (though not on a scale as grand) and a trench along the fortress to deter attack. Later he had cannons placed in the bastions on the walls. From 1898 to 1901 the two buildings left of the main gate, the Ducal Palace and the old groundskeepers house, were constructed and expanded respectively. A motion to build a cableway up to the castle in 1911 was rejected because it was believed it would ruin the beauty of the castle.

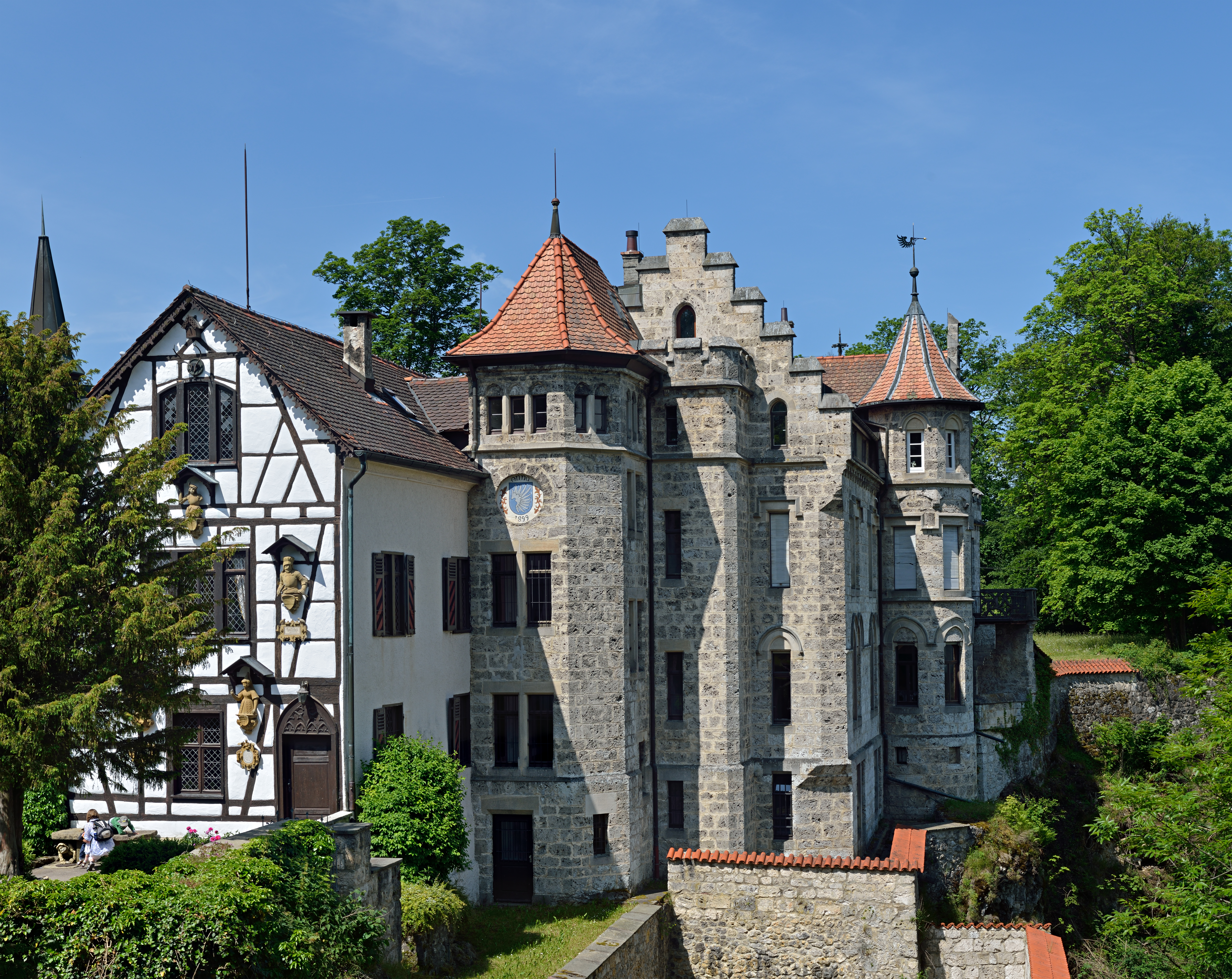
Outer bailey structure

=== Restoration ===
The castle was damaged during World War II, but efforts to restore it began in the immediate aftermath of the war. Once again, and thanks to local non-profit organizations like the Wüstenrot Foundation and Community Fund for the Preservation of Lichtenstein Castle, the walls were restored in 1980, followed by the second floor in 1998. The upper floor and roof were restored in 2002.

== Recreations ==
In 1862, a castle was constructed in Lietzow, at Bergen auf Rügen, Mecklenburg-Vorpommern, that copied much from Lichtenstein Castle.

The Former Vanderburgh County Sheriff's Residence in Evansville, Indiana, is modeled after Lichtenstein Castle.

The "Leckzapfen" vineyard house constructed at Osthofen in 1891 in Worms in Rhenish Hesse is almost a miniature version of the main building of Lichtenstein Castle.

Reynier Fritz, a German-born Cape Town business man saw the castle and decided to replicate it in upon his return to Hout Bay, South Africa. He started building Lichtenstein Castle in 1986 and in 1998 it was completed, He eventually turned it into a guest house before dying there. Some time after his death, his widow sold it to an overseas buyer. Allegedly haunted, the castle is one of the area's most popular attractions. In 2012, the castle was sold for 23 million Rand to a Russian businessman.

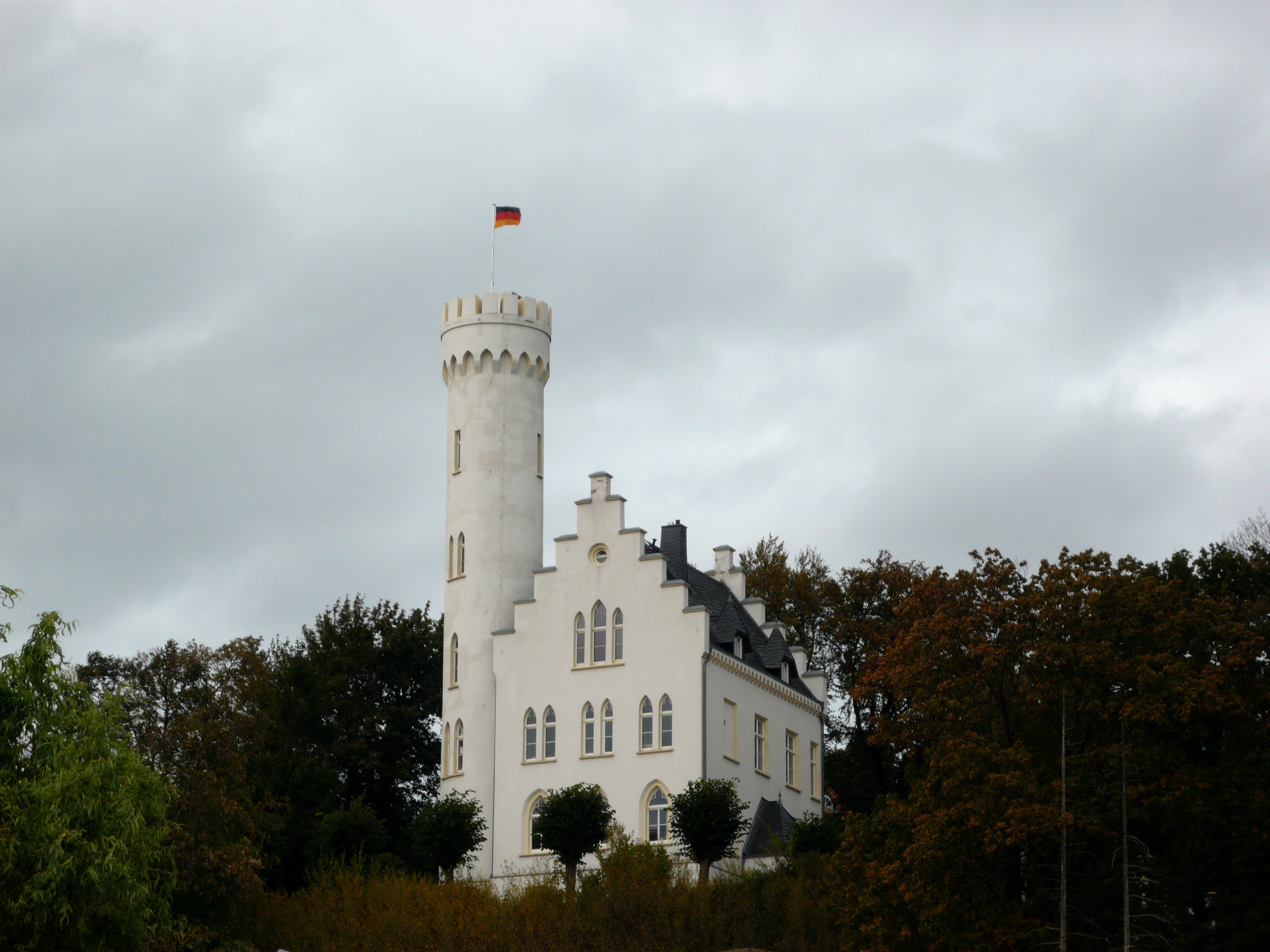
Lietzow

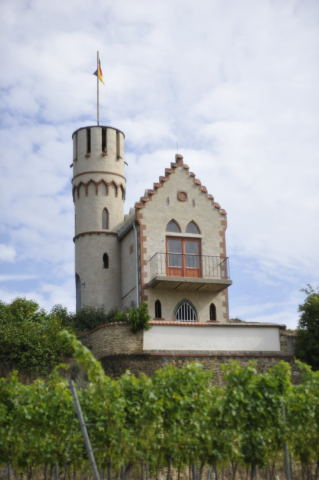
Osthofen

Arms of the dukes of Urach

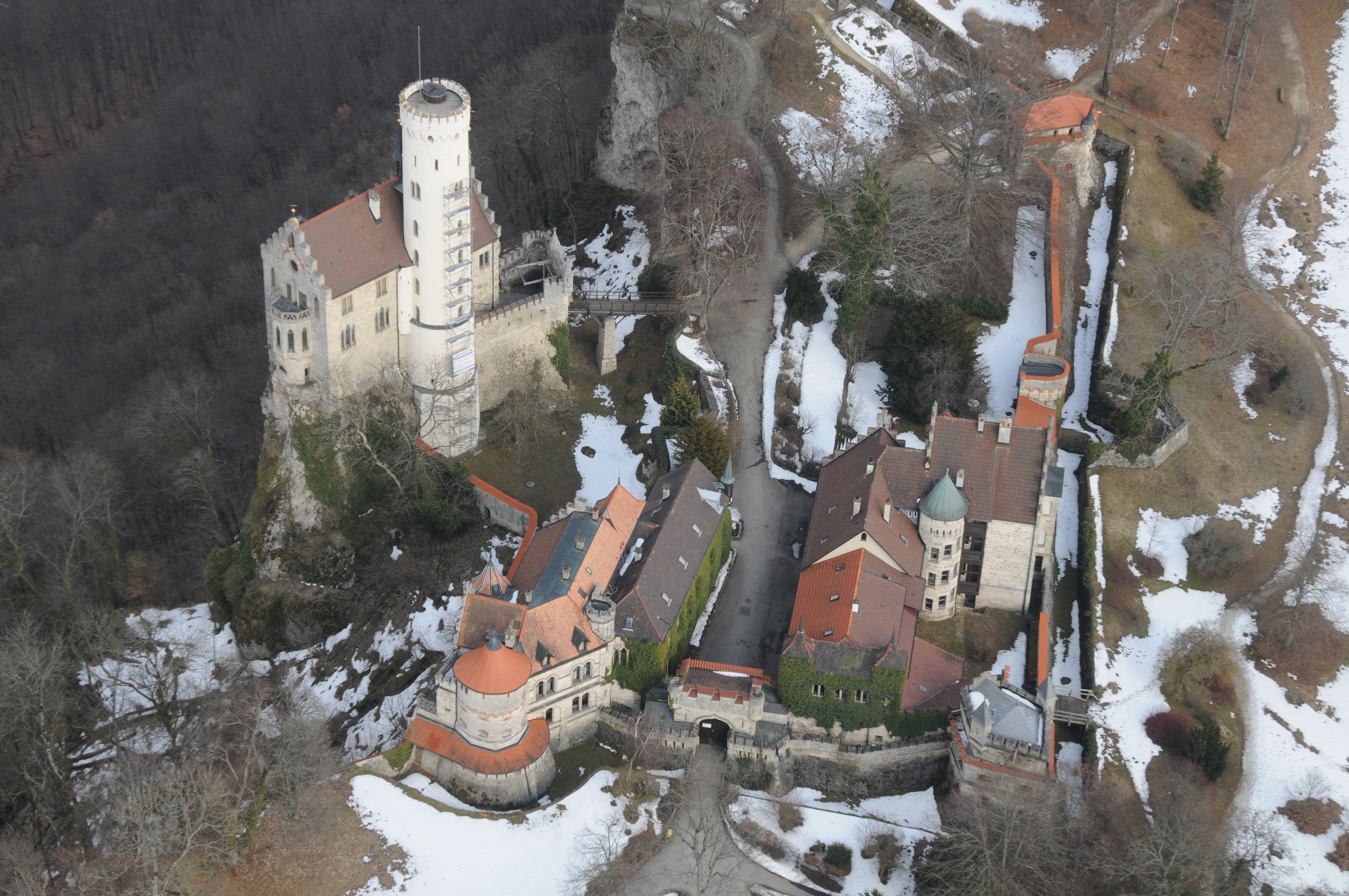
Aerial view

== See also ==
- Hohenzollern Castle
