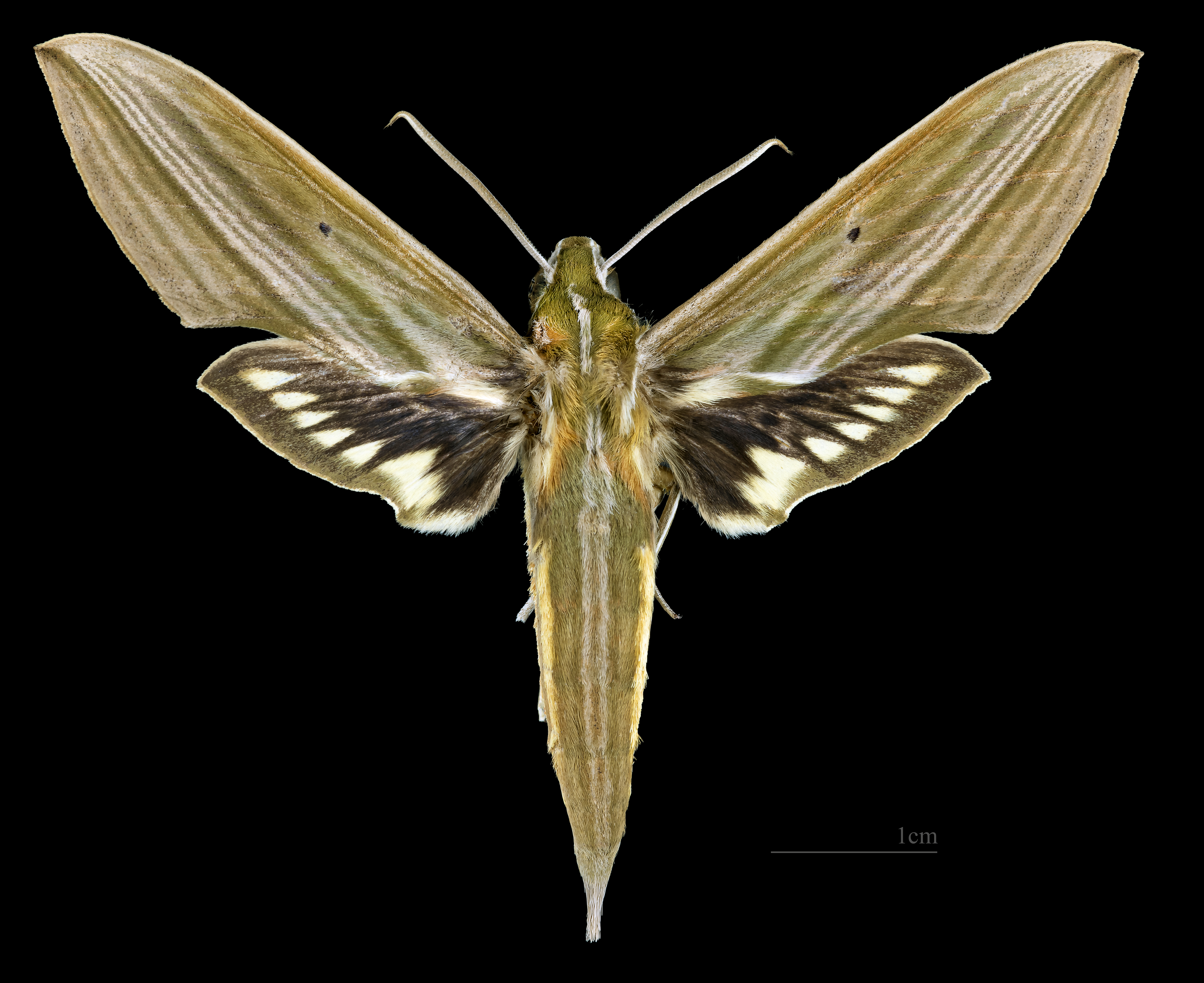
- Male dorsal
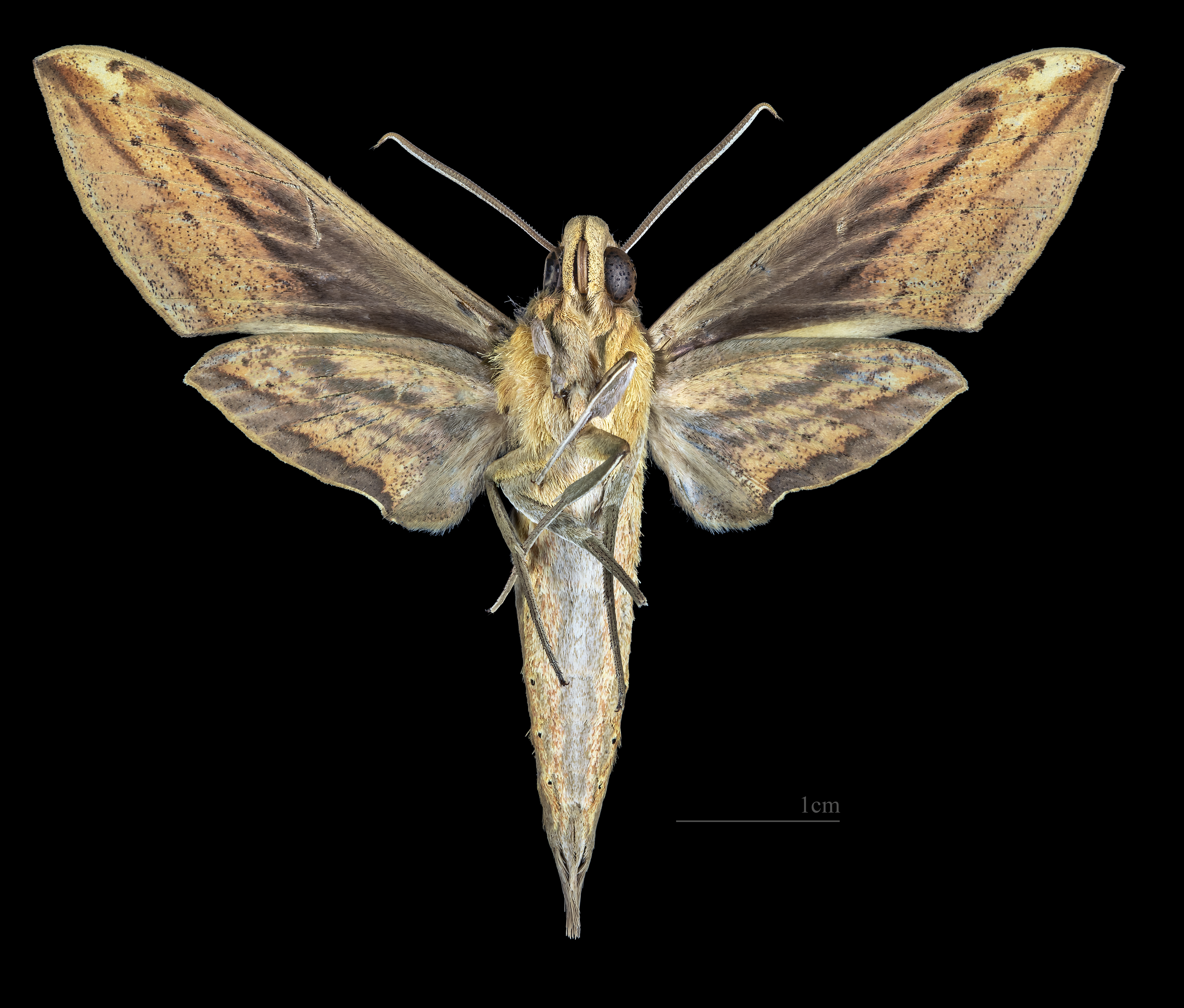
- Male ventral

Scientific classification
- Domain: Eukaryota
- Kingdom: Animalia
- Phylum: Arthropoda
- Class: Insecta
- Order: Lepidoptera
- Family: Sphingidae
- Genus: Xylophanes
- Species: X. indistincta

Binomial name
- Xylophanes indistincta Closs, 1915

Synonyms
- Xylophanes crotonis zikani Clark, 1922

= Xylophanes indistincta =

Species of moth

Xylophanes indistincta is a moth of the family Sphingidae.

== Distribution ==
It is found from south-eastern Brazil.

== Description ==
It is similar to Xylophanes aristor but smaller. The ground colour is mostly grey-green, although the forewing underside has a pale yellow apical area on the costa and an orange-yellow ground colour.

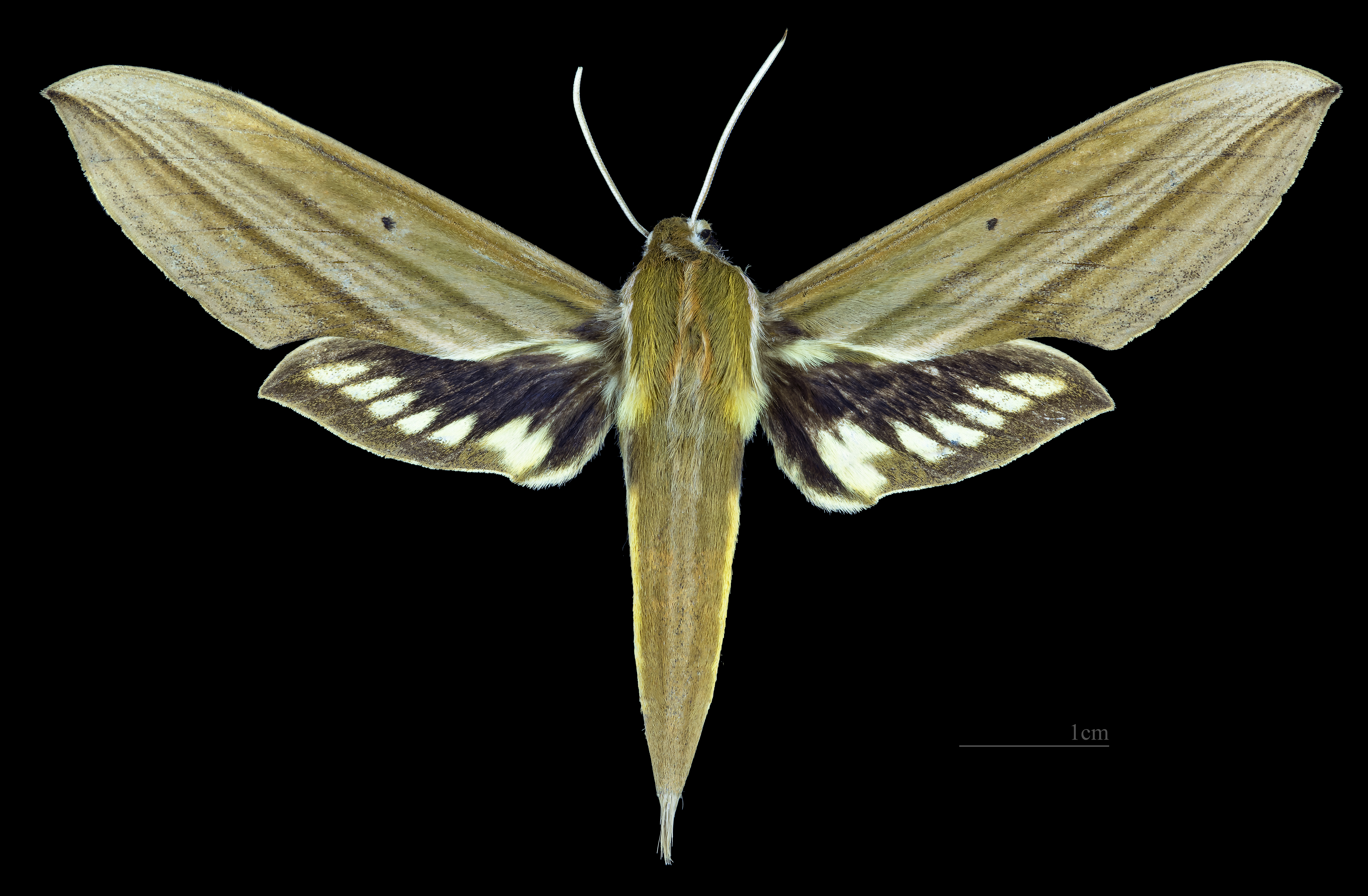
Female dorsal

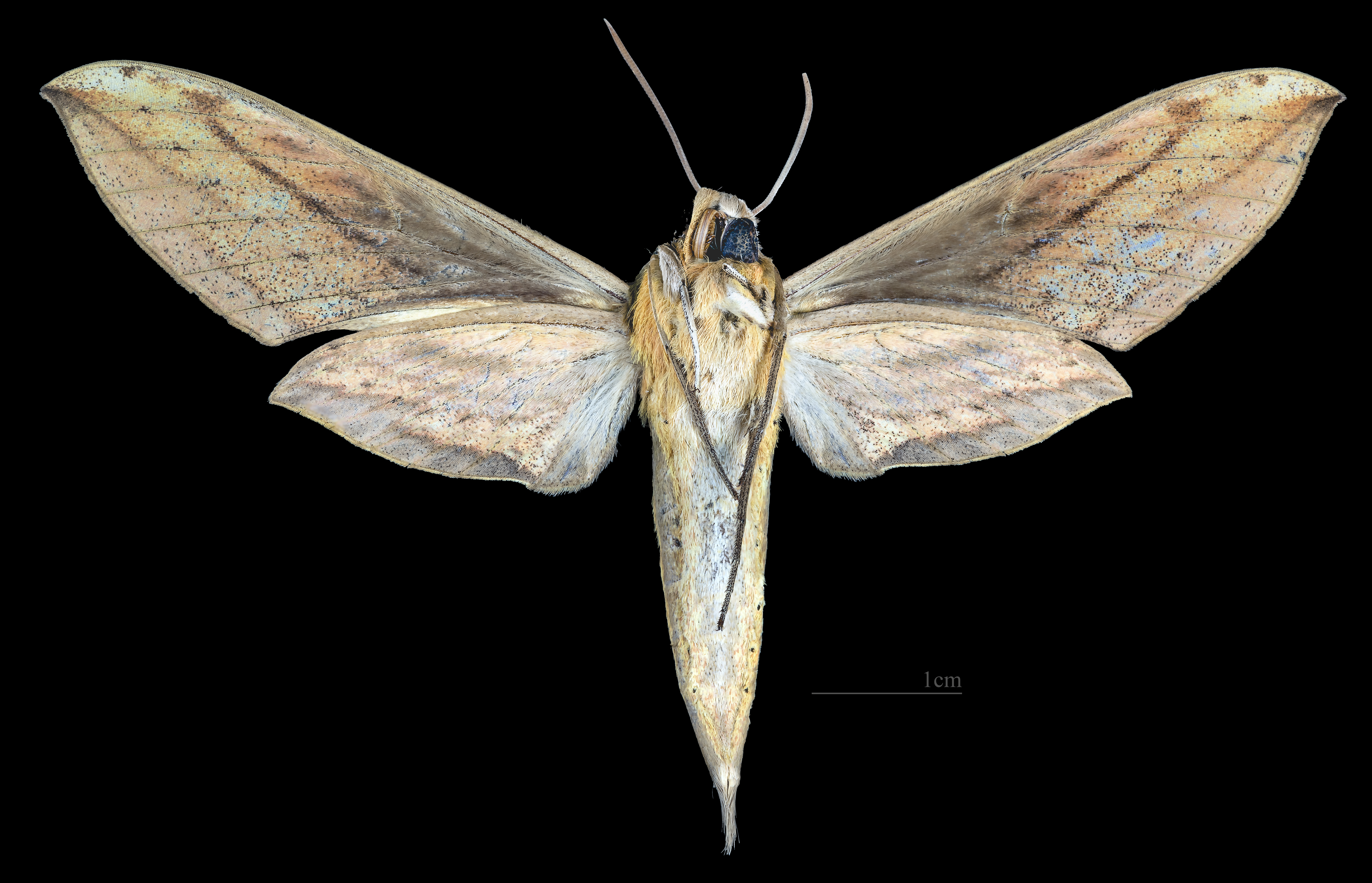
Female ventral

== Biology ==
Adults are probably on wing year-round.

The larvae possibly feed on Psychotria panamensis, Psychotria nervosa and Pavonia guanacastensis.
