= Hearts of Stone (disambiguation) =

"Hearts of Stone" is a rhythm and blues song.

Hearts of Stone may also refer to:

- Hearts of Stone (Southside Johnny and the Asbury Jukes album), 1978
- Hearts of Stone (Stoneground album), 1978
- "Hearts of Stone" (Knight Rider), a 1983 television episode
- Hearts of Stone, a 2015 novel by Simon Scarrow.
- The Witcher 3: Wild Hunt – Hearts of Stone, a 2015 video game expansion for The Witcher 3

== See also ==
- Heart of Stone (disambiguation)
