= Carl Alexander Heideloff =

German architect (1789–1865)

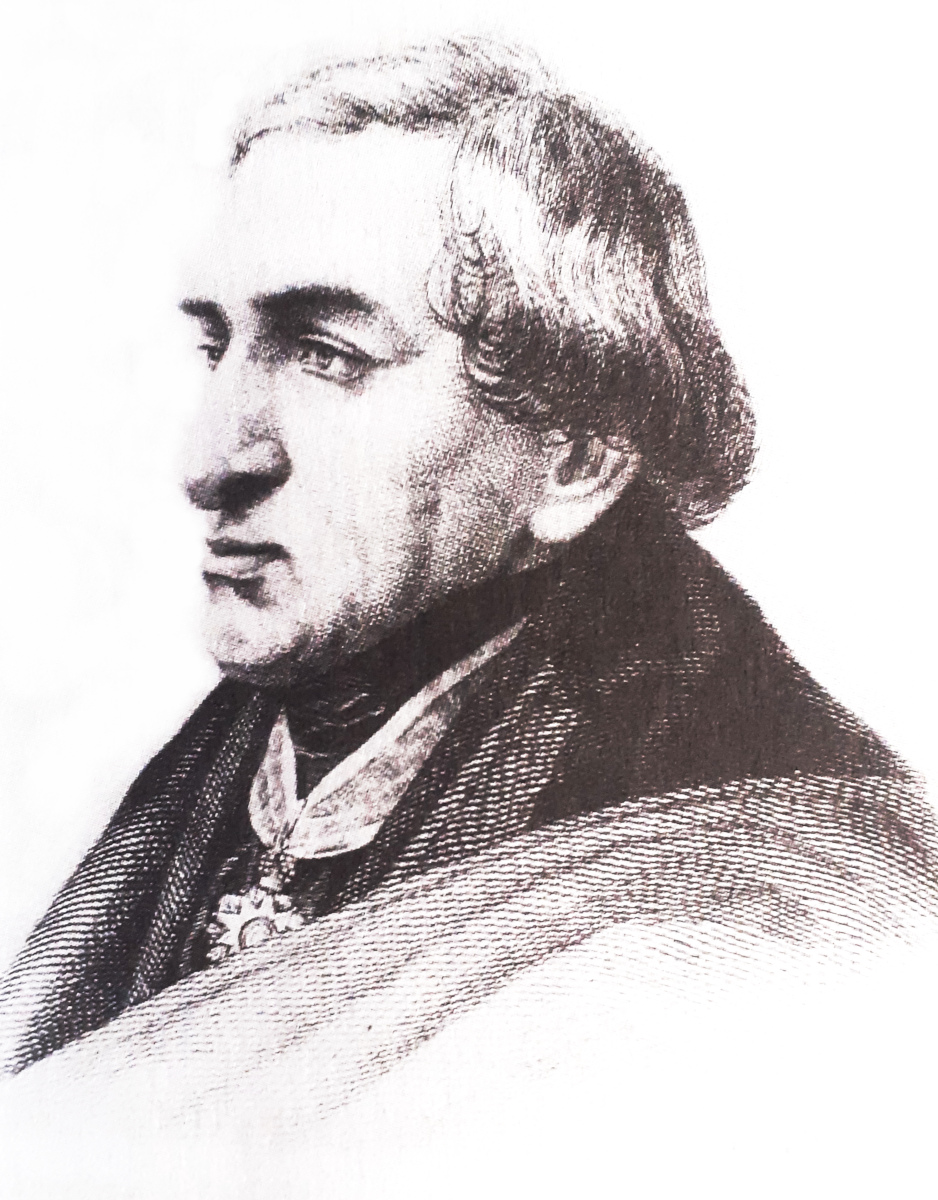
Carl Alexander Heideloff.

Carl Alexander Heideloff (2 February 1789 – 28 September 1865), also known as Karl Alexander von Heideloff, was a German architect, and master builder of Nuremberg. He is also known for his restoration of buildings and monuments.

== Life ==
Born in Stuttgart, he was son of the painter Victor Peter Heideloff. Heideloff initially studied at the Stuttgart Academy of Arts, then spent five years working as an architect in Coburg.

In 1818 he was appointed as the city architect for Nuremberg, and in 1822 he became a professor of architecture at the polytechnic school there, a post he held until 1854. During this time he was also chosen as conservator of artistic monuments.

Heideloff principally worked in the Gothic style of architecture, and the buildings restored and erected by him at Nuremberg and in its neighborhood attest to both his original skill and his purity of taste. He also achieved some success as a painter of watercolours. Heideloff died at Hassfurt in 1865.

== Noted work ==
- Restoration of Nuremberg Castle, 1834–35
- Restoration of Coburg Village, 1838–1844
- Lichtenstein Castle, 1840
- Reinhardsbrunn Castle
- The Hall of the Knights in the fortress at Coburg
- Landsberg castle
- The mortuary chapel in Meiningen
- Rosenburg Castle near Bonn
- The chapel of Rheinstein Castle
- Catholic church in Leipzig
- Restoration of Bamberg Cathedral
- Restoration of the Knights Chapel (Ritter Kapelle) at Hassfurt
- Restoration of the St. Aegidien Church at Oschatz, 1846-1849

== Literary work ==
- Die Lehre von den Säulenordnungen (1827)
- Die architektonischen Glieder, deren Konstruktion, Zusammenstellung und Verzierung (1831) 2 volumes
- Der Kleine Vignola (1832)
- Nürnbergs Baudenkmäler der Vorzeit (1838-1843), (complete edition 1854) - 'Nuremberg's architectural monuments of the Vorzeit'
- Die Ornamentik des Mittelalters (1838-1842) 24 volumes - 'The Ornamental art of the Middle Ages'
