= Heartstone =

Heartstone may refer to:

- Heartstone (novel), a 2010 historical crime novel by C. J. Sansom
- Heartstone (film), a 2016 Icelandic film
- Heartstones, a 1987 novella by Ruth Rendell

== See also ==
- Hearthstone (disambiguation)
