= Lichtenstein (novel) =

Book by Wilhelm Hauff

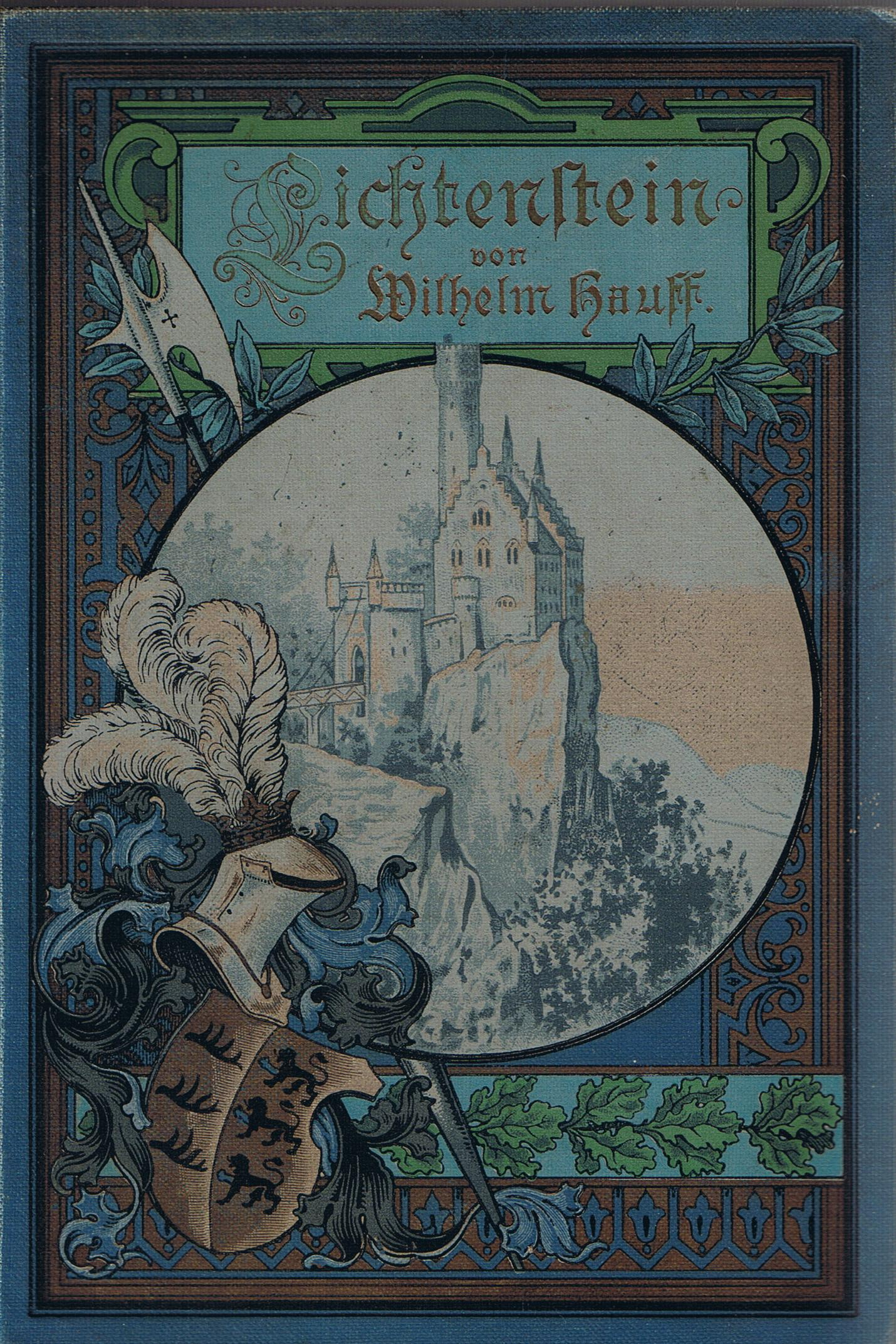
Cover of Wilhelm Hauff's most popular novel, Lichtenstein (1826)

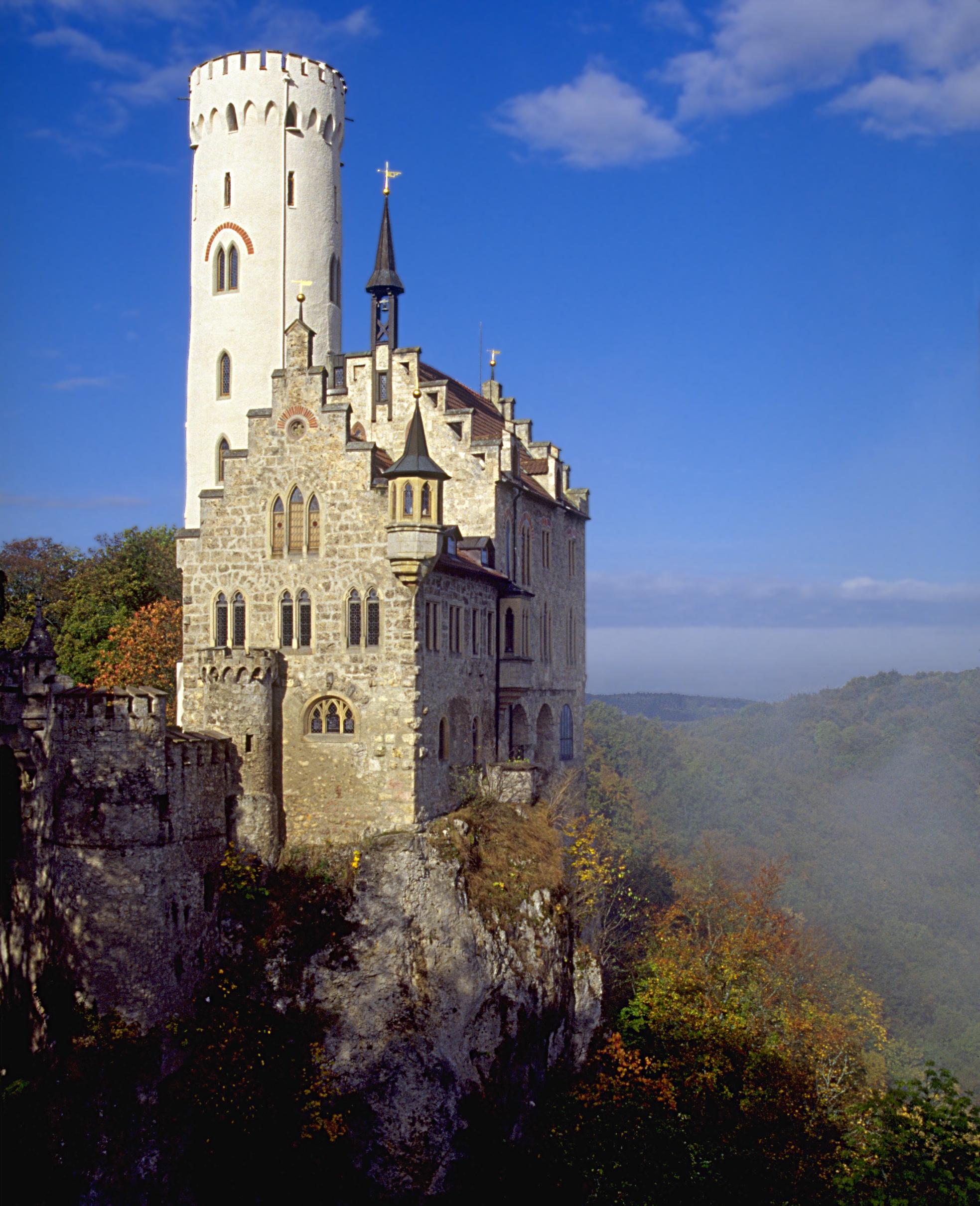
Lichtenstein Castle, inspired by the novel

Lichtenstein. Romantische Sage aus der wuerttembergischen Geschichte (Lichtenstein: Romantic Saga of the History of Württemberg) is a historical novel by Wilhelm Hauff, first published in 1826, the year before his early death. Set in and around Württemberg, it is considered his greatest literary success next to his fairy-tales, and, together with the work of the almost forgotten Benedikte Naubert, represents the beginning of historical novel-writing in Germany.

Hauff follows Sir Walter Scott (and Naubert) by allowing an invented figure in a real family, Georg Sturmfeder, to witness the events during the struggle of Ulrich von Württemberg against the Swabian League under Georg, Truchsess von Waldburg-Zeil, who plays the part of foil to the positively depicted Georg von Frundsberg. Hauff idealises Ulrich as a wronged man, who, in his moment of need, is restored to his rights through the efforts of his people, symbolised by the character of the Piper of Hardt. The historical Ulrich is remembered largely for his exorbitant taxes on meat, wine and fruit, which provoked the Armer Konrad peasant uprising of 1514, quelled only with the help of his enemy the Steward of Waldburg-Zeil.

Lichtenstein was a romantic and patriotic German's tribute to the work of Sir Walter Scott. No foreign author was more popular than Scott in the Germany of the early 19th century. His novels, translated in full, were so generally read, that it was said that the soil of old Scotland was more familiar to Germans than their native land. Yet the hills of Scotland, Hauff said, were not of a richer green than the German Harz, the waves of the Tweed were no bluer than those of the Danube, Scotch men were no braver, Scotch women no lovelier than the old Swabians and Saxons. Lichtenstein, modelled after the Waverley Novels, was a direct protest against the novel with a foreign historical background, and was an attempt to recreate the romance of a bit of Swabian history; as Scott had done for the country of Ivanhoe and Waverley.

The great success of the book prompted the rebuilding of Lichtenstein Castle in 1840–1842. The 1846 opera of the same name by Peter Josef von Lindpaintner is based on this novel.
