= Heart of Stone (1950 film) =

1950 film

- Directed by: Paul Verhoeven
- Written by: Wilhelm Hauff
- Starring: Lutz Moik
- Cinematography: Ernst Kunstmann; Bruno Mondi
- Edited by: Lena Neumann
- Music by: Herbert Trantow
- Distributed by: DEFA
- Release date: 8 December 1950
- Running time: 106 minutes
- Country: East Germany
- Language: German

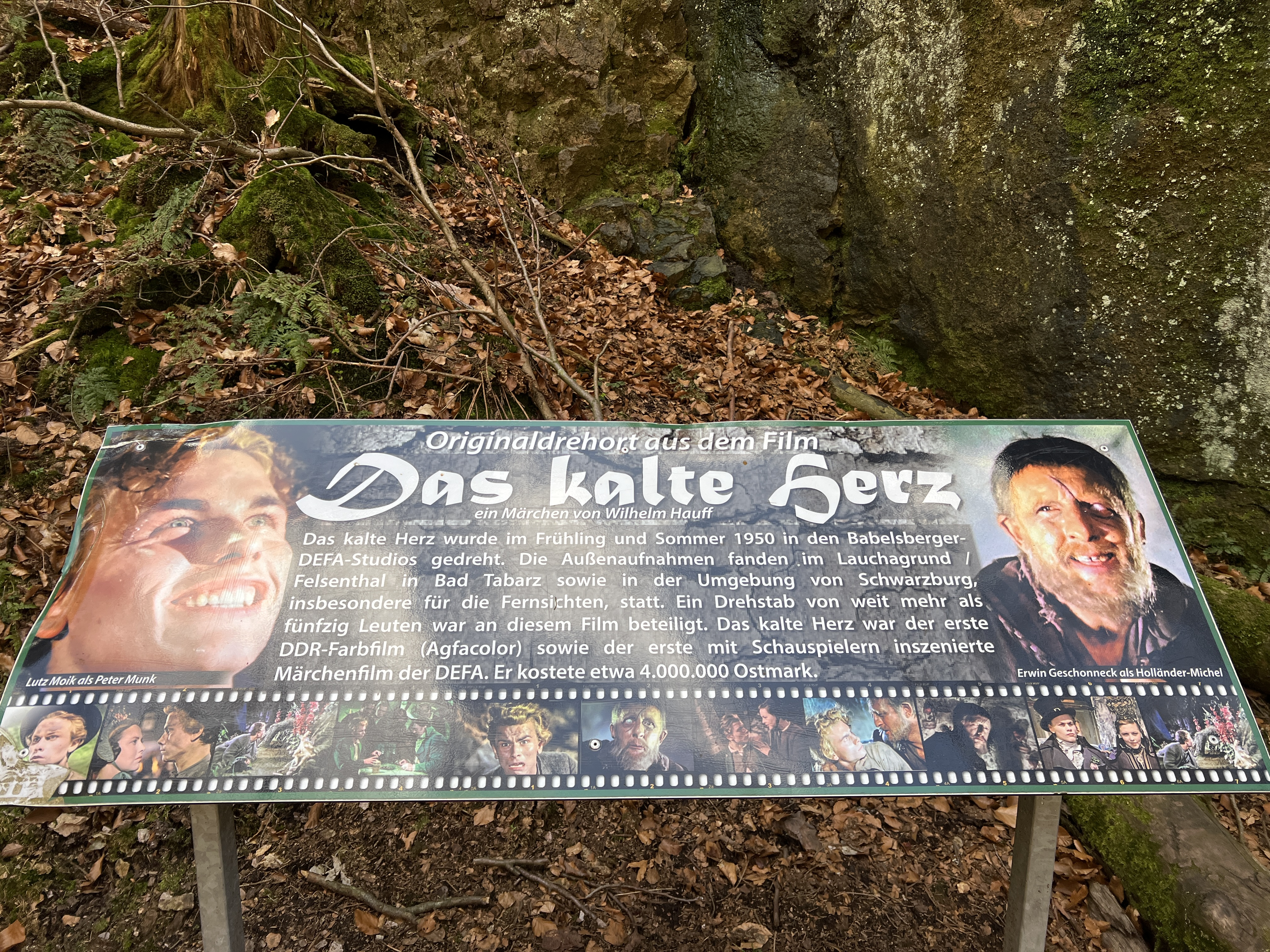
Panel about the filming location in the nature reserve of Kleiner Wagenberg in Thuringia

Heart of Stone (German: Das kalte Herz) is an East German fantasy film directed by Paul Verhoeven. The first East German film made in Agfacolor, it was released in 1950. The film is based on the fairy tale of the same name originally published as a story-within-the-story of Das Wirtshaus im Spessart by Wilhelm Hauff in 1827. Das kalte Herz is the most well-known contribution of Hauff's Märchenalmanach auf das Jahr 1828 ("Fairy Tale Almanac for the Year 1828").

== Plot ==
Peter Munk, a charcoal burner, and his mother live in the Black Forest where they are treated with disdain because of the because of the dirt and the low reputation of the craft. Peter is stung by the ridicule of the wealthier inhabitants of the village – who are also both known for their cold-heartedness and admired due to her wealth. He desires to marry the beautiful Lisbeth, daughter of a widowed and impoverished lumberjack, who is to marry a wealthy man at her uncle's request. Peter sees his only chance for prosperity in appealing to a good forest spirit, the small Glasmännlein, who is known for granting three wishes to everybody born on a Sunday and summons the Glasmännlein with the right spell. The spirit lives in a remote place inmidst of the woods, two hours away from any village. It grants two wishes at first, then a third wish later, if he isn't too foolish. Peter wishes that he can dance as well as the best dancer around and that he would have always as much money in his pocket as a rich man, Ezechiel, who is a gambler. The second wish is for money to buy a glassblower's hut. The Glasmännlein scolds Peter for the foolishness of his wishes, but grants them anyway.

Despite being a wealthy glassmaker now, Peter spends his time in dancing and gambling in the village's inn. One day, Peter isn't able to pay his debts, because, while gambling, he won all day against Ezechiel and, according to Peter's own wish to always have as much money in his pocket as the rich Ezechiel, Peter now has no money, too. The glassworks is to be auctioned off.

Unable to marry Lisbeth due to his being pursued by creditors, Peter locates another forest spirit, the giant and dark Holländermichel, to wish for more money. Holländermichel agrees to grant him wealth, but only in exchange for Peter's heart that Holländermichel replaces with a heartshaped stone. Holländermichel shows that the wealthier inhabitants of the village already have done so and shows Peter their hearts, still alive, that he displays on the wall. Peter agrees and becomes a ruthlessly successful businessman but at the cost of his feelings and his soul.

His stone heart makes him even more ruthless as the other wealthy men of the village. He feels neither pain nor scruples, neither compassion nor love. Growing ever more stingy, Peter lets his destitute mother live in her miserable hut and chases beggars away from his front door. One day, in a fit of anger, he even slays his Lisbeth (whom he had since married), because she gave away a glass of wine to a frail old man, which was in fact the Glasmännlein in disguise. In his despair, Peter seeks out the Glasmännlein in the thicket of fir trees, hoping for his last, unfulfilled wish. The Glasmännlein confronts Peter with what he has become and advises him to use a trick to get his heart back from the Holländermichel. This works and Peter is distraught over his misdeed. The Glasmännlein grants Peter as the last wish to undo everything. Peter is to strike a tree with his axe, and as soon as he does so, he will have his old life back. As he does that, he can see Lisbeth between the trees. Together, they walk hand in hand toward their future.

== Background ==
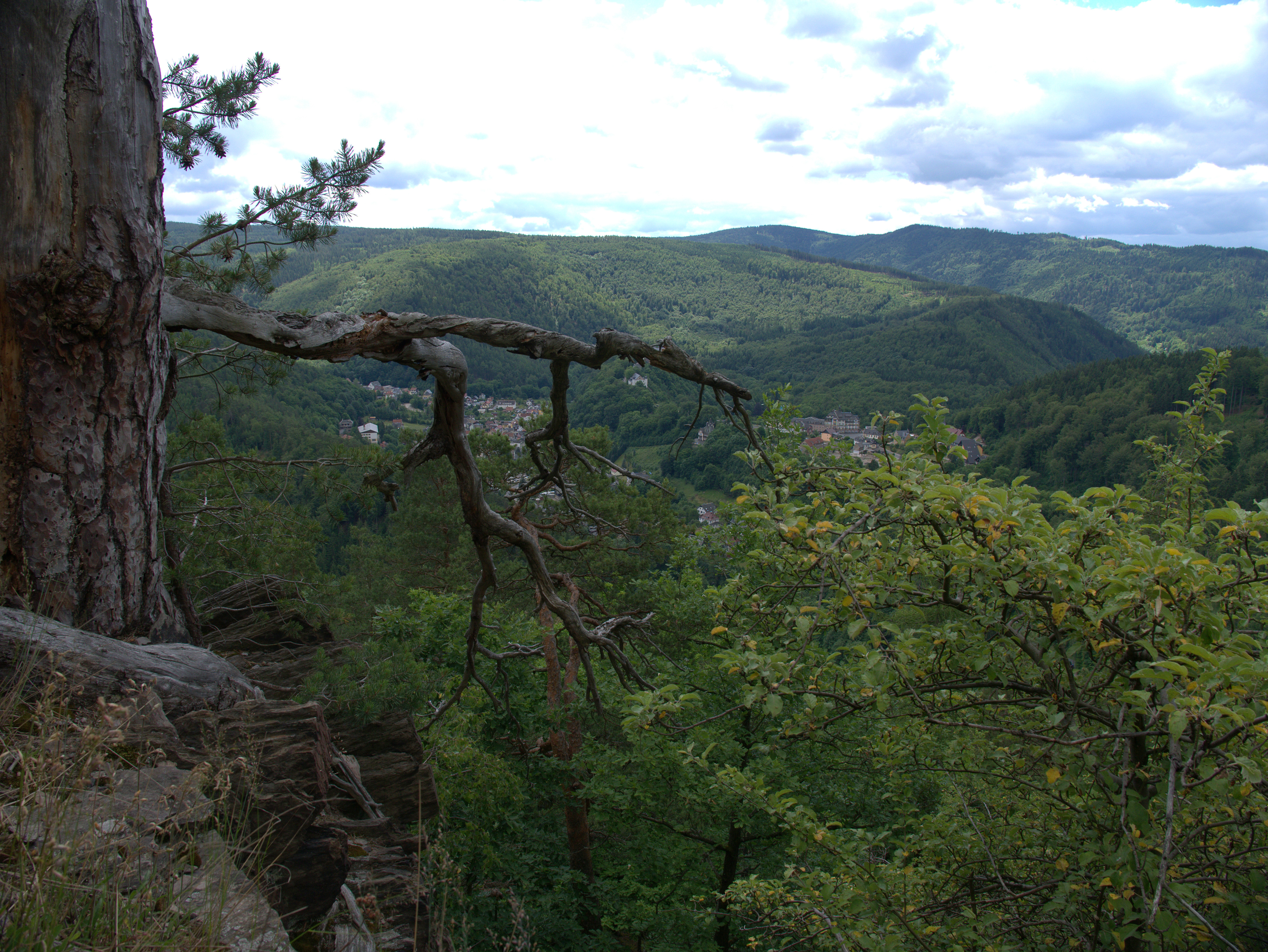
Location in the Thuringian Forest

The film was originally intended to be directed by Erich Engel, but finally given to Paul Verhoeven, who filmed Heart of Stone in spring and summer of 1950, primarily at the historic Babelsberg Studio. Further shots were filmed in the valley of Lauchagrund near Tabarz and in the area around Schwarzburg, as the DEFA film for obvious reasons couldn't be done in the Black Forest which belonged to West-Germany.

A crew of well over fifty people worked on this film. At 3.2 million marks, production costs significantly exceeded the budget. Heart of Stone was the first East German color film (Agfacolor) and the first DEFA fairy tale film to feature real actors. The premiere took place on 8 December, 1950.

The film is one of the most successful DEFA pictures of all time, and sold 9,779,526 tickets at its start in 1950.

== Cast ==
- Lutz Moik as Peter Munk
- Hanna Rucker as Lisbeth
- Paul Bildt as the Glasmännlein
- Erwin Geschonneck as Holländermichel
- Paul Esser as Ezechiel
- Lotte Loebinger as Peter Munk's mother
- Alexander Engel as Lisbeth's uncle
- Hannsgeorg Laubenthal as Hannes
- Karl Hellmer as Master Anton
- Walter Tarrach as bailiff
- Eva Probst as Bärbel
- Herbert Kiper as wedding inviter
- Karl Heinz Deickert as Elias
- Victor Janson as Dutch nobleman
- Hans Krull as gunner
- Ruth Lommel as the village beauty
- Otto Stoeckel as innkeeper in the Black Forest
