= Wilhelm Hauff =

German poet and novelist

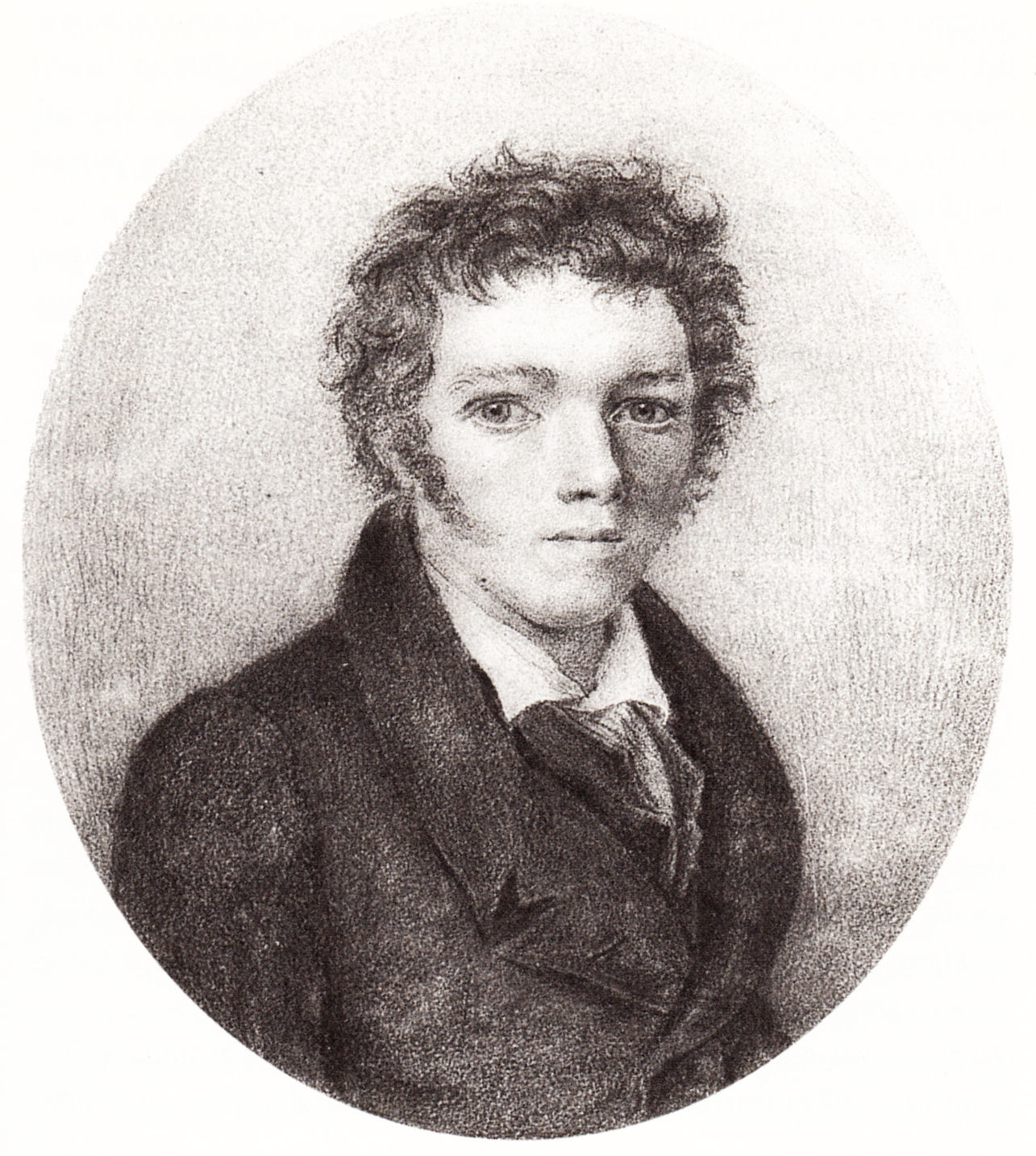
- Born: 29 November 1802; Stuttgart, Duchy of Württemberg
- Died: 18 November 1827 (aged 24); Stuttgart, Kingdom of Württemberg
- Education: University of Tübingen (PhD)
- Occupations: Poet, novelist
- Writing career
- Language: German
- Genres: Poetry, fiction

Wilhelm Hauff (29 November 1802 – 18 November 1827) was a German poet and novelist known for his stories and novels. Raised in Stuttgart and educated in Tübingen, he wrote fairy tales such as Der kleine Muck (Little Muck) and Das kalte Herz (Heart of Stone), the historical romance Lichtenstein, and the parody Der Mann im Mond (The Man in the Moon). He died of typhoid fever at age 24. Blending exotic and fantastic motifs with German settings, his tales remain popular in German-speaking countries.

== Early life ==
Hauff was born in Stuttgart, the son of August Friedrich Hauff, a secretary in the Württemberg ministry of foreign affairs, and Hedwig Wilhelmine Elsaesser Hauff. He was the second of four children.

Hauff lost his father when he was seven years old, and his early education was practically self-gained in the library of his maternal grandfather at Tübingen, where his mother had moved after the death of her husband. In 1818 he was sent to the Klosterschule at Blaubeuren, and in 1820 began to study at the University of Tübingen. In four years he completed his philosophical and theological studies at the Tübinger Stift, graduating with a PhD.

== Writings ==
On leaving the university, Hauff became tutor to the children of the Württemberg minister of war, General Baron Ernst Eugen von Hugel (1774–1849), and for them wrote his Märchen (fairy tales), which he published in his Märchen Almanach auf das Jahr 1826 (Fairytale Almanac of 1826 published as Tales of the Caravan, Inn, and Palace. in the US). Some of these stories are very popular in German-speaking countries to this day, such as Der kleine Muck (Little Muck), Kalif Storch (Caliph Stork) and Die Geschichte von dem Gespensterschiff (The Tale of the Ghost Ship)—all set in the Orient—as well as Der Zwerg Nase (Little Longnose), Das kalte Herz (Heart of Stone) and Das Wirtshaus im Spessart (The Spessart Inn), set in Germany.

A story from Tales of the Caravan, "Die Geschichte von der abgehauenen Hand" (The Severed Hand) was included in the 10 volume anthology Stories by Foreign Authors (German Volume 2) published in English translation by Charles Scribner's Sons in 1898.

He also wrote the first part of the Mitteilungen aus den Memoiren des Satan (1826; Memoirs of Beelzebub) and Der Mann im Mond (1825; The Man in the Moon). The latter, a parody of the sentimental and sensual novels of Heinrich Clauren (the pseudonym of Carl Gottlieb Samuel Heun, 1771–1854), became in the course of composition a close imitation of that author's style and was actually published under his name. As a result, Clauren brought and won an action for damages against Hauff, whereupon Hauff followed up the attack in his witty and sarcastic Kontroverspredigt über H. Clauren und den Mann im Mond (1826) and attained his original object: the moral annihilation of the -according to him – mawkish and unhealthy literature with which Clauren was flooding the country.

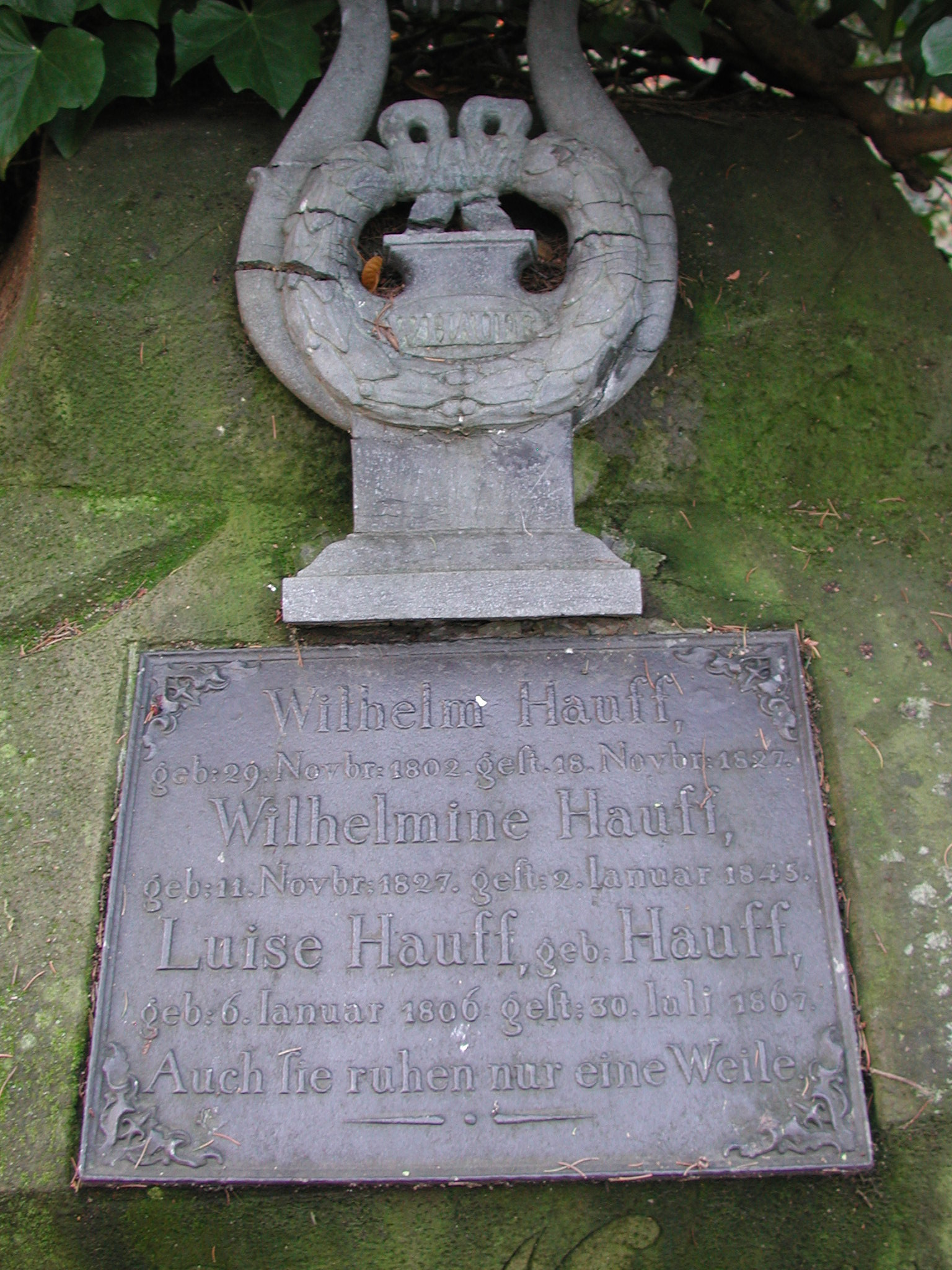
Wilhelm Hauff's grave stone in Stuttgart, Germany.

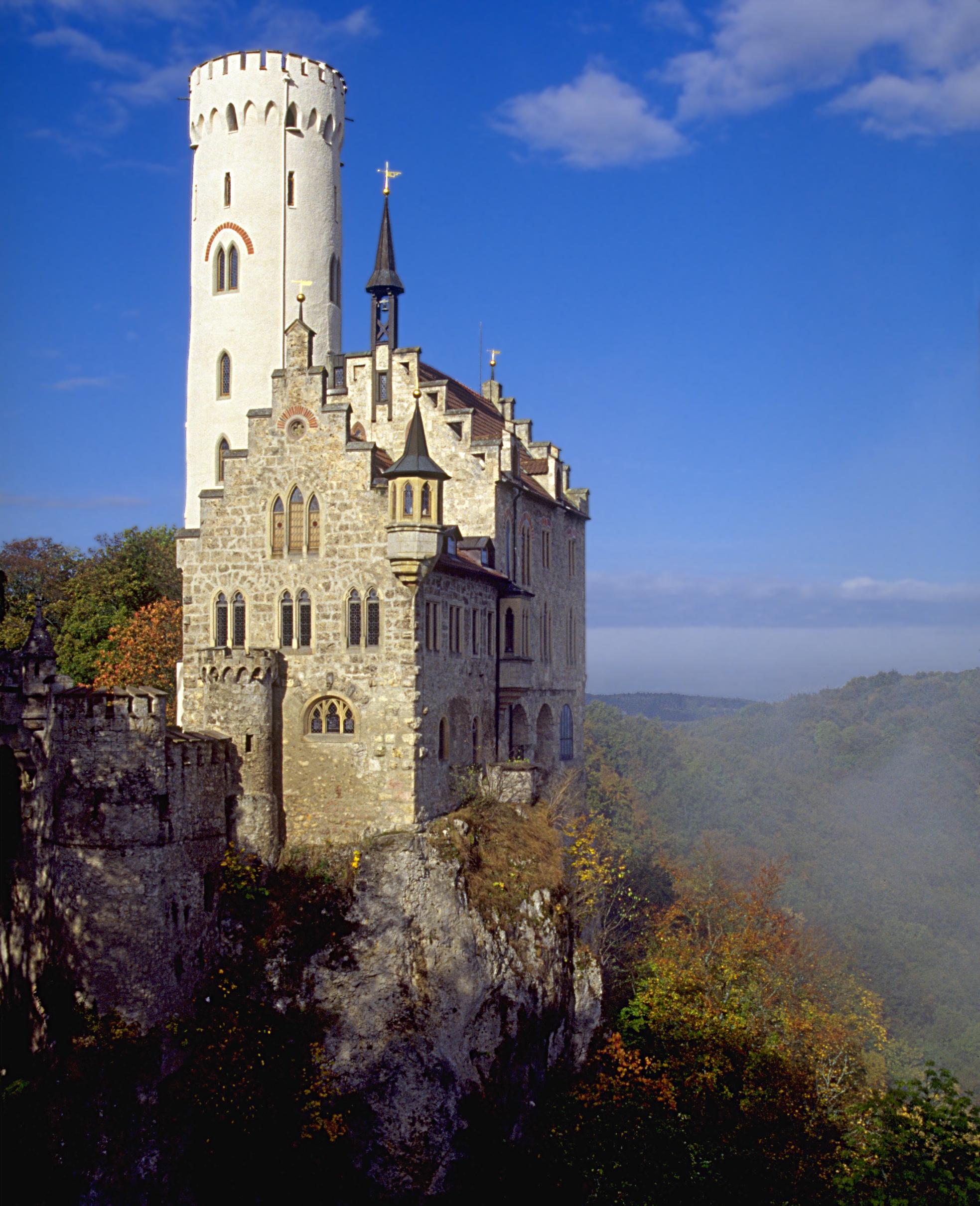
Lichtenstein Castle

Meanwhile, inspired by Sir Walter Scott's novels, Hauff wrote the historical romance Lichtenstein: Romantische Sage aus der wuerttembergischen Geschichte (1826; Lichtenstein: Romantic Saga from the History of Württemberg), which became hugely popular in Germany and especially in Swabia, treating as it did the most interesting period in the history of that country, the reign of Duke Ulrich (1487–1550). This novel was the inspiration for Duke Ulrich's heir, Duke Wilhelm of Urach, to rebuild the castle, which had fallen into disrepair, in accordance with Hauff's description.

While on a journey to France, the Netherlands, and northern Germany he wrote the second part of the Memoiren des Satan and some short novels, among them the charming Die Bettlerin vom Pont des Arts (1826; The True Lover's Fortune; or, the Beggar of the Pont des Arts) and his masterpiece, the novella Phantasien im Bremer Ratskeller (1827; The Wine-Ghosts of Bremen). He also published some short poems, which have passed into Volkslieder, among them "Morgenrot, Morgenrot, leuchtest mir zum frühen Tod?" ("Dawn's light, you are lighting my way to early death") and "Steh ich in finstrer Mitternacht" ("I stand in the darkest midnight"). The novella Jud Süß ("Süss the Jew"), "naïvely anti-Semitic", was published in 1827 by Wilhelm Hauff; a film version (different from Hauff's novella) was produced by the Nazi Party as propaganda in 1940.

In January 1827, Hauff undertook the editorship of the Stuttgart Morgenblatt and in the following month married his cousin Luise Hauff, but his happiness was cut short by his death from typhoid fever on 18 November 1827.

== Editions ==
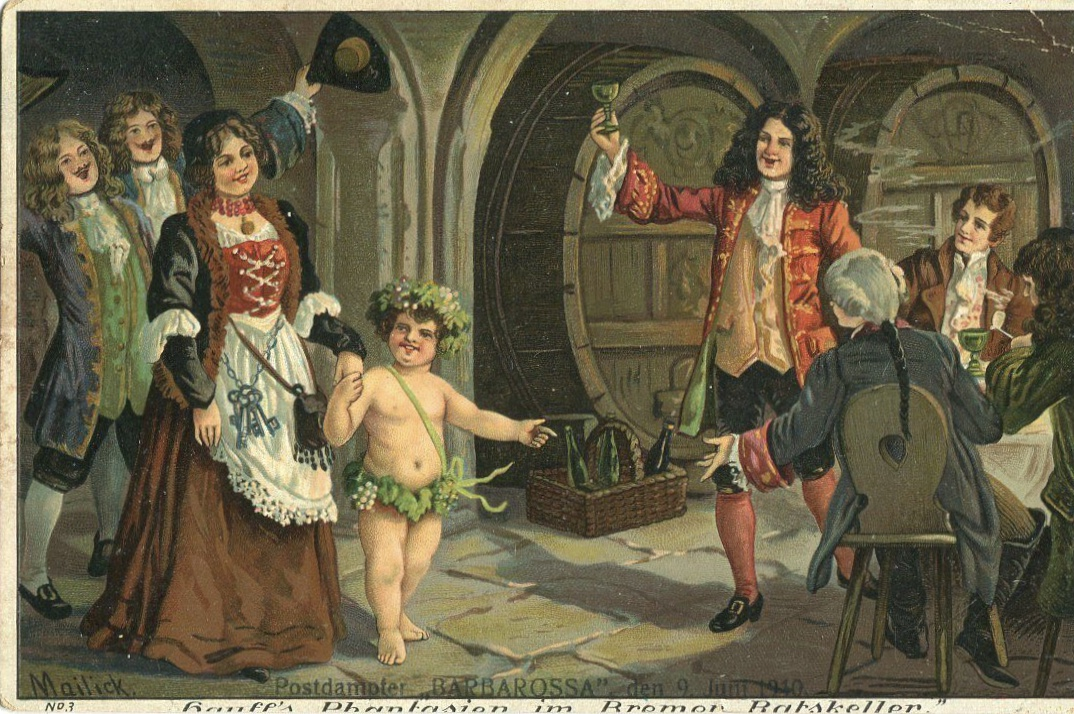
Hauff's Phantasies in a Bremen Cellar, by Alfred Mailick

His Sämtliche Werke (Collected works), with a biography, edited by Gustav Schwab were published in 3 volumes 1830–1834, and 5 volumes (18th ed.) in 1882. They were also published by Felix Bobertag 1891–1897. A selection from his works was published by M. Mendheim (3 vols, 1891). A six-volume edition, with a biographical introduction by Alfred Weile, was published in 1911 by A. Weichert.

Christopher Morley's English translations of Hauff's short story "The Young Foreigner" and Alfred de Musset's tale "The Story of a White Blackbird" were published together in book form by Doubleday in 1925.

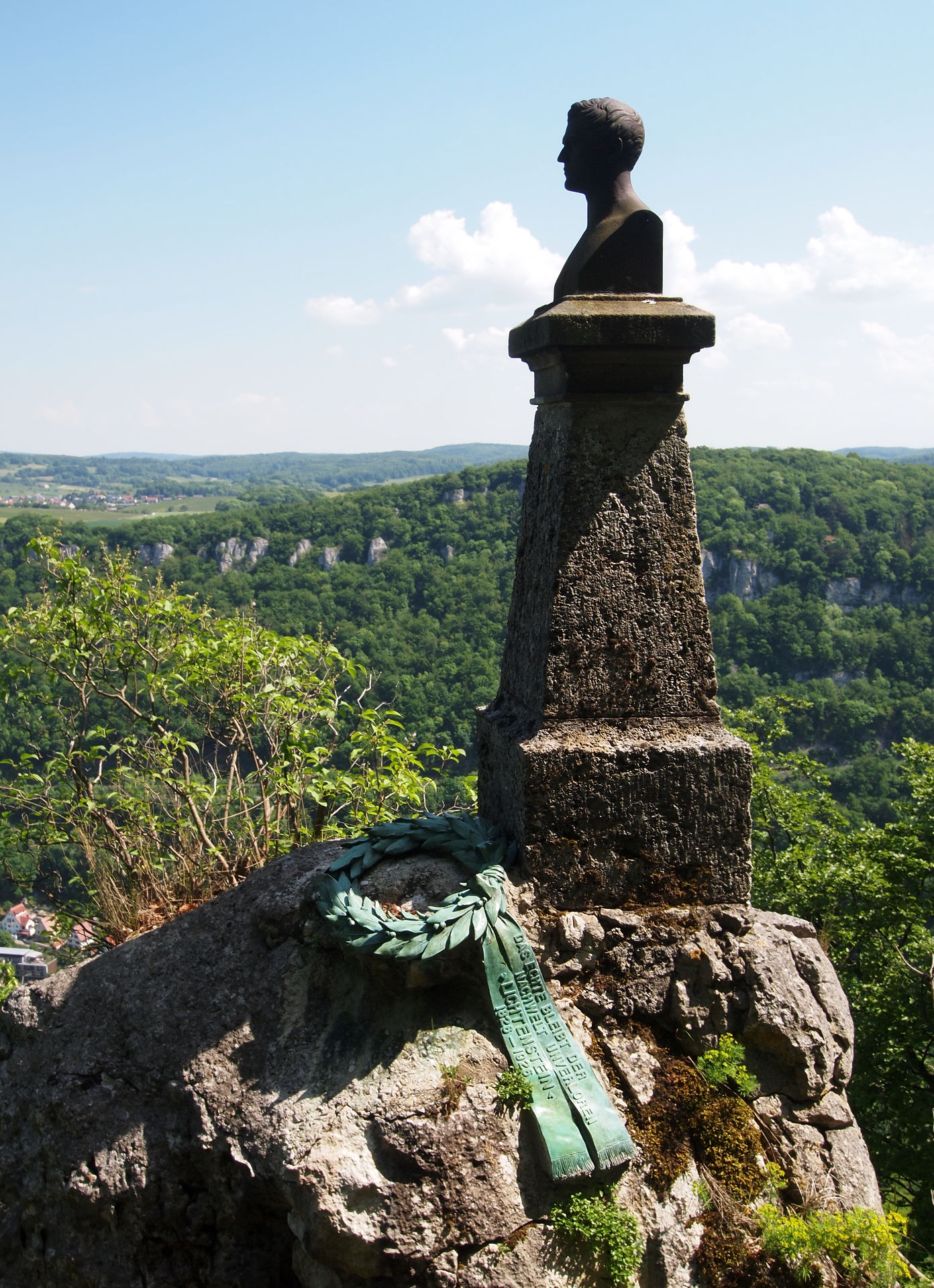
Memorial near Lichtenstein

== See also ==
- “Auf Posten,” a lieder by Elise Schmezer (1810–1856) based on text by Hauff
- Das kalte Herz (The Heart of Stone), feature film, 1950, East Germany, director Paul Verhoeven.
- Geschichte vom kleinen Muck, a 1953 film.
- Калиф-аист (Caliph Stork), Soviet live action film, 1968.
- Сказка, рассказанная ночью, Soviet feature film based on the stories The Marble Heart and The Spessart Inn, USSR, 1981.
- Халиф-аист, Soviet animation, based on one of the stories (Caliph Stork), 1981.
- Little Longnose, a 2003 Russian animated feature based on one of his stories.

== Sources ==
- This work in turn cites:
  - Julius Klaiber, Wilhelm Hauff, ein Lebensbild (1881)
  - Max Mendheim, Hauffs Leben und Werke (1894)
  - Hans Hofmann, W. Hauff (1902)
