= Urach =

Urach may refer to:

- Bad Urach, a town in Baden-Württemberg, Germany
- Urach (Breg), a river of Baden-Württemberg, Germany, tributary of the Hammerbach
- Duke of Urach, a title in the Kingdom of Württemberg
- House of Urach, a morganatic cadet branch of the formerly royal House of Württemberg
- Kuno von Urach (Cuno of Praeneste, died 1122), German Cardinal and papal legate, diplomatic figure
- Ludwig I, Count of Württemberg-Urach (1412–1450), Count of Württemberg
- Ludwig II, Count of Württemberg-Urach (1439–1457), Count of Württemberg
- Wilhelm, Duke of Urach (1810–1869), first Head of the House of Urach
- Wilhelm Karl, Duke of Urach (1864–1928), German prince, King of Lithuania, with the regnal name of Mindaugas II
- Princess Elisabeth of Urach (1894–1962), wife of Prince Karl Aloys of Liechtenstein
- Wilhelm von Urach (1897–1957), member of the House of Württemberg, automotive production engineer
- Karl Gero, Duke of Urach (1899–1981), head of the morganatic Urach branch of the House of Württemberg
- Albrecht von Urach (1903–1969), German nobleman, artist and wartime author, journalist, linguist and diplomat
- Wilhelm Albert, Duke of Urach (born 1957), head of the morganatic Urach branch of the House of Württemberg
- Andressa Urach (born 1987), Brazilian model, businesswoman and reality television personality
