= Duchess Amalie in Bavaria =

- Duchess of Urach
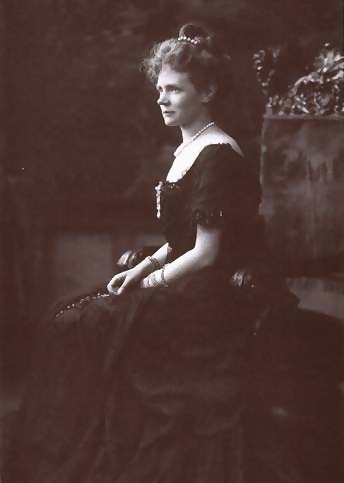
- Amalie, circa 1909
- Born: 24 December 1865; Munich, Kingdom of Bavaria
- Died: 26 May 1912 (aged 46); Stuttgart, Kingdom of Württemberg
- Spouse: Wilhelm Karl, Duke of Urach (m. 1892)
- Issue: Princess Marie Gabriele; Princess Elisabeth; Princess Karola; Prince Wilhelm; Karl Gero, Duke of Urach; Princess Margarete; Prince Albrecht; Prince Eberhard; Princess Mechtilde
Names
- German: Amalie Maria
- House: Wittelsbach
- Father: Duke Karl Theodor in Bavaria
- Mother: Princess Sophie of Saxony

Duchess Amélie in Bavaria (24 December 1865 – 4 May 1912) was a member of the House of Wittelsbach and a Duchess of Urach through her marriage to Wilhelm Karl, Duke of Urach. She was close to her cousin, Archduchess Marie Valerie of Austria, and was often called Amélie in her family.

== Early years ==
Born in Munich, Amélie was the only child of the celebrated oculist Karl Theodor, Duke in Bavaria, and his first wife, Princess Sophie of Saxony. She was a niece of Empress Elisabeth of Austria ("Sisi") and a first cousin of Archduke Franz Ferdinand of Austria.

Her mother died when Amélie was only two years old. She was subsequently raised by her father and her stepmother, Infanta Maria José of Portugal, in an environment that balanced strict court etiquette with her father's scientific interests.

== Marriage and later life ==
On 4 July 1892, Amélie married Wilhelm Karl, Duke of Urach in Tegernsee. Together, They had nine children:

- Princess Marie Gabriele (1893–1908), died unmarried
- Princess Elizabeth (1894–1962) who married Prince Karl of Liechtenstein (1878–1955), an uncle of Franz Joseph II, Prince of Liechtenstein, and had issue.
- Princess Karola (1896–1980), died unmarried
- Prince Wilhelm (1897–1957), who morganatically married Elisabeth Theurer (1899–1988) and had children
- Karl Gero, Duke of Urach (1899–1981), 3rd Duke of Urach, who married Countess Gabriele of Waldburg-Zeil (1910–2005); no issue.
- Princess Margarete (1901–1975), died unmarried
- Prince Albrecht (1903–1969), he married twice times and had children from both marriages.
- Prince Eberhard (1907–1969), who married Princess Iniga of Thurn and Taxis, and had issue. Eberhard and Iniga are the parents of Prince Inigo of Urach.
- Princess Mechtilde (1912–2001), who married Friedrich Karl, Prince of Hohenlohe-Waldenburg-Schillingsfürst and had issue.

She died after giving birth to her ninth child, the cause of death believed to be a pulmonary embolism in Stuttgart.

== Ancestry ==
Ancestors of Duchess Amalie in Bavaria

8. Duke Pius August in Bavaria
4. Duke Maximilian Joseph in Bavaria
9. Princess Amélie Louise of Arenberg
2. Duke Karl Theodor in Bavaria
10. Maximilian I Joseph of Bavaria
5. Princess Ludovika of Bavaria
11. Princess Caroline of Baden
1. Duchess Amalie in Bavaria
12. Maximilian, Hereditary Prince of Saxony
6. John of Saxony
13. Princess Carolina of Parma
3. Princess Sophie of Saxony
14. Maximilian I Joseph of Bavaria (= 10)
7. Princess Amalie Auguste of Bavaria
15. Princess Caroline of Baden (= 11)

Duchess Amalie in Bavaria House of Wittelsbach Born: 24 December 1865 Died: 26 May 1912
German nobility
Preceded by Princess Florestine of Monaco	Duchess of Urach; 4 July 1892 – 26 May 1912	Succeeded by Princess Wiltrud of Bavaria
