= Albrecht von Urach =

German prince, diplomat and artist

Prince Albrecht of Urach
- Prince of Urach; Count of Württemberg
- Born: Fürst Albrecht von Urach, Graf von Württemberg; October 18, 1903; Stuttgart, Kingdom of Württemberg, German Empire
- Died: December 11, 1969 (aged 66); Waldenburg, Baden-Württemberg, West Germany
- Burial: Waldenburg, Baden-Württemberg
- Spouse: Rosemary Blackadder (m. 1931–1938) Ute Waldschmidt (m. 1943–1960)
- Issue: Marie-Gabrielle von Urach; Peter von Urach; Manuela von Urach
Names
- Albrecht Maria Alexander Philipp Joseph von Urach
- House: House of Württemberg (Urach branch)
- Father: Wilhelm Karl, Duke of Urach
- Mother: Duchess Amalie in Bavaria
- Religion: Roman Catholic
- Occupation: Artist, journalist, diplomat

Prince Albrecht of Urach (German: Fürst Albrecht von Urach, Graf von Württemberg; 18 October 1903 – 11 December 1969) was a German nobleman, artist and wartime author, journalist, linguist and diplomat.

== Background ==
He was the third son of Wilhelm Karl, Duke of Urach (1864–1928), a German general in the First World War who was briefly chosen as king of Lithuania. His mother was Amalie (1865–1912), daughter of Karl-Theodor, Duke in Bavaria. The Urach family are a morganatic branch of the royal family that ruled the Kingdom of Württemberg until 1918. They lived in Stuttgart and at Lichtenstein Castle, and paid frequent visits to Monaco before 1914.

His father's mother was Princess Florestine of Monaco (1833–1897), and so he was named after her nephew Prince Albert I of Monaco. His father was next but one in line to Monaco's throne up to the 1911 Monégasque Revolution, as Albert I had no legitimate grandchildren. Even before the First World War, France could not tolerate a possible U-boat base so close to Toulon, and preferred a descent from Albert's son Prince Louis, who had had a career in the French army for many years. Louis therefore adopted his natural daughter, Charlotte, to ensure a pro-French succession, and Monaco signed a concessive treaty with France in July 1918. Though he was the third Von Urach son, according to the Chicago Daily Tribune Prince Albrecht was in Paris in March 1930, unsuccessfully trying to persuade the French Foreign Office to accept him as the respectable and legitimate heir of Prince Louis after the recent divorce of Louis' daughter and son-in-law.

== Artist ==
Following the German defeat in 1918, Albrecht studied art in Stuttgart under Arnold Waldschmidt and Christian Landenberger, and then in Paris at the Académie de la Grande Chaumière in 1927–30, while living on the Île de la Cité, developing an expressionist style. He then exhibited in 1930-32 at the Leicester and Redfern galleries in London, Galerie Bonaparte in Paris and at Blomquist in Oslo, but could not make a living from painting with the start of the Great Depression, and took up freelance photography. His artistic friends included Willi Baumeister and Fernand Léger. His signature on his paintings was usually "AvU". His artistic output resumed in the 1950s.

== Photo-journalist ==
In April 1934 he was living in Venice, renting a flat from Alma Mahler, and by chance photographed the first unpublicized meeting of Mussolini and Hitler, which was followed by a public rally in the Piazza San Marco. Albrecht turned this scoop into a permanent position as a journalist based in Tokyo from September 1934, covering the Chinese-Japanese war and also the Nomonhan incident for several German newspapers. To become a journalist he was required to join the Nazi party in 1934. By chance the German military attaché and then ambassador in Tokyo, Eugen Ott, had served under his father in 1914–18, and their regular drinking friend was Richard Sorge, the famous Red Army spy.

== Second World War ==
In early 1939 he returned to Europe and was posted to Rome as the Foreign Office liaison between the German and Italian Press, and made friends with Count Ciano. A supporter in the Foreign Office was Ernst von Weizsäcker, whose family had worked with Albrecht's family in the past. In 1940 he brought neutral American and Italian journalists to report on the invasion of Norway, and then in 1941 during the invasion of Russia. Following the Tripartite Pact between Germany, Japan and Italy signed in September 1940, he was sent on a secret mission to Japan in May and June 1941 to persuade the Japanese to attack the British in Asia; ostensibly the mission was for the co-operation of the German and Japanese press services. In April 1941 Yosuke Matsuoka agreed a neutrality pact between Japan and Russia. Failed in his mission, he returned to the Trans-Siberian Railway shortly before Russia was invaded. Ciano's diary of 10 March 1942 mentions German pessimism about the war in Russia, and that Prince "Alberto von Urago" had visited Rome, making "bitter-sweet" comments about Japan, and hinting at the need for an Axis peace with Britain. "Urach also said that the liquidation of Russia still appears to be a very hard task". 11 March: "The Duce was indignant about Urach's declarations".

Seen in Berlin as an expert on East Asia, he spent much of 1939–43 writing about Japan's rapid technological advancements since the mid 19th century. The 1943 booklet "The secret of Japan's strength" is his best known, selling 800,000 copies, and is of particular interest insofar as someone with a partial dislike for Japan should glorify its martial spirit. Anxious to leave Germany, which was now facing defeat, in early 1944 he succeeded in being appointed press attaché at the German Embassy in Bern, with the rank of Unterkonsul. His children Manuela and Peter were born in Bern. Here he is said to have assisted a group smuggling capital out of Switzerland to the USA via "Banque Charles" in Monaco, where his second cousin Louis II reigned. However, the Swiss Kriminalpolizei files reveal that they had him under surveillance in 1944–45, and found after several months that he was not the well-connected clandestine financier that they had been led to believe.

In May 1945, as the Embassy no longer represented a state, all the German Embassy staff was expelled to the French-controlled part of Germany, and he was interned for questioning until 1946. He was interviewed twice in October 1945 by OSS officers, who concluded that: "He has been cooperative, and his information is considered reliable. He is not an automatic internee and is of no further CI interest". The OSS wartime chief in Bern had been Allen Dulles.

== Later life ==
In 1946–1948 von Urach was charged by a German court for creating and broadcasting propaganda in the National-Socialist style, and for membership of the Nazi party (see Denazification). He apologized and there was no sanction. His superiors were prosecuted in the Ministries Trial in 1948. In 1947–1967 he resumed his career as an artist and freelance journalist.

He was appointed chief press attaché at Mercedes-Benz in Stuttgart, Baden-Württemberg, West Germany, in 1953–1967, where his elder brother Wilhelm was a director. This suited his ability in languages and he travelled widely. He is jointly credited with encouraging the design of the Mercedes-Benz 300 SL. He then suffered a stroke in 1967 and was buried at Waldenburg in 1969.

== Family ==
In July 1931 in Oslo he married Rosemary Blackadder (1901–1975), a Scottish journalist and artist, daughter of John Blackadder and wife Anna Wilson, and this morganatic marriage made him ineligible to be Duke (Herzog) of Urach. They had a daughter Marie-Gabrielle, a.k.a. "Mariga", who married Desmond Guinness. Rosemary returned alone to Britain in 1938.

In 1943 he remarried to Ute Waldschmidt (1922–1984), daughter of Arnold Waldschmidt and his wife Olga Schwarz, and they had two children, Peter (1944–1977), and Manuela (1945–2017) who later married Sergei von Cube. They divorced in 1960.

== Ancestry ==
Ancestors of Albrecht von Urach

16. Frederick II Eugene, Duke of Württemberg
8. Duke Wilhelm of Württemberg
17. Friederike Dorothea of Brandenburg-Schwedt
4. Wilhelm, 1st Duke of Urach
18. Karl-August Rhodis, Baron of Thunderfeldt
9. Baroness Wilhelmine of Tunderfeldt-Rhodis
19. Therese, Baroness of Canstatt
2. Wilhelm Karl, 2nd Duke of Urach
20. Honoré IV, Prince of Monaco
10. Florestan I, Prince of Monaco
21. Louise d'Aumont Mazarin
5. Princess Florestine of Monaco
22. Charles-Thomas Gibert de Lametz
11. Maria Caroline Gibert de Lametz
23. Marie-Françoise Le Gras de Vaubercey
1. Prince Albrecht of Urach
24. Duke Pius August in Bavaria
12. Duke Maximilian Joseph in Bavaria
25. Princess Amélie Louise of Arenberg
6. Duke Karl-Theodor in Bavaria
26. Maximilian I Joseph of Bavaria
13. Princess Ludovika of Bavaria
27. Caroline of Baden
3. Duchess Amalie in Bavaria
28. Maximilian, Crown Prince of Saxony
14. John of Saxony
29. Princess Caroline of Parma
7. Princess Sophie of Saxony
30. Maximilian I Joseph of Bavaria (= 26)
15. Amalie Auguste of Bavaria
31. Caroline of Baden (= 27)

== Bibliography ==
German National Library (DNB) author ref. http://d-nb.info/gnd/126970335

- Ostasien: Kampf um das kommende Grossreich (Steiniger, Berlin, 1940)
  - Det Gula livsrummet. Malmö, 1941. (Swedish edition of the above book)
- Das Geheimnis japanischer Kraft (Berlin, Zentralverlag der NSDAP, 1943); see link
- Japans schöpferische Aussenpolitik (1944).
