= William of Urach =

William of Urach may refer to:

- Wilhelm, Duke of Urach (Stuttgart, 1810 – Schloss Lichtenstein, 1869)
- Mindaugas II of Lithuania (Monaco, 1864 - Italy, 1928)
- Prince Wilhelm of Urach (27 September 1897 – 8 August 1957)
