= Princess Maximiliana of Bavaria =

Bavarian Princess

Maximiliana
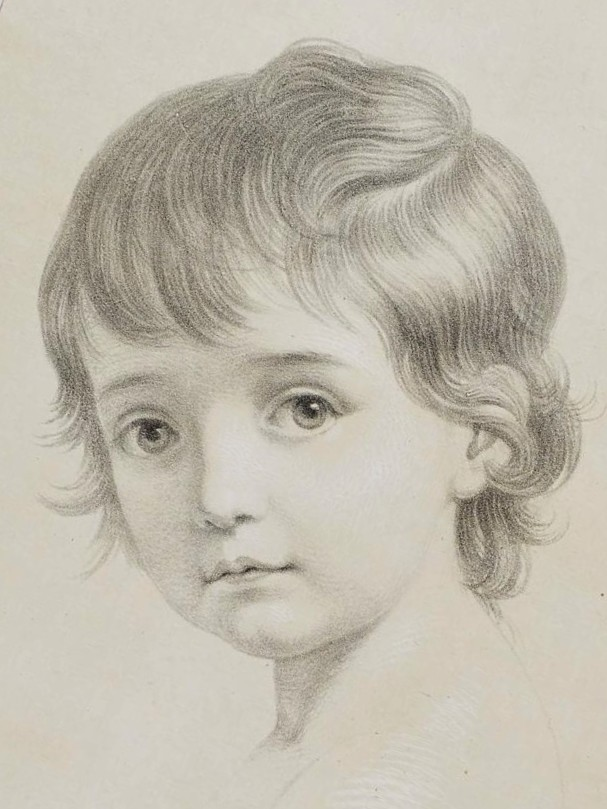
- Lithography by Joseph Karl Stieler, c. 1816
- Born: 21 July 1810; Nymphenburg Palace
- Died: 4 February 1821 (aged 10); Munich
- Burial: Theatine Church, Munich
Names
- Maximiliana Josepha Caroline
- House: Wittelsbach
- Father: Maximilian I Joseph of Bavaria
- Mother: Caroline of Baden

Princess Maximiliana Josepha Caroline of Bavaria (German: Maximiliane Josepha Karoline von Bayern, 21 July 1810 – 4 February 1821), was a Princess of Bavaria, daughter of King Maximilian I Joseph of Bavaria and Queen Caroline of Baden.

== Biography ==
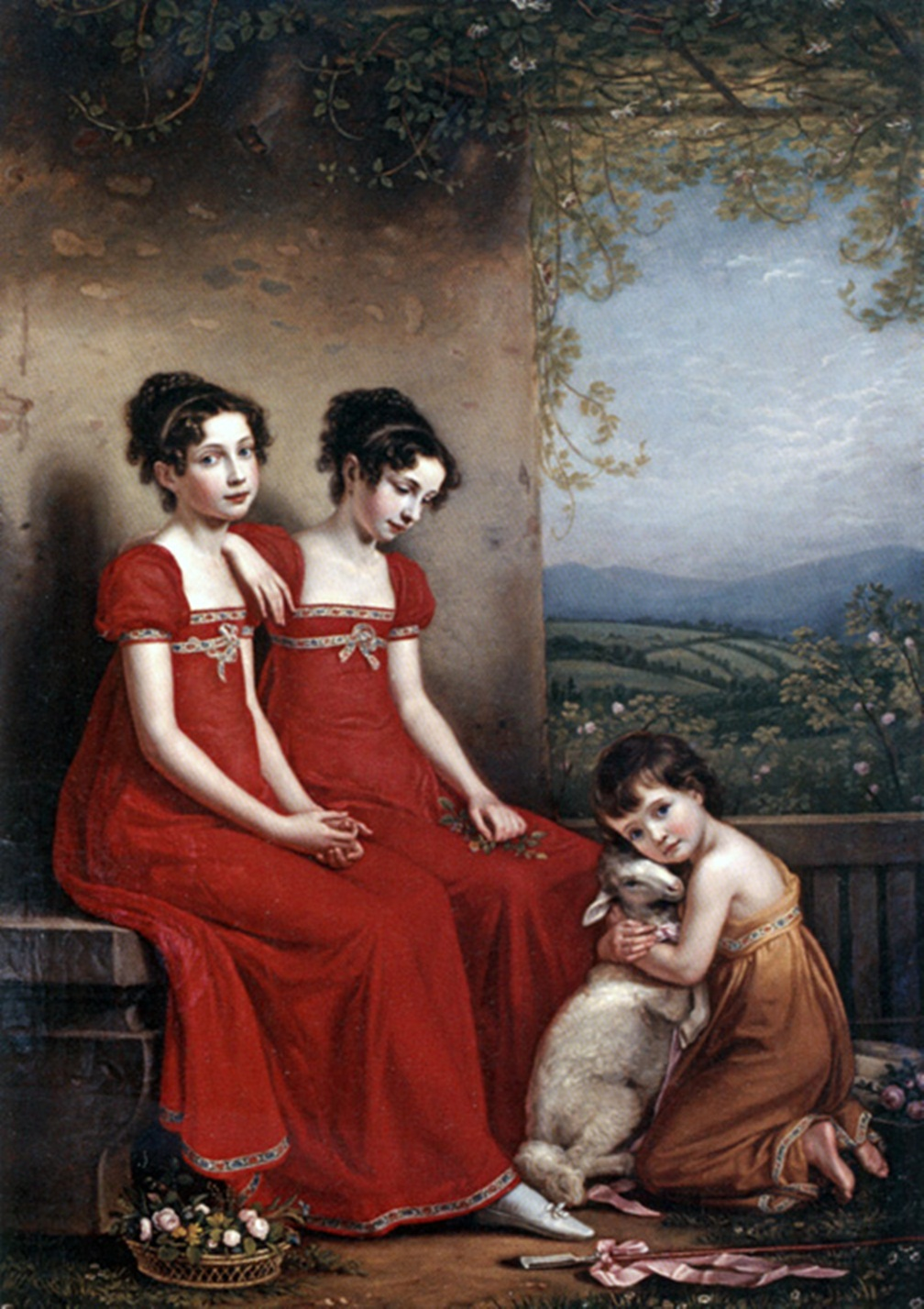
Full painting of Princess Maximiliana (embracing a lamb) with two of her sisters, Princesses Elisabeth and Amalie, Joseph Karl Stieler, 1814.

Maximiliana was born in Nymphenburg Palace, the summer residence of the kings of Bavaria. She was the last child of Maximilian I Joseph of Bavaria and his second wife, Caroline of Baden. Her mother gave birth to eight children; her eldest brother, Maximilian, died in childhood. Maximiliana's siblings included King Ludwig I, Caroline Augusta, Empress of Austria, Elisabeth, Queen consort of Prussia, Amalie, Queen consort of Saxony and Sophie, Archduchess of Austria; as well as Ludovika, Duchess in Bavaria, mother of the consort of Franz Joseph I of Austria, Empress Elisabeth of Austria (Sissi).

In 1821, Maximiliana fell ill with typhus, and died at the age of ten. Her death was a devastating blow to her mother. She was buried at the Theatine Church, Munich.

== Paintings ==
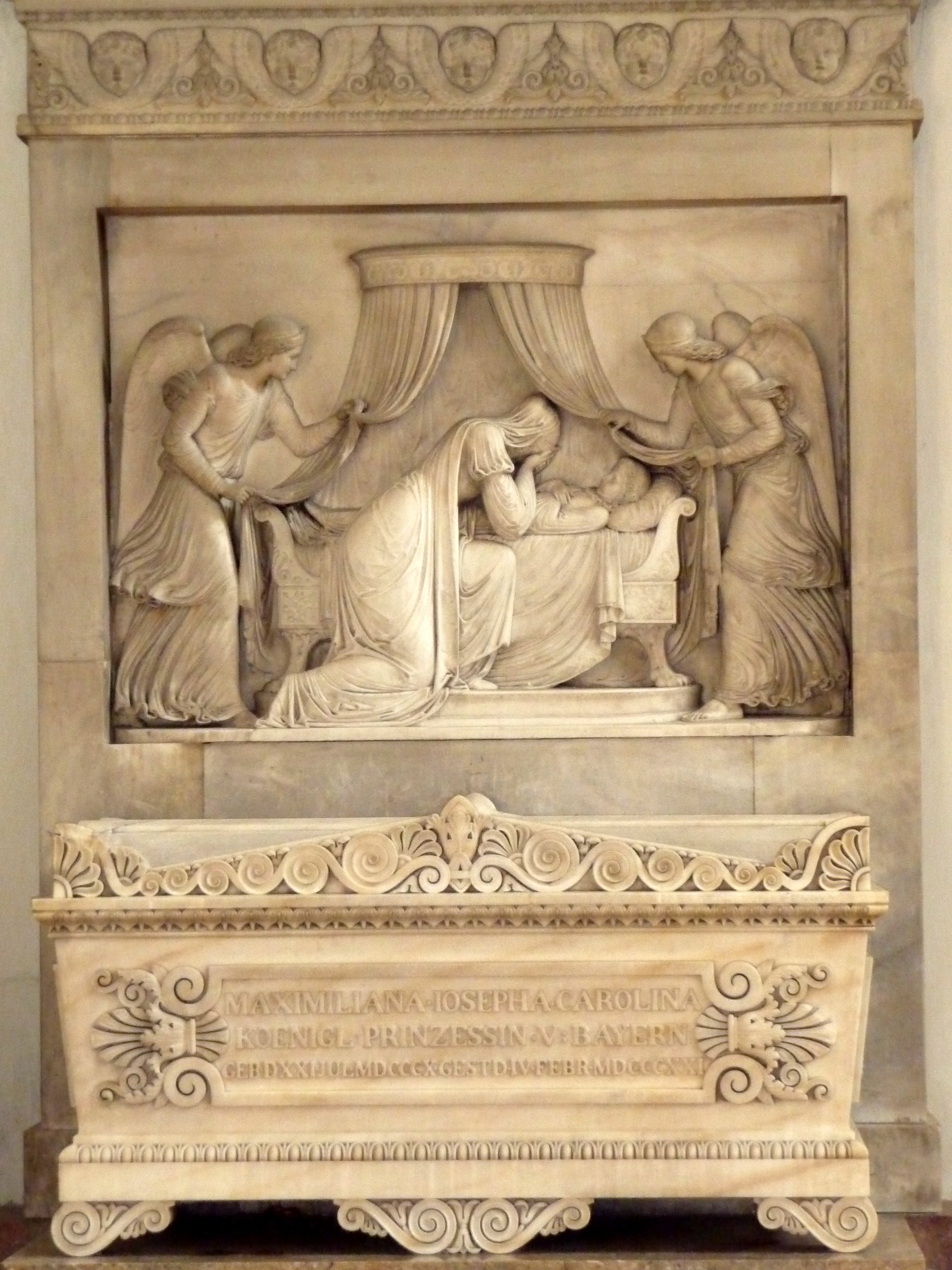
Tomb of Maximiliana at the Theatine Church, Munich.

In 1814, Maximiliana was immortalized by the painter Joseph Karl Stieler in an oil painting which appears embracing a lamb with her twin sisters Elisabeth and Amalie. After her death, her mother ordered more paintings to Joseph Stieler. Stieler painted her on her deathbed, and also made a full-length portrait of the princess.

== Ancestry ==
Ancestors of Princess Maximiliana of Bavaria

8. Christian III, Count Palatine of Zweibrücken
4. Frederick Michael, Count Palatine of Zweibrücken
9. Countess Caroline of Nassau-Saarbrücken
2. Maximilian I Joseph of Bavaria
10. Joseph Charles, Hereditary Prince of Sulzbach
5. Countess Palatine Maria Franziska of Sulzbach
11. Countess Palatine Elisabeth Auguste Sofie of Neuburg
1. Princess Maximiliana of Bavaria
12. Charles Frederick, Grand Duke of Baden
6. Charles Louis, Hereditary Prince of Baden
13. Landgravine Caroline Louise of Hesse-Darmstadt
3. Princess Caroline of Baden
14. Louis IX, Landgrave of Hesse-Darmstadt
7. Princess Amalie of Hesse-Darmstadt
15. Countess Palatine Caroline of Zweibrücken

== Literature ==
- Hans Rall; Marga Rall (1994), Die Wittelsbacher. Von Otto I. bis Elisabeth I (in German), Wien: Tosa
- Hans Rall (1979), Wittelsbacher Lebensbilder von Kaiser Ludwig bis zur Gegenwart. Führer durch die Münchner Fürstengrüfte mit Verzeichnis aller Wittelsbacher Grablegen und Grabstätten (in German), München
- Dorothea Minkels (2007), Elisabeth von Preussen. Königin in der Zeit des AusMÄRZens (in German), Norderstedt: Books on Demand GmbH, ISBN 978-3-8370-1250-7
