= Karl Gero, Duke of Urach =

Karl Gero
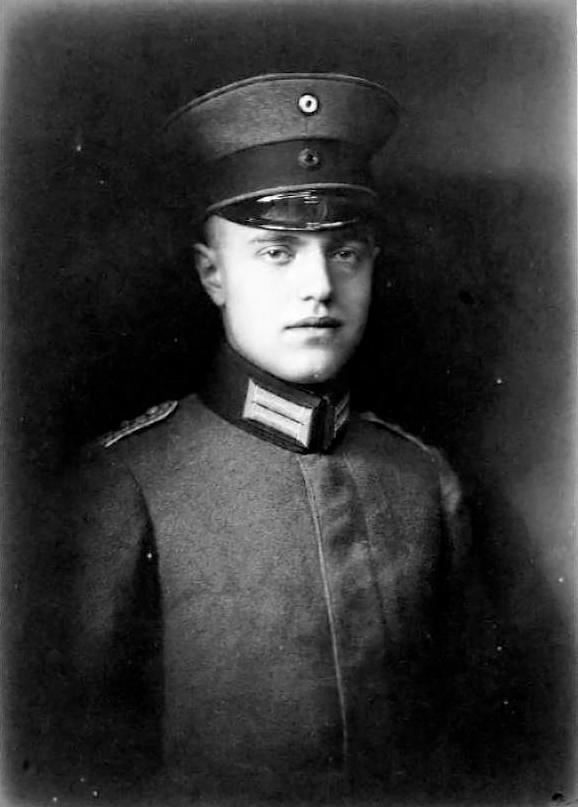
- Karl Gero in 1918

Duke of Urach
- Reign: 24 March 1928 – 15 August 1981
- Predecessor: Wilhelm
- Successor: Karl Anselm
- Born: 19 August 1899; Lichtenstein Castle, Lichtenstein, Reutlingen, Württemberg, Germany
- Died: 15 August 1981 (aged 81); Lichtenstein Castle, Lichtenstein, Reutlingen, Baden-Württemberg, West Germany
- Spouse: Countess Gabriele of Waldburg zu Zeil und Trauchburg (m. 1940)
- Father: Wilhelm Karl, Duke of Urach
- Mother: Duchess Amalie in Bavaria

Prince Karl Gero Albrecht Joseph Wilhelm Anton Maria of Urach, Count of Württemberg, 3rd Duke of Urach (19 August 1899 – 15 August 1981) was the head of the morganatic Urach branch of the House of Württemberg.

== Life ==
He was born in Lichtenstein, then part of the Kingdom of Württemberg, at his family's Lichtenstein Castle, being the second son of Duke Wilhelm of Urach and his first wife Duchess Amalie in Bavaria.

In 1917 he graduated from the Karls-Gymnasium school in Stuttgart. After graduation he served in the First World War as a lieutenant. He was heavily wounded in 1918. After the war Karl Gero von Urach studied architecture, and later worked as an architect in Munich.

In 1928, on his father's death, Karl Gero became the third Duke (Herzog) of Urach, as his elder brother Wilhelm had resolved to marry morganatically (he was a director at Mercedes-Benz for most of his life, and had two daughters).

In 1935 he entered Wehrmacht and became a Hauptmann, and in 1940 was promoted to major. Until 1945 he was based at the local army headquarters at Tübingen and Ulm.

On 20 June 1940 Karl Gero von Urach married Countess Gabriele of Waldburg zu Zeil und Trauchburg (1910–2005). The marriage was childless. Karl Gero von Urach died at Lichtenstein Castle on 15 August 1981, and his nephew Karl Anselm succeeded to the Dukedom.

== Ancestry ==
Ancestors of Karl Gero, Duke of Urach

8. Duke Wilhelm of Württemberg
4. Wilhelm, 1st Duke of Urach
9. Baroness Wilhelmine von Tunderfeld-Rhodis
2. Wilhelm Karl, 2nd Duke of Urach
10. Florestan, Prince of Monaco
5. Princess Florestine of Monaco
11. Maria Caroline Gibert de Lametz
1. Karl Gero, 3rd Duke of Urach
12. Duke Maximilian Joseph in Bavaria
6. Duke Karl Theodor in Bavaria
13. Princess Ludovika of Bavaria
3. Duchess Amalie in Bavaria
14. John of Saxony
7. Princess Sophie of Saxony
15. Princess Amalie Auguste of Bavaria

Karl Gero, 3rd Duke of Urach House of Württemberg Born: 19 August 1899 Died: 15 August 1981
Titles in pretence
Preceded by Wilhelm Karl, 2nd Duke of Urach	— TITULAR — King of Lithuania; 24 March 1928 – 15 August 1981	Succeeded by Karl Anselm, 4th Duke of Urach
Preceded by Wilhelm Karl, 2nd Duke of Urach	— TITULAR — Duke of Urach; 24 March 1928 – 15 August 1981	Succeeded by Karl Anselm, 4th Duke of Urach
