= Princess Sophie of Saxony =

- Duchess Karl Theodor in Bavaria
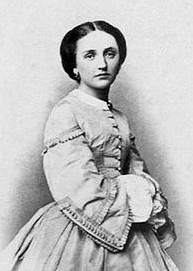
- Sophie in the 1860s
- Born: 15 March 1845; Dresden, Kingdom of Saxony
- Died: 9 March 1867 (aged 21); Munich, Kingdom of Bavaria
- Burial: Tegernsee Abbey
- Spouse: Duke Karl Theodor in Bavaria (m. 1865)
- Issue: Amalie, Duchess of Urach
Names
- German: Sophie Maria Friederike Augusta Leopoldina Alexandrine Ernestina Albertina Elisabeth
- House: Wettin
- Father: John of Saxony
- Mother: Amalie Auguste of Bavaria

Princess Sophie Mary Frederica Augusta Leopoldina Alexandrina Ernestina Albertina Elizabeth of Saxony, Princess of Saxony (Full German name: Prinzessin Sophie Maria Friederike Augusta Leopoldina Alexandrina Ernestina Albertina Elisabeth von Sachsen, Herzogin zu Sachsen) (15 March 1845, Dresden, Kingdom of Saxony – 9 March 1867, Munich, Kingdom of Bavaria) was the eighth and youngest child of John of Saxony and Amalie Auguste of Bavaria and the younger sister of Albert of Saxony and George of Saxony. Through her marriage to Duke Karl Theodor in Bavaria, Sophie was a member of the House of Wittelsbach and a Duchess in Bavaria.

== Marriage and issue ==
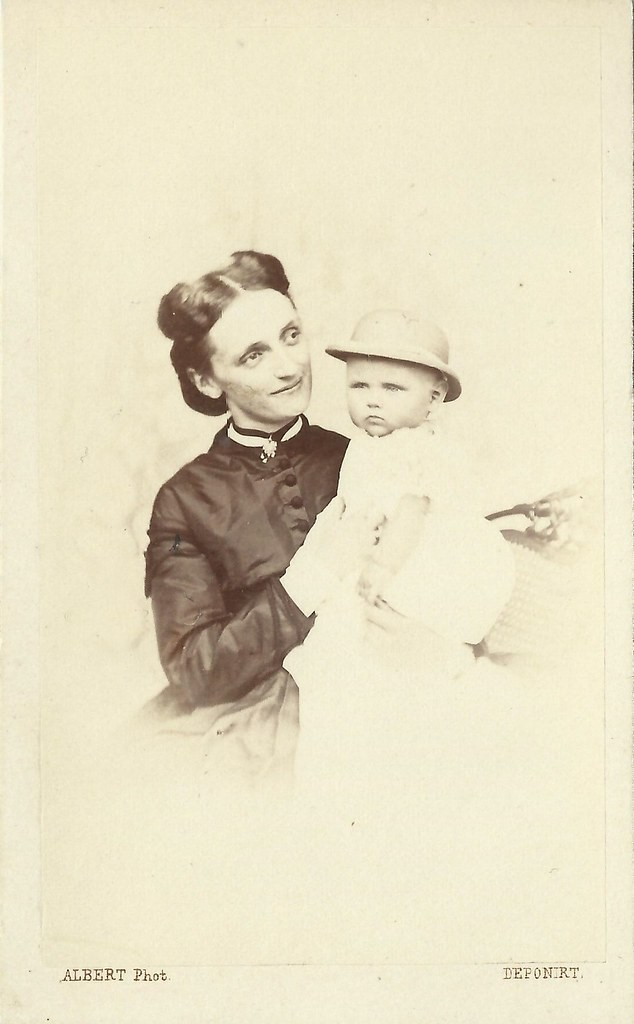
Duchess Sophie in Bavaria with her daughter Amalie, 1866/67

Sophie married her first cousin Duke Karl-Theodor in Bavaria, fifth child and third-eldest son of Duke Maximilian Joseph in Bavaria and his wife Princess Ludovika of Bavaria, on 11 February 1865 in Dresden. Sophie and Karl-Theodor had one child:

- Duchess Amalie in Bavaria (24 December 1865 – 26 May 1912)

== Illness and death ==
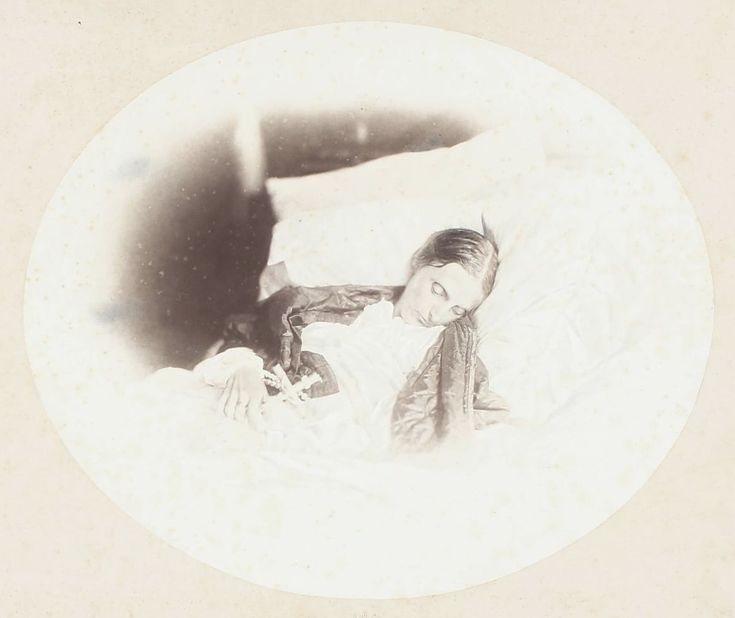
Sophie on her deathbed

Childbirth caused severe respiratory problems for Sophie, which progressively weakened her, although she managed to recover. However, a year later she contracted a severe case of influenza that she could not overcome. Sophie died shortly before her 22nd birthday on 9 March 1867 and was interred at Tegernsee Abbey.

== Ancestry ==
Ancestors of Princess Sophie of Saxony

8. Frederick Christian, Elector of Saxony
4. Maximilian, Hereditary Prince of Saxony
9. Duchess Maria Antonia of Bavaria
2. John of Saxony
10. Ferdinand, Duke of Parma
5. Princess Carolina of Parma
11. Archduchess Maria Amalia of Austria
1. Princess Sophie of Saxony
12. Frederick Michael, Count Palatine of Zweibrücken
6. Maximilian I Joseph of Bavaria
13. Countess Palatine Maria Franziska of Sulzbach
3. Princess Amalie Auguste of Bavaria
14. Charles Louis, Hereditary Prince of Baden
7. Princess Caroline of Baden
15. Princess Amalie of Hesse-Darmstadt
