= Maria Anna of Bavaria, Queen of Saxony =

Queen of Saxony from 1836 to 1854

Maria Anna of Bavaria
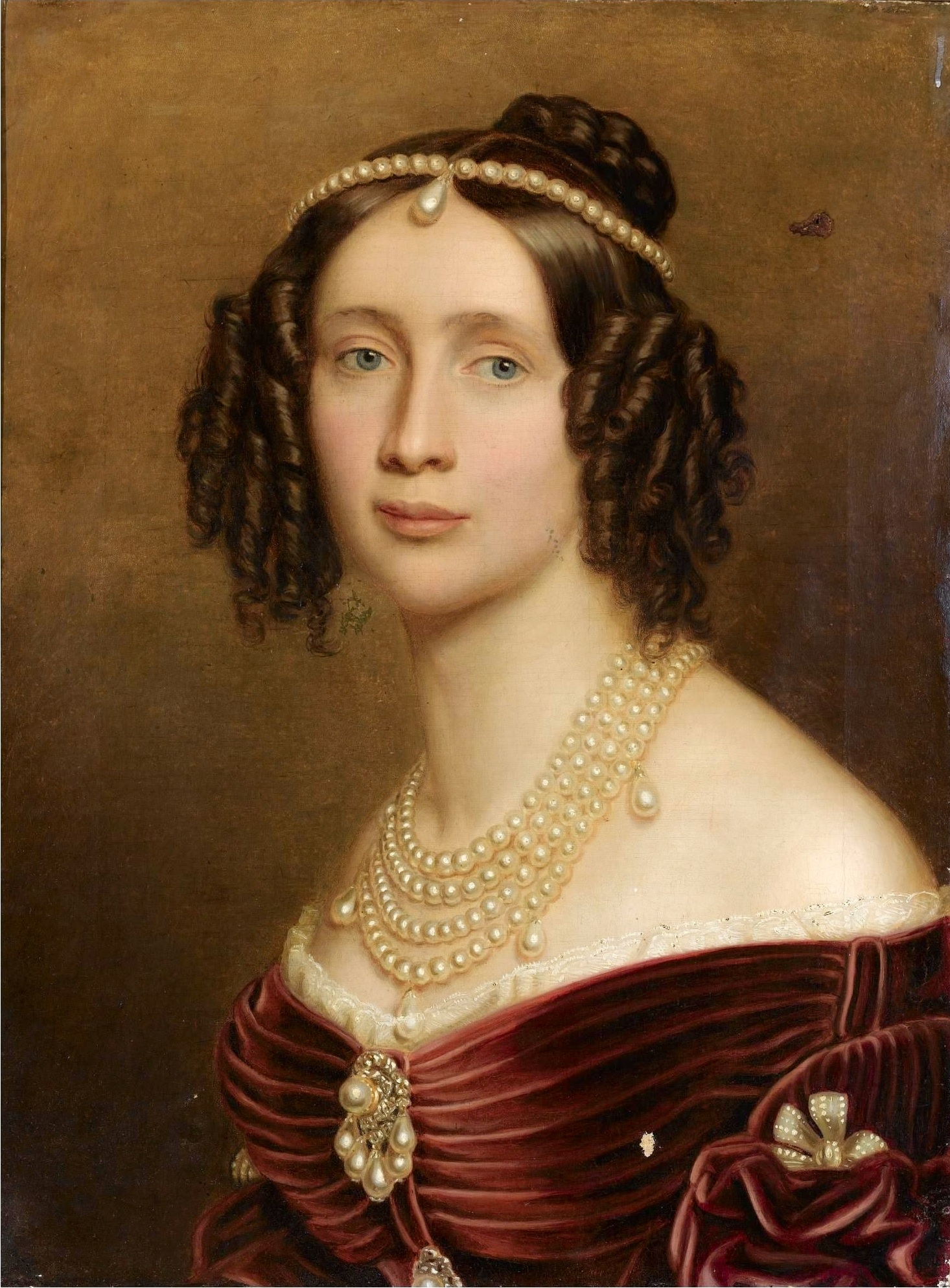
- Portrait, circa 1842.

Queen consort of Saxony
- Tenure: 6 June 1836 – 9 August 1854
- Born: 27 January 1805; Munich
- Died: 13 September 1877 (aged 72); Wachwitz, Dresden
- Burial: Katholische Hofkirche
- Spouse: Frederick Augustus II of Saxony (m. 1833; died 1854)
Names
- Maria Anna Leopoldine Elisabeth Wilhelmine
- House: Wittelsbach
- Father: Maximilian I Joseph of Bavaria
- Mother: Caroline of Baden

Princess Maria Anna of Bavaria (German: Maria Anna Leopoldine Elisabeth Wilhelmine von Bayern; 27 January 1805 – 13 September 1877), known as 'Marie' was Queen of Saxony from 1836 to 1854 as the second wife of King Frederick Augustus II of Saxony.

== Biography ==
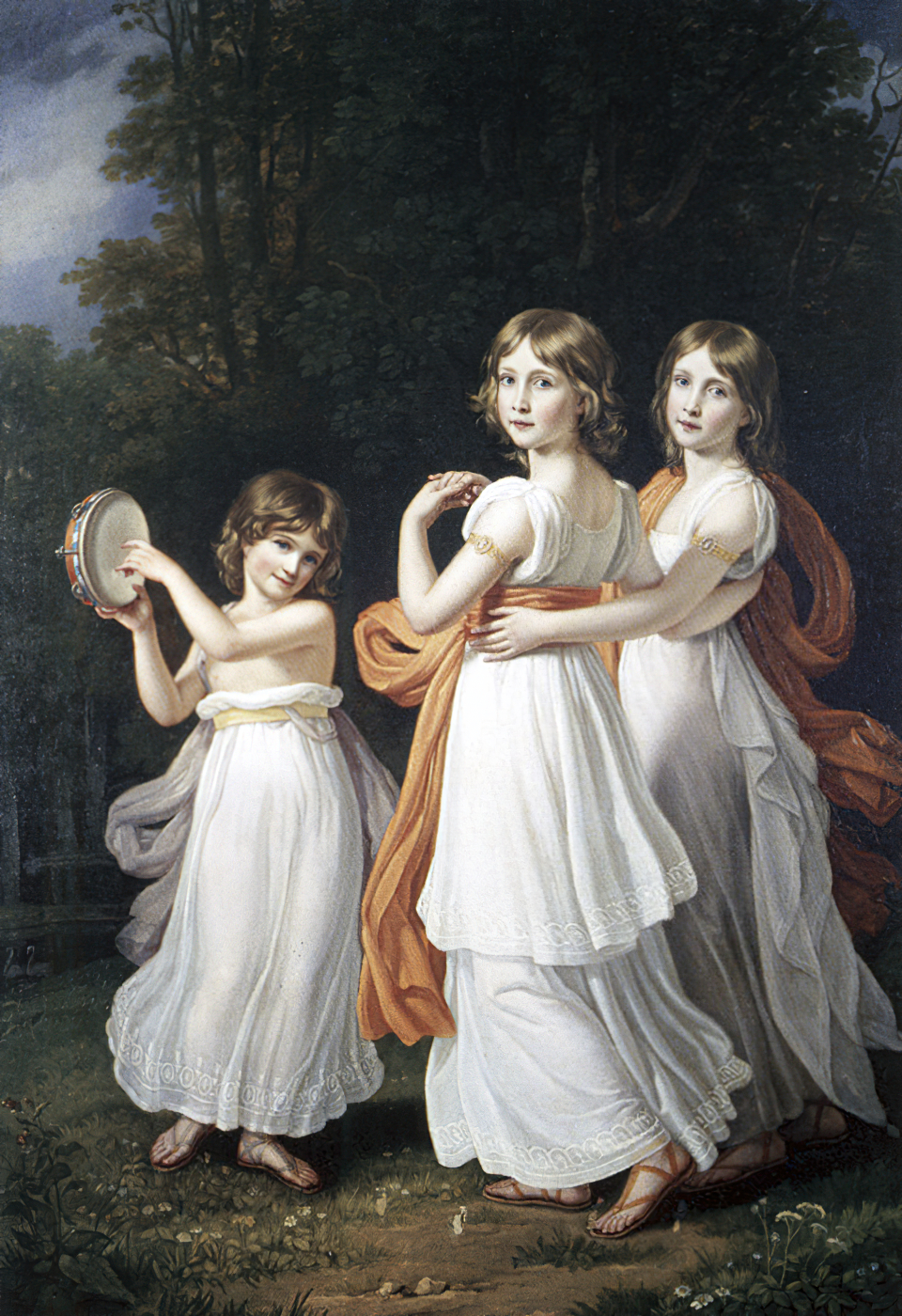
A painting of Maria Anna with two of her sisters: Princesses Sophie and Ludovika.

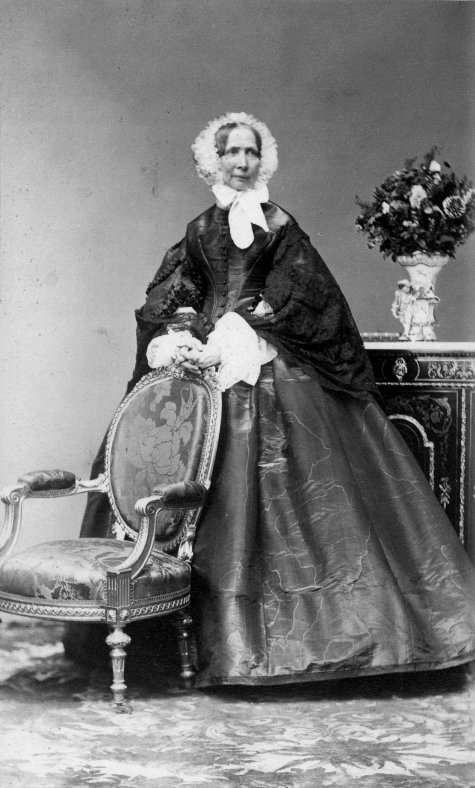
Maria Anna in old age

Maria Anna was born in Munich, the daughter of Maximilian I Joseph of Bavaria and his second wife, Karoline of Baden. She was the identical twin sister of Princess Sophie of Bavaria, mother of Emperor Franz Joseph I of Austria and Emperor Maximilian I of Mexico. She and her sister were their parent's second set of twins. Their younger sister, Ludovika, was mother of Empress Elisabeth of Austria and Queen Maria Sophie of the Two Sicillies.

=== Marriage ===
On 24 April 1833 in Dresden, Maria married Frederick, Crown Prince of Saxony, whose brother Prince John of Saxony was married to her sister Amalie. In 1836, Frederick succeeded his uncle Anthony as king, making her queen. There were no children from the marriage. Her husband, King Frederick Augustus II, died in 1854.

In 1836, during the great famine of Erzgebirge and Vogtland in Saxony, Maria Anna organized the first women committees to help, "Frauenvereinsanstalt der obererzgebirgischen und vogtländischen Frauenvereine" — this was in 1859 renamed "Zentralausschuß der obererzgebirgischen und vogtländischen Frauenvereine" and existed until 1932. She constructed the chapel Gedächtniskapelle in 1855. She is known as the correspondent of the writer Ida von Hahn-Hahn (1805–1880).

Maria Anna died in Wachwitz, Dresden, aged 72.

== Ancestry ==
Ancestors of Maria Anna of Bavaria, Queen of Saxony

8. Christian III, Count Palatine of Zweibrücken
4. Frederick Michael, Count Palatine of Zweibrücken
9. Countess Caroline of Nassau-Saarbrücken
2. Maximilian I Joseph of Bavaria
10. Joseph Charles, Hereditary Prince of Sulzbach
5. Countess Palatine Maria Franziska of Sulzbach
11. Countess Palatine Elisabeth Auguste Sofie of Neuburg
1. Maria Anna of Bavaria
12. Charles Frederick, Grand Duke of Baden
6. Charles Louis, Hereditary Prince of Baden
13. Princess Caroline Louise of Hesse-Darmstadt
3. Princess Caroline of Baden
14. Louis IX, Landgrave of Hesse-Darmstadt
7. Princess Amalie of Hesse-Darmstadt
15. Countess Palatine Caroline of Zweibrücken

== Literature ==
- Martha Schad: Bayerns Königinnen. Piper, 2005

== Footnotes ==
Maria Anna of Bavaria, Queen of Saxony Palatinate-Zweibrücken-Birkenfeld Cadet branch of the House of Wittelsbach Born: 27 January 1805 Died: 13 September 1877
German royalty
Vacant Title last held by Maria Theresa of Austria	Queen consort of Saxony; 6 June 1836 – 9 August 1854	Succeeded by Amalie Auguste of Bavaria
