= Elisabeth Ludovika of Bavaria =

Queen of Prussia from 1840 to 1861

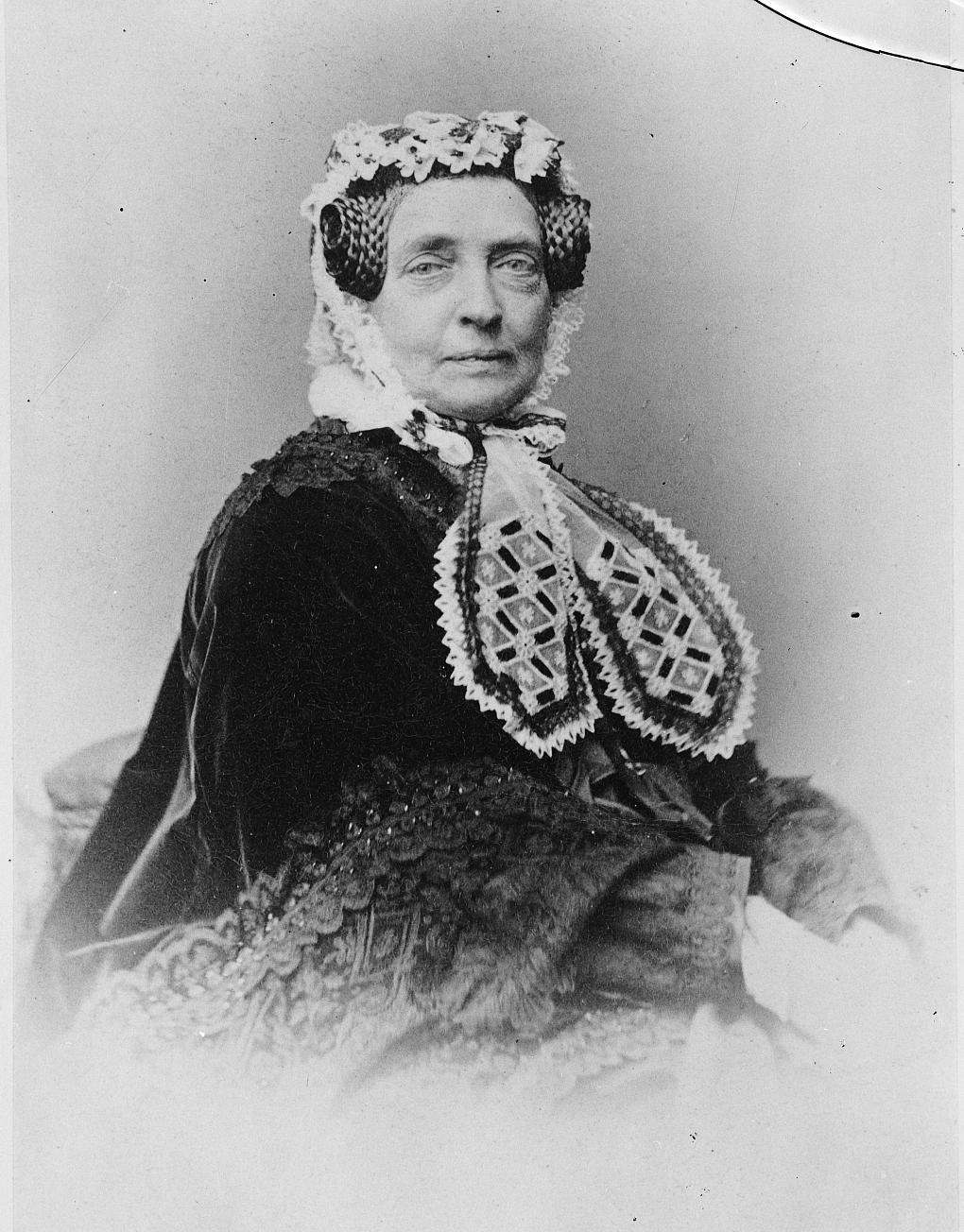
- Elisabeth Ludovika in 1861

Queen consort of Prussia
- Tenure: 7 June 1840 – 2 January 1861
- Born: 13 November 1801; Munich, Electorate of Bavaria, Holy Roman Empire
- Died: 14 December 1873 (aged 72); Dresden, Kingdom of Saxony, German Empire
- Burial: Crypt of the Church of Peace, Potsdam
- Spouse: Frederick William IV of Prussia (m. 1823; died 1861)
- House: Wittelsbach
- Father: Maximilian I Joseph of Bavaria
- Mother: Caroline of Baden

Elisabeth Ludovika of Bavaria (13 November 1801 – 14 December 1873) was queen of Prussia as the wife of King Frederick William IV. By birth, she was a Bavarian princess from the House of Wittelsbach; she was related to the ruling houses of Austria and Saxony through the marriages of her sisters. She supported her husband's interests in art and made charitable donations.

== Biography ==
=== Early life ===
Elisabeth was born in Munich, the daughter of King Maximilian I Joseph of Bavaria and his wife, Caroline of Baden. She was the identical twin sister of Queen Amalie of Saxony, consort of King John of Saxony, and sister of Archduchess Sophie of Austria, mother of Emperor Franz Joseph I of Austria and Emperor Maximilian I of Mexico; as well as Ludovika, Duchess in Bavaria, mother of Franz Josef's consort, Empress Elisabeth of Austria (Sisi), who was Elisabeth Ludovika's godchild and namesake. She was known within her family as Elise.

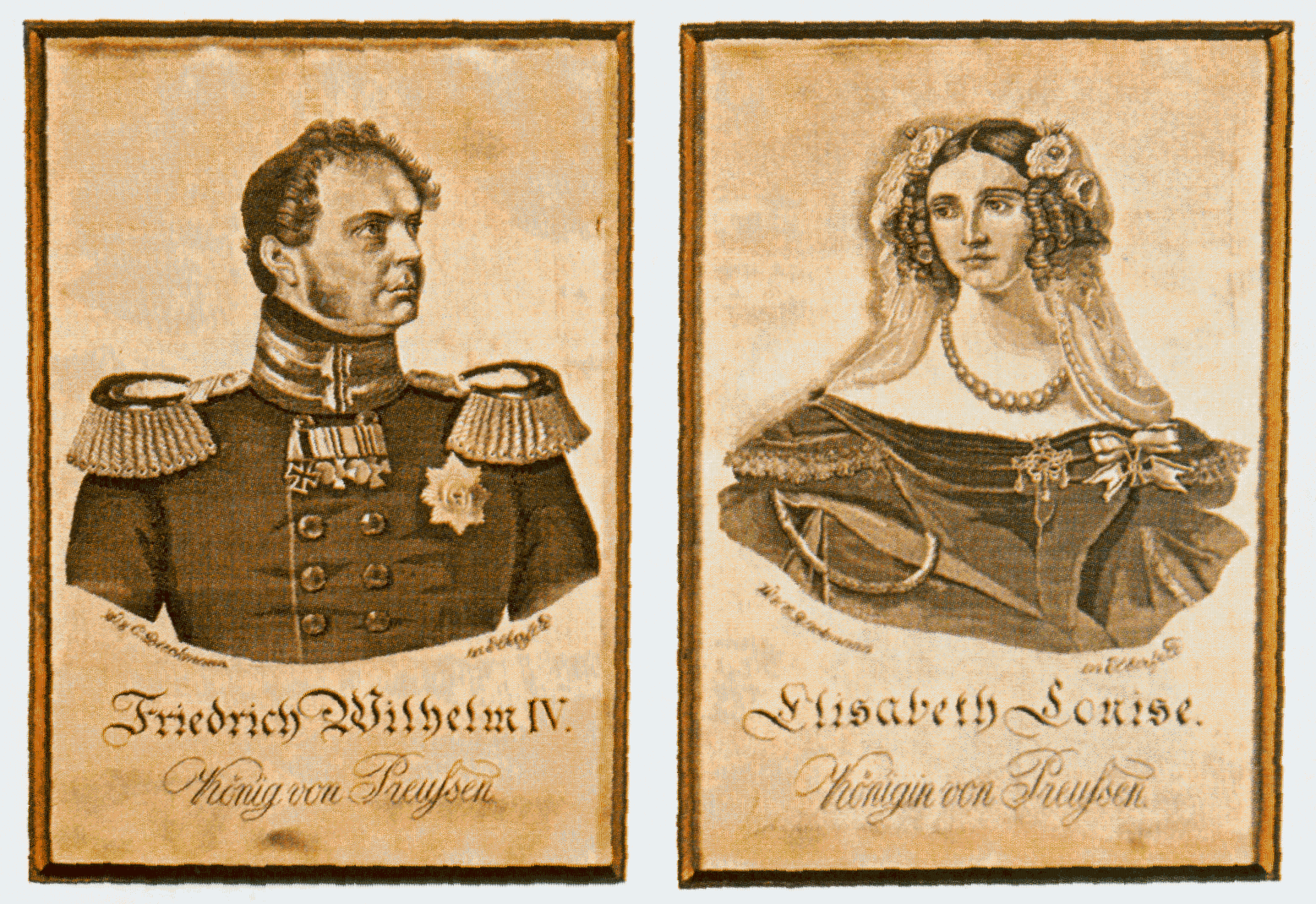
Silk pictures with the portraits of Frederick William IV and his consort Elisabeth. The board frame bears the legend: "The first pictures woven in silk / made in the year 1847 in the silk weaving factory of / Wilhelm and Carl Dieckmann in Elbersfeld / and presented by the manufacturer to King Frederick William IV / in a special audience."

=== Crown Princess ===
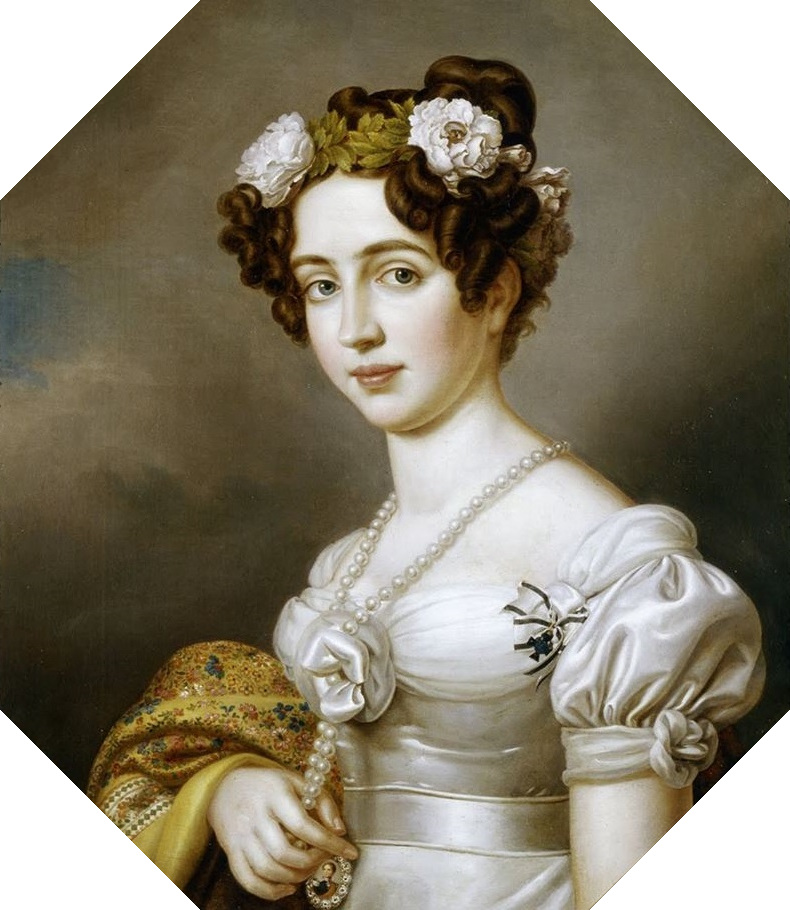
Portrait by Joseph Karl Stieler, c. 1823

On 29 November 1823, she married the future King Frederick William IV of Prussia and supported his intellectual interests, namely his attempts at artwork, which he held dear to his heart. She refused to become a Protestant as a condition of her marriage, to ascend the throne of Prussia next to the future king, insisting that she would only convert if she was convinced on the merits of the reformed faith after studying it for herself. It was on 5 May 1830, seven years after her marriage, that Elisabeth formally converted to Protestantism. Her union was reportedly happy, but remained childless: after a single miscarriage in 1828, Elisabeth was unable to have any offspring.

=== Queen ===
Becoming Queen consort of Prussia in 1840, she was never without influence in Prussian politics, where she was active in preserving the close friendship between Prussia and the Austrian Empire.

To Frederick William IV, she was an exemplary wife and, during his long illness, a dedicated nurse. She was initially hostile to her nephew's British wife, Victoria, Princess Royal, known within the family as Vicky, but their relationship thawed when Vicky took care of Elisabeth and comforted her during the early painful days of her widowhood. Elisabeth never forgot Vicky's kindness and in her will broke with tradition by leaving Vicky her jewels. According to tradition, these jewels were normally meant to have been bequeathed to the current Queen, (Augusta of Saxe-Weimar, Elisabeth's sister-in-law, who was by then Prussian Queen and German Empress); Augusta was insulted by this, and never forgave Vicky.

=== Queen Dowager ===
After her husband's death on 2 January 1861, Elisabeth lived quietly at her seats at Sanssouci, Charlottenburg, and Stolzenfels and dedicated herself to charity work in memory of her late husband. Her brother-in-law, William I, German Emperor, held her in high regard as a true friend.

In 1865, Elisabeth would cross paths with the future Field Marshal and President Paul von Hindenburg, who served as her page. For his service, she gifted the young man a pocket watch, a cherished possession he would carry with him for the rest of his life. According to von Hindenburg's memoirs, it served as his "companion" throughout his service in the Austro-Prussian War, the Franco-Prussian War, and World War I.

Elisabeth died in 1873 in Dresden during a visit to her sister, Queen Amalie of Saxony. She was buried next to her husband on 21 December at the Friedenskirche in Potsdam.

== Ancestry ==
Ancestors of Elisabeth Ludovika of Bavaria

8. Christian III, Count Palatine of Zweibrücken
4. Frederick Michael, Count Palatine of Zweibrücken
9. Countess Caroline of Nassau-Saarbrücken
2. Maximilian I Joseph of Bavaria
10. Joseph Charles, Hereditary Prince of Sulzbach
5. Countess Palatine Maria Franziska of Sulzbach
11. Countess Palatine Elisabeth Auguste Sofie of Neuburg
1. Elisabeth Ludovika of Bavaria
12. Charles Frederick, Grand Duke of Baden
6. Charles Louis, Hereditary Prince of Baden
13. Princess Caroline Louise of Hesse-Darmstadt
3. Princess Caroline of Baden
14. Louis IX, Landgrave of Hesse-Darmstadt
7. Princess Amalie of Hesse-Darmstadt
15. Countess Palatine Caroline of Zweibrücken

== Sources ==
- Moritz Freiherr von Bissing: Elisabeth Königin von Preußen, Berlin 1974.
- Ludovika Hesekiel: Elisabeth Luise, Königin von Preußen (Berlin 1881).
- Dorothea Minkels: "Porträts der preußischen Königin Elisabeth in der Sammlung des Stadtmuseums Berlin." in: Jahrbuch 2004/2005 Stadtmuseum Berlin, pg. 278–304.
- Alfred v. Reumont: Elisabeth, Königin von Preußen (Berlin 1874)
- Dorothea Minkels: Elisabeth von Preußen. Königin in der Zeit des AusMÄRZens. Norderstedt 2008.

Elisabeth Ludovika of Bavaria House of Wittelsbach Born: 13 November 1801 Died: 4 December 1873
Royal titles
Vacant Title last held by Louise of Mecklenburg-Strelitz	Queen consort of Prussia; 1840–1861	Succeeded by Augusta of Saxe-Weimar
Vacant Title last held by Maria Elisabeth Franziska of Bavaria	Princess of Neuchâtel; 1840–1857	Monarchy abolished Neuchâtel adopts Democracy
