= Wilhelm von Urach =

German mechanical engineer (1897–1957)

Prince Wilhelm of Urach
- Born: 27 September 1897; Stuttgart, Württemberg, Germany
- Died: 8 August 1957 (aged 59); Munich, Bavaria, West Germany
- Education: Catholic University of Leuven / Louvain
- Occupation: Automotive engineer
- Spouse: Elisabeth Theurer (m. 1928)
- Children: Elisabeth von Urach; Maria Christine von Urach
- Parent(s): Wilhelm Karl, 2nd Duke of Urach; Amalie, Duchess in Bavaria

Prince Wilhelm of Urach, Count of Württemberg (27 September 1897 – 8 August 1957) was a German prince and member of the House of Urach, a morganatic branch of the Royal House of the Kingdom of Württemberg), and a senior automotive production engineer.

== Life and career ==
Wilhelm Albert Karl Anton Paul Gero Maria, Fürst von Urach, Graf von Württemberg, was born in Stuttgart as the eldest son of Wilhelm Karl, 2nd Duke of Urach and his first wife, Amalie, Duchess in Bavaria. On leaving his Stuttgart preparatory school, he moved on, in 1908, to the Karls-Gymnasium, a secondary school, passing his Abitur (school leaving examination) in 1914.

As was customary for members of royal houses, Wilhelm then began military service, entering the 1st Württemberg Field Artillery Regiment No. 13 (Feldartillerie-Regiment „König Karl“ (1. Württembergisches) Nr. 13) in the summer of 1914. He was named a Leutnant in the regiment on 8 July 1914 and, with the beginning of the First World War soon thereafter, went into the field. His wartime career included periods of service in Field Artillery Regiment No. 13 and Reserve Field Artillery Regiment No. 26, and on the staffs of the 26th Infantry Brigade, the 25th Reserve Division and the IV Reserve Corps, seeing action in France, Poland, Flanders, Serbia, the Carpathians and Bukovina. On 30 August 1915, he was decorated with Württemberg's Military Merit Order. On 18 December 1917, he was promoted to Oberleutnant. He was separated from the army on 26 January 1920.

While the war was still underway, probably at the instigation of his father, he enrolled as a "war student" at the University of Tübingen to study law. However, his own interest was directed more towards engineering and technology. Between 1919 and 1922, Wilhelm studied mechanical engineering at the Technische Hochschule Stuttgart (now the University of Stuttgart), emerging with an engineering degree. As a student, he became a member of the student fraternity "Akademische Gesellschaft Sonderbund" in Stuttgart.

Following his graduation, he worked successively for Steiger in Burgrieden, Cockerell in Munich and Bugatti in Molsheim. In 1927, he switched to Daimler-Benz, working in Untertürkheim, a district of Stuttgart, as a design engineer. In 1933, he joined the top management team and in 1937, he was appointed a chief engineer. His responsibilities included taking care of the Mercedes drivers at sporting events.

During the Second World War, between 1941 and 1944, he was sent to France where he was mandated to take responsibility for the technical directorship of Renault, based in a northern suburb of Paris. During these years, he successfully avoided knowing about the covert development of the Renault 4CV, which after the end of the war in 1945 proved crucial to the survival of what became France's largest automobile manufacturer. In 1945 he returned to Daimler-Benz as a member of the top management team ("Direktions-Sekretariat"). Between 1946 and 1950, he was in charge of passenger car testing. In 1954, he received Procuration responsibility on behalf of the company, and this was also the year in which he took over the Mercedes-Benz Museum.

He died in Munich on 8 August 1957. He is buried in Stuttgart.

== Family ==
Wilhelm married Elisabeth Theurer (1899–1988) on 19 June 1928, despite opposition from his father. Elisabeth was the daughter of Richard Theurer, General Director of G. Siegle & Co., a long-established Stuttgart manufacturer of dyes and colourings, and his wife Elisabeth Groß. By the date of his marriage, Wilhelm's father had been dead for nearly three months, but the marriage was nonetheless deemed morganatic, and he was required to renounce his right to the title Duke of Urach, Count of Württemberg. Headship of the noble family instead passed to his younger brother, Karl Gero, Duke of Urach.

The marriage produced two recorded daughters, the elder of which, Elisabeth von Urach (1932–1999), obtained a doctorate in psychology and worked in a top job with Stuttgart's Education and Youth Counselling service. The younger daughter, Maria Christine von Urach (1933–1990), mirrored her father's career choice, with a successful 31-year career at Daimler-Benz, starting as an engineer and ending up in charge of Data Processing at Untertürkheim.

== Honors and awards ==
- Kingdom of Württemberg:
  - Order of the Württemberg Crown, Grand Cross
  - Golden Military Merit Medal (1 November 1914)
  - Military Merit Order, Knight's Cross, in lieu of the previously awarded Golden Military Merit Medal (30 August 1915)
  - Friedrich Order, Knight's Cross 2nd Class with Swords (20 February 1918)
  - Wilhelm Cross with Swords and Crown (5 October 1916)
- Kingdom of Prussia:
  - Iron Cross, 2nd Class
  - Iron Cross, 1st Class
- Kingdom of Bavaria: Military Merit Order, 4th Class with Swords
- Kingdom of Saxony: Albert Order, Knight's Cross 2nd Class with Swords
- Austria-Hungary: Military Merit Cross, 3rd Class with War Decoration
- Ottoman Empire:
  - Liakat Medal in Gold
  - War Medal

== See also ==
- Kingdom of Lithuania (1918)
