= Wilhelm Karl, Duke of Urach =

German prince, King-elect of Lithuania in 1918 (1864–1928)

Prince Wilhelm Karl Mindaugas II
- Wilhelm in 1909

Duke of Urach
- Reign: 17 July 1869 – 24 March 1928
- Predecessor: Prince Wilhelm
- Successor: Prince Karl Gero

King-elect of Lithuania
- Reign: 11 July – 2 November 1918
- Born: 3 March 1864; Monaco
- Died: 24 March 1928 (aged 64); Rapallo, Kingdom of Italy
- Burial: Ludwigsburg Palace Church
- Spouse: Duchess Amalie in Bavaria (m. 1892; died 1912) Princess Wiltrud of Bavaria (m. 1924)
- Issue Detail: Princess Marie-Gabriele; Princess Elisabeth of Urach; Princess Karola; Prince Wilhelm; Karl Gero, Duke of Urach; Princess Margarete; Albrecht von Urach; Prince Eberhard; Princess Mechtilde
Names
- Wilhelm Karl Florestan Gero Crescentius
- House: Urach
- Father: Wilhelm, 1st Duke of Urach
- Mother: Princess Florestine of Monaco
- Military service
- Allegiance: German Empire
- Branch: Imperial German Army
- Service years: 1883–1918
- Rank: General der Kavallerie
- Commands: 26th Division; 64th Corps
- Conflicts: World War I

Prince Wilhelm of Urach, Count of Württemberg, 2nd Duke of Urach (Wilhelm Karl Florestan Gero Crescentius; German: Fürst Wilhelm von Urach, Graf von Württemberg, 2. Herzog von Urach; 3 March 1864 – 24 March 1928), was a German prince who was elected in June 1918 as King of Lithuania, with the regnal name of Mindaugas II. He never assumed the crown, however, as German authorities declared the election invalid; the invitation was withdrawn in November 1918. From 17 July 1869 until his death, he was the head of the morganatic Urach branch of the House of Württemberg.

== Early life ==
Born as Wilhelm Karl Florestan Gero Crescentius, Count of Württemberg, he was the elder son of Wilhelm, 1st Duke of Urach (the head of a morganatic branch of the Royal House of the Kingdom of Württemberg), and his second wife, Princess Florestine of Monaco, occasional Regent of Monaco and daughter of Florestan I, Prince of Monaco.

At the age of four, Wilhelm succeeded his father as Duke of Urach. He was born and spent much of his childhood in Monaco, where his mother Florestine often managed the government during the extended oceanographic expeditions of her nephew, Prince Albert I. Wilhelm was culturally francophone.

== Candidate for various thrones ==
Through his mother, Wilhelm was a legitimate heir to the throne of Monaco. Wilhelm's cousin Prince Albert I of Monaco had only one child, Prince Louis, who was unmarried and had no legitimate children. The French Republic, however, was reluctant to see a German prince ruling Monaco. Under French pressure, Monaco passed a law in 1911 recognising Louis's illegitimate daughter, Charlotte, as heir; she was adopted in 1918 by her grandfather Prince Albert I as part of the Monaco Succession Crisis of 1918. Wilhelm was relegated to third in line to Monaco's throne, behind Louis and Charlotte. Furthermore, in July 1918 France and Monaco signed the Franco-Monegasque Treaty; it required all future princes of Monaco to be French or Monegasque citizens and secure the approval of the French government to succeed to the throne. After the accession of Prince Louis II in 1922, Wilhelm renounced his rights of succession to the throne of Monaco in favour of distant French cousins, the counts de Chabrillan, in 1924.

In 1913, Wilhelm was one of several princes considered for the throne of Albania. He was supported by Catholic groups in the north and attended the Albanian Congress of Trieste. In 1914, Prince William of Wied was selected instead.

In 1917, as a newly retired general, Wilhelm sounded out the possibility of being made Grand Duke of Alsace-Lorraine after the war was over. In 1918, he accepted the short-lived invitation to reign as Mindaugas II of Lithuania. His claims were published in a 2001 essay by his grandson-in-law, Sergei von Cube.

== Military career ==
As was typical of members of his family, Wilhelm entered the army in 1883 and served as a professional officer. By the outbreak of World War I, he was a Generalleutnant and commander of the 26th Infantry Division (1st Royal Württemberg) of the Imperial German Army. Until November 1914 this division was part of the German assault on France and Belgium, where Wilhelm's sister-in-law Elisabeth of Belgium was queen. In December 1914, the division fought in the battle to cross the Bzura river in Poland. From June to September 1915, the division moved from north of Warsaw to positions close to the Neman River, an advance of hundreds of miles in the campaign in which Poland was taken (the Great Russian Retreat of World War I). In October–November 1915, the division took part in the Serbian Campaign, moving from west of Belgrade to Kraljevo in less than a month. The division served at Ypres in Belgium from December 1915 to July 1916, then was largely destroyed at the Somme battles from August to November 1916 while holding the Schwaben Redoubt (Swabia is part of Württemberg).

On 30 December 1916, Wilhelm was named commanding general of the 64th Corps (Generalkommando 64) on the Western Front, taking command on 5 January 1917 and holding it until 10 December 1918 when the corps-level command was deactivated. He was promoted to General der Kavallerie on 25 February 1917. His aides de camp included Eugen Ott and Erwin Rommel.

== King of Lithuania ==
On 4 June 1918, the Council of Lithuania voted to invite Wilhelm to become the king of a newly independent Lithuania. Wilhelm agreed and was elected on 11 July 1918, taking the name Mindaugas II. His election can be explained by several factors:

- he was Roman Catholic (the dominant religion in Lithuania);
- he was not a member of the House of Hohenzollern, the family to which belonged the German Emperor William II, who wanted Lithuania to be a monarchy in personal union with Prussia;
- the Treaty of Brest-Litovsk of March 1918 had established Germany's power in the region, for the time being;
- he had had a successful military career;
- if the Central Powers were to win the war, Lithuania could have expected German protection in the event of future intrusions by Russia.
- He was descended from Casimir IV Jagiellon, grand duke of Lithuania in the 15th century, through his daughter Barbara Jagiellon.

According to Wilhelm's agreement with the Council of Lithuania, he had to live in Lithuania and learn to speak its language.

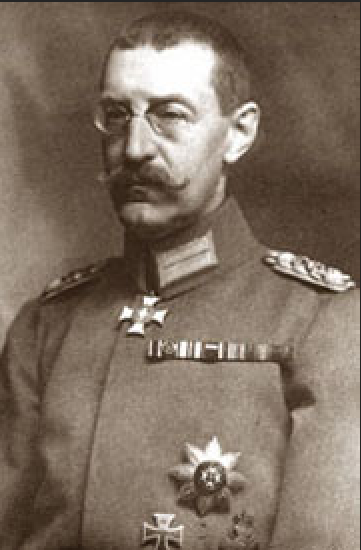
Portrait 1918

From the beginning, Wilhelm's reign was controversial. The four socialists of the twenty members of the Council of Lithuania left in protest. The German government did not recognize Wilhelm's selection as king, although the influential publicist and politician Matthias Erzberger, also a Catholic from Württemberg, supported the claim. Wilhelm never had the chance to visit Lithuania; he remained instead at Lichtenstein Castle, his home south of Stuttgart. He did start to learn the Lithuanian language, however. Within a few months of his election, it became clear that Germany would lose World War I, and on 2 November 1918, the Council of Lithuania reversed its decision.

In the tiny chapel of Lichtenstein Castle is a framed letter from Pope Benedict XV welcoming Wilhelm's selection as the future king of Lithuania.

In 2009, Wilhelm's grandson Inigo was interviewed on television in Vilnius, and said: "...if he was honoured with a proposal to assume the throne of Lithuania, he would not refuse it."

The German anti-war novelist Arnold Zweig set his 1937 novel Einsetzung eines Königs (The Crowning of a King) around the election of Mindaugas in 1918.

== Marriages and children ==
Wilhelm Karl and his family

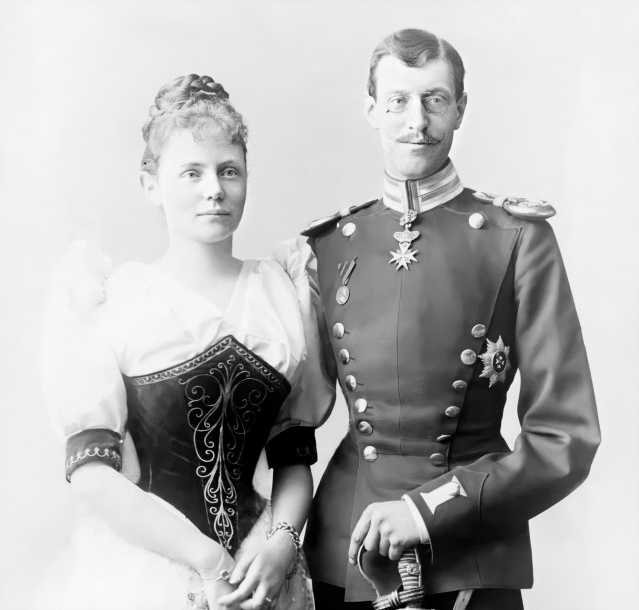
Marriage of the Duke of Urach

Wilhelm was married twice. On 4 July 1892, he married firstly Duchess Amalie in Bavaria (1865–1912), daughter of Karl-Theodor, Duke in Bavaria, a niece of Empress Elisabeth of Austria, and a direct descendant of the Lithuanian princess Ludwika Karolina Radziwiłł of Biržai. Nine children were born of this marriage:

- Princess Marie Gabriele (1893–1908)
- Princess Elizabeth (1894–1962) who married Prince Karl of Liechtenstein (1878–1955), an uncle of Franz Joseph II, Prince of Liechtenstein, and had issue.
- Princess Karola (1896–1980)
- Prince Wilhelm (1897–1957), who morganatically married Elisabeth Theurer (1899–1988) and had two daughters, Elisabeth and Marie Christine, neither of whom married.
- Karl Gero, Duke of Urach (1899–1981), 3rd Duke of Urach, who married Countess Gabriele of Waldburg-Zeil (1910–2005); no issue.
- Princess Margarete (1901–1975)
- Prince Albrecht (1903–1969), a diplomat; former artist turned journalist, and expert on the Far East. Married first Rosemary Blackadder and second Ute Waldschmidt, divorced both of them and had issue by both. His daughter Marie-Gabrielle (aka Mariga) was the first wife of Desmond Guinness. Albrecht's marriages were also considered morganatic, but his descendants use Furst von Urach as their surname.
- Prince Eberhard (1907–1969), who married Princess Iniga of Thurn and Taxis (1925–2008) and had issue: Karl Anselm, Duke of Urach, born 1955, Wilhelm Albert, Duke of Urach, born 1957 and Prince Inigo of Urach, born 1962.
- Princess Mechtilde (1912–2001), who married Friedrich Karl, Prince of Hohenlohe-Waldenburg-Schillingsfürst and had issue.

In 1924, Wilhelm married secondly Princess Wiltrud of Bavaria (1884–1975), daughter of King Ludwig III of Bavaria. This marriage was childless.

Prince Eberhard's son Inigo made a sentimental journey to Lithuania in November 2009, which was covered by the local media.

== Decorations and awards ==
=== German states ===
- Kingdom of Württemberg:
  - Military Merit Order
    - Knight's Cross (1914)
    - Commander's Cross (20 February 1918)
  - Order of the Württemberg Crown
    - Grand Cross
    - Swords to the Grand Cross (5 July 1915)
  - Friedrich Order
    - Grand Cross
    - Crown and Swords to the Grand Cross (5 September 1916)
  - Wilhelm Cross with Swords and Crown (5 October 1916)
  - Service Decoration 1st Class for Officers
  - Jubilee Medal in Gold
- Kingdom of Bavaria:
  - Order of St. Hubert, Knight (1892)
  - Military Merit Order, 2nd Class with Star and Swords (13 November 1914)
  - Military Merit Order, 1st Class with Swords (11 June 1917)
  - Military Merit Order, 1st Class with Crown and Swords (31 August 1918)
  - Prince Regent Luitpold Medal on the Ribbon of the Jubilee Medal for the Bavarian Army
- Free and Hanseatic City of Hamburg: Hanseatic Cross
- Grand Duchy of Hesse: General Honor Decoration for Bravery
- Princely House of Hohenzollern
  - Princely House Order of Hohenzollern, Cross of Honor 1st Class
  - Princely House Order of Hohenzollern, Swords to the Cross of Honor 1st Class
- Principality of Lippe: War Merit Cross
- Grand Duchy of Mecklenburg-Schwerin: House Order of the Wendish Crown, Grand Cross with Crown in Ore
- Kingdom of Prussia:
  - Order of the Black Eagle, Knight 07.09.1909
  - Order of the Red Eagle:
    - Grand Cross with Oakleaves en sautoir
    - Swords to the Grand Cross with Oakleaves en sautoir
  - Iron Cross, 1st and 2nd Class
  - Kaiser Wilhelm I Memorial Medal (Centenary Medal) (1897)
- Kingdom of Saxony:
  - Order of the Rue Crown, Knight (1898)
  - Albert Order, Grand Cross with Swords (4 May 1916)
- Grand Duchy of Saxe-Weimar-Eisenach: Order of the White Falcon, Grand Cross
- Principality of Schaumburg-Lippe: House Order of the Cross of Honor, 1st Class

=== Foreign states ===
- Austria-Hungary: Military Merit Cross, 2nd Class with War Decoration
- Kingdom of Bulgaria: Order of Military Merit, Grand Cross with War Decoration
- Kingdom of Denmark: Order of the Dannebrog, Grand Cross (10 June 1903)
- Sovereign Military Order of Malta: Knight of Honor and Devotion
- Principality of Monaco: Order of Saint Charles, Grand Cross (4 December 1883)
- Ottoman Empire:
  - Order of Osmanieh, 1st Class
  - Liakat Medal in Gold with Sabers
  - Imtiaz Medal in Gold
  - Imtiaz Medal in Silver
  - War Medal

== Ancestors ==
Ancestors of Wilhelm Karl, Duke of Urach

8. Frederick II Eugene, Duke of Württemberg
4. Duke Wilhelm Frederick of Württemberg
9. Margravine Friederike of Brandenburg-Schwedt
2. Wilhelm, 1st Duke of Urach
10. Baron Friedrich Karl von Tunderfeldt-Rhodis
5. Baroness Wilhelmine von Tunderfeldt-Rhodis
11. Baroness Therese Wilhelmine Schilling von Canstatt
1. Wilhelm, 2nd Duke of Urach
12. Honoré IV, Prince of Monaco
6. Florestan I, Prince of Monaco
13. Louise Félicité d'Aumont Mazarin
3. Princess Florestine of Monaco
14. Charles-Thomas Gibert
7. Maria Caroline Gibert de Lametz
15. Marie-Françoise Le Gras de Vaubercey

== See also ==
- List of Lithuanian rulers
- Mindaugas
- House of Mindaugas
- Prince Frederick Charles of Hesse
- Archduke Charles Stephen of Austria
- Monaco Succession Crisis of 1918
- Florestan I children
- Duke Adolf Friedrich of Mecklenburg
- Kingdom of Finland (1918)

Wilhelm Karl, 2nd Duke of Urach House of Württemberg Born: 30 May 1864 Died: 24 March 1928
German nobility
Preceded by Wilhelm, 1st Duke of Urach	Duke of Urach; 17 July 1869 – 11 August 1919	Succeeded by German nobility titles abolished
Regnal titles
Vacant Title last held by Vytautas	King of Lithuania; 11 July 1918 – 2 November 1918	Succeeded by Republic established
Titles in pretence
Loss of title	— TITULAR — King of Lithuania; 2 November 1918 – 24 March 1928	Succeeded by Karl I (Karl Gero, 3rd Duke of Urach)
Loss of title	— TITULAR — Duke of Urach; 11 August 1919 – 24 March 1928	Succeeded by Karl I (Karl Gero, 3rd Duke of Urach)
