= Caroline of Baden =

Electress/Queen of Bavaria from 1799 to 1825

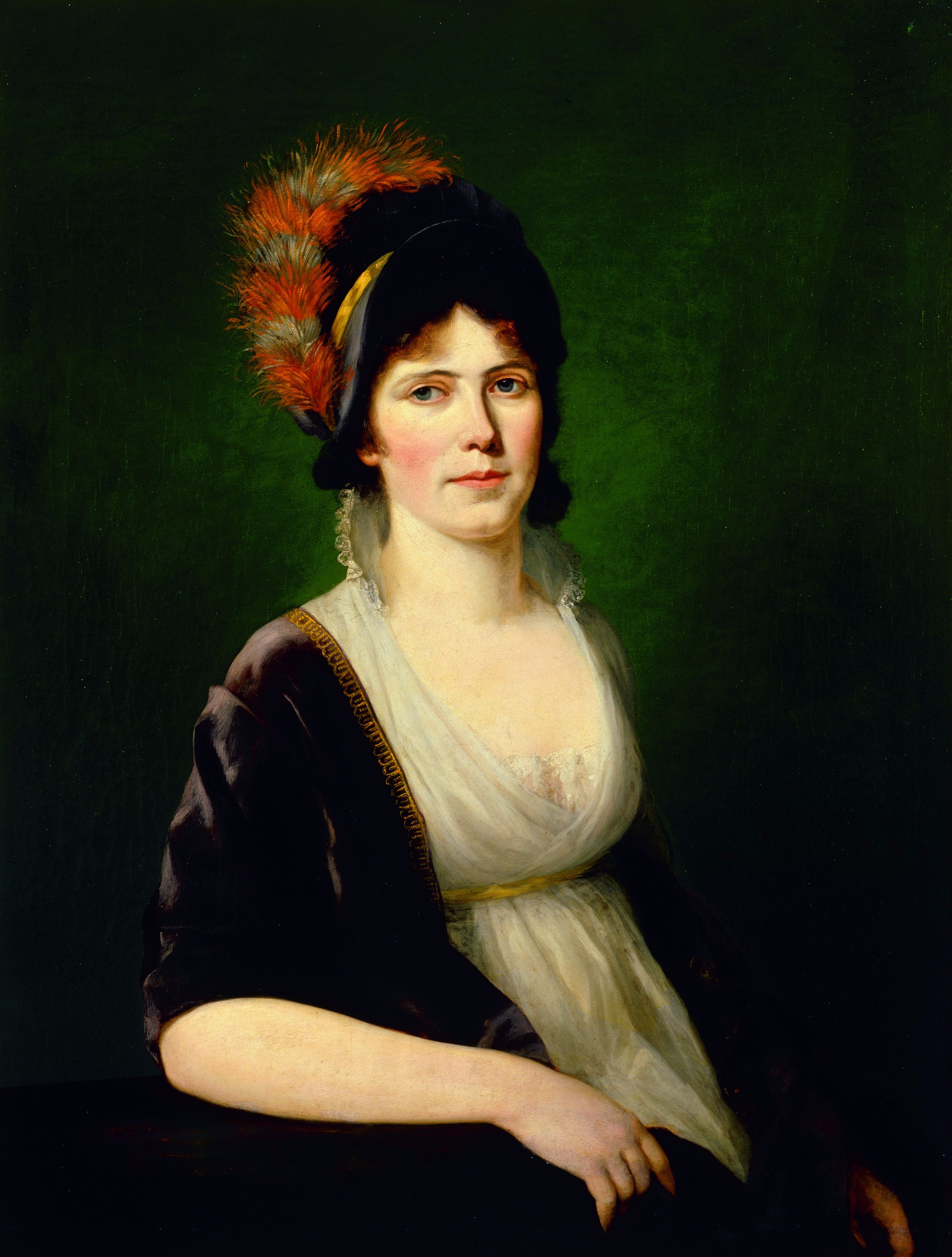
- Portrait, c. 1800–10

Queen consort of Bavaria
- Tenure: 1 January 1806 – 13 October 1825

Electress consort of Bavaria
- Tenure: 16 February 1799 – 1 January 1806
- Born: 13 July 1776; Karlsruhe, Margraviate of Baden
- Died: 13 November 1841 (aged 65); Munich, Kingdom of Bavaria
- Burial: Theatine Church
- Spouse: Maximilian I Joseph of Bavaria (m. 1797; died 1825)
- Issue: Elizabeth Ludovika, Queen of Prussia; Amalie Auguste, Queen of Saxony; Maria Anna, Queen of Saxony; Sophie, Archduchess of Austria; Ludovika, Duchess in Bavaria; Princess Maximiliana
Names
- Friederike Karoline Wilhelmine
- House: Zähringen
- Father: Charles Louis, Hereditary Prince of Baden
- Mother: Landgravine Amalie of Hesse-Darmstadt

Caroline of Baden (German: Friederike Karoline Wilhelmine von Baden; 13 July 1776 – 13 November 1841) was by marriage an Electress of Bavaria and later the first Queen consort of Bavaria by marriage to Maximilian I Joseph.

== Early life ==
She was the eldest child of Charles Louis, Hereditary Prince of Baden, and his wife Amalie of Hesse-Darmstadt. She was born on 13 July 1776 along with her twin sister, Katharina Amalie Christiane Luise, better known as Princess Amalie of Baden

She was one of the granddaughters of The Great Landgräfin Countess Palatine Caroline of Zweibrücken and named after her.

Caroline was considered as a bride for Louis Antoine Henri de Bourbon, Duke of Enghien, but the fear of attracting opposition from France made her family hesitate.

== Marriage ==
On 9 March 1797, in Karlsruhe, she became the second spouse of Maximilian, Duke of Palatine Zweibrücken, who two years later would inherit the Electorate of Bavaria. As a result of the dissolution of the Holy Roman Empire in 1806, the rank of Elector became obsolete, and the ruler of Bavaria was promoted to the rank of King. As a result, Caroline became Queen of Bavaria. Caroline had seven children with her husband, including two pairs of twins, an interesting occurrence considering Caroline was also a twin herself.

She was allowed to keep her Protestant religion and had her own Protestant pastor, which was unique for a Bavarian queen. She was described as a very dignified consort and hostess of the Bavarian court and raised her daughters to have a strong sense of duty.

== Death and funeral ==
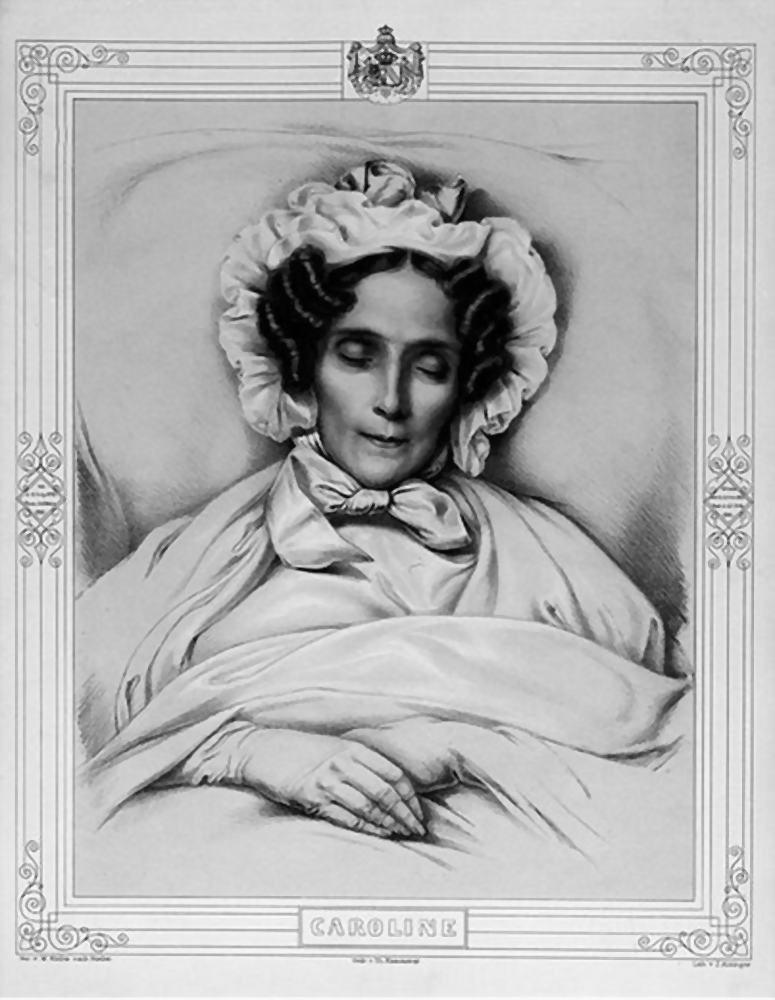
Queen Caroline of Bavaria on her deathbed, 1841

Caroline of Baden died 13 November 1841, outliving her husband by sixteen years and one month. Due to her Protestant religion, her funeral was conducted with so little royal dignity that there were public protests. By order of the Catholic archbishop of Munich, Lothar Anselm von Gebsattel, all participating Catholic clergy were dressed in ordinary clothes instead of church vestments. The Protestant clergy were halted at the church door and not allowed to proceed inside for the service, so Ludwig Friedrich Schmidt gave the funeral sermon there. Afterward, the funeral procession dissipated, and the coffin was placed in the burial crypt without ceremony. This treatment of his beloved stepmother permanently softened the attitude of Caroline's stepson Ludwig I of Bavaria, who up until that time had been a strong opponent of Protestantism despite his marriage to the Protestant princess Therese of Saxe-Hildburghausen.

== Issue ==
Issue
Name	Portrait	Birth	Death	Notes
Son		5 September 1799		Stillborn
Maximilian Joseph Charles		28 October 1800	12 February 1803	Died in childhood
Elisabeth Louise; Queen consort of Prussia		13 November 1801 (twins)	14 December 1873	Married in 1823 the future King Frederick William IV of Prussia and had no issue
Amalie Auguste; Queen consort of Saxony		13 November 1801 (twins)	8 November 1877	Married in 1822 the future King John of Saxony and had issue
Marie Anne Leopoldine; Queen consort of Saxony		27 January 1805 (twins)	13 September 1877	Married in 1833 the future King Frederick Augustus II of Saxony and had no issue
Sophia Frederica; Archduchess of Austria		27 January 1805 (twins)	28 May 1872	Married in 1824 Archduke Franz Karl of Austria and had issue
Louise Wilhelmina; Duchess in Bavaria		30 August 1808	25 January 1892	Married in 1828 Duke Maximilian Joseph in Bavaria and had issue
Maximiliana Josepha Caroline		21 July 1810	4 February 1821	Died in childhood

== Honours ==
- Electorate of Bavaria / Kingdom of Bavaria : Sovereign of the Order of Saint Elizabeth (feminine order)
- Russian Empire : Dame Grand Cross of the Order of Saint Catherine, 9 April 1801

== Ancestors ==
Ancestors of Caroline of Baden

8. Frederick, Hereditary Prince of Baden-Durlach
4. Charles Frederick, Grand Duke of Baden
9. Princess Amalia of Nassau-Dietz
2. Charles Louis, Hereditary Prince of Baden
10. Louis VIII, Landgrave of Hesse-Darmstadt
5. Princess Caroline Louise of Hesse-Darmstadt
11. Countess Charlotte of Hanau-Lichtenberg
1. Caroline of Baden
12. Louis VIII, Landgrave of Hesse-Darmstadt (= 10)
6. Louis IX, Landgrave of Hesse-Darmstadt
13. Countess Charlotte of Hanau-Lichtenberg (= 11)
3. Princess Amalie of Hesse-Darmstadt
14. Christian III, Count Palatine of Zweibrücken
7. Countess Palatine Caroline of Zweibrücken
15. Countess Caroline of Nassau-Saarbrücken

Caroline of Baden House of Zähringen Born: 13 July 1776 Died: 13 November 1841
German royalty
Preceded by Augusta Wilhelmina of Hesse-Darmstadt	Duchess of Zweibrücken; 1797–1825	Succeeded by Last of title
Preceded by Maria Leopoldine of Austria-Este	Electress of Bavaria; 1799–1806	Succeeded by Last of title
Preceded by New title	Queen of Bavaria; 1806–1825	Succeeded by Therese of Saxe-Hildburghausen
