= Amalie Auguste of Bavaria =

Queen of Saxony from 1854 to 1873

- Photograph, c. 1860

Queen consort of Saxony
- Tenure: 9 August 1854 – 29 October 1873
- Born: 13 November 1801; Munich, Electorate of Bavaria, Holy Roman Empire
- Died: 8 November 1877 (aged 75); Dresden, Kingdom of Saxony, German Empire
- Burial: Katholische Hofkirche, Dresden
- Spouse: John, King of Saxony (m. 1822; died 1873)
- Issue more...: Albert, King of Saxony; Maria Elisabeth, Duchess of Genoa; George, King of Saxony; Anna, Grand Princess of Tuscany; Margaretha, Archduchess of Austria; Sophie, Duchess in Bavaria
- House: Wittelsbach
- Father: Maximilian I Joseph of Bavaria
- Mother: Caroline of Baden

Princess Amalie Auguste of Bavaria (13 November 1801 in Munich – 8 November 1877 in Dresden) was a Bavarian princess by birth and Queen of Saxony by marriage to King John of Saxony.

== Biography ==
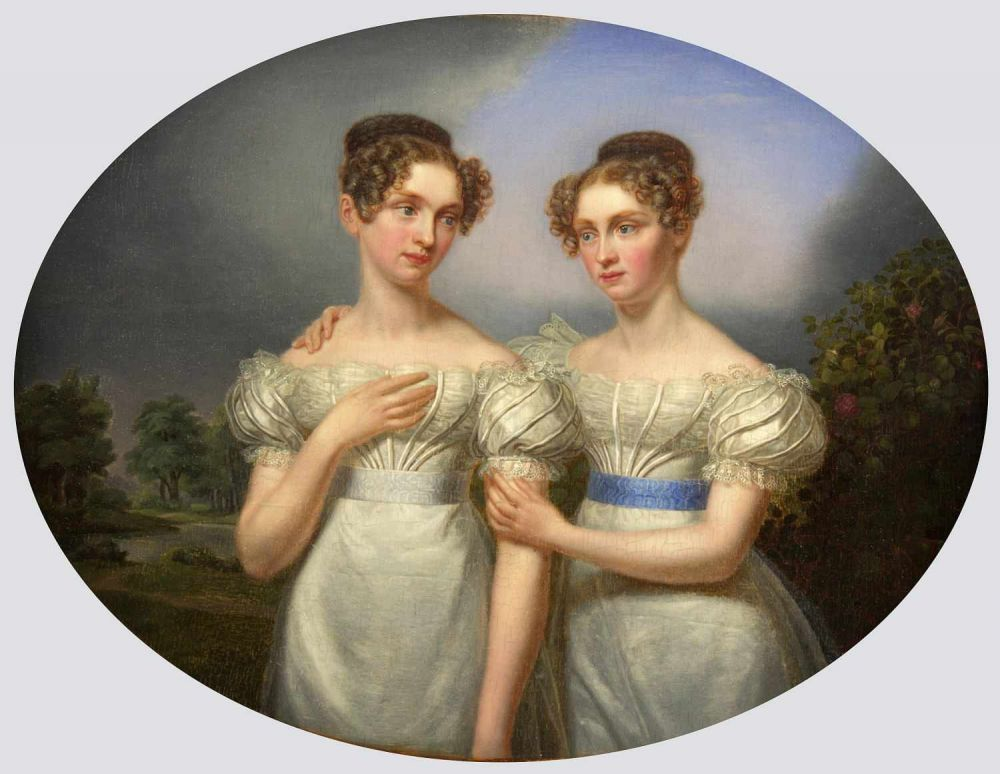
Portrait of Amalie Auguste with her twin sister Elisabeth Ludovika, 1820s

Amalie was the fourth child of King Maximilian I Joseph of Bavaria and his second wife Caroline of Baden. She was the identical twin sister of Elisabeth Ludovika, later Queen of Prussia as wife of Frederick William IV of Prussia. Three other sisters married King Frederick Augustus II of Saxony, Archduke Franz Karl of Austria and Maximilian Joseph, Duke in Bavaria.

In 1851 Amalie Auguste became chairwoman of Women's Association of Dresden (Frauenverein zu Dresden), an organisation founded by her sister, the then queen. Three years later, her husband inherited the throne and she became queen. In 1859 she reorganized the association as the Zentralausschuß obererzgebirgischen und der vogtländischen Frauenvereine and established a legal basis for it, under which the organisation continued until 1932.

== Marriage and issue ==
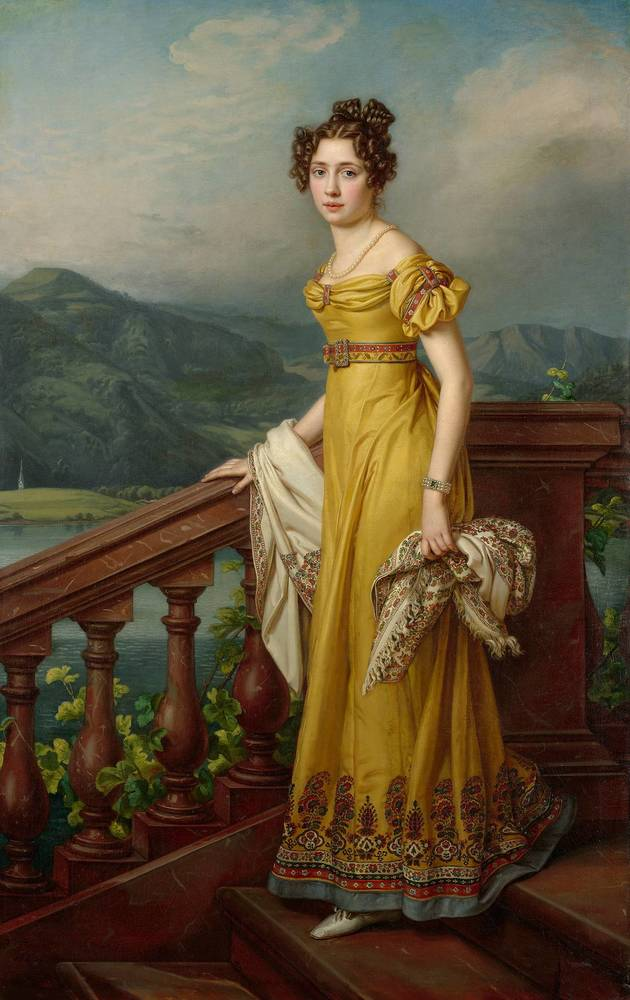
Portrait of Amalie Auguste of Bavaria by Joseph Karl Stieler

Amalie Auguste married on 21 November 1822 Prince John of Saxony, who reigned as King of Saxony between 1854 and 1873. John and Amalie had nine children, of whom six died at young ages and predeceased her:

- Marie Auguste Friederike (1827–1857), died of tuberculosis
- Albert (1828–1902). Married Princess Carola, daughter of Crown Prince Gustav of Sweden
- Maria Elisabeth (1830–1912). Married first Ferdinando, Prince of Savoy and Sardinia, and second Niccolò, Marchese Rapallo.
- Friedrich August Ernst (1831–1847), died in childhood
- George (1832–1904). Married Infanta Maria Anna of Portugal
- Maria Sidonia (1834–1862), died of fever
- Anna (1836–1859). Married Ferdinand IV, Grand Duke of Tuscany and died in childbirth.
- Margaretha (1840–1858). Married her cousin Archduke Karl Ludwig of Austria, and died from typhoid fever.
- Sophie (1845–1867). Married her cousin Karl-Theodor, Duke in Bavaria (brother of Empress Elisabeth of Austria), died from influenza.

== Ancestry ==
Ancestors of Amalie Auguste of Bavaria

8. Christian III, Count Palatine of Zweibrücken
4. Frederick Michael, Count Palatine of Zweibrücken
9. Countess Caroline of Nassau-Saarbrücken
2. Maximilian I Joseph of Bavaria
10. Joseph Charles, Hereditary Prince of Sulzbach
5. Countess Palatine Maria Franziska of Sulzbach
11. Countess Palatine Elisabeth Auguste Sofie of Neuburg
1. Amalie Auguste of Bavaria
12. Charles Frederick, Grand Duke of Baden
6. Charles Louis, Hereditary Prince of Baden
13. Princess Caroline Louise of Hesse-Darmstadt
3. Princess Caroline of Baden
14. Louis IX, Landgrave of Hesse-Darmstadt
7. Princess Amalie of Hesse-Darmstadt
15. Countess Palatine Caroline of Zweibrücken

== Sources ==
- Petermann, Karl: Der König Johann und die Königin Amalie von Sachsen, sowie die Feier ihres goldenen Ehejubiläums; in: Erzählungen. O.Author, o.J.

Amalie Auguste of Bavaria House of Palatinate-Zweibrücken-Birkenfeld Cadet branch of the House of Wittelsbach Born: 13 November 1801 Died: 8 November 1877
German royalty
Preceded by Maria Anna of Bavaria	Queen consort of Saxony; 9 August 1854 – 29 October 1873	Succeeded by Carola of Vasa
