= Charlotte Grimm =

Sister of Jacob Grimm and Wilhelm Grimm, 1793–1833

Charlotte Hassenpflug
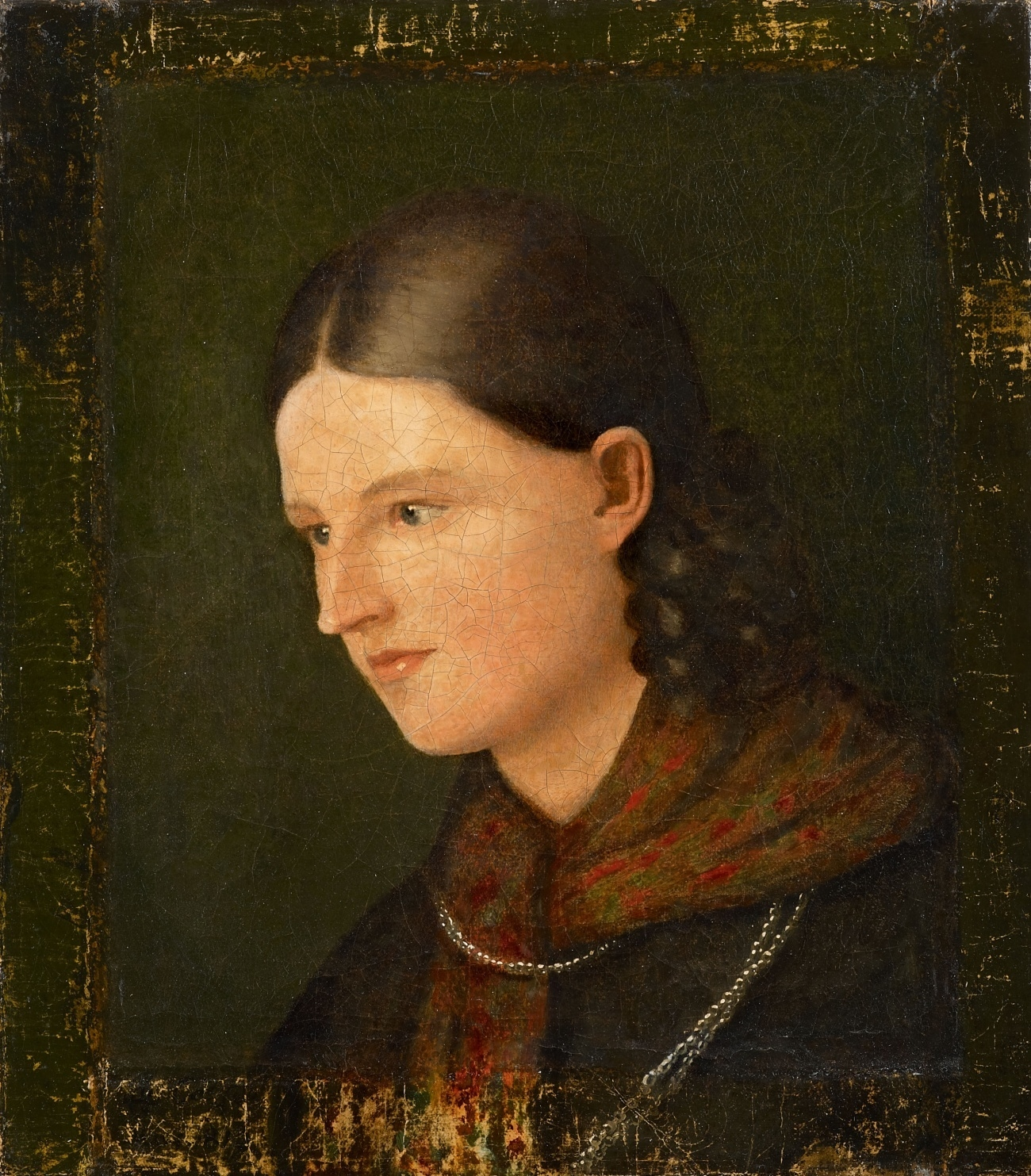
- 1818 portrait
- Born: Charlotte Amalie Grimm; 10 March 1793; Steinau an der Straße, Hesse, Germany
- Died: 15 June 1833 (aged 40); Kassel, Hesse, Germany
- Spouse: Ludwig Hassenpflug (m. 1822)
- Children: 9
- Parents: Philipp Grimm (father); Dorothea Grimm (mother)
- Relatives: Jacob Grimm (brother); Ludwig Emil Grimm (brother); Wilhelm Grimm (brother)

Charlotte Amalie "Lotte" Hassenpflug, née Grimm (10 March 1793 – 15 June 1833), was the sister of the Brothers Grimm (Jacob and Wilhelm) and their younger brother Ludwig.

== Biography ==
Charlotte Amalie Grimm, nicknamed Lotte, was the eighth of nine children born to Philipp and Dorothea Grimm; she was born 10 March 1793 in Steinau an der Straße. She was their only daughter and shared a close bond with her brothers Jacob and Wilhelm from a young age.

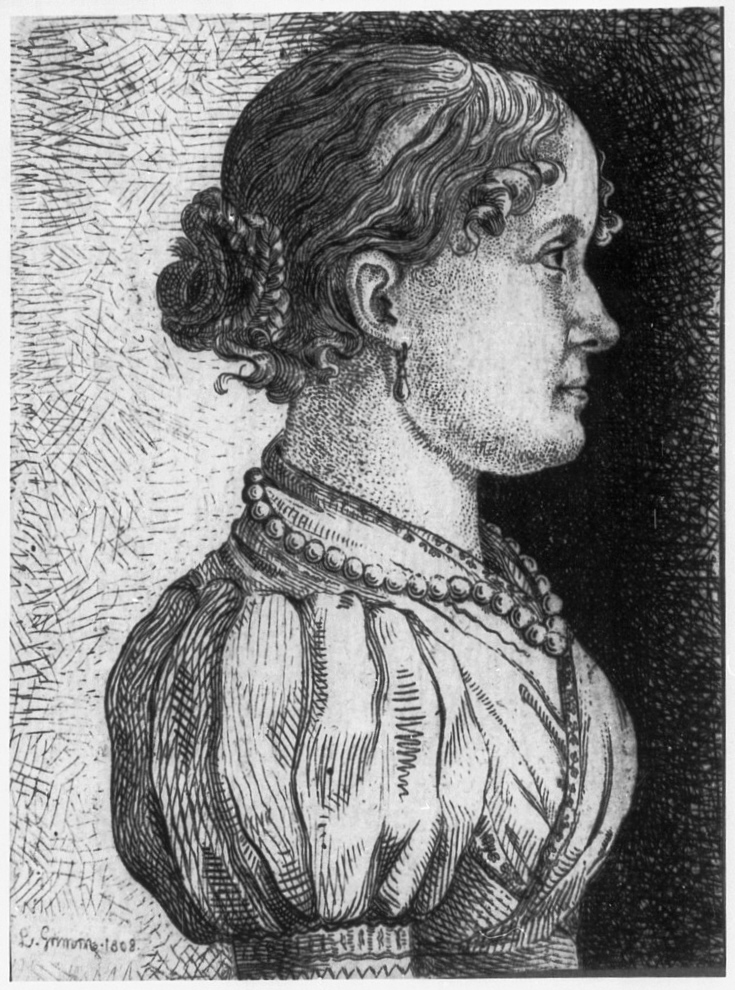
1808 portrait of Charlotte Grimm by Ludwig Emil Grimm.

She was fifteen years old when her mother died in 1808, making her the only remaining female family member. She had to run the household for the family until her marriage. The sudden responsibilities this entailed initially overwhelmed her, and during the immediate period after her mother's death, the siblings only managed to maintain family unity to a very limited extent. She would later receive written advice and financial support for running the household from her aunt, Henriette Philippine Zimmer, from Gotha.

She then became a skilled hostess, such as when Friedrich Carl von Savigny visited Kassel in 1815 and when Annette von Droste-Hülshoff visited Kassel in 1818.

Charlotte, Jacob, Wilhelm and Ludwig Emil Grimm formed a harmonious household from then on, which only ended when Charlotte left the shared household on the occasion of her marriage to Ludwig Hassenpflug in the summer of 1822. Only the departure of their sister apparently prompted Jacob and Wilhelm Grimm to consider their own marriage.

=== Death ===
After her sixth child Dorothea was born on 23 May 1833, Charlotte Hassenpflug quickly became unwell due to complications arising from childbirth and had to be cared for by her brother Wilhelm. She never recovered and died on 15 June 1833 aged 40.

== Personal life ==
On 2 July 1822, she married Ludwig Hassenpflug. They had six children together:

- Karl (5 January 1824 ‐ 18 February 1890), sculptor, died childless
- Agnes (11 December 1825 – 29 October 1829)
- Bertha (27 April 1829 – 9 June 1830)
- Friedrich (10 September 1827 – 23 January 1892). Higher Regional Court Councillor in Breslau, married to Anna Volmar, daughter of a ministerial colleague of his father
- Ludwig Werner (1 December 1831 – 11 October 1878), officer in the Austrian Navy, married, childless
- Dorothea (23 May 1833 – 1898)
