= Dorothea Grimm =

Mother of the Brothers Grimm

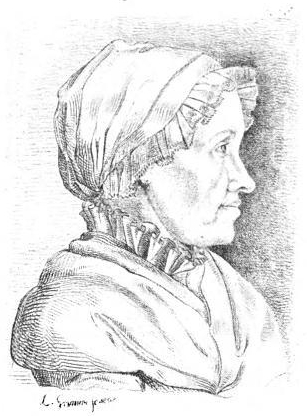
- 1808 portrait
- Born: Dorothea Zimmer; November 20, 1755; Kassel, Hesse, Holy Roman Empire
- Died: May 27, 1808 (aged 52); Kassel, Hesse, Germany
- Resting place: Altstädter Cemetery, Kassel
- Spouse: Philipp Grimm (m. 1783)
- Children: 9, including Jacob, Wilhelm, and Ludwig
- Relatives: Ludwig Hassenpflug (son-in-law)

Dorothea Grimm (née Zimmer; November 20, 1755 – May 27, 1808) was the mother to the "Brothers Grimm" Jacob and Wilhelm, and seven other children, including Ludwig Emil Grimm and Charlotte Grimm.

== Early life and family ==
Dorothea was born on November 20, 1755, in Kassel, Hesse, Germany, the daughter of Johann Hermann Zimmer, a Kassel city councilman and Anna Elisabeth Zimmer.

On February 23, 1783, Dorothea married lawyer Philipp Wilhelm Grimm, with whom she had 8 sons and one daughter. Their children were as follows:

- Friedrich Hermann Georg Grimm (1783–1784)
- Jacob Ludwig Carl Grimm (1785–1863)
- Wilhelm Carl Grimm (1786–1859)
- Carl Friedrich Grimm (1787–1852)
- Ferdinand Philipp Grimm (1788–1844)
- Ludwig Emil Grimm (1790–1863)
- Friedrich Grimm (1791–1792)
- Charlotte (Lotte) Amalie Hassenpflug, née Grimm (1793–1833)
- Georg Eduard Grimm (1794–1795)

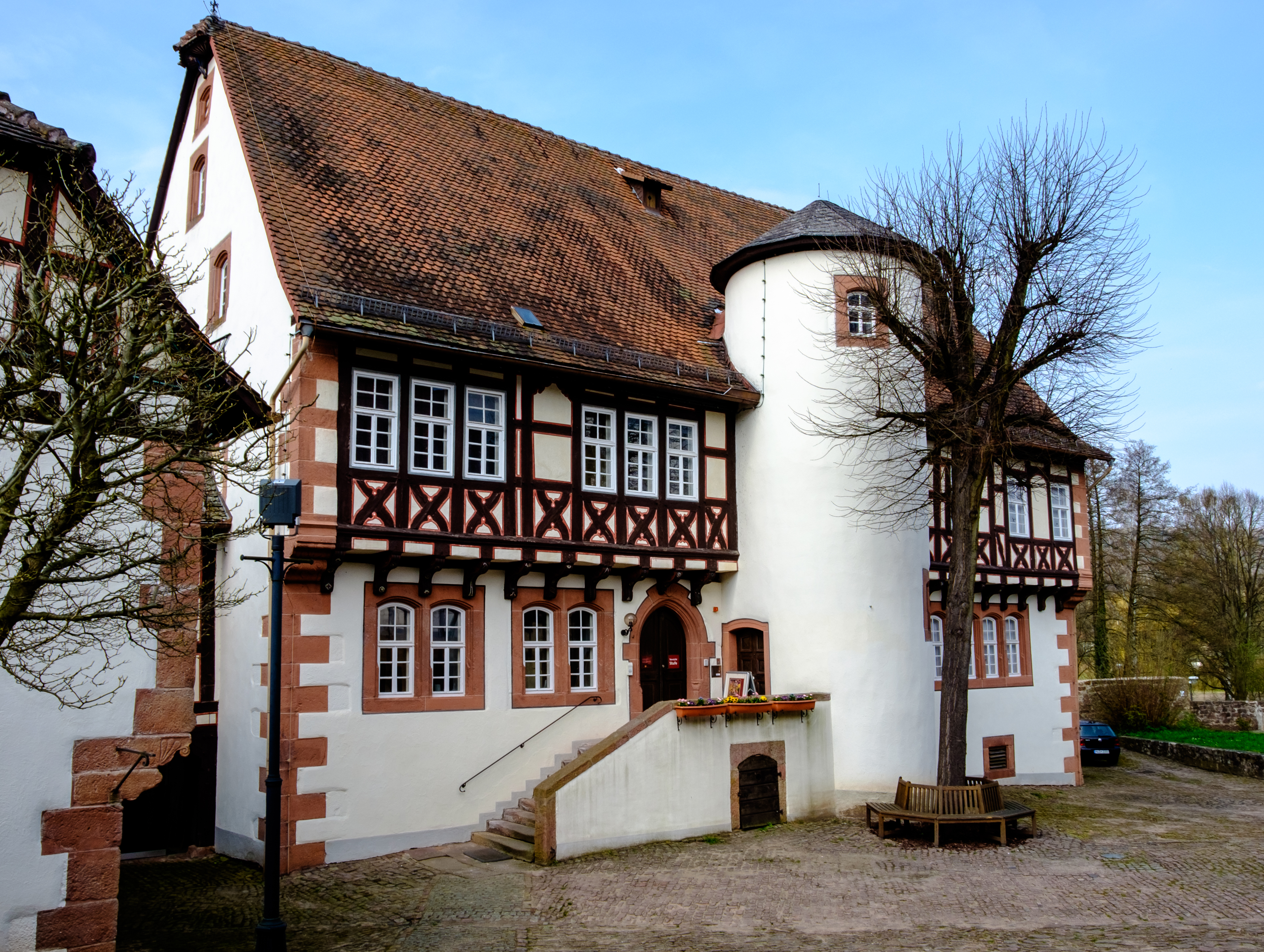
The Grimm family lived in this house in Steinau from 1791 to 1796

=== Household and later life ===
In 1791, the Grimm family moved to the town of Steinau an der Straße where Philipp had been named as a district magistrate. During this period, they maintained a large house and servants, and were prominent members of the local community. Dorothea took care of managing the household and raising their family, employed private tutors to visit the home, and sent their children to school for a classical education once they were of age. A devout Lutheran, Dorothea instilled devout religious values within the household.

Dorothea encouraged her children to pursue an education and wrote to the government asking for special permission for her sons to be admitted to the University of Marburg, which was subsequently granted. Her sons developed their interest in German folklore during their time at the University, which grew into a lifelong dedication to collecting German folk tales.

In 1796, Dorothea's husband died from pneumonia at the age of 44. This caused great financial hardship for the family as they lost their household income, large house, and servants, and Dorothea relied heavily on her father Johann for financial support, as well as her sister Henriette, who was then the first lady-in-waiting at the court of William I, Elector of Hesse. Despite the moderate support she was provided, Dorothea lived in relative poverty for the rest of her life.

== Death ==
Dorothea died on May 27, 1808, at the age of 52 in Kassel, leaving her son Jacob to take responsibility for his younger siblings. She is buried in Altstädter cemetery in Kassel.

== In popular culture ==
Scholars and critics including Alistair Hauke have written that Dorothea may have influenced the Brothers Grimm view of the concept of motherhood in high and "sacred" esteem, which influenced their decision to change the maternal villain character to a wicked stepmother instead of a biological mother in their later versions of Snow White and Hansel and Gretel.

Dorothea is portrayed by Claire Bloom in the 1962 American fantasy film The Wonderful World of the Brothers Grimm, which received the Academy Award for Best Costume Design.

Dorothea is a character in Grimm's Last Fairytale, a 1999 novel by Haydn Middleton (St. Martin's Publishing Group).

Dorothea is portrayed by Barbora Lukesová in the 2005 film The Brothers Grimm.
