= Philipp Grimm =

German lawyer (1751–1796)

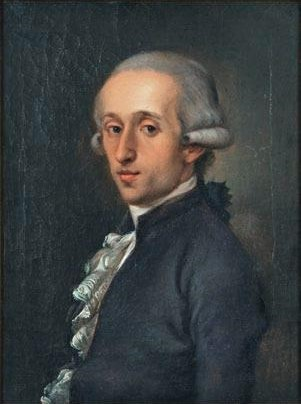
- 1788 portrait
- Born: Philipp Wilhelm Grimm; 19 September 1751
- Died: 10 January 1796 (aged 44); Steinau an der Straße, Hesse, Germany
- Resting place: Katharinenkirche, Steinau
- Spouse: Dorothea Zimmer (m. 1783)
- Children: 9, including Jacob, Wilhelm, and Ludwig
- Relatives: Ludwig Hassenpflug (son-in-law)

Philipp Wilhelm Grimm (19 September 1751 – 10 January 1796) was a German lawyer and father to the Brothers Grimm and seven other children, including Ludwig Emil Grimm and Charlotte Amalie Grimm. He was husband of Dorothea Grimm borned Zimmer.

== Early life and family ==
Philipp Wilhelm Grimm was born on 19 September 1751. His parents were pastor Friedrich Grimm the Younger and Christine Elisabeth Heilmann. His mother died when he was three years old and her death struck the family extremely hard.

On February 23, 1783, Grimm married Dorothea Zimmer, with whom he had 8 sons and one daughter. Their children were as follows:

- Friedrich Hermann Georg Grimm (1783–1784)
- Jacob Ludwig Carl Grimm (1785–1863)
- Wilhelm Carl Grimm (1786–1859)
- Carl Friedrich Grimm (1787–1852)
- Ferdinand Philipp Grimm (1788–1844)
- Ludwig Emil Grimm (1790–1863)
- Friedrich Grimm (1791–1792)
- Charlotte (Lotte) Amalie Hassenpflug, née Grimm (1793–1833)
- Georg Eduard Grimm (1794–1795)

== Career ==
Grimm studied law at the High State School in Hanau, the High School Herborn, and the Philipps-Universität Marburg.

In 1778 he became a court lawyer in Hanau, and in 1782 he became the town clerk of the Altstadt Hanau and also the Landschreiber the Office Büchertal the county of Hanau in the Imperial Principality of Hesse-Kassel before receiving the title of city secretary of Hanau in 1787.

In 1791 he relocated his family to the countryside town of Steinau an der Straße after he was employed there as a district magistrate (Amtmann). The Grimm family subsequently became prominent members of the community, residing in a large home surrounded by fields.

== Death ==
On 10 January 1796 Philipp Grimm died of pneumonia at the age of 44, causing great poverty for the large family because they lost their household income, large house, and servants.

He died in Steinau an der Straße.
