= Jacob Grimm =

German linguist, jurist and mythologist (1785-1863)

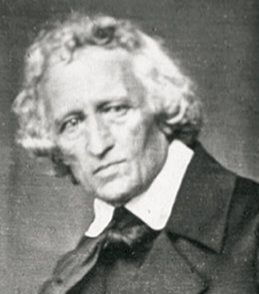
- Grimm in 1847
- Born: Jacob Ludwig Karl Grimm; 4 January 1785; Hanau, Landgraviate of Hesse-Kassel, Holy Roman Empire
- Died: 20 September 1863 (aged 78); Berlin, Kingdom of Prussia, German Confederation
- Parents: Philipp Grimm (father); Dorothea Grimm (mother)
- Relatives: Wilhelm Grimm (brother); Ludwig Emil Grimm (brother); Herman Grimm (nephew); Ludwig Hassenpflug (brother-in-law)

Academic background
- Education: University of Marburg

Academic work
- Institutions: University of Göttingen; University of Berlin
- Notable students: Wilhelm Dilthey
- Influenced: August Schleicher

Signature
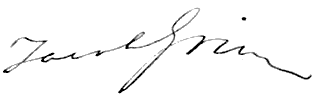

Jacob Ludwig Karl Grimm (4 January 1785 – 20 September 1863), also known as Ludwig Karl, was a German author, linguist, philologist, jurist, and folklorist. He formulated Grimm's law of linguistics, and was the co-author of the Deutsches Wörterbuch, the author of Deutsche Mythologie, and the editor of Grimms' Fairy Tales. He was the older brother of Wilhelm Grimm; together, they were the literary duo known as the Brothers Grimm.

== Life and books ==
Jacob Grimm was born 4 January 1785, in Hanau in Hesse-Kassel. His father, Philipp Grimm, was a lawyer who died while Jacob was a child, and his mother Dorothea was left with a very small income. Her sister was the lady of the chamber to the Landgravine of Hesse, and she helped to support and educate the family. Jacob was sent to the public school at Kassel in 1798 along with his younger brother Wilhelm.

In 1802, he went to the University of Marburg, where he studied law, a profession for which he had been intended by his father. His brother joined him at Marburg a year later, having just recovered from a severe illness, and likewise began the study of law. He then later with his brother, Wilhelm Grimm, wrote Grimms' Fairy Tales.

=== Meeting von Savigny ===
Jacob Grimm became inspired by the lectures of Friedrich Carl von Savigny, a noted expert of Roman law; Wilhelm Grimm, in the preface to the Deutsche Grammatik (German Grammar), credits Savigny with giving the brothers an awareness of science. Savigny's lectures also awakened in Jacob a love for historical and antiquarian investigation, which underlies all his work. It was in Savigny's library that Grimm first saw Bodmer's edition of the Middle High German minnesingers and other early texts, which gave him a desire to study their language.

At the beginning of 1805, he was invited by Savigny to Paris, to help him in his literary work. There Grimm strengthened his taste for the literature of the Middle Ages. Towards the close of the year, he returned to Kassel, where his mother and brother had settled after Wilhelm finished his studies. The following year, Jacob obtained a position in the war office with a small salary of 100 thalers. He complained that he had to exchange his stylish Paris suit for a stiff uniform and pigtail, but the role gave him spare time for the pursuit of his studies.

=== Librarianship ===
In 1808, soon after the death of his mother, Grimm was appointed superintendent of the private library of Jérôme Bonaparte, who was the King of Westphalia. His electorate, the Hesse-Kassel, had been incorporated by Napoleon. Grimm was appointed an auditor of the state council, while still retaining his superintendent post. His salary increased to 4000 francs and his official duties were nominal. In 1813, after the expulsion of Bonaparte and the reinstatement of an elector, Grimm was appointed Secretary of Legation accompanying the Hessian minister to the headquarters of the allied army. In 1814, he was sent to Paris to demand restitution of books then taken by the French, and he attended the Congress of Vienna as Secretary of Legation between 1814 and 1815. Upon his return from Vienna, he was sent to Paris again to secure book restitutions. Meanwhile, Wilhelm had obtained a job at the Kassel library, and Jacob was made second librarian under Volkel in 1816. Upon the death of Volkel in 1828, the brothers both expected promotion, but they were dissatisfied when the role of the first librarian was given to Rommel, who was the keeper of the archives. Consequently, they moved the following year to the University of Göttingen, where Jacob was appointed professor and librarian, while Wilhelm was appointed as under-librarian. Jacob Grimm lectured on legal antiquities, historical grammar, literary history, and diplomatics, while also explaining Old German poems, and commented on the Germania of Tacitus.

=== Later work ===
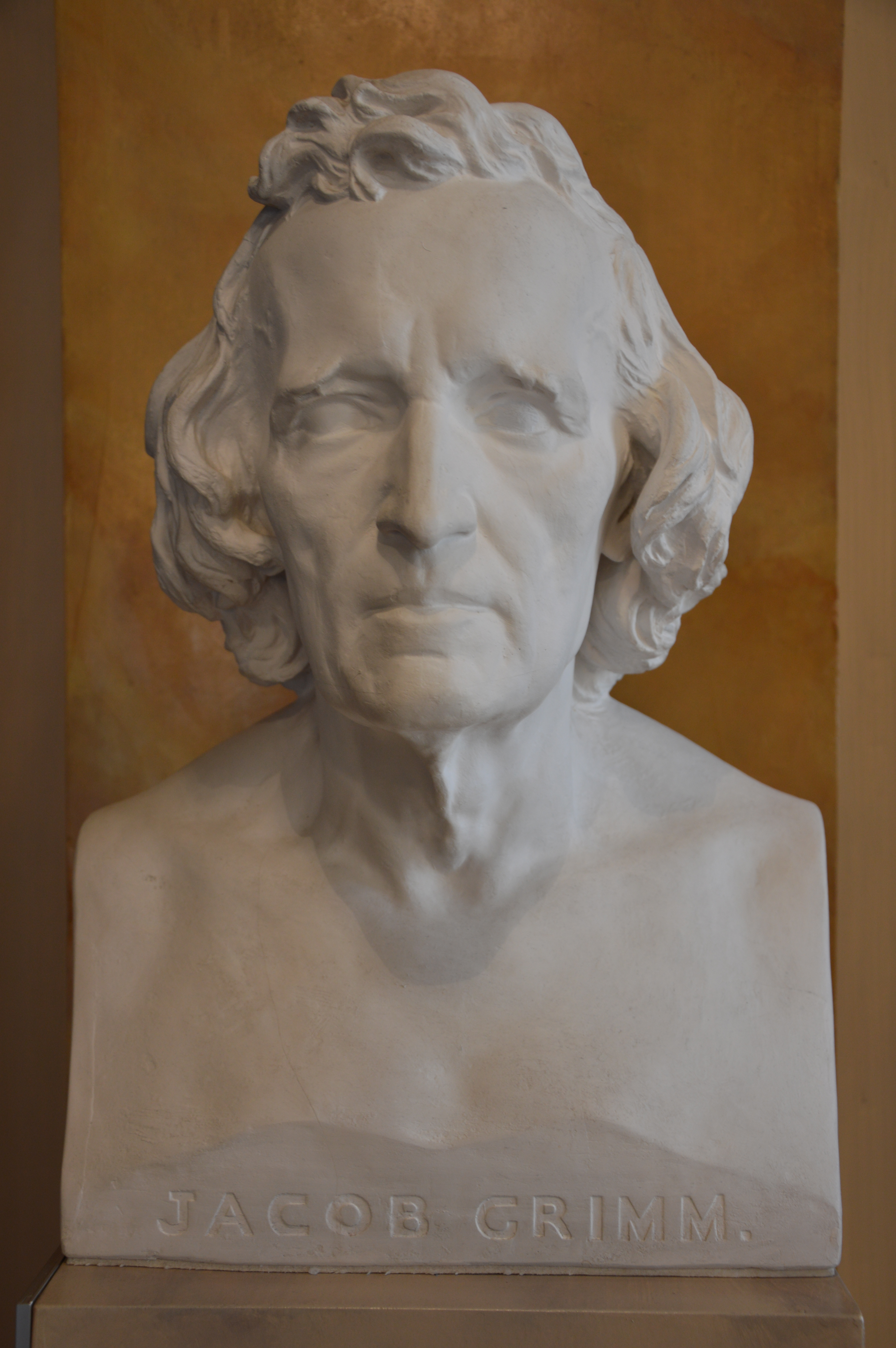
Marble bust of Grimm by Elisabet Ney, carved 1856–58 in Berlin

Grimm joined other academics, known as the Göttingen Seven, who signed a protest against the King of Hanover's abrogation of the liberal constitution which had been established some years before. As a result, he was dismissed from his professorship and banished from the Kingdom of Hanover in 1837. He returned to Kassel with his brother, who had also signed the protest. They remained there until 1840 when they accepted King Frederick William IV's invitation to move to the University of Berlin, where they both received professorships and were elected members of the Academy of Sciences. Grimm was not under any obligation to lecture, and seldom did so; he spent his time working with his brother on their dictionary project. During their time in Kassel, he regularly attended the meetings of the academy and read papers on varied subjects, including Karl Konrad Friedrich Wilhelm Lachmann, Friedrich Schiller, old age, and the origin of language. He described his impressions of Italian and Scandinavian travel, interspersing more general observations with linguistic details. He was elected a Foreign Honorary Member of the American Academy of Arts and Sciences in 1857.

Grimm died in Berlin at the age of 78, working until the very end of his life. He describes his own work at the end of his autobiography:

Nearly all my labours have been devoted, either directly or indirectly, to the investigation of our earlier language, poetry and laws. These studies may have appeared to many, and may still appear, useless; to me they have always seemed a noble and earnest task, definitely and inseparably connected with our common fatherland, and calculated to foster the love of it. My principle has always been in these investigations to under-value nothing, but to utilize the small for the illustration of the great, the popular tradition for the elucidation of the written monuments.

== Linguistic work ==
=== History of the German Language ===
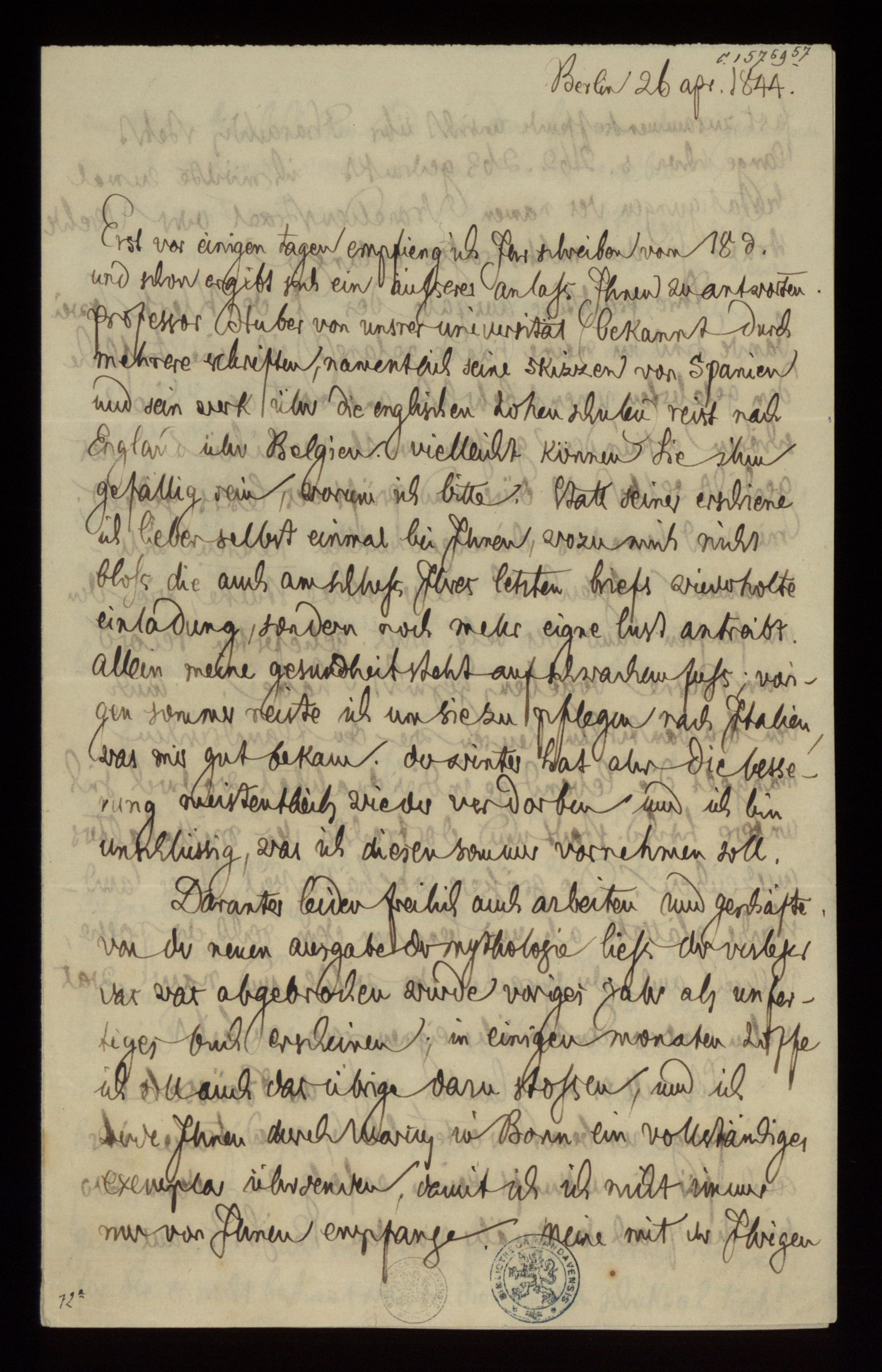
During the research for his 'History of the German Language' Grimm corresponded with numerous colleagues. Ghent University Library holds several letters between Jacob Grimm and Jan Frans Willems.

Grimm's Geschichte der deutschen Sprache (History of the German Language) explores German history hidden in the words of the German language and is the oldest linguistic history of the Teutonic tribes. He collected scattered words and allusions from classical literature and tried to determine the relationship between the German language and those of the Getae, Thracians, Scythians, and other nations whose languages were known only through Greek and Latin authors. Grimm's results were later greatly modified by a wider range of available comparisons and improved methods of investigation. Many questions that he raised remain obscure due to the lack of surviving records of the languages, but his book's influence was profound.

=== German Grammar ===
Grimm's famous Deutsche Grammatik (German Grammar) was the outcome of his purely philological work. He drew on the work of past generations, from the humanists onwards, consulting an enormous collection of materials in the form of text editions, dictionaries, and grammars, mostly uncritical and unreliable. Some work had been done in the way of comparison and determination of general laws, and the concept of a comparative Germanic grammar had been grasped by the Englishman George Hickes by the beginning of the 18th century, in his Thesaurus. Ten Kate in the Netherlands had made valuable contributions to the history and comparison of Germanic languages. Grimm himself did not initially intend to include all the languages in his Grammar, but he soon found that Old High German postulated Gothic, and that the later stages of German could not be understood without the help of other West Germanic varieties including English, and that the literature of Scandinavia could not be ignored. The first edition of the first part of the Grammar, which appeared in 1819, treated the inflections of all these languages, and included a general introduction in which he vindicated the importance of a historical study of the German language against the quasi-philosophical methods then in vogue.

In 1822 the book appeared in a second edition (really a new work, for, as Grimm himself says in the preface, he had to "mow the first crop down to the ground"). The considerable gap between the two stages of Grimm's development of these editions is shown by the fact that the second volume addresses phonology in 600 pages – more than half the volume. Grimm had concluded that all philology must be based on rigorous adherence to the laws of sound change, and he subsequently never deviated from this principle. This gave to all his investigations a consistency and force of conviction that had been lacking in the study of philology before his day.

His advances have been attributed mainly to the influence of his contemporary Rasmus Christian Rask. Rask was two years younger than Grimm, but the Icelandic paradigms in Grimm's first editions are based entirely on Rask's grammar; in his second edition, he relied almost entirely on Rask for Old English. His debt to Rask is shown by comparing his treatment of Old English in the two editions. For example, in the first edition he declines dæg, dæges, plural dægas, without having observed the law of vowel-change pointed out by Rask. (The correct plural is dagas.) The appearance of Rask's Old English grammar was probably the primary impetus for Grimm to recast his work from the beginning. Rask was also the first to clearly formulate the laws of sound-correspondence in the different languages, especially in the vowels (previously ignored by etymologists).

The Grammar was continued in three volumes, treating principally derivation, composition and syntax, the last of which was unfinished. Grimm then began a third edition, of which only one part, comprising the vowels, appeared in 1840, his time being afterwards taken up mainly by the dictionary. The Grammar is noted for its comprehensiveness, method and fullness of detail, with all his points illustrated by an almost exhaustive mass of material, and it has served as a model for all succeeding investigators. Diez's grammar of the Romance languages is founded entirely on Grimm's methods, which have had a profound influence on the wider study of the Indo-European languages in general.

=== Grimm's law ===
Jacob is recognized for enunciating Grimm's law, the Germanic Sound Shift, which was first observed by the Danish philologist Rasmus Christian Rask. Grimm's law, also known as the "Rask-Grimm Rule" or the First Germanic Sound Shift, was the first law in linguistics concerning a non-trivial sound change. It was a turning point in the development of linguistics, enabling the introduction of a rigorous methodology to historic linguistic research. It concerns the correspondence of consonants between the ancestral Proto-Indo-European language and its Germanic descendants, Low Saxon and High German, and was first fully stated by Grimm in the second edition of the first part of his Grammar. The correspondence of single consonants had been more or less clearly recognized by several of his predecessors, including Friedrich von Schlegel, Rasmus Christian Rask and Johan Ihre, the last having established a considerable number of literarum permutationes, such as b for f, with the examples bœra = ferre ("to bear"), befwer = fibra ("fiber"). Rask, in his essay on the origin of the Icelandic language, gave the same comparisons, with a few additions and corrections, and even the same examples in most cases. As Grimm in the preface to his first edition expressly mentioned Rask's essay, there is every probability that it inspired his own investigations. But there is a wide difference between the isolated permutations described by his predecessors and his own comprehensive generalizations. The extension of the law to High German in any case is entirely Grimm's work.

The idea that Grimm wished to deprive Rask of his priority claims is based on the fact that he does not expressly mention Rask's results in his second edition, but it was always his plan to refrain from all controversy or reference to the works of others. In his first edition, he calls attention to Rask's essay and praises it ungrudgingly. Nevertheless, a certain bitterness of feeling afterwards sprang up between Grimm and Rask, after Rask refused to consider the value of Grimm's views when they clashed with his own.

=== German Dictionary ===
Grimm's monumental dictionary of the German Language, the Deutsches Wörterbuch, was started in 1838 and first published in 1854. The Brothers anticipated it would take 10 years and encompass some six to seven volumes. However, it was undertaken on so large a scale as to make it impossible for them to complete it. The dictionary, as far as it was worked on by Grimm himself, has been described as a collection of disconnected antiquarian essays of high value. It was finally finished by subsequent scholars in 1961 and supplemented in 1971. At 33 volumes at some 330,000 headwords, it remains a standard work of reference to the present day. A current project at the Berlin-Brandenburg Academy of Sciences and Humanities is underway to update the Deutsches Wörterbuch to modern academic standards. Volumes A–F were planned for completion in 2012 by the Language Research Centre at the Berlin-Brandenburg Academy of Sciences and Humanities and the University of Göttingen.

== Literary work ==
The first work Jacob Grimm published, Über den altdeutschen Meistergesang (1811), was of a purely literary character. Yet even in this essay, Grimm showed that Minnesang and Meistergesang were really one form of poetry, of which they merely represented different stages of development, and also announced his important discovery of the invariable division of the Lied into three strophic parts.

Grimm's text-editions were mostly prepared in conjunction with his brother. In 1812 they published the two ancient fragments of the Hildebrandslied and the Weißenbrunner Gebet, Jacob having discovered what until then had never been suspected — namely the alliteration in these poems. However, Jacob had little taste for text editing, and, as he himself confessed, working on a critical text gave him little pleasure. He therefore left this department to others, especially Lachmann, who soon turned his brilliant critical genius, trained in the severe school of classical philology, to Old and Middle High German poetry and metre.

Both Brothers were attracted from the beginning by all national poetry, whether in the form of epics, ballads or popular tales. They published In 1816–1818 a collection of legends culled from diverse sources and published the two-volume Deutsche Sagen (German Legends). At the same time they collected all the folktales they could find, partly from the mouths of the people, partly from manuscripts and books, and published in 1812–1815 the first edition of those Kinder- und Hausmärchen (Children's and Household Tales), which has carried the name of the brothers Grimm into every household of the western world. The closely related subject of the satirical beast epic of the Middle Ages also held great charm for Jacob Grimm, and he published an edition of the Reinhart Fuchs in 1834. His first contribution to mythology was the first volume of an edition of the Eddaic songs, undertaken jointly with his brother, and was published in 1815. However, this work was not followed by any others on the subject.

The first edition of his Deutsche Mythologie (German Mythology) appeared in 1835. This work covered the whole range of the subject, attempting to trace the mythology and superstitions of the old Teutons back to the very dawn of direct evidence, and following their evolution to modern-day popular traditions, tales, and expressions.

== Legal scholarship ==
Grimm's work as a jurist was influential for the development of the history of law, particularly in Northern Europe.

His essay Von der Poesie im Recht (Poetry in Law, 1816) developed a far-reaching, suprapositivist Romantic conception of law. The Deutsche Rechtsalterthümer (German Legal Antiquities, 1828) was a comprehensive compilation of sources of law from all Germanic languages, whose structure allowed an initial understanding of older German legal traditions not influenced by Roman law. Grimm's Weisthümer (4 vol., 1840–63), a compilation of partially oral legal traditions from rural Germany, allows research of the development of written law in Northern Europe.

== Politics ==
Jacob Grimm MdFN

Member of the Frankfurt Parliament for Kreis Duisburg
- In office 24 May 1848 – 2 October 1848 (Note: leave of absence from 5 September 1848 to 2 October 1848)
- Preceded by: Constituency established
- Succeeded by: Carl Schorn

Personal details
- Party: Casino

Jacob Grimm's work tied in strongly with his views on Germany and its culture. His work on both fairy tales and philology dealt with the country's origins. He wished for a united Germany, and, like his brother, supported the Liberal movement for a constitutional monarchy and civil liberties, as demonstrated by their involvement in the Göttingen Seven protest. In the German revolution of 1848, he was elected to the Frankfurt National Parliament. The people of Germany had demanded a constitution, so the Parliament, formed of elected members from various German states, met to form one. Grimm was selected for the office largely because of his part in the University of Göttingen's refusal to swear to the king of Hanover. In Frankfurt, he made some speeches and was adamant that the Danish-ruled but German-speaking duchy of Holstein be under German control. Grimm soon became disillusioned with the National Assembly and asked to be released from his duties to return to his studies.

He was elected to the American Philosophical Society in 1863.

== Death ==
Jacob Grimm died on 20 September 1863, in Berlin, Germany from disease, at the age of 78.

== Works ==
The following is a complete list of Grimm's separately published works. Those he published with his brother are marked with a star (*). For a list of his essays in periodicals, etc., see vol. V of his Kleinere Schriften, from which the present list is taken. His life is best studied in his own Selbstbiographie, in vol. I of the Kleinere Schriften. There is also a brief memoir by Karl Goedeke in Göttinger Professoren (Gotha (Perthes), 1872).

- Über den altdeutschen Meistergesang (Göttingen, 1811)
- *Kinder- und Hausmärchen (Berlin, 1812–1815) (many editions)
- *Das Lied von Hildebrand und des Weissenbrunner Gebet (Kassel, 1812)
- Altdeutsche Wälder (Kassel, Frankfurt, 1813–1816, 3 vols.)
- *Der arme Heinrich von Hartmann von der Aue (Berlin, 1815)
- Irmenstrasse und Irmensäule (Vienna, 1815)
- *Die Lieder der alten Edda (Berlin, 1815)
- Silva de romances viejos (Vienna, 1815)
- *Deutsche Sagen (Berlin, 1816–1818, 2nd ed., Berlin, 1865–1866)
- Deutsche Grammatik (Göttingen, 1819, 2nd ed., Göttingen, 1822–1840) (reprinted 1870 by Wilhelm Scherer, Berlin)
- Wuk Stephanowitsch' Kleine Serbische Grammatik, verdeutscht mit einer Vorrede (Leipzig and Berlin, 1824) Vuk Stefanovic Karadzic – Serbian Grammar
- Zur Recension der deutschen Grammatik (Kassel, 1826)
- *Irische Elfenmärchen, aus dem Englischen (Leipzig, 1826)
- Deutsche Rechtsaltertümer (Göttingen, 1828, 2nd ed., 1854)
- Hymnorum veteris ecclesiae XXVI. interpretatio theodisca (Göttingen, 1830)
- Reinhart Fuchs (Berlin, 1834)
- Deutsche Mythologie (Göttingen, 1835, 3rd ed., 1854, 2 vols.)
- Taciti Germania edidit (Göttingen, 1835)
- Über meine Entlassung (Basel, 1838)
- (together with Schmeller) Lateinische Gedichte des X. und XI. Jahrhunderts (Göttingen, 1838)
- Sendschreiben an Karl Lachmann über Reinhart Fuchs (Berlin, 1840)
- Weistümer, Th. i. (Göttingen, 1840) (continued, partly by others, in 5 parts, 1840–1869)
- Andreas und Elene (Kassel, 1840)
- Frau Aventure (Berlin, 1842)
- Geschichte der deutschen Sprache (Leipzig, 1848, 3rd ed., 1868, 2 vols.)
- Des Wort des Besitzes (Berlin, 1850)
- *Deutsches Wörterbuch, Bd. i. (Leipzig, 1854)
- Rede auf Wilhelm Grimm und Rede über das Alter (Berlin, 1868, 3rd ad., 1865)
- Kleinere Schriften (F. Dümmler, Berlin, 1864–1884, 7 vols.).
  - vol. 1 : Reden und Abhandlungen (1864, 2nd ed. 1879)
  - vol. 2 : Abhandlungen zur Mythologie und Sittenkunde (1865)
  - vol. 3 : Abhandlungen zur Litteratur und Grammatik (1866)
  - vol. 4 : Recensionen und vermischte Aufsätze, part I (1869)
  - vol. 5 : Recensionen und vermischte Aufsätze, part II (1871)
  - vol. 6 : Recensionen und vermischte Aufsätze, part III
  - vol. 7 : Recensionen und vermischte Aufsätze, part IV (1884)
