= Teutonic Mythology =

Teutonic Mythology may refer to:

- Germanic paganism
- Jacob Grimm's Deutsche Mythologie (1835)
- Viktor Rydberg's Undersökningar i germanisk mythologi I (1886)
