= Herman Grimm =

German academic and writer (1828–1901)

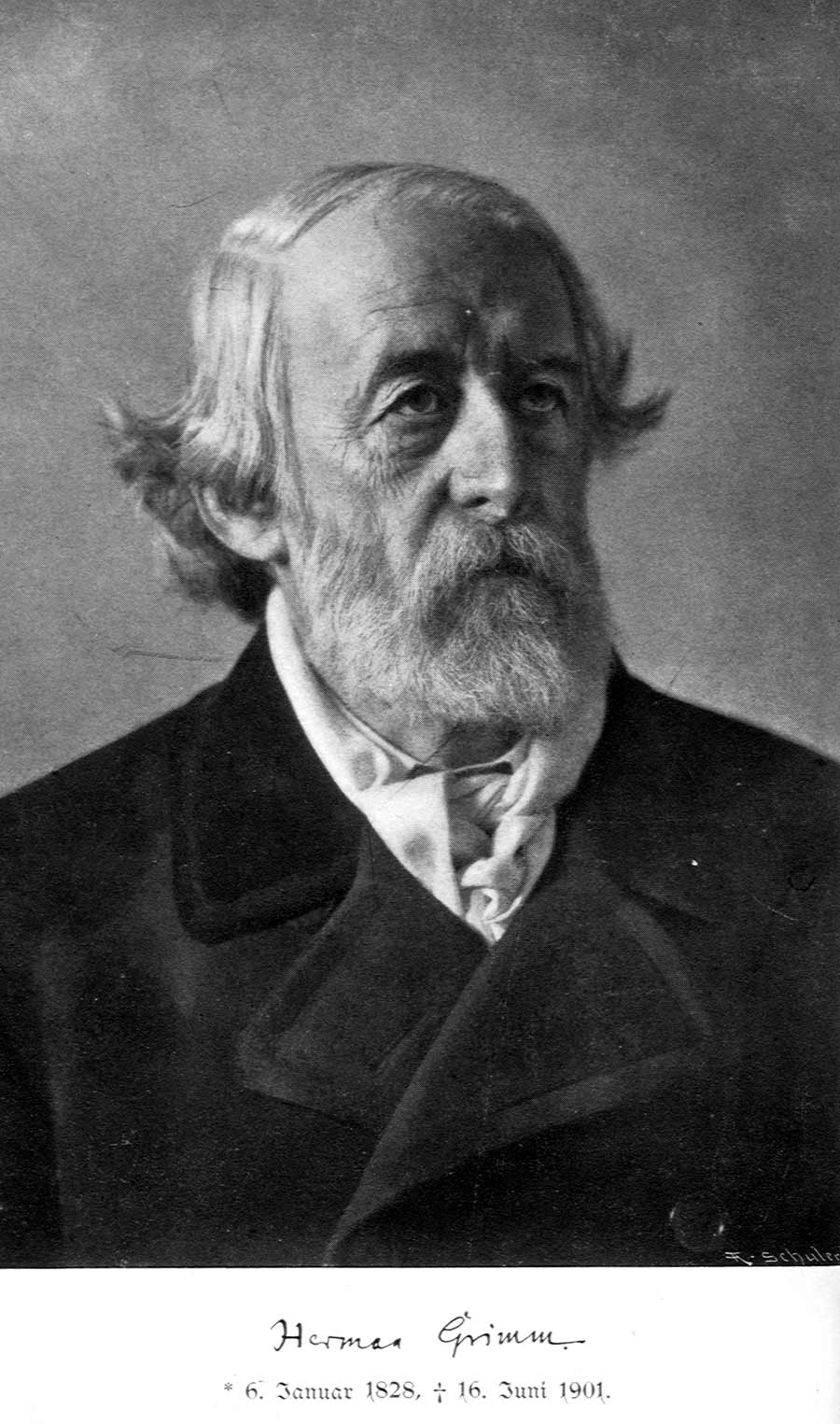
- Born: 6 January 1828; Kassel, Electorate of Hesse, German Confederation
- Died: 16 June 1901 (aged 73); Berlin, Kingdom of Prussia, German Empire
- Spouse: Gisela von Arnim (m. 1859)
- Father: Wilhelm Grimm
- Relatives: Jakob Grimm (uncle); Ludwig Emil Grimm (uncle)

Herman Grimm (6 January 1828 – 16 June 1901) was a German academic and writer.

== Family and education ==
Grimm's father was Wilhelm Grimm (1786–1859), and his uncle was Jakob Grimm (1785–1863); both were philologist compilers of indigenous folk tales ("Brothers Grimm"). His other uncle was the painter engraver Ludwig Emil Grimm (1790–1863). Herman Grimm is believed to have had only one (known) child at a young age, Martin Grimm. From 1841 Herman attended the Friedrich Wilhelm Gymnasium in Berlin. He belonged to a clique associated with Bettina von Arnim (1785–1859), wife of the late poet Achim von Arnim (1781–1831), and started publishing drama and novels. He began legal and philological studies at the universities of Berlin and Bonn.

== Career ==
In 1857 he visited Rome where the artistic circle of Peter von Cornelius brought his interests to art. In 1859, he married Gisela von Arnim (1827–1889), the Arnim's daughter, and published his treatise, Die Akademie der Künste und das Verhältniß der Künstler zum Staate. His short-lived periodical, Über Künstler und Kunstwerke (1864–1867), published many important essays. It also contained some of the first photographic illustrations of art in a magazine. The first volume of his biography of Michelangelo, Das Leben Michelangelos, began appearing in 1868. He wrote his dissertation in 1868 from Leipzig and his habilitation (1870) in Berlin. In 1871 he weighed in on the Hans Holbein "Meyer Madonna" debate concluding against the sound reasoning of the "Holbein convention" of eminent scholars, that the Dresden version was the autograph one.

He accepted the chair in the newly created discipline of History of Art (Lehrstuhl für Kunstgeschichte) in Berlin in 1872 and remained there the rest of his life. Grimm published the first (though incomplete) edition of his Das Leben Raphaels in 1872. Grimm's art history writing is characteristic of the period consolidation of standards following the unification of Germany, known as the Gründerzeit. When Friedrich Waagen, for example, criticized in the early issues of the Zeitschrift für bildende Kunst, Goethe's aesthetic taste of some fifty years before, Grimm, the spokesman for the Gründerzeit, took it personally, refuting Waagen effectively point by point. Grimm's Beiträge zur deutschen Culturgeschichte, essays about important cultural personalities, appeared in 1897. Throughout his life his biographies passed through numerous editions. At his death he was succeeded by Heinrich Wölfflin. His students included Alfred Lichtwark; Julius Meier-Graefe studied under him but did not receive a degree.

== Reputation ==
Grimm's reputation is that of the arch-Romantic, Gründerzeit art historian. He viewed himself as the intellectual successor of Goethe. His approach to art history was through the "Great Masters", and arranging significance of art through a biographical account of art history. His tastes both typified and led German and continental bourgeois taste. Homer, Dante and Shakespeare were the great writers of their age; in art, only Raphael and Michelangelo could compare. The nineteenth century's adoration of Raphael is in large part Grimm's doing. Wölfflin wrote that Grimm showed indifference to all but the very great. This approach to art history is shared by other historians of his time, including Carl Justi, but was personally savaged in the lectures of Anton Springer. Grimm was one of the first to carefully study reception theory, though this aspect of his work is seldom considered. In the 3rd edition of his life of Raphael (1896) he added a section on Rezeptionsgeschichte. Perhaps because formal analysis and the sanctity of viewing the original work of art mattered so little to him, he was among the first to use lantern slides (reproductive images) in his lectures. Grimm's writings were gradually supplanted by superior scholarship in the twentieth century. His emotional approach to art-historical debate, as evidenced by the Holbein Madonna incident, proved his allegiances were usually closer to nationalism than art history. In Germany, his concept of the [German] hero as a mover of history was embraced by the Nazis, who saw to it that new and repackaged versions of his writings, such as Vom Geist der Deutschen (1943), appeared up until the war's end.

== Sources ==
- Bazin, Germain. Histoire de l'histoire de l'art: de Vasari à nos jours. Paris: Albin Michel, 1986, pp. 158, 530–531
- Dilly, Heinrich. Kunstgeschichte als Institution: Studien zur Geschichte einer Diziplin. Frankfurt am Main: Suhrkamp, 1979, p. 41 mentioned
- Kultermann, Udo. The History of Art History. New York: Abaris, 1993, pp. 126–27, 147
- Metzler Kunsthistoriker Lexikon: zweihundert Porträts deutschsprachiger Autoren aus vier Jahrhunderten. Stuttgart: Metzler, 1999, pp. 130–133
- Schlink, Wilhelm. "Herman Grimm (1828–1901): Epigone und Vorläufer." In Osinski, Jutta and Saure, Felix, eds. Aspekte der Romantik: zur Verleihung des „Brüder Grimm-Preises“ der Philipps-Universität Marburg im Dezember 1999. Kassel: Brüder-Grimm-Gesellschaft, 2001 pp. 73–93.
- Schuchhardt, Wolfgang, ed. Vom Geist der Deutschen, Gedanken von Herman Grimm: ein Brevier. Berlin: F. A. Herbig, 1943
- Wölfflin, Heinrich. Heinrich Wölfflin, 1864–1945: Autobiographie, Tagebücher und Briefe. Joseph Ganter, ed. 2nd ed. Basel: Schwabe & Co., 1984, p. 492

== Bibliography ==
- Die Cartons von Peter von Cornelius in den Sälen der Königl. Akademie der Künste zu Berlin. Berlin: Hertz, 1859
- Leben Michelangelo's. 2 vols. Hanover: Carl Rümpler, 1860–1863 [and Berlin: Gustav Schade], English, Life of Michael Angelo. Boston: Little, Brown, 1865
- "Ist die moderne Kunstgeschichte eine auf solider Grundlage ruhende Wissenschaft? Gründe warum nicht. Notwendigkeit einer änderung." In Über Künstler und Kunstwerke 1 (1864): 4–8
- Die Venus von Milo. Rafael und Michel Angelo: Zwei Essays von Herman Grimm. Boston: De Vries, Ibarra & Co., 1864, partially translated into English, The Venus de Milo. Boston: J. J. Hawes, 1868, collected and republished as, Zehn ausgewählte Essays zur Einführung in das Studium der Neuern Kunst. Berlin: Dümmler, 1871
- Über Künstler und Kunstwerke. 2 vols. Berlin: F. Dümmler's Verlagsbuchhandlung, 1865–1867
- Albrecht Dürer. Berlin: C. G. Lüderitz, 1866
- [Meyer Madonna opinion] "Die Holbein'sche Madonna." Preussische Jahrbücher 28 (1871): 418–31
- Das Leben Raphaels von Urbino: italienischer Text von Vasari übersetzt und Commentar. Berlin: F. Dümmler, 1872, [first complete edition, 2nd, 1886, 3rd ed., 1896 contains the chapter on Rezeptionsgeschichte of Raphael], English, The Life of Raphael. Boston: Cupples and Hurd, 1888
- The Destruction of Rome: a Letter. Boston: Cupples, Upham, 1886
- Beiträge zur deutschen Culturgeschichte. Berlin: W. Herts, 1897
- Fragmente. Berlin: W. Spemann, 1900
