= Anton Heinrich Springer =

German art historian and writer

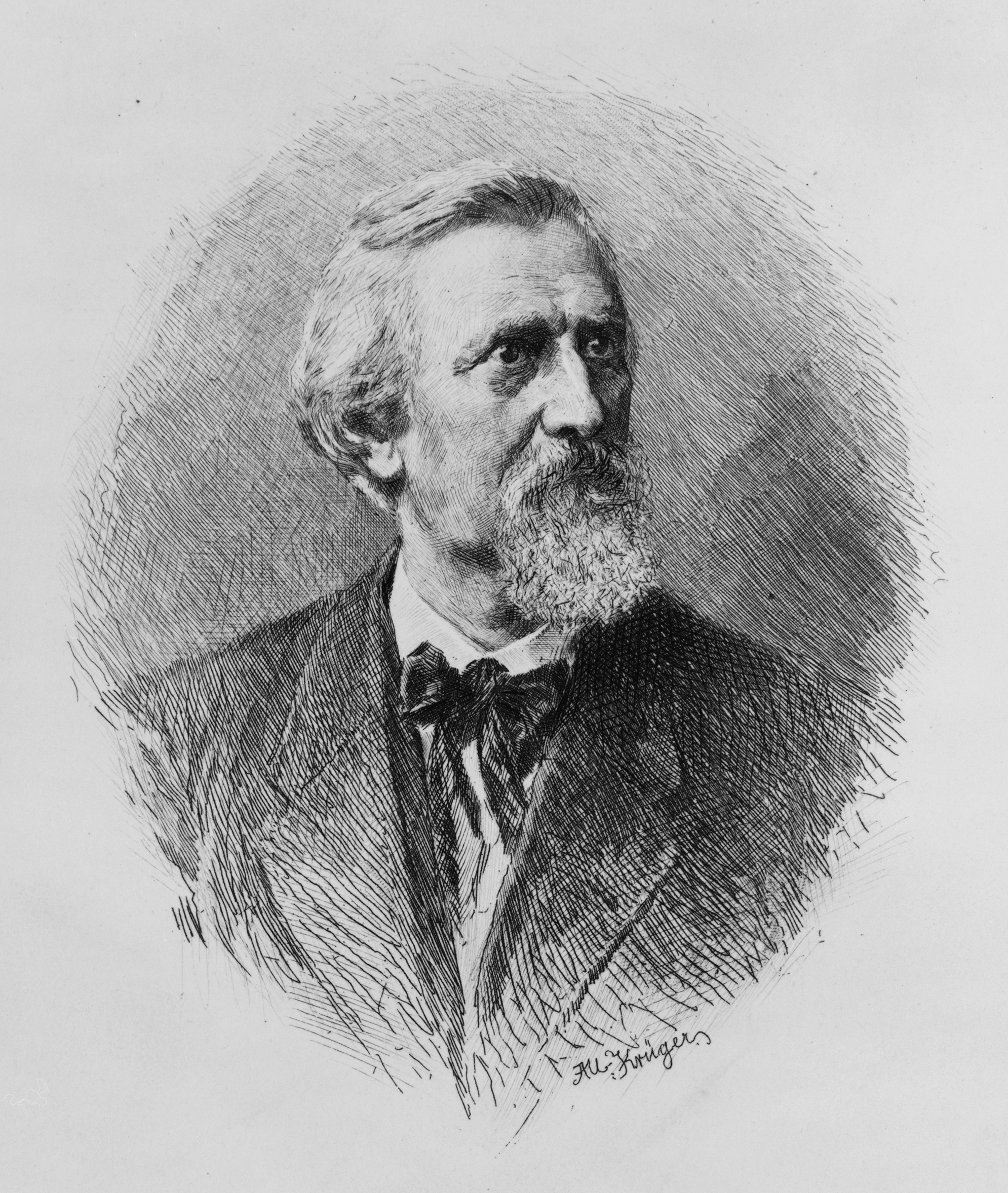
Anton Heinrich Springer

Anton Heinrich Springer (13 July 1825 – 31 May 1891) was a German art historian and writer.

== Early life ==
Springer was born in Prague, where he studied philosophy and history at Charles University, earning a Ph.D. Taking an interest in art, he made several educational journeys, travelling to Munich, Dresden and Berlin, and spent some months in Italy. After his Ph.D. he addressed himself to art history. He wrote a second Ph.D. thesis on Hegel's theory of history in Tübingen, where he also was involved in the political activities of the Revolution of 1848.

== Work ==
He settled at Tübingen, but in 1848 returned to Prague and began to lecture at the university on the history of the revolutionary epoch. The liberal tone of these lectures brought him into disfavour with the ruling authorities, and in 1849 he left Bohemia and passed some time in England, France and the Netherlands. In 1852 he settled at Bonn, where he was lecturer and professor (from 1860) for art history. In 1872 he went to the University of Strasbourg, and in 1873 to Leipzig University, where he became Professor for Medieval and Modern Art at the newly founded Institute for Art History.

As a journalist and a publicist Springer advocated the federal union of the states ruled by the Austrian emperor, and asserted the right of Prussia to the headship of Germany; during the Crimean War he favored the emancipation of the small states in southeast Europe from Turkish supremacy. After many years of feeble health, he died at Leipzig on 31 May 1891.

A fiery personality, he disparaged the art historian Herman Grimm, whom, according to Kessler, he attacked from the lectern as a writer of dime novels for wealthy readers. Likewise he berated the art historian Hermann Knackfuß as "Hermann Knackwurst." Jacob Burckhardt, fully cognizant of Springer's enmity toward him, reportedly gave Springer's student Gustav Pauli a rough reception when Pauli applied to study under him in Basel.

Springer played an important role in establishing art history as an academic subject. He rejected the more literary or impressionistic approaches of his colleagues like Herman Grimm or Hermann Knackfuß. Among his own works are several treatises on occidental art: a Compendium on the Architecture of the Christian Middle Ages (1854), a Handbook on Art History (1855), a History of Fine Arts in the 19th Century (1858), Iconographical Studies (1860), a work on Contemporary Fine Arts (1875), books on Raphael and Michelangelo (1878) and (posthumously) a book on Albrecht Dürer (1892).

== Bibliography ==
His historical works include his Geschichte Österreichs seit dem Wiener Frieden (Leipzig, 1863–1865), which was translated into Czech (Prague, 1867), as well as: Geschichte des Revolutionszeitalters (Prague, 1849); Österreich nach der Revolution (Prague, 1850); Österreich, Preussen und Deutschland (Prague, 1851); Paris im 18. Jahrhundert (Leipzig, 1856); and Protokolle des Verfassungs-Ausschusses im Oesterreichischen Reichstage 1848–1849 (Leipzig, 1885).

His principal works on art are: Leitfaden der Baukunst des christlichen Mittelalters (Bonn, 1854); the valuable Handbuch der Kunstgeschichte (7th ed., Leipzig, 1906), a revised edition of his Grundzüge der Kunstgeschichte (Leipzig, 1887–1888); Geschichte der bildenden Künste im 14. Jahrhundert (Leipzig, 1858); Bilder aus der neueren Kunstgeschichte (Bonn 1867, and again 1886); Raffael und Michelangelo (Leipzig, 1877 and 1885); and Die Kunst des 14. Jahrhunderts (Leipzig 1880–1881). Springer wrote two biographies: Friedrich Christoph Dahlmann (Leipzig, 1870–1872), and Albrecht Dürer (Berlin, 1892); and was responsible for the German edition of Crowe and Cavalcaselle's Lives of the Early Flemish Painters, which was published at Leipzig in 1875. His book of reminiscences, Aus meinem Leben (Berlin, 1892), containing contributions by Gustav Freytag and Hubert Janitschek, was edited by his son Jaro Springer (born 1856), who is also known as a writer on art.
