= Wilhelm Eduard Albrecht =

German jurist, one of the Göttingen Seven

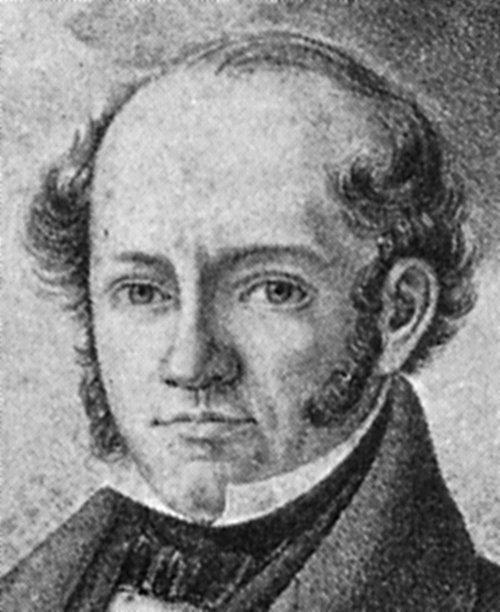
Wilhelm Eduard Albrecht

Wilhelm Eduard Albrecht (4 March 1800 – 22 May 1876) was a German constitutional lawyer, jurist, and docent. Albrecht was most notable as a member of the Göttingen Seven, a group of academics who in 1837 protested against the abrogation of the constitution of the Kingdom of Hanover by King Ernest Augustus.

== Career ==
Albrecht was born in Elbing (Elbląg), West Prussia, and studied at the Humboldt University of Berlin, the University of Göttingen, and the University of Königsberg. He taught jurisprudence in Königsberg in 1829, relocating to Göttingen the following year. After his association with the Göttingen Seven in 1837, which resulted in his dismissal, he found work as a freelance lecturer at the University of Leipzig. Here, in 1840, he became a professor of law.

When the King of Hanover Ernest Augustus declared in 1837 that he did not feel bound by Hanover's constitution, Friedrich Christoph Dahlmann tried to persuade the University of Göttingen to oppose the king's stance on the validity of a constitution. Dahlmann drafted a protestation, which was signed by the Göttingen Seven including Albrecht. A revolt from parts of the liberal bourgeoisie against the king was thwarted, but journalists documented events and a public sensation was stirred throughout Germany and Europe. The seven professors swore their oath on the constitution and so provided the prerequisite for the Revolution of 1848.

In 1847 Albrecht joined the Lübeck chapter of the Germanistentage. In 1848, during the 1848 March Revolution, Albrecht was a member of the Frankfurt Parliament and a delegate to the Siebzehnerausschuss, whose constitution he prepared. From 18 May to 17 August he represented Hamburg-Harburg in the Frankfurt Parliament, where he allied himself with the Casino faction. In 1863 Albrecht was appointed to the Geheim Hofrat (approx. "Secret Advisory Council"), shortly before his retirement in 1868.

Albrecht remains a significant figure in jurisprudence for his conception of the state as a purely theoretical legal entity, a view he developed in an 1837 review of Romeo Maurenbrecher's "Grundsätze des heutigen Staatsrechts". This view stands in opposition to the old Germanic concept of the state as Verbandsperson, a collective person, a position defended by Otto von Gierke.

His father in law was the astronomer Christian Ludwig Ideler.
