= Gisela von Arnim =

German writer (1827–1889)

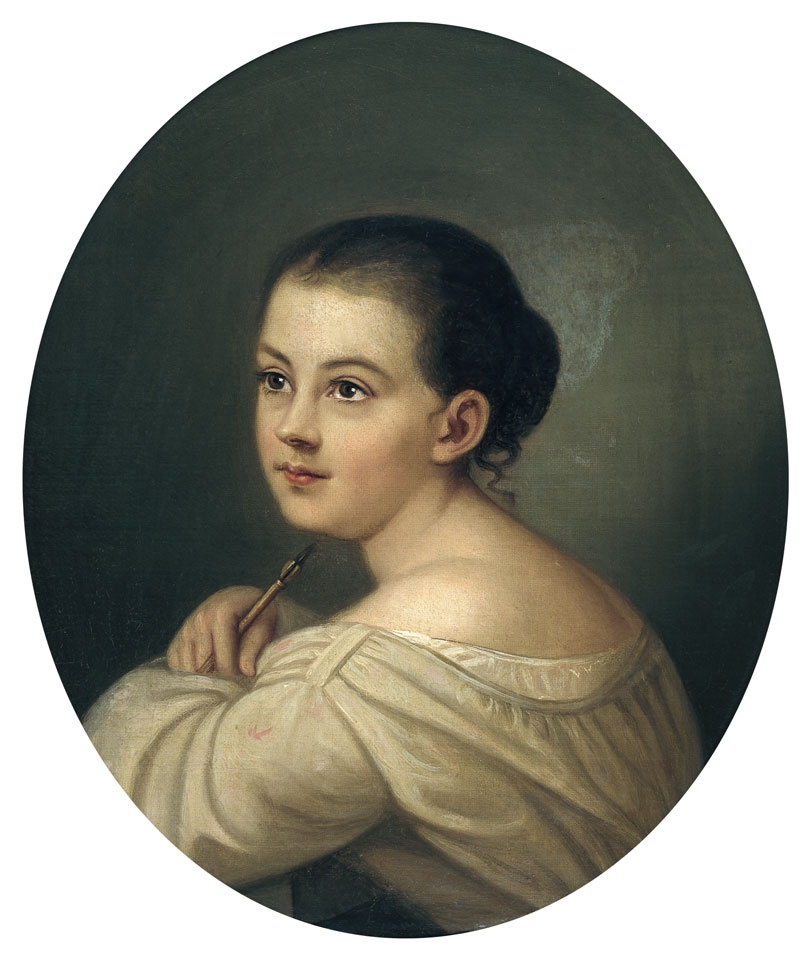
- Portrait of von Arnim by Caroline Bardua (1840)
- Born: August 30, 1827; Berlin, Kingdom of Prussia, German Confederation
- Died: April 4, 1889 (aged 61); Florence, Tuscany, Kingdom of Italy
- Spouse: Herman Grimm (m. 1859)
- Parents: Achim von Arnim (father); Bettina von Arnim (mother)
- Relatives: Clemens Brentano (uncle); Sophie von La Roche (great-grandmother)

Gisela von Arnim (also Giesela; August 30, 1827 – April 4, 1889) was a German writer, mainly of fairy tales.

== Biography ==
Born into an old German noble Arnim family, Gisela was the youngest child of Achim and Bettina von Arnim. Her father died when she was four years old. Her maternal grandfather was of Italian descent, and some of his ancestors are Sophie von La Roche and Johann Philipp Stadion, Count von Warthausen.

She was not formally educated, being taught only by her sisters. In her youth she read fairy tales and Romantic poetry, especially the works of Wilhelm Hauff, and began to write fairy tales herself. With her sisters she started the "Kaffeter circle", first a group for young women and later a full literary salon also including men (honorary members included Hans Christian Andersen and Emmanuel Geibel).

In 1849, Gisela met violinist and composer Joseph Joachim, (born in 1831), in Weimar. A painful relationship developed and only ended after Gisela von Arnim married Herman Grimm in 1859. In 1853 she met Johannes Brahms and Joachim through their mutual acquaintances Robert and Clara Schumann. Brahms and Joachim subsequently used elements of her name via musical cryptography in some of their music. Joachim dedicated his Three Pieces for Violin and Piano (Opus 5), published in 1854, to her. Gisela von Arnim's letters to Joseph Joachim are unpublished, and are at the Freies Deutsches Hochstift, Frankfurt.

On October 24, 1859, she married the Germanist and art historian Herman Grimm, a son of Wilhelm Grimm.

== Works ==
- Das Leben der Hochgräfin Gritta von Rattenzuhausbeiuns (with Bettina von Arnim)
- Mondkönigs Tochter
- Aus den Papieren eines Spatzen
- Das Licht
- Die gelbe Haube
- Dramatische Werke (collection)
- Drei Mährchen

== See also ==
- Brothers Grimm
- Marie von Olfers
