= Göttingen Seven =

Group of professors exiled for political protest

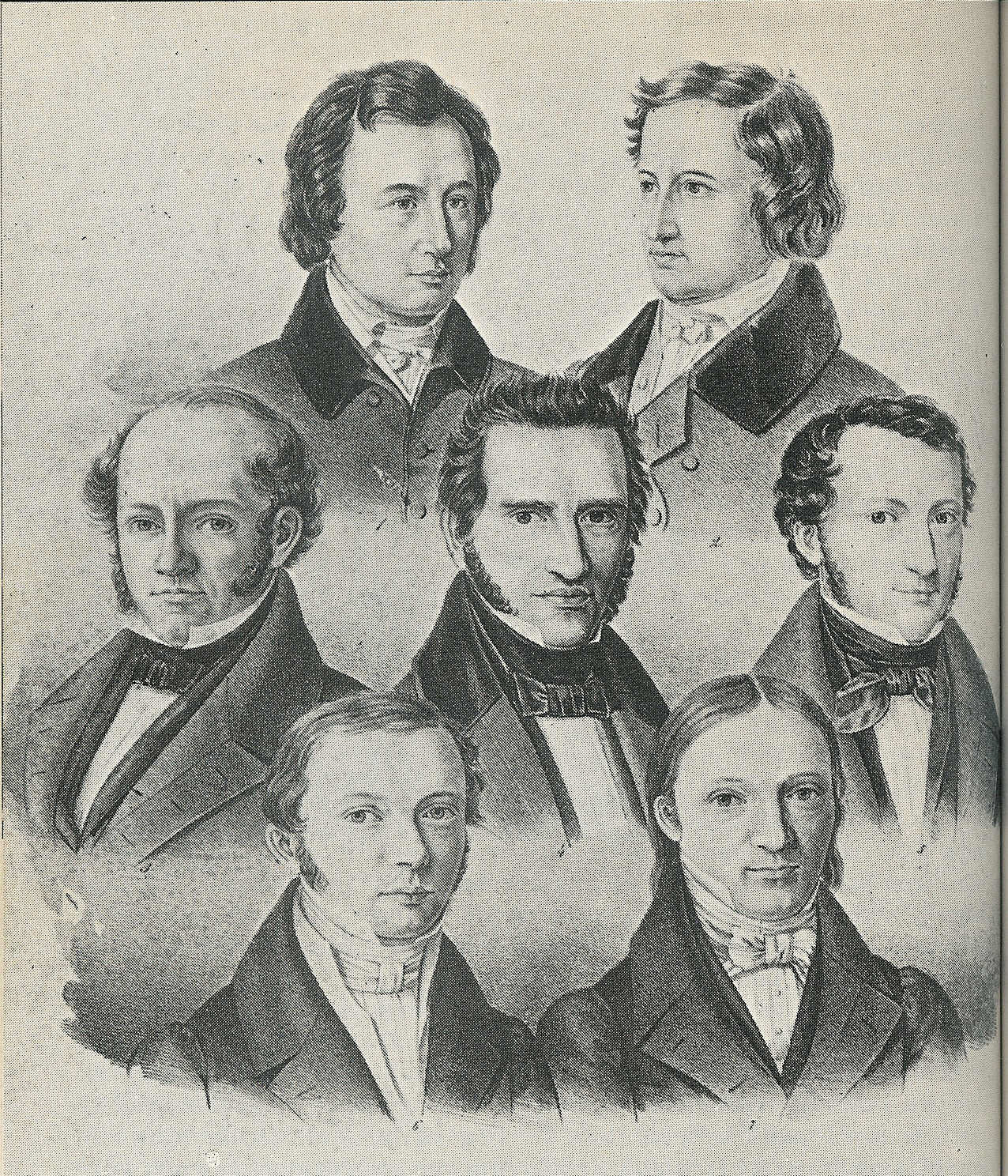
The Göttingen Seven. Top row: Wilhelm Grimm, Jacob Grimm. Middle Row: Wilhelm Eduard Albrecht, Friedrich Christoph Dahlmann, Georg Gottfried Gervinus. Bottom Row: Wilhelm Eduard Weber, Heinrich Georg August Ewald.

The Göttingen Seven (German: Göttinger Sieben) were a group of seven liberal professors at University of Göttingen. In 1837, they protested against the annulment of the constitution of the Kingdom of Hanover by its new king, Ernest Augustus, and refused to swear an oath to the king. The company of seven was led by historian Friedrich Christoph Dahlmann, who himself was one of the key advocates of the previous constitution. The other six were the Germanist brothers Wilhelm and Jacob Grimm, famed collectors and publishers of folklore, known collectively as the Brothers Grimm; jurist Wilhelm Eduard Albrecht; historian Georg Gottfried Gervinus; physicist Wilhelm Eduard Weber; and theologian and orientalist Heinrich Georg August Ewald.

== Background ==
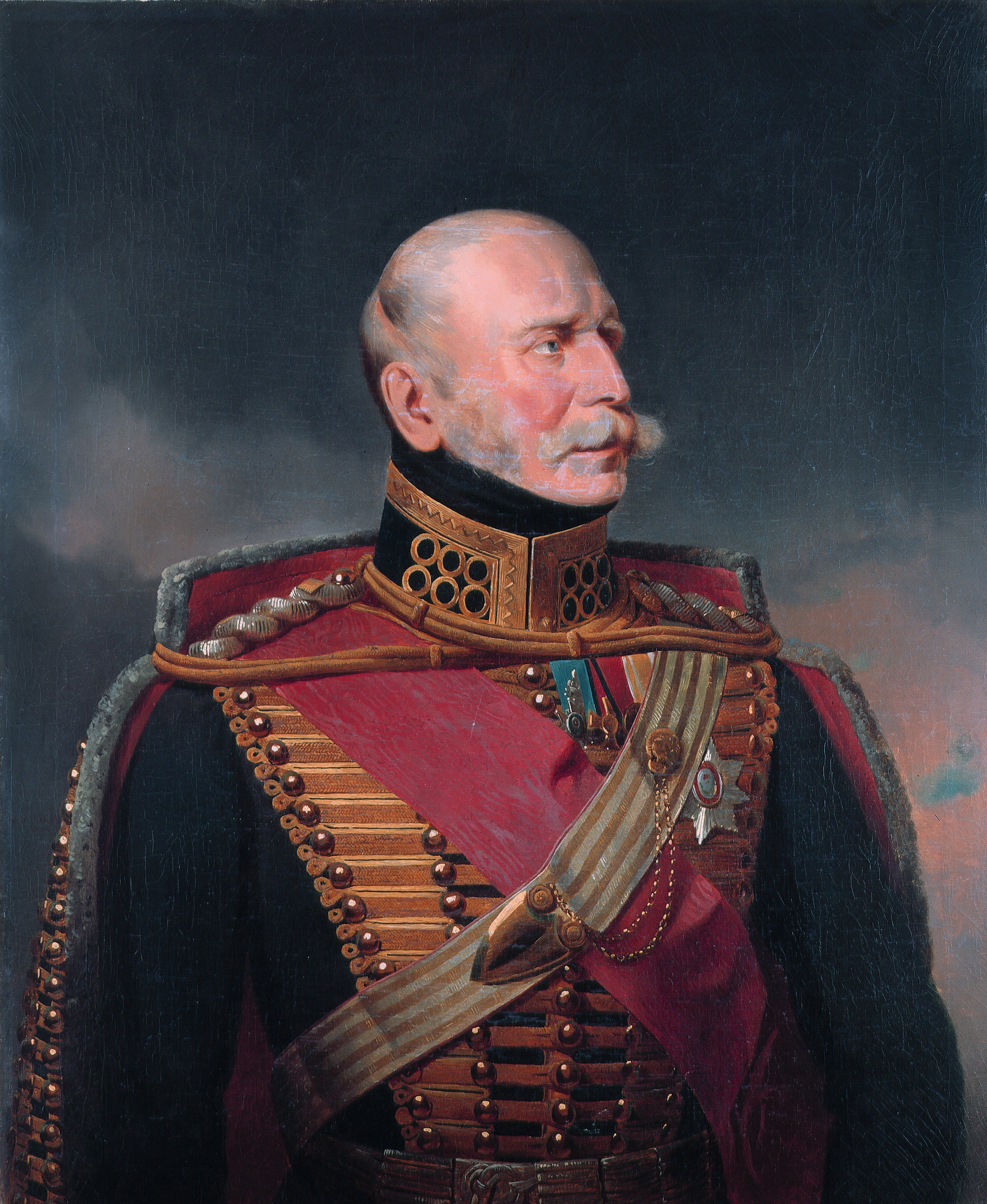
Ernest Augustus

The constitution that Ernest Augustus opposed came into effect in 1833, while he was still heir presumptive to the Hanoverian throne. Historian and politician Friedrich Christoph Dahlmann contested Ernest's plans to change the constitution to his liking, as Dahlmann himself had contributed to the constitution's framing. Additionally, Dahlmann served as the representative of the University of Göttingen, in the second chamber of the noble court.

The death of King William IV on 20 June 1837 had a great impact on Hanover's political positioning, relations, and union with the group of constitutional states in the German Confederation. With William's death, the personal union ended between Hanover and the United Kingdom, and William's brother (Ernest Augustus) took over as ruler of the kingdom of Hanover. Their niece Victoria acceded to the throne of the United Kingdom, but could not inherit Hanover due to the provision of Salic Law in force in Hanover, which barred females from ruling.

About one month after he succeeded to the throne, King Ernest addressed the matter of the Constitution. He stated that he was not bound by it, as his consent had not been asked to it. He also indicated that it would have been different, or perhaps even non-existent, had he been in power at the time of its composition. He declared that it was his aim and ambition to make the necessary changes to the constitution and rewrite it to reflect his values.

Hearing this, Dahlmann made an attempt to persuade his colleagues at the University of Göttingen senate to disapprove of the king's intent to change the constitution, and take some form of action. None of his over 40 different colleagues were willing to support Dahlmann's view and possibly cause public conflict or unrest during ongoing festivities of the 100th anniversary of the University of Göttingen.

== Protest and aftermath ==
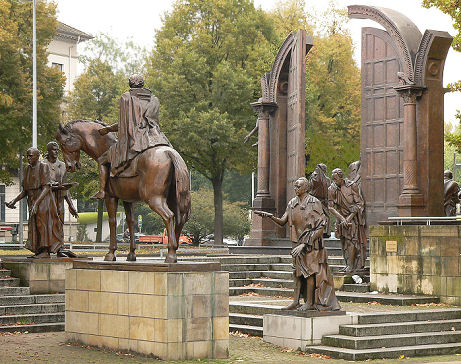
The bronze statues of the Göttingen Seven seen near to the federal state parliament in Hanover

On 1 November the same year, Ernest Augustus annulled the constitution. This move was met with political criticism from some German states. The move also provoked Dahlmann to again appeal to the university and to compose a protestation opposing Ernest's decision. This time, he received a better response: six other professors were now willing to sign in opposition. These six plus Dahlmann became known as the Göttingen Seven. Dahlmann's document was published on 18 November and it met with an explosive influence—the students at the university produced many hundreds or even thousands of copies and disseminated them across Germany.

The protest's impact forced the king to take action, and the seven defiant professors were questioned before the university court on 4 December. Ten days later, the seven were relieved of their posts at the university, and three of them (Dahlmann, Jacob Grimm, and Gervinus) were given three days to leave the country. The university viewed the dismissal as a great loss to the university, confirmed in writings about the event during the time.

The direct effects of the protest were limited, but public sensation and media interest was high in Germany and much of Europe, and the seven were popular among the general public. Each of the seven had his own personal reasons for defying the king, but the fact that they had done so was the central catalyst for the media and public attention. The efforts of the Göttingen Seven outlived each of them, and the creation of a liberal republic in Germany can in part be traced back to their protest.

== See also ==
- History of Germany § German Confederation
