= Ludwig Emil Grimm =

German painter (1790–1863)

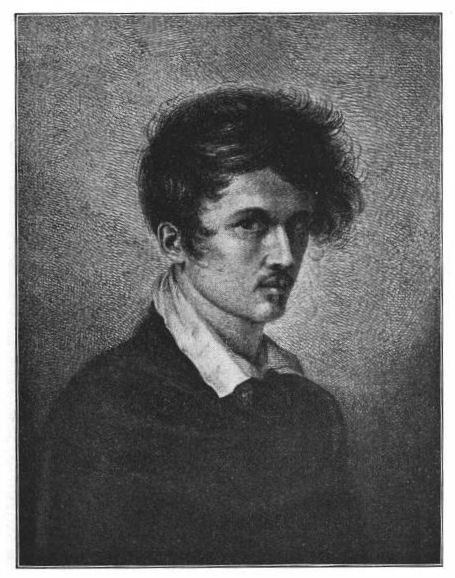
- Self-portrait (1813)
- Born: 14 March 1790; Hanau, Hesse-Kassel
- Died: 4 April 1863 (aged 73); Kassel, Electorate of Hesse
- Known for: Painter, art professor, etcher and copper engraver
- Notable work: Farmer's wife from Egern with her daughters (1813), Frontispiece to Grimm's Fairy Tales (1819), The Johannisfriedhof in Nuremberg (1828), Double portrait of Jacob and Wilhelm (1843), Marstaellerplatz in Kassel (1844)
- Parent(s): Philipp Grimm (father); Dorothea Grimm (mother)
- Relatives: Jacob Grimm (brother); Wilhelm Grimm (brother); Herman Grimm (nephew); Ludwig Hassenpflug (brother-in-law)

Ludwig Emil Grimm (14 March 1790 – 4 April 1863) was a German painter, art professor, etcher and copper engraver.

== Early life ==
Grimm was born in Hanau, in 1790. His brothers Jacob and Wilhelm Grimm were linguists, lexicographers and folklorists, famous as the Brothers Grimm.

== Education ==
Grimm's studies began at the Kunsthochschule Kassel and Philip Otto Runge, then from 1809 to 1817, he studied at Academy of Fine Arts Munich.

In the year 1814, he worked as an officer in the campaign against Napoleon.

In 1816, he travelled to Italy where he learned engraving from Carl Ernst Christoph Hess and published his first work; a sketchbook of engravings based on his Italian journey.

== Career ==
In 1819, Grimm contributed the frontispiece for the second edition of Kinder- und Hausmärchen (Grimm's Fairy Tales).

In 1823 and 1826 he was able to secure commissions for two series of portraits of scholars, professors and doctors, thanks to his brothers' connections to the academic community in Göttingen.

In 1832, he helped Gerhardt Wilhelm von Reutern found the artists' colony in Willingshausen where he became a Professor of history painting at the Kassel Academy.

In 1842, two years after his first wife's death, he married the daughter of Reform theologian Christoph Friedrich Wilhelm Ernst.

== Death ==
In 1863, he died of pneumonia in Kassel.

== Legacy ==
In 2012, the city of Hanau has awarded the "Ludwig Emil Grimm Prize" to young artists.

In 2014, a life-size bronze statue of him was dedicated there in front of the "Zum Riesen" hotel as a gift to the city from the hotel's owners, which was designed by the painter Joerg Eyfferth.

=== Writings ===
- Erinnerungen aus meinem Leben (Memoirs of My Life), edited with commentary by Adolf Stoll. Hesse & Becker, Leipzig 1911 (Digitalized).

=== Selected works ===
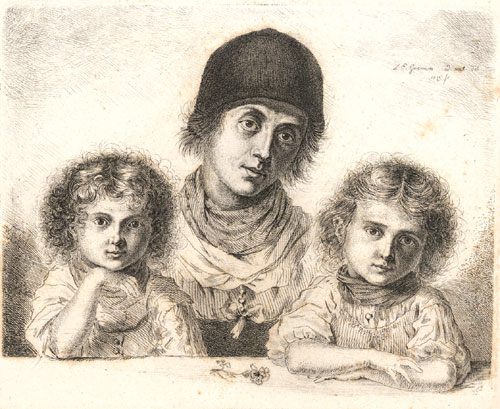
Farmer's wife from Egern with her daughters (1813)

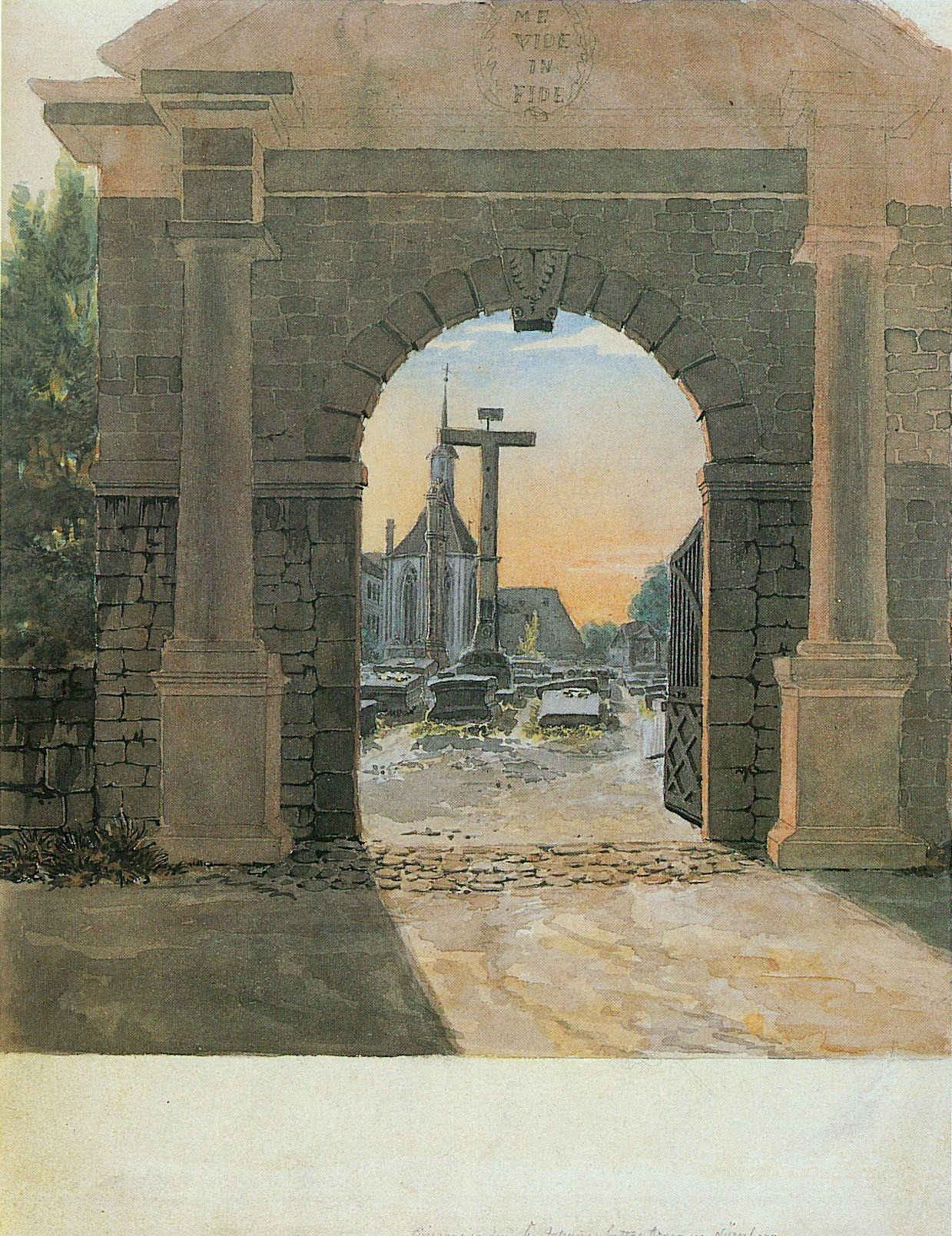
The Johannisfriedhof in Nuremberg (1828)

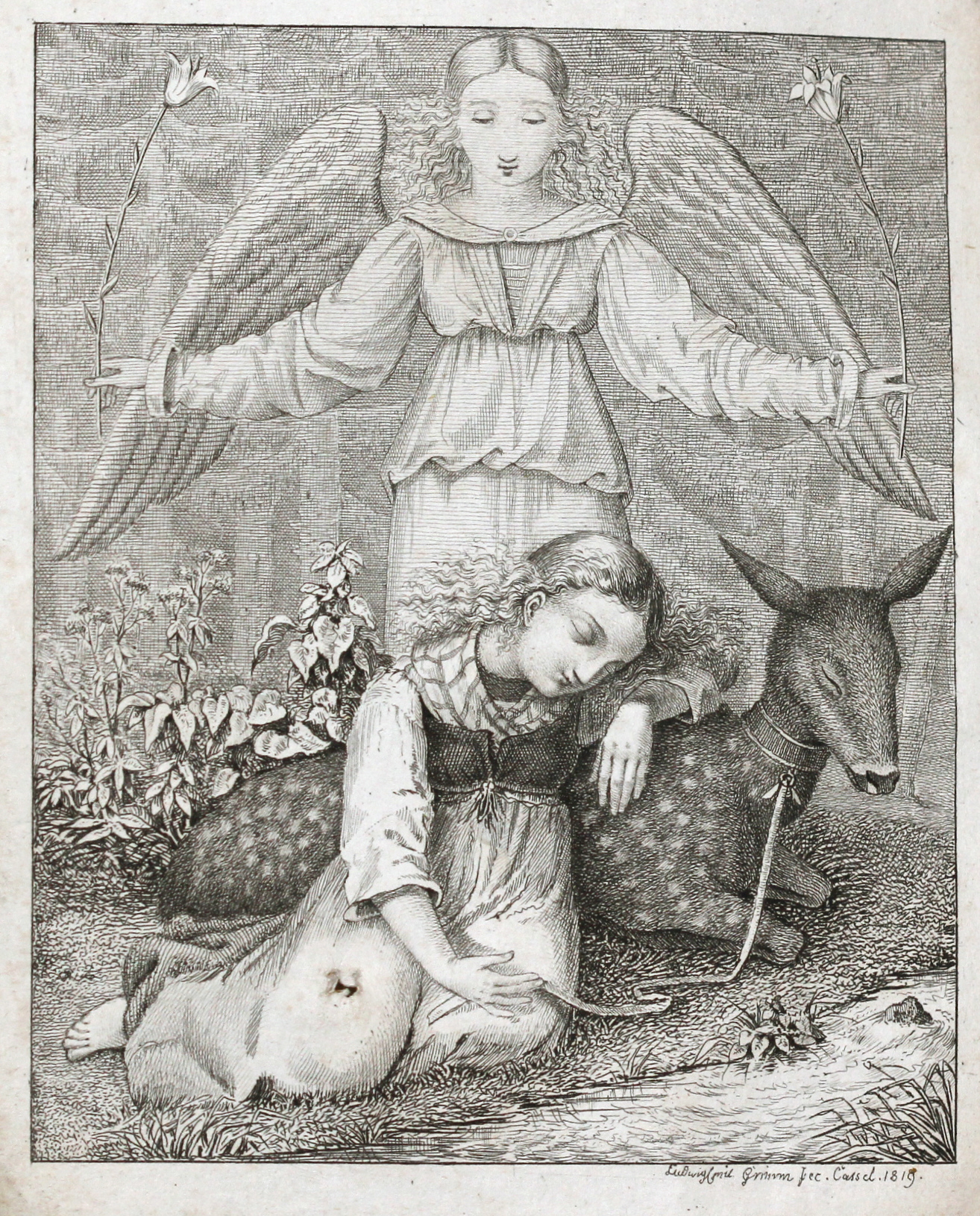
Frontispiece to Grimm's Fairy Tales (1819)

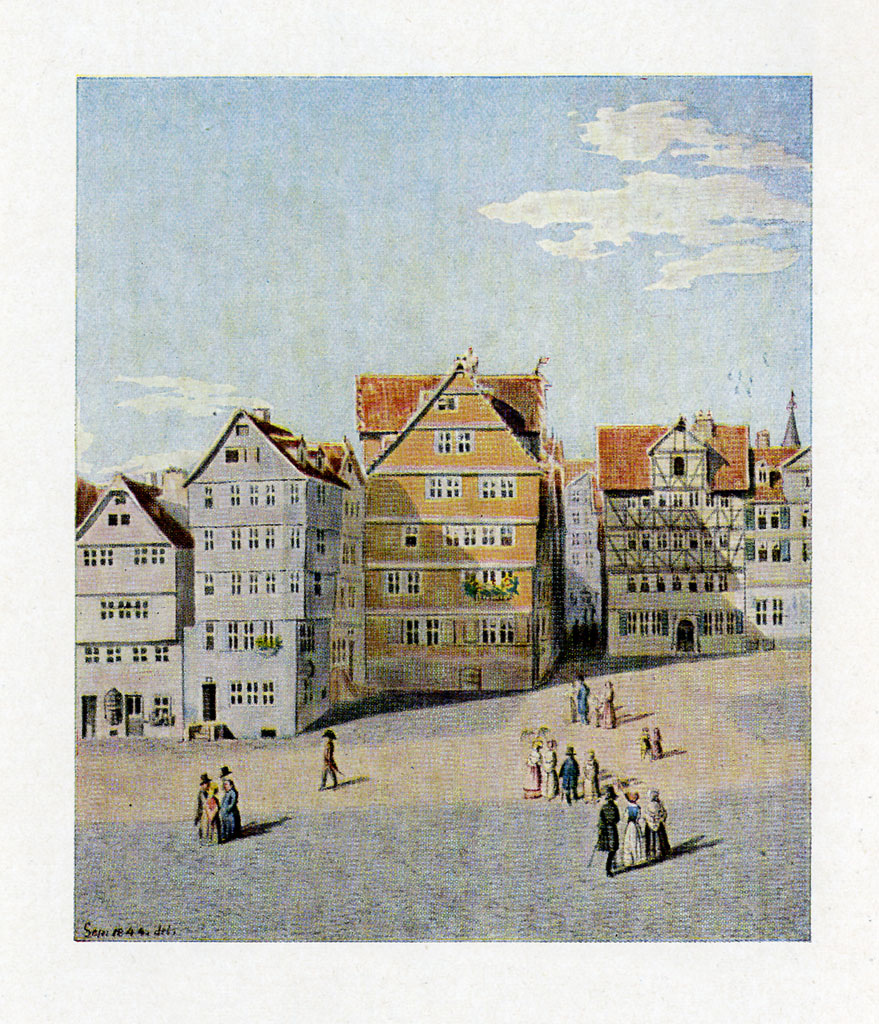
Marstaellerplatz in Kassel (1844)

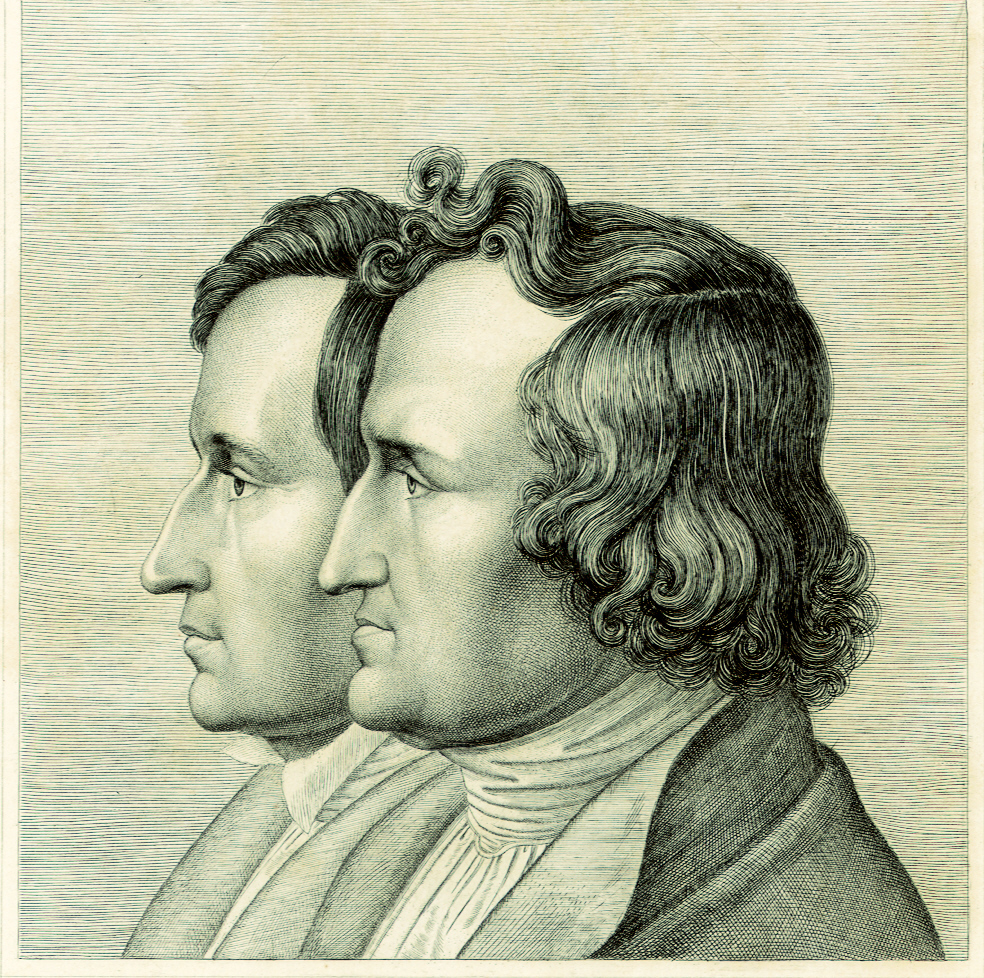
Double portrait of Jacob and Wilhelm (1843)
