= Schmeller =

Schmeller is a surname. Notable people with the surname include:

- Johann Andreas Schmeller (1785–1852), Germanist
- Johann Joseph Schmeller (1796–1841), German painter
- Alfred Schmeller (1920–1990), German-Austrian art historian, publicist
