= Deutsche Mythologie =

1835 treatise by Jacob Grimm

Deutsche Mythologie (German: [ˈdɔʏtʃə mytoloˈɡiː], Teutonic Mythology) is a treatise on Germanic mythology by Jacob Grimm. First published in Germany in 1835, the work is an exhaustive treatment of the subject, tracing the mythology and beliefs of the ancient Germanic peoples from their earliest attestations to their survivals in modern traditions, folktales and popular expressions.

== Content ==
The structure of the Deutsche Mythologie is fairly encyclopaedic. The articles and chapters are discursive of philological, historical, folkloristic, and poetic aspects of the pre-Christian Germanic religions. The sources are varied epochally and geographically. In many instances, Grimm cites the North and West Germanic variants of a religious entity; thus the entry on Thor is titled 'Donar, Thunar (Thôrr)'. Older Germanic words, particularly those concerning ritual, are often compared to Latin equivalents, as evident in the table of contents.

== Historiographical importance ==
The Deutsche Mythologie was an influential study; it has been called 'seminal, and largely unsurpassed'. Previous studies of Germanic mythology had tended to focus strictly on gods, whereas Grimm 'examined the totality of Germanic religious experience, from the creation narratives of the Prose Edda to the superstitions of the German peasant'. Grimm was not given to explicit discussions of method, but his study implies a set of 'buried theses' which were important to the development of scholarship on mythology: that the study of words as well as stories can reveal past belief-systems, and that 'just as Primitive Germanic word-forms could be "reconstructed" on a comparative basis, so could Primitive Germanic concepts, and the mythology in which they were embedded'. Grimm also assumed a 'thesis of continuity', whereby later sources could be seen as representations of earlier culture, due to the historical continuities between the two.

However, Grimm's mythological methods have also been criticised extensively. Unlike his linguistic methods for reconstructing past languages, they were unable to produce scientifically falsifiable results. His findings have been shown to have been shaped by his own political leanings: some of his claims in the Deutsche Mythologie related to his views on the proper borders of a Unified Germany and particularly the Schleswig-Holstein Question; others were shaped by his sometimes strident anti-Catholic Protestant sentiments. The Deutsche Mythologie in fact implies a range of views on social questions:

He wanted to find a mythology which would not challenge the social structures of his own day, or would even reinforce the social structures which Grimm would have liked to see. It would accordingly have an organized pantheon of gods not dissimilar to the classical pantheon, with a clear sense of hierarchy [...] It would contain an element of philosophical profundity, centering on the concept of 'Fate' [...] There would be a healthy element of diversity in it, as shown by the eventually resolved rivalry of Æsir and Vanir pantheons [...] and not too much sign of an organised priestly class — for Grimm was a Protestant [...] [G]ods and goddesses would also be respectably paired off and the latter would have strong connections with the household virtues [...] A strong element of nature-worship, especially of trees and groves, was also a desideratum.

== Editions ==
- Göttingen: Dieterich, 1835.
- 2nd ed., 2 vols. Göttingen: Dieterich, 1844.
- 3rd ed., 2 vols. Göttingen: Dieterich, 1854.
- 4th ed., curated by Elard Hugo Meyer. Berlin: F. Dümmler, 1875–1878, 3 vols.
  - 4th ed (1875), Vol. 1
  - 4th ed. (1877), Vol. 2
  - 4th ed. (1878), Vol. 3
  - Reprinted Darmstadt: Wissenschaftliche Buchgesellschaft, 1965.

=== Translations ===
The English translation by Stallybrass (3 vols., with vol. 4, supplement), is based on the fourth edition:

- Grimm, Jacob (1880). Teutonic mythology. Vol. 1. James Steven Stallybrass (tr.). W. Swan Sonnenschein & Allen.
- Grimm (1883). Teutonic mythology. Vol. 2. Stallybrass (tr.). George Bell & Sons.
- Grimm (1883). Teutonic mythology. Vol. 3. Stallybrass (tr.). George Bell & Sons.
- Grimm (1888). Teutonic mythology. Vol. 4. Stallybrass (tr.). George Bell & Sons. (Supplement)
  - Reprinted Dover Publications (1966, 2004)

== See also ==
- List of Germanic deities
