= Wilhelm Grimm =

German author (1786–1859)

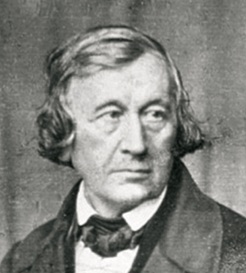
- Grimm in 1847
- Born: Wilhelm Carl Grimm; 24 February 1786; Hanau, Landgraviate of Hesse-Kassel, Holy Roman Empire
- Died: 16 December 1859 (aged 73); Berlin, Kingdom of Prussia, German Confederation
- Education: University of Marburg
- Children: Herman Grimm
- Parent(s): Philipp Grimm (father); Dorothea Grimm (mother)
- Relatives: Jacob Grimm (brother); Ludwig Emil Grimm (brother); Gisela von Arnim (daughter-in-law); Ludwig Hassenpflug (brother-in-law)

Wilhelm Carl Grimm (also Karl; (Note: The Neue Deutsche Biographie records their names as "Grimm, Jacob Ludwig Carl" and "Grimm, Wilhelm Carl". The Deutsches Biographisches Archiv records Wilhelm's name as "Grimm, Wilhelm Karl". The Allgemeine Deutsche Biographie gives the names as "Grimm: Jacob (Ludwig Karl)" and "Grimm: Wilhelm (Karl)". The National Union Catalog Pre-1956 Imprints also gives Wilhelm's name as "Grimm, Wilhelm Karl".) 24 February 1786 – 16 December 1859) was a German writer, philologist and anthropologist. He was the younger brother of Jacob Grimm, of the literary duo the Brothers Grimm.

== Life and work ==
Wilhelm was born in February 1786 in Hanau, in Hesse-Kassel. In 1803, he started studying law at the University of Marburg, one year after his brother Jacob started there. The two brothers spent their entire lives close together. In their school days, they had one bed and one table in common; as students, they had two beds and two tables in the same room. They always lived under one roof and had their books and property in common.

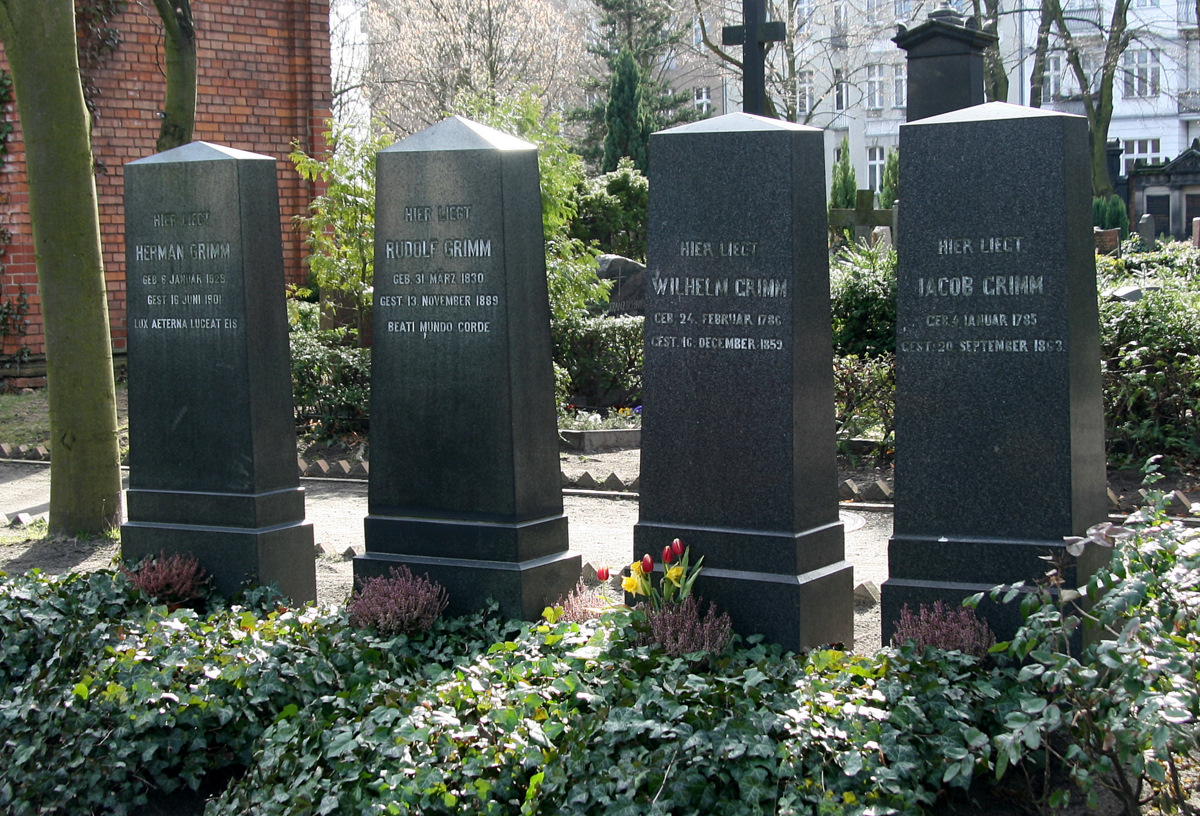
The Grimms' tomb in Berlin

In 1825, 39-year-old Wilhelm married pharmacist's daughter Henriette Dorothea Wild, also known as Dortchen. Wilhelm's marriage did not change the harmony of the brothers. Richard Cleasby visited the brothers and observed, "they both live in the same house, and in such harmony and community that one might almost imagine the children were common property."

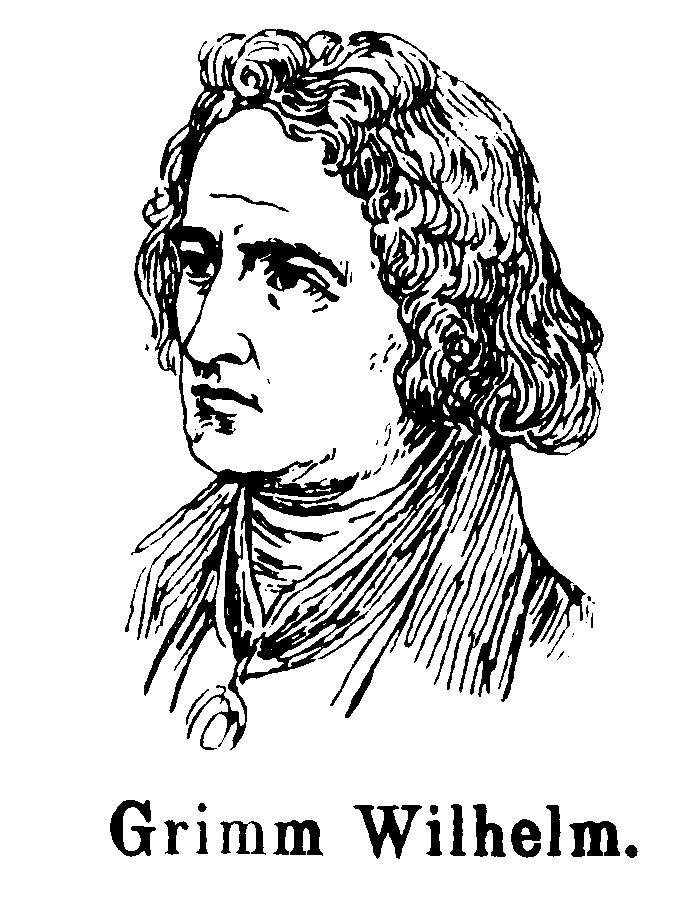
Undated engraving of Grimm

Wilhelm's character was a complete contrast to that of his brother. As a boy, he was strong and healthy, but while growing up he suffered a long and severe illness which left him weak the rest of his life. He had a less comprehensive and energetic mind than his brother, and he had less of the spirit of investigation, preferring to confine himself to some limited and definitely bounded field of work. He utilized everything that bore directly on his own studies and ignored the rest. These studies were almost always of a literary nature.

Wilhelm took great delight in music, for which his brother had but a moderate liking, and he had a remarkable gift of storytelling. Cleasby relates that "Wilhelm read a sort of farce written in the Frankfort dialect, depicting the 'malheurs' of a rich Frankfort tradesman on a holiday jaunt on Sunday. It was very droll, and he read it admirably." Cleasby describes him as "an uncommonly animated, jovial fellow." He was, accordingly, much sought in society, which he frequented much more than his brother.

A collection of fairy tales was first published in 1812 by the Grimm brothers, known in English as Grimms' Fairy Tales.

From 1837 to 1841, the Grimm brothers joined five of their colleague professors at the University of Göttingen to form a group known as the Göttinger Sieben (The Göttingen Seven). They protested against Ernest Augustus, King of Hanover, whom they accused of violating the constitution. All seven were fired by the king.

Grimm died in Berlin of an infection at the age of 73 on 16 December 1859.

== Children ==
Wilhelm and Henriette had four children together:

- Jacob (3 April 1826 – 15 December 1826)
- Herman Friedrich (6 January 1828 – 16 June 1901), also a noted writer
- Rudolf Georg (31 March 1830 – 13 November 1889)
- Barbara Auguste Luise Pauline Marie (21 August 1832 – 9 February 1919)
