= Steinau an der Straße =

- Town
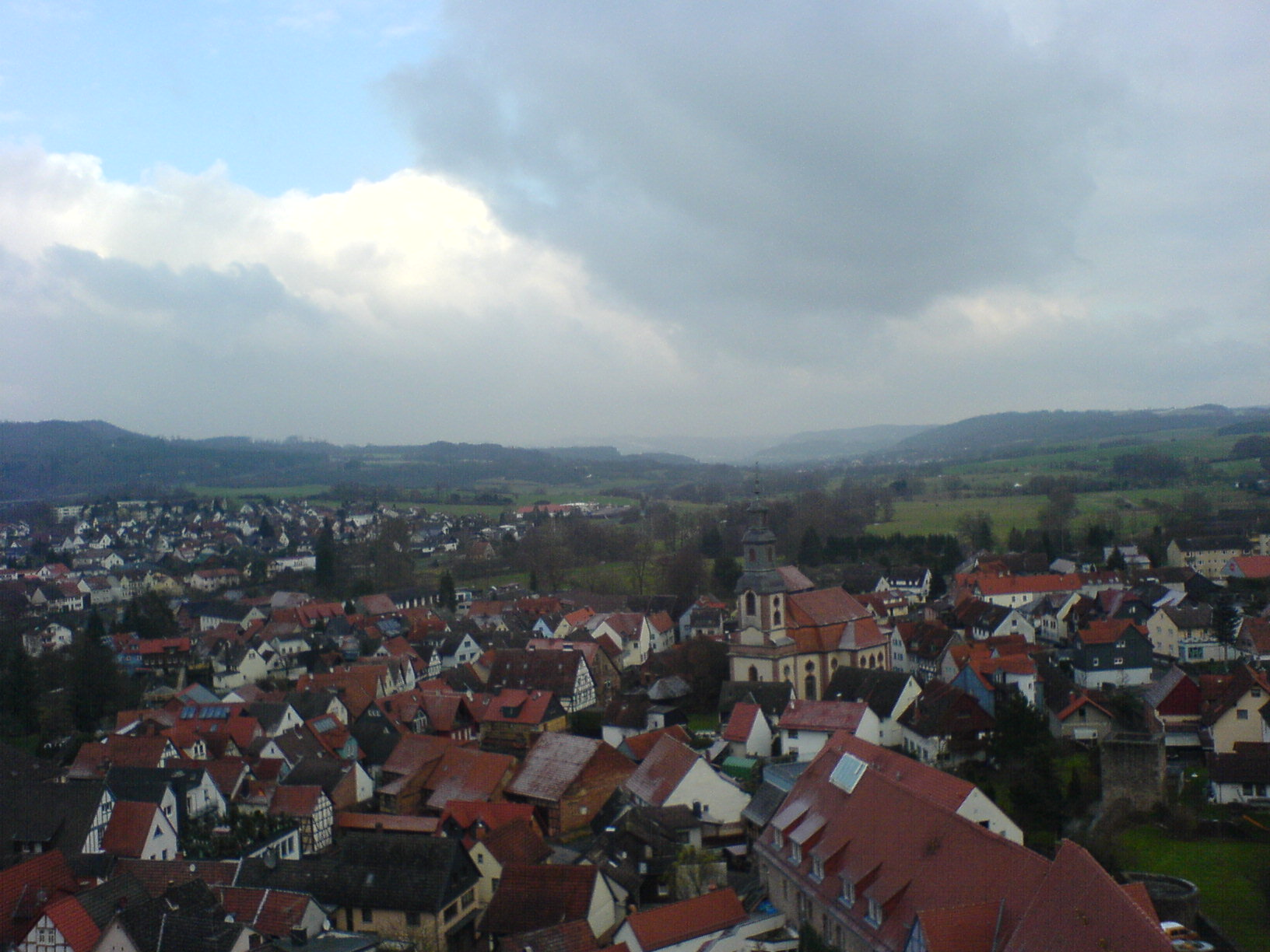

- Coat of arms

- Location of Steinau an der Straße within Main-Kinzig-Kreis district
- Interactive map of Steinau an der Straße
- Location within Germany Location within Hesse
- Coordinates: 50°19′N 09°28′E
- Country: Germany
- State: Hesse
- Admin. region: Darmstadt
- District: Main-Kinzig-Kreis
- Subdivisions: 12 districts

Government
  - Mayor (2020–26): Christian Zimmermann

Area
  - Total: 104.86 km^{2} (40.49 sq mi)
- Elevation: 174–490 m (571–1,608 ft)

Population (2025-12-31)
  - Total: 10,110
  - Density: 96.41/km^{2} (249.7/sq mi)
- Time zone: UTC+01:00 (CET)
  - Summer (DST): UTC+02:00 (CEST)
- Postal codes: 36396
- Dialling codes: 06663
- Vehicle registration: MKK
- Website: www.steinau.eu

Steinau an der Straße (German pronunciation: [ˈʃtaɪnaʊ ʔan deːɐ̯ ˈʃtʁaːsə], lit. 'Steinau on the Route') is a town of around 10,000 inhabitants in the Main-Kinzig district, in Hesse, Germany. It is situated on the river Kinzig, 32 kilometres (20 mi) southwest of Fulda. The name Steinau refers to stones in the river; an der Straße, meaning on the road, refers to the historic trade route Via Regia from Leipzig to Frankfurt on which it was located. Steinau is best known for the Brothers Grimm who spent part of their childhood here.

== Geography ==
=== Location ===
Steinau is located at an elevation of around 175 metres (574 ft) above NHN in the valley of the Kinzig river which divides the hills of the Spessart (to the south) from the Vogelsberg (to the north). The municipal territory extends into both ranges.

=== Subdivisions ===
Steinau consists of the following Stadtteile: Bellings, Hintersteinau, Klesberg, Marborn, Marjoß, Neustall, Sarrod, Rabenstein, Rebsdorf, Seidenroth, Steinau proper, Uerzell and Ulmbach.

=== Neighbouring communities ===
The neighbouring communities are from the north (clockwise): Freiensteinau, Neuhof, Flieden, Schlüchtern, the unincorporated area Gutsbezirk Spessart which completely surrounds the Stadtteil of Marjoß, Bad Soden-Salmünster and Birstein.

== Name ==
The name Steinau is probably derived from Steinaha, Alemannic for "water flowing over rocks".

== History ==
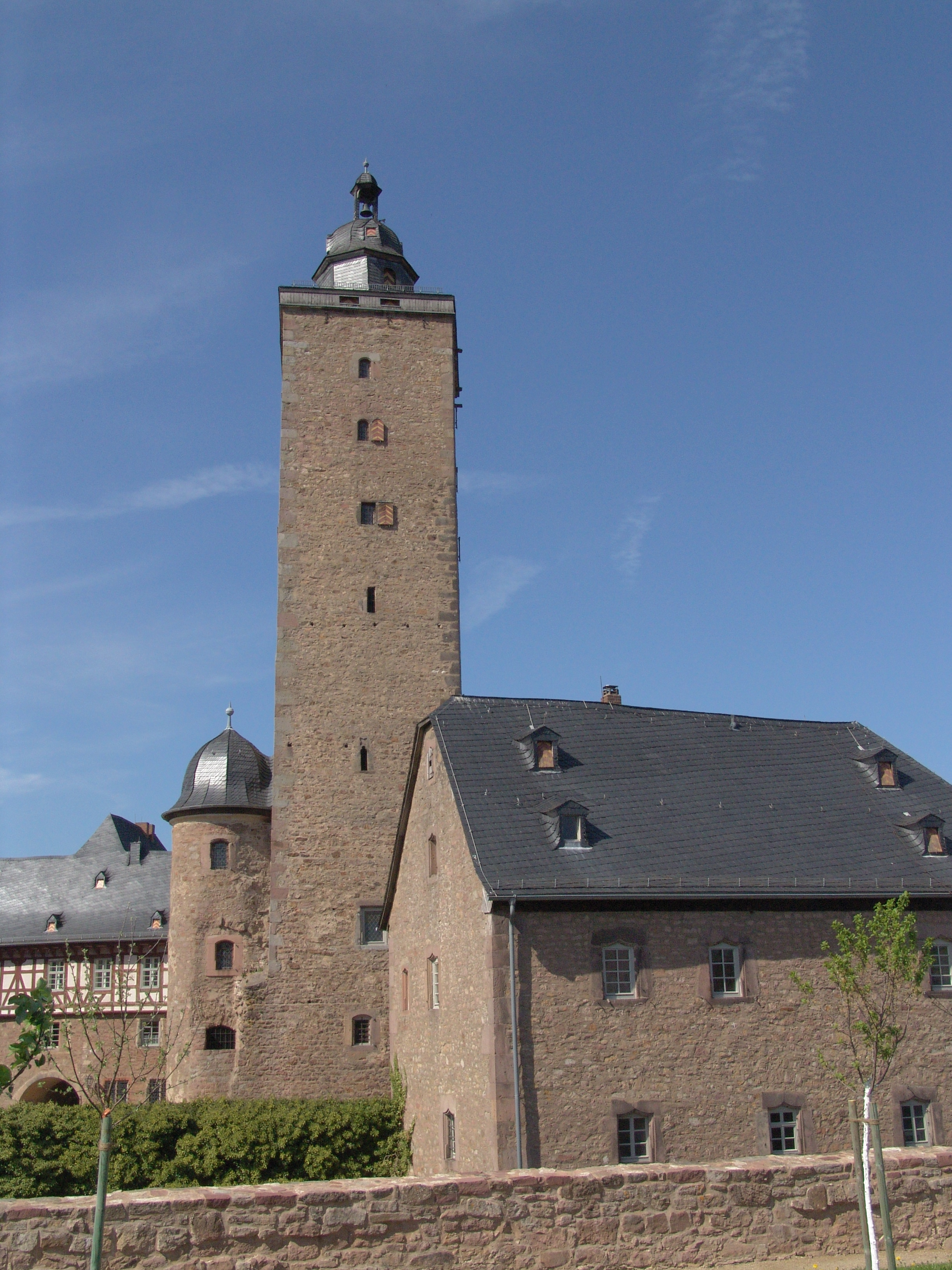
Schloss Steinau

Archaeological evidence indicates that there was a small settlement in this area in the 8th century. The first church was built in the 9th century. In the mid-13th century, St. Catherine's Church was big enough to accommodate burials on its grounds.

On 4 July 1290, Emperor Rudolf von Habsburg granted a charter awarding Steinau the status of town and permitting it to hold a weekly market. This may have been motivated in part by Steinau's position on the Via Regia connecting Frankfurt and Leipzig. This charter is considered the municipality's founding document.

The town's heyday was in the 16th century, when the town church was rebuilt in Gothic style and increased in size. In 1528-55 the castle, since the 13th century a residence of the Counts of Hanau was rebuilt as a Renaissance palace. Schloss Steinau with its 35 metres (115 ft) high bergfried remains the town's landmark. In 1561, the town hall was built, followed a year later by the Amtshaus, seat of the Amtsmann, the local representative of the ruler. Like many other towns, Steinau suffered severely during the Thirty Years' War which brought plundering, fire and the plague. Another setback followed in the 18th century during the Seven Years' War. Only in the later part of that century did an economic upturn set in.

The Brothers (Jacob and Wilhelm) Grimm, famous for their collections of fairy tales and folklore, lived in Steinau during their childhood. Their grandfather, Friedrich Grimm (1730–1777) had been a Protestant minister in Steinau, and their father, Philipp Grimm, returned to his boyhood home as Amtmann (clerk) in 1791. The family lived in his official residence (Amtshaus) until 1796, when Phillip died.

Jacob and Wilhelm went to live with their aunt in Hanau to finish their education, and the rest of the family remained in Steinau until 1805 in a house, Die Alte Kellerei, that still stands today at Brückentor. It is one of many half-timbered buildings that can be found throughout the town.

== Transport ==
Steinau lies on the Kinzig Valley Railway (Hesse) and offers hourly connections to Frankfurt and Fulda.

== Sights ==
- Schloss Steinau
- Town hall
- Amtshaus/Brüder-Grimm-Haus
- Katharinenkirche (town church)
- Märchenbrunnen (fountain)
