= Ludwig Hassenpflug =

German statesman (1794–1862)

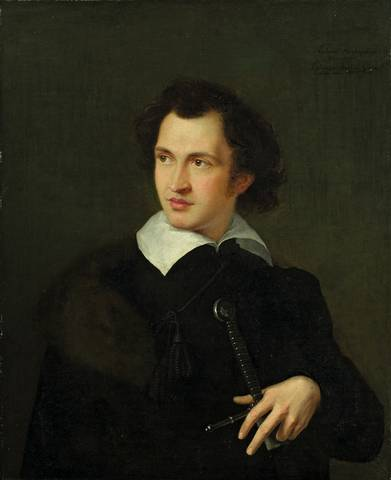
Ludwig Hassenpflug (1818), by Ludwig Emil Grimm

Hans Daniel Ludwig Friedrich Hassenpflug (26 February 1794 – 15 October 1862), German statesman, was born at Hanau in Hesse.

== Promotions ==
He studied law at Göttingen, graduated in 1816, and took his seat as Assessor in the judicial chamber of the board of government (Regierungskollegium) at Kassel, of which his father Johann Hassenpflug was also a member, in 1821 he was nominated by the new elector, William II, fustisrat (councillor of justice); in 1832 he became Ministerialrat and reporter (Referent) to the ministry of Hesse-Kassel, and in May of the same year was appointed successively minister of justice and of the interior.

It was from this moment that he became conspicuous in the constitutional struggles of Germany. The reactionary system introduced by the elector William I had broken down before the revolutionary movements of 1830, and in 1831 Hesse had received a constitution. This development was welcome neither to the elector nor to the other German governments, and Hassenpflug deliberately set to work to reverse it. In doing so he gave the lie to his own early promise; for he had been a conspicuous member of the revolutionary Burschen-schaft at Göttingen, and had taken part as a volunteer in the German Campaign of 1813.

== Reactionary position ==
It is unnecessary to enquire into the causes of the change. Hassenpfiug by training and tradition was a strait-laced official; he was also a first-rate lawyer, and his naturally arbitrary temper had from the first displayed itself in an attitude of overbearing independence towards his colleagues and even towards the elector. To such a man constitutional restrictions were intolerable, and from the moment he came into power he set to work to override them, by means of press censorship, legal quibbles, unjustifiable use of the electoral prerogatives, or frank supersession of the legislative rights of the Estates by electoral ordinances.

The story of the constitutional deadlock that resulted belongs to the history of Hesse-Kassel and Germany; so far as Hassenpflug himself was concerned, it made him, more even than Metternich, the Mephistopheles of the Reaction to the German people. In Hesse itself he was known as "Hessens Hass und Fluch" (Hesse's hate and curse). In the end, however, his masterful temper became unendurable to the regent (Frederick William). In the summer of 1837 he was suddenly removed from his post as minister of the interior, and he thereupon left the elector's service.

== Service outside Hesse ==
In 1838 he was appointed head of the administration of the little principality of Hohenzollern-Sigmaringen, an office which he exchanged in the following year for that of civil governor of the grand-duchy of Luxembourg. Here, too, his independent character suffered him to remain only a year: he resented having to transact all business with the grand-duke (king of the Netherlands) through a Dutch official at the Hague; he protested against the absorption of the Luxembourg surplus in the Dutch treasury; and, failing to obtain redress, he resigned (1840).

From 1841 to 1850 he was in Prussian service, first as a member of the Prussian Supreme Tribunal (the Preußisches Obertribunal) and then (1846) as president of the high court of appeal (Oberappellationsgericht) at Greifswald. In 1850 he was tried for peculation and convicted; and, though this judgment was reversed on appeal, he left the service of Prussia.

== 1848 Revolutions ==
With somewhat indecent haste (the appeal had not been heard) he was now summoned by the elector of Hesse once more to the head of the government, and he immediately threw himself again with zeal into the struggle against the constitution. He soon found, however, that the opinion of all classes, including the army, was solidly against him, and he decided to risk all on an alliance with the reviving fortunes of Austria, which was steadily working for the restoration of the status quo overthrown by the Revolutions of 1848.

On his advice the elector seceded, from the Northern Union established by Prussia and, on September 13, committed the folly of flying secretly from Hesse with his minister. They went to Frankfurt, where the federal diet had been re-established, and on the 21st persuaded the diet to decree an armed intervention in Hesse. This decree, carried out by Austrian troops, all but led to war with Prussia, but the unreadiness of the Berlin government led to the triumph of Austria and of Hassenpflug, who at the end of the year was once more installed in power at Kassel as minister of finance.

== Retirement and family ==
His position was, however, not enviable; he was loathed and despised by all, and disliked even by his master. The climax came in November 1853, when he was publicly horse-whipped by the count of Isenburg-Wächtersbach, the elector's son-in-law. The count was pronounced insane; but Hassenpflug was conscious of the method in his madness, and tendered his resignation. This was, however, not accepted; and it was not until 16 October 1855 that he was finally relieved of his offices. He retired to Marburg, where he died on 15 October 1862. He lived just long enough to hear of the restoration of the Hesse constitution of 1831 (21 June 1862), which it had been his life's mission to destroy.

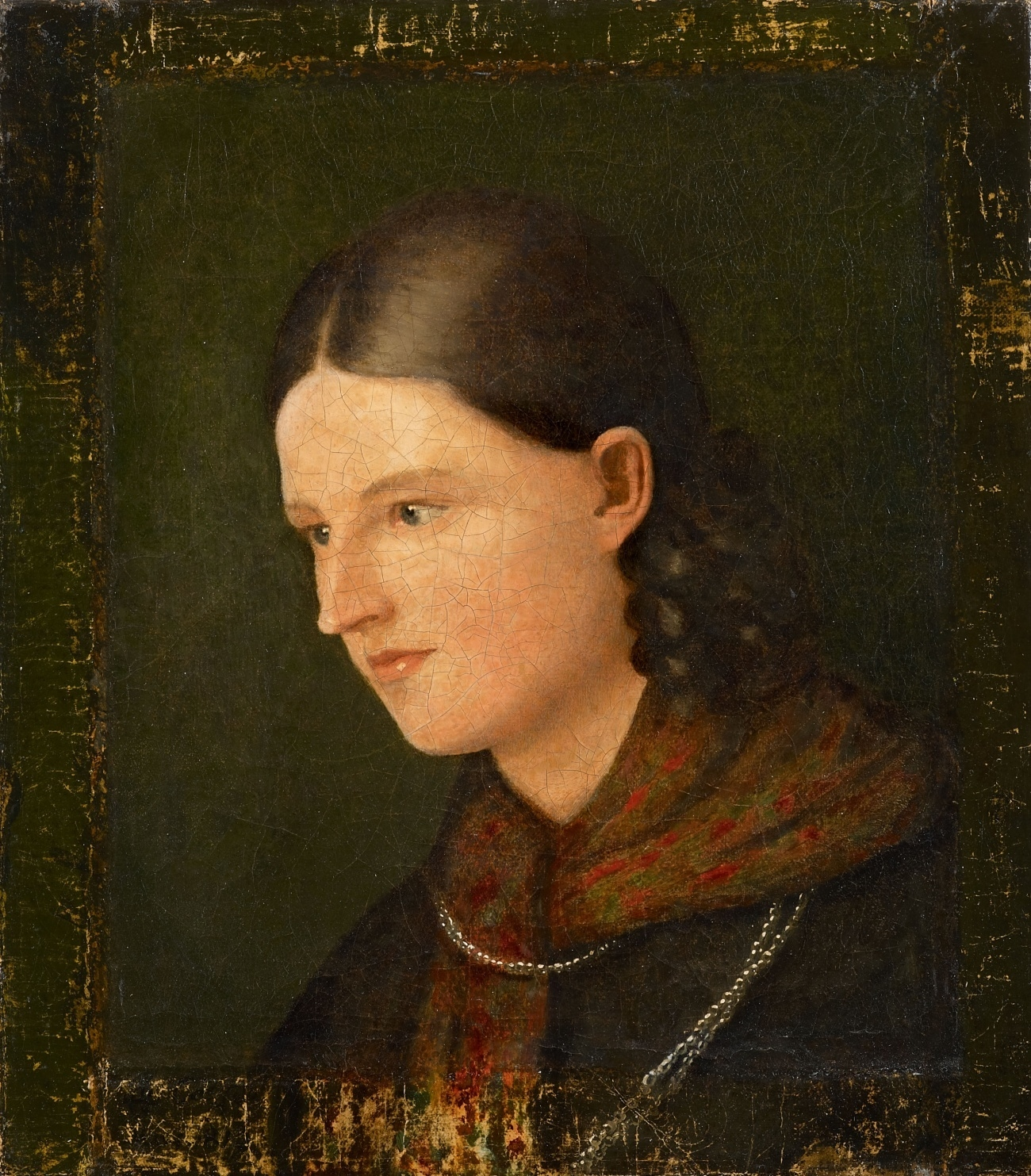
Charlotte Amalie Hassenpflug, née Grimm (1818)

Of his publications the most important is Actenstücke, die landständischen Anklagen wider den Kurfurst/ir/ien hessischen Staatsminister Hassenpflug. Ein Beiträg zur Zeitgeschichte und zum neueren deutschen Staatsrechte, anonym. (Stuttgart and Tübingen, 1836). He was twice married, his first wife being the sister of the brothers Grimm. His son Karl Hassenpflug (1824–1890) was a distinguished sculptor.
