= Brothers Grimm =

Brother duo of German academics and folklorists

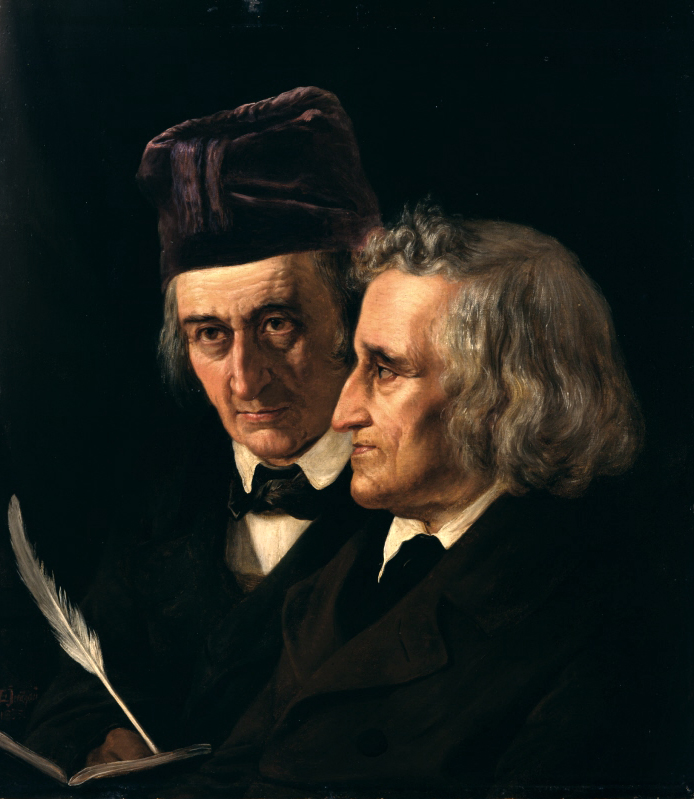
Wilhelm Grimm (left) and Jacob Grimm, depicted by Elisabeth Jerichau-Baumann (1855).

The Brothers Grimm (German: die Brüder Grimm or die Gebrüder Grimm), Jacob (1785–1863) and Wilhelm (1786–1859), were German academics, linguists, cultural researchers, and authors whose work in folklore, linguistics, and literary scholarship shaped the development of modern folkloristics and the study of the German language. Born in Hanau and raised in Steinau, they were educated in Kassel and at the University of Marburg, where they developed a lasting interest in medieval literature and German cultural history. The first collection of folk tales, Children's and Household Tales (Kinder- und Hausmärchen), was published in 1812. The Grimms are among the best-known story tellers of European folktales, and their work popularized such stories as "Cinderella", "The Frog Prince" (Der Froschkönig), "Hansel and Gretel" (Hänsel und Gretel), "Rapunzel", "Rumpelstiltskin" (Rumpelstilzchen), and "Snow White" (Schneewittchen).

Kinder- und Hausmärchen was based on stories gathered largely from educated, urban acquaintances. They expanded and revised the collection throughout their lives, refining the language and themes of the tales and producing one of the most influential works in the world of folklore. Alongside this work, they published studies on Germanic and Scandinavian legends, medieval texts, and the history of language. The brothers began a definitive German dictionary (Deutsches Wörterbuch) in 1838, an ambitious historical dictionary that remained uncompleted at their deaths. Their scholarship and their methods for documenting oral traditions established lasting standards for the study of folklore.

The rise of romanticism in the 19th century revived interest in traditional folk stories, which to the Grimm brothers represented a pure form of national literature and culture. With the goal of researching a scholarly treatise on folk tales, the brothers established a methodology for collecting and recording folk stories that became the basis for studies in folklore; between 1812 and 1857 their collection of Kinder- und Hausmärchen went through many editions and modifications, and grew from 86 stories to more than 200. The Grimms' tales grew steadily in popularity and have since been translated widely, adapted in literature and film, and examined in political, educational, and psychological contexts. Their work continues to influence research in folklore and the history of the German language.

== Biography ==
=== Early lives ===
The birthplace of Jacob and Wilhelm Grimm at the former Paradeplatz 1 in Hanau, shown in 1896. The building was destroyed in the bombing of Hanau on 19 March 1945.

Jacob Ludwig Carl Grimm was born on 4 January 1785 and Wilhelm Carl Grimm on 24 February 1786 in Hanau, in the Landgraviate of Hesse-Kassel. They were born into an educated Reformed Protestant family with clerical and legal ties to Hanau and Steinau. Their great-grandfather Friedrich Grimm the Elder had served as a Reformed clergyman in Hanau and as church inspector for Hanau-Münzenberg, while their grandfather Friedrich Grimm was later pastor in Steinau. Their father, Philipp Wilhelm Grimm, studied law and worked in Hanau as a court solicitor and Stadtschreiber before his appointment as Amtmann, or district magistrate, in Steinau in 1791.

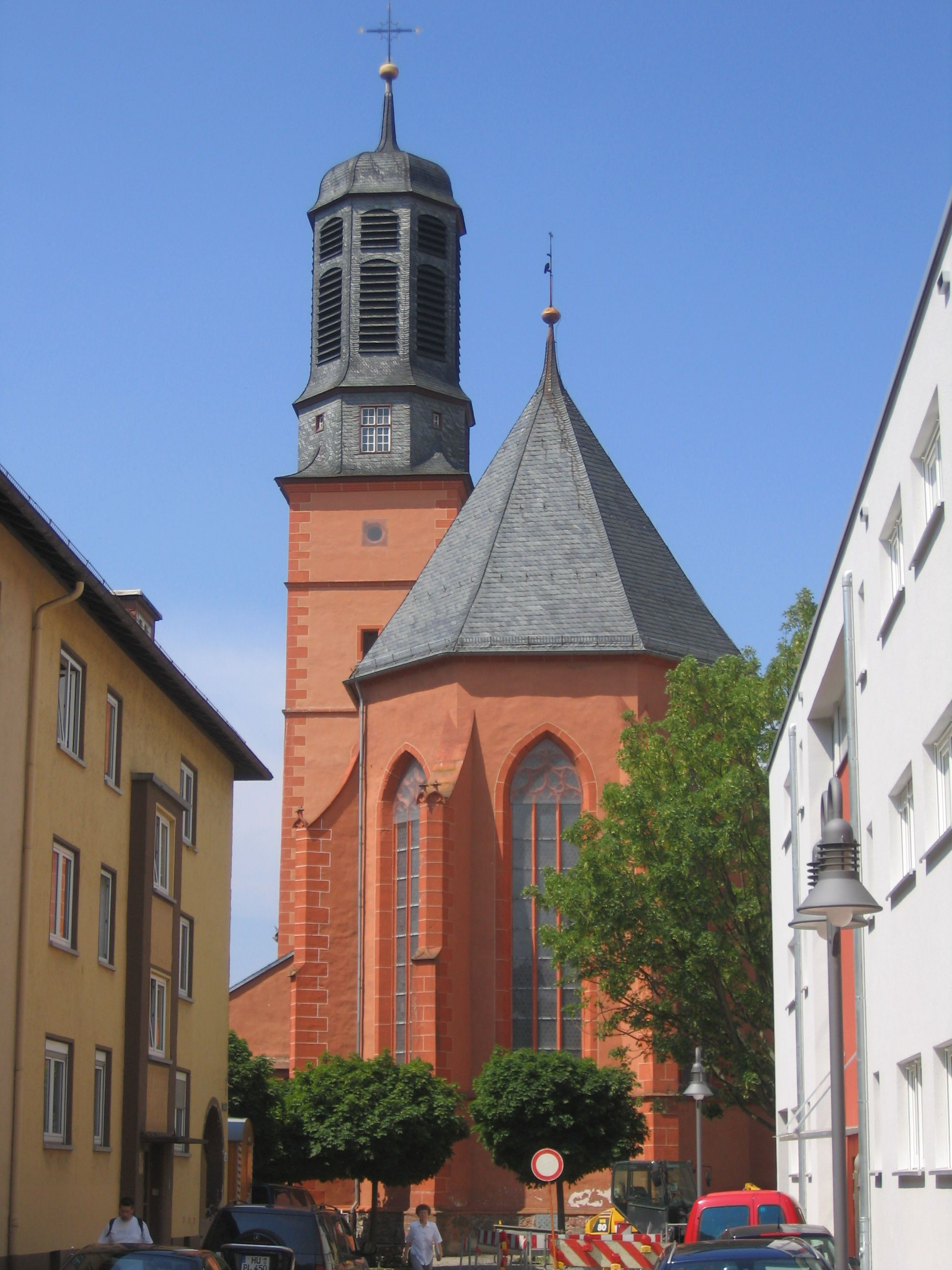
The Marienkirche in Hanau, where Jacob Grimm was baptized on 9 January 1785 and Wilhelm Grimm on 3 March 1786. Their great-grandfather Friedrich Grimm the Elder served there as a Reformed pastor and church inspector.

Hanau was the most important town in Hesse-Kassel after Kassel and was more commercially prosperous than much of the landgraviate. Its medieval Old Town stood beside the Kinzig River, while its planned New Town had been built principally for Reformed refugees from France and the Netherlands. Although Philipp Wilhelm served the Old Town administration, the Grimm family lived in the New Town, where Jacob and Wilhelm spent their earliest childhood. Their paternal aunt Charlotte Schlemmer lived nearby and gave the boys much of their first instruction; Wilhelm later remembered walking with Jacob across the New Town market to a French-language teacher near the church.

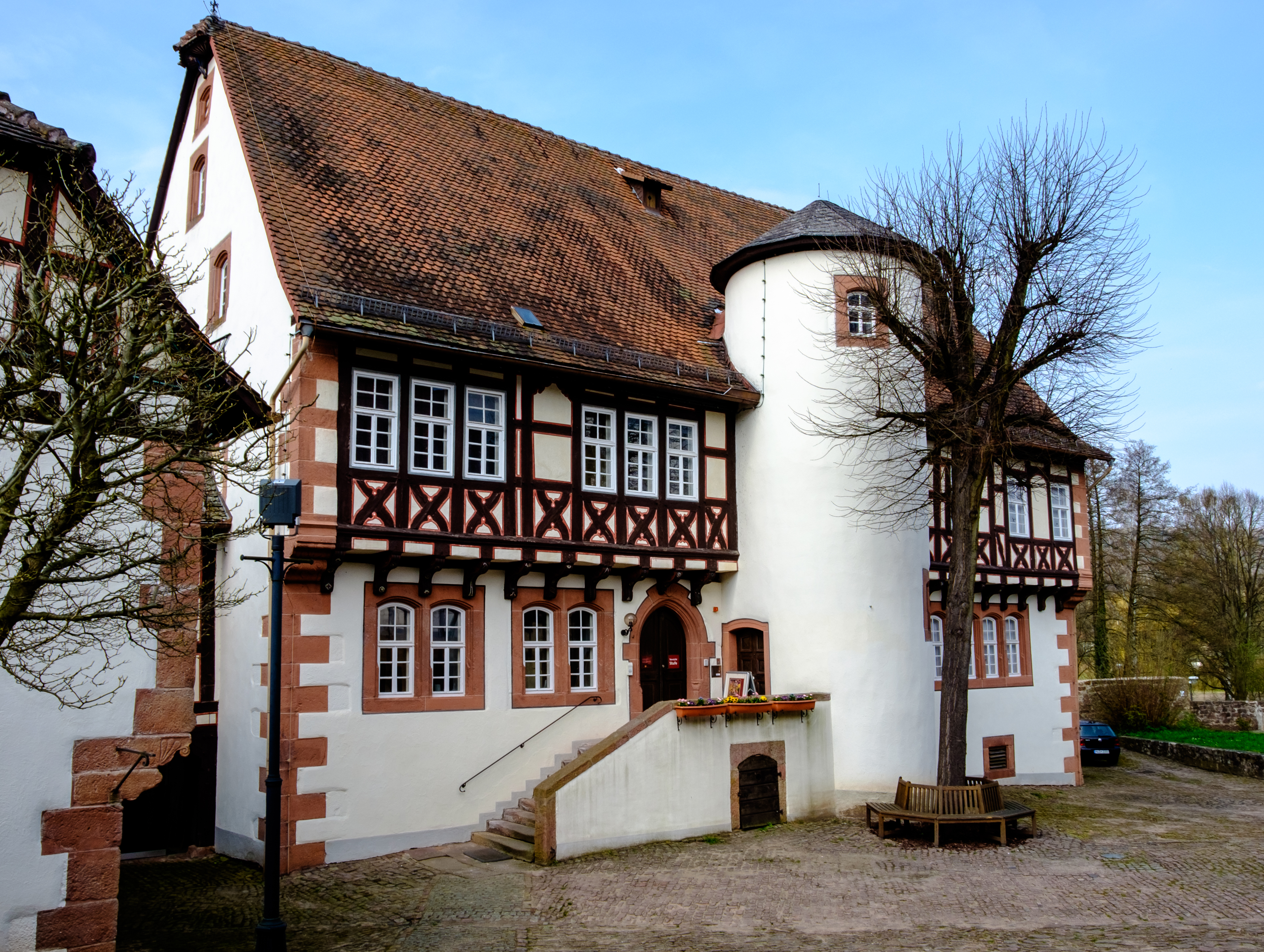
The former magistrate's house in Steinau, the Grimm family's official residence from 1791 until shortly after Philipp Wilhelm Grimm's death in 1796.

In January 1791 the family moved to Steinau an der Straße, where Philipp Wilhelm had been appointed Amtmann. Steinau was a small town in the Kinzig valley, but it lay on the Via Regia, the major road linking Frankfurt and Leipzig. The Grimms lived in the magistrate's house, a large official residence connected to Philipp Wilhelm's office. As the senior administrative and legal official in the district, Philipp Wilhelm handled public order, civil and criminal lawsuits, notarial duties, and regulations concerning agriculture, education, religion, censorship, and construction. His ex libris bore the Latin motto Tute si recte vixeris, translated by Ann Schmiesing as "You live securely if you live justly".

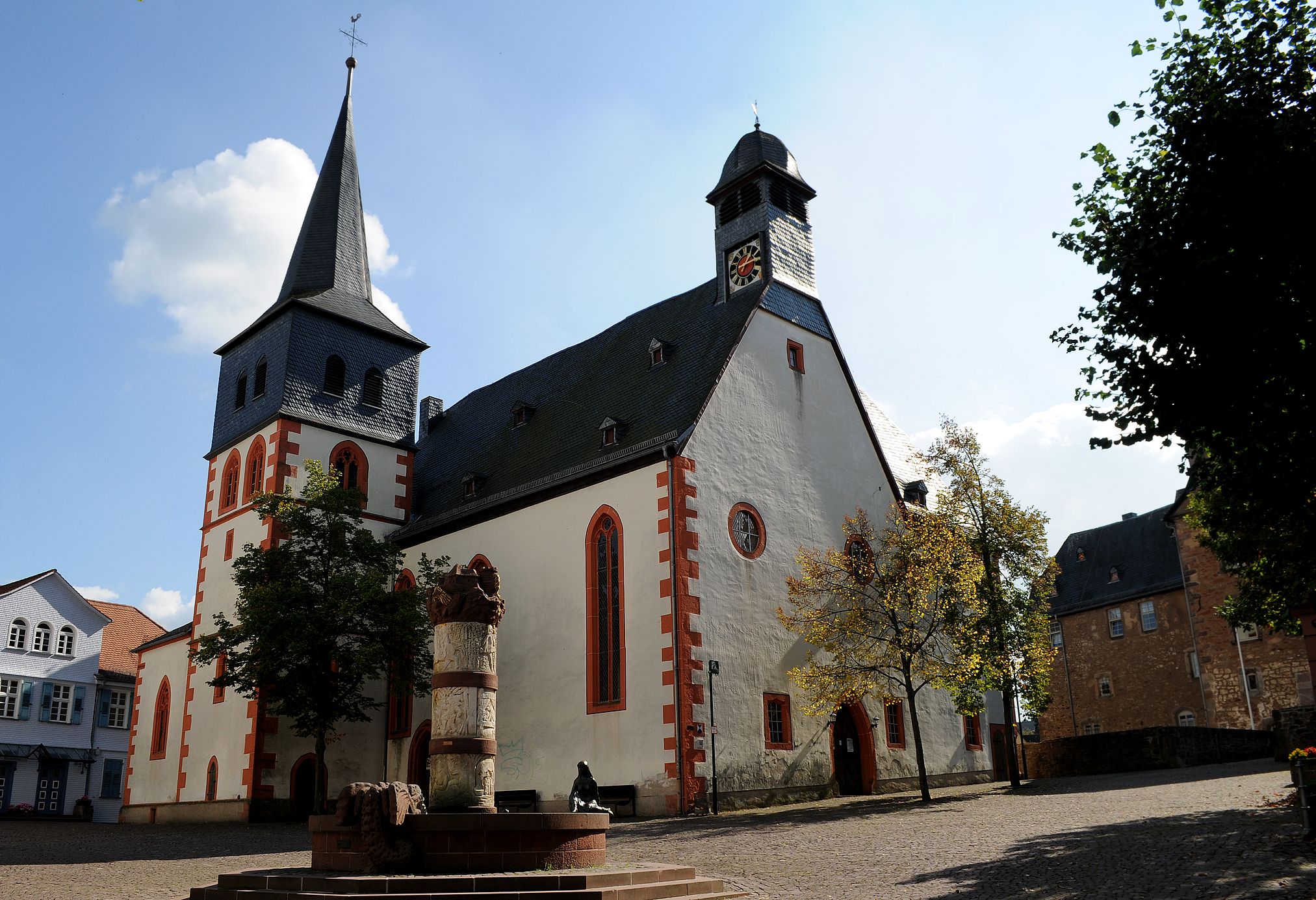
St. Catherine's Church in Steinau, where Jacob and Wilhelm Grimm worshipped during childhood; their grandfather Friedrich Grimm served there as Reformed pastor from 1730 to 1777.

In Steinau, Jacob and Wilhelm were tutored by Johann Georg Zinckhan in arithmetic, writing, religion, Latin, and music. Their later memories of the town included the half-timbered magistrate's house, its walled courtyard, daily lessons, and their upbringing in the Reformed church. In Murphy's translation of Jacob's autobiography, Jacob recalled that the children had been raised "strictly Reformed", "not that there was much talk about it", but chiefly by "deed and example"; he also remembered the day of his confirmation, after receiving Holy Communion, when he watched his mother walk toward the altar of the church where his grandfather had once stood in the pulpit. Jacob was confirmed in the Calvinist St. Catherine's Church on 1 April 1798, Palm Sunday, by pastor Jonas Bauscher.

The family's security changed abruptly after Philipp Wilhelm died of pneumonia on 10 January 1796, at the age of forty-four. Jacob had just turned eleven and Wilhelm was nearly ten. The family lost the income and benefits attached to Philipp Wilhelm's office and had to leave the magistrate's house within weeks. Dorothea Grimm and her six children first moved into the crowded almshouse next door, then into a more modest house in Steinau. A small pension and help from relatives, especially Dorothea's sister Henriette Zimmer in Kassel, helped keep the family afloat.

By 1798 Jacob and Wilhelm had exhausted the instruction available in Steinau. With Henriette Zimmer's support, the brothers left for Kassel in September to attend the Lyceum Fridericianum. The move separated them from their mother and younger siblings but was intended to prepare them for university study and eventual professional employment. Schmiesing notes that the school's entrance embodied the dictum ora et labora ("pray and work") through allegorical figures of religion and diligence, an imperative also pressed on the brothers by their mother and grandfather.

=== Marburg ===
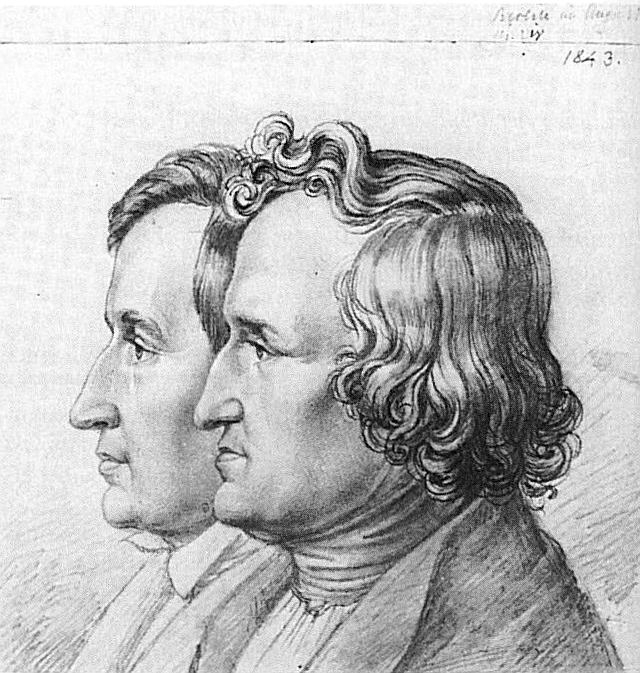
Wilhelm and Jacob Grimm in an 1843 drawing by younger brother Ludwig Emil Grimm

After graduation from the Friedrichsgymnasium, the brothers attended Marburg University. The university was small with about 200 students, and there they became painfully aware that students of lower social status were not treated equally. They were disqualified from admission because of their social standing and had to request a dispensation to study law. Wealthier students received stipends, but the brothers were excluded even from tuition aid. Their poverty kept them from student activities or university social life, but their outsider status worked in their favor and they pursued their studies with extra vigor.

Inspired by their law professor, Friedrich von Savigny, who awakened in them an interest in history and philology, the brothers studied medieval German literature. They shared Savigny's desire to see the unification of the 200 German principalities into a single state. Through Savigny and his circle of friends—German romantics such as Clemens Brentano and Ludwig Achim von Arnim—the Grimms were introduced to the ideas of Johann Gottfried Herder, who thought that German literature should revert to simpler forms, which he defined as Volkspoesie (natural poetry)—as opposed to Kunstpoesie (artistic poetry). The brothers dedicated themselves with great enthusiasm to their studies, of which Wilhelm wrote in his autobiography, "the ardor with which we studied Old German helped us overcome the spiritual depression of those days."

Jacob was still financially responsible for his mother, brother, and younger siblings in 1805, so he accepted a post in Paris as Savigny's research assistant. On his return to Marburg he was forced to abandon his studies to support the family, whose poverty was so extreme that food was often scarce, and take a job with the Hessian War Commission. In a letter to his aunt from this time, Wilhelm wrote of their circumstances: "We five people eat only three portions and only once a day".

=== Kassel ===
Jacob found full-time employment in 1808 when he was appointed court librarian to the King of Westphalia and went on to become a librarian in Kassel. After their mother's death that year, he became fully responsible for his younger siblings. He arranged and paid for his brother Ludwig's studies at art school and for Wilhelm's extended visit to Halle to seek treatment for heart and respiratory ailments, after which Wilhelm joined Jacob as librarian in Kassel At Brentano's request, the brothers had begun collecting folk tales in a cursory manner in 1807. According to Zipes, at this point "the Grimms were unable to devote all their energies to their research and did not have a clear idea about the significance of collecting folk tales in this initial phase."

During their employment as librarians—which paid little but afforded them ample time for research—the brothers experienced a productive period of scholarship, publishing books between 1812 and 1830. In 1812 they published their first volume of 86 folk tales, Kinder- und Hausmärchen, followed quickly by two volumes of German legends and a volume of early literary history. They went on to publish works about Danish and Irish folk tales (and also Norse mythology), while continuing to edit the German folk tale collection. These works became so widely recognized that the brothers received honorary doctorates from universities in Marburg, Berlin, and Breslau (now Wrocław).

=== Göttingen ===
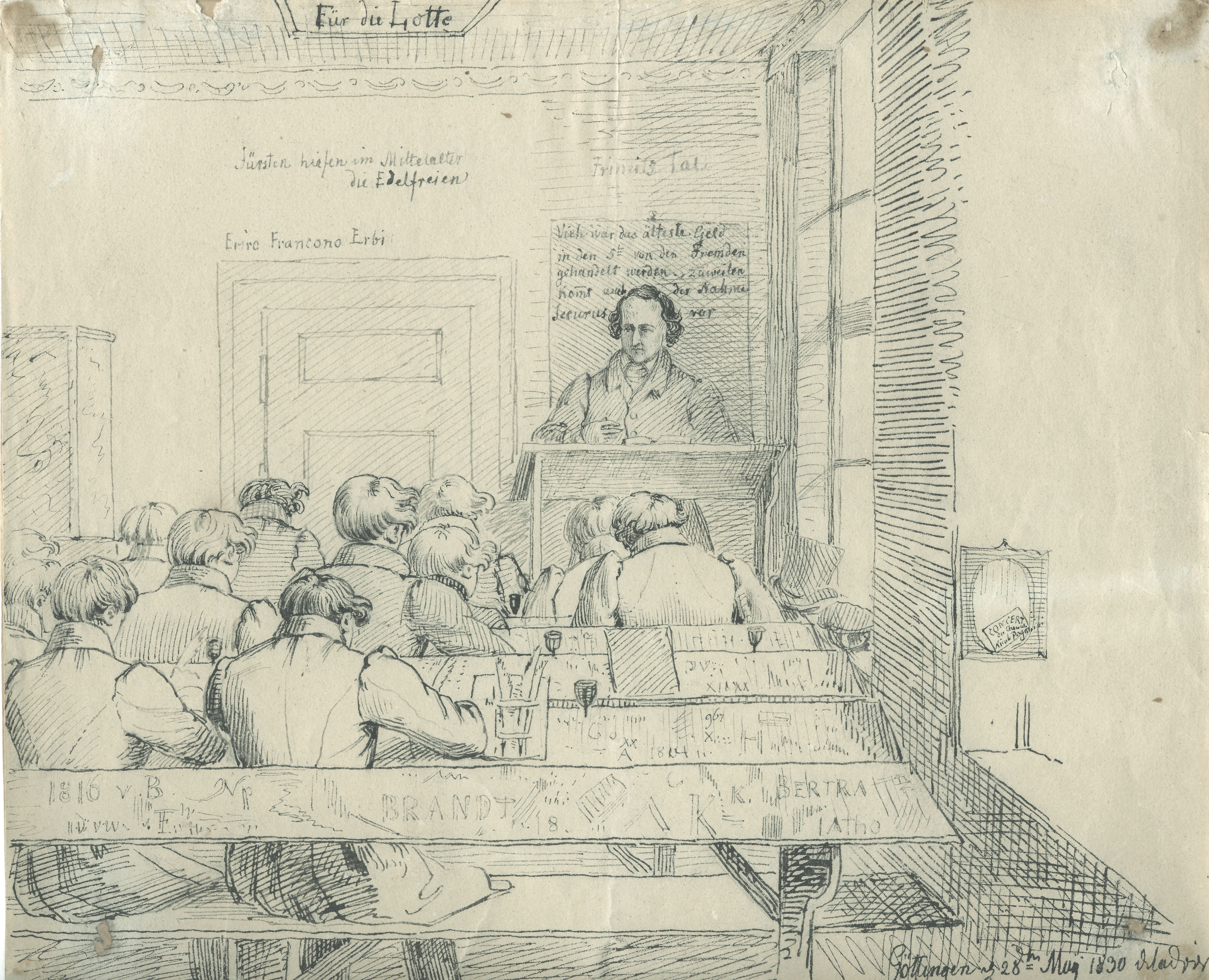
Jacob Grimm lecturing (illustration by Ludwig Emil Grimm, c. 1830)

On 15 May 1825 Wilhelm married Henriette Dorothea "Dortchen" Wild, a pharmacist's daughter and childhood friend who had given the brothers several tales. Jacob never married but continued to live in the household with Wilhelm and Dortchen. In 1830 both brothers were overlooked when the post of chief librarian came available, which disappointed them greatly. They moved the household to Göttingen in the Kingdom of Hanover, where they took employment at the University of Göttingen—Jacob as a professor and head librarian and Wilhelm as a professor.

For the next seven years the brothers continued to research, write, and publish. In 1835, Jacob published the well-regarded German Mythology (Deutsche Mythologie); Wilhelm continued to edit and prepare the third edition of Kinder- und Hausmärchen for publication. The two brothers taught German studies at the university, becoming well-respected in the newly established discipline.

In 1837 the brothers lost their university posts after joining the rest of the Göttingen Seven in protest. The 1830s were a period of political upheaval and peasant revolt in Germany, leading to the movement for democratic reform known as Young Germany. The brothers were not directly aligned with the Young Germans, but they and five of their colleagues reacted against the demands of Ernest Augustus, King of Hanover, who in 1837 dissolved the parliament of Hanover and demanded oaths of allegiance from civil servants—including professors at the University of Göttingen. For refusing to sign the oath, the seven professors were dismissed and three were deported from Hanover—including Jacob, who went to Kassel. He was later joined there by Wilhelm, Dortchen, and their four children.

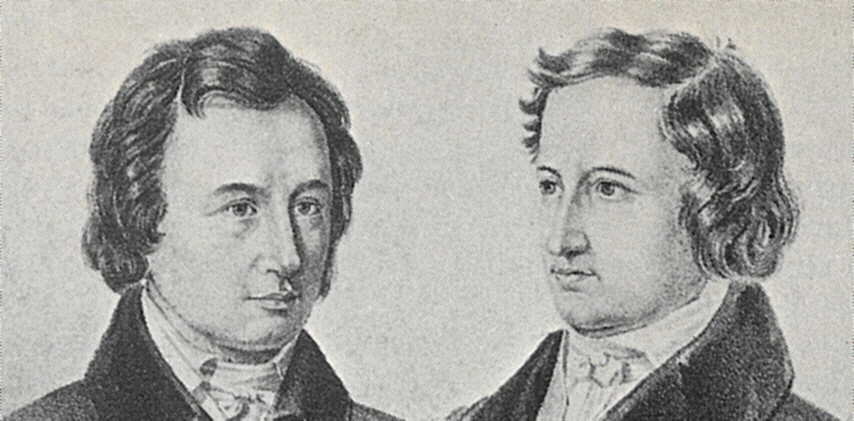
Wilhelm and Jacob Grimm, c. 1837

The brothers were without income and again in extreme financial difficulty in 1838, so they began what would become a lifelong project—the writing of a definitive dictionary, the German Dictionary (Deutsches Wörterbuch)—whose first volume was not published until 1854. The brothers again depended on friends and supporters for financial assistance and influence in finding employment.

=== Berlin and later years ===
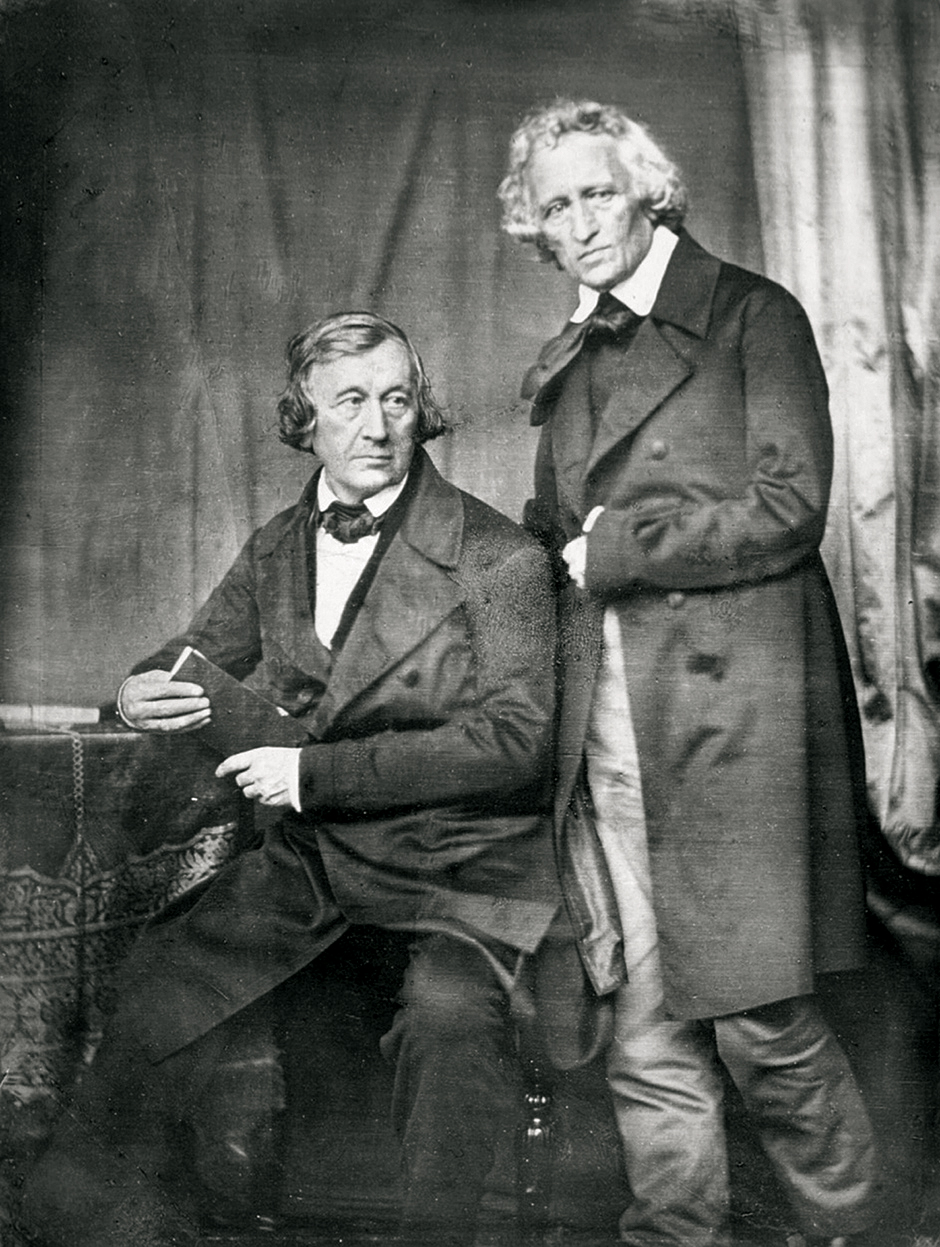
Wilhelm and Jacob Grimm in 1847 (daguerreotype)

In 1840, Savigny and Bettina von Arnim appealed successfully to Frederick William IV of Prussia on behalf of the brothers, who were offered posts at the University of Berlin. In addition to teaching posts, the Academy of Sciences offered them stipends to continue their research. Once they had established their household in Berlin they directed their efforts towards the work on the German dictionary and continued to publish their research. Jacob turned his attention to researching German legal traditions and the history of the German language, which was published in the late 1840s and early 1850s; Wilhelm began researching medieval literature while editing new editions of Hausmärchen.

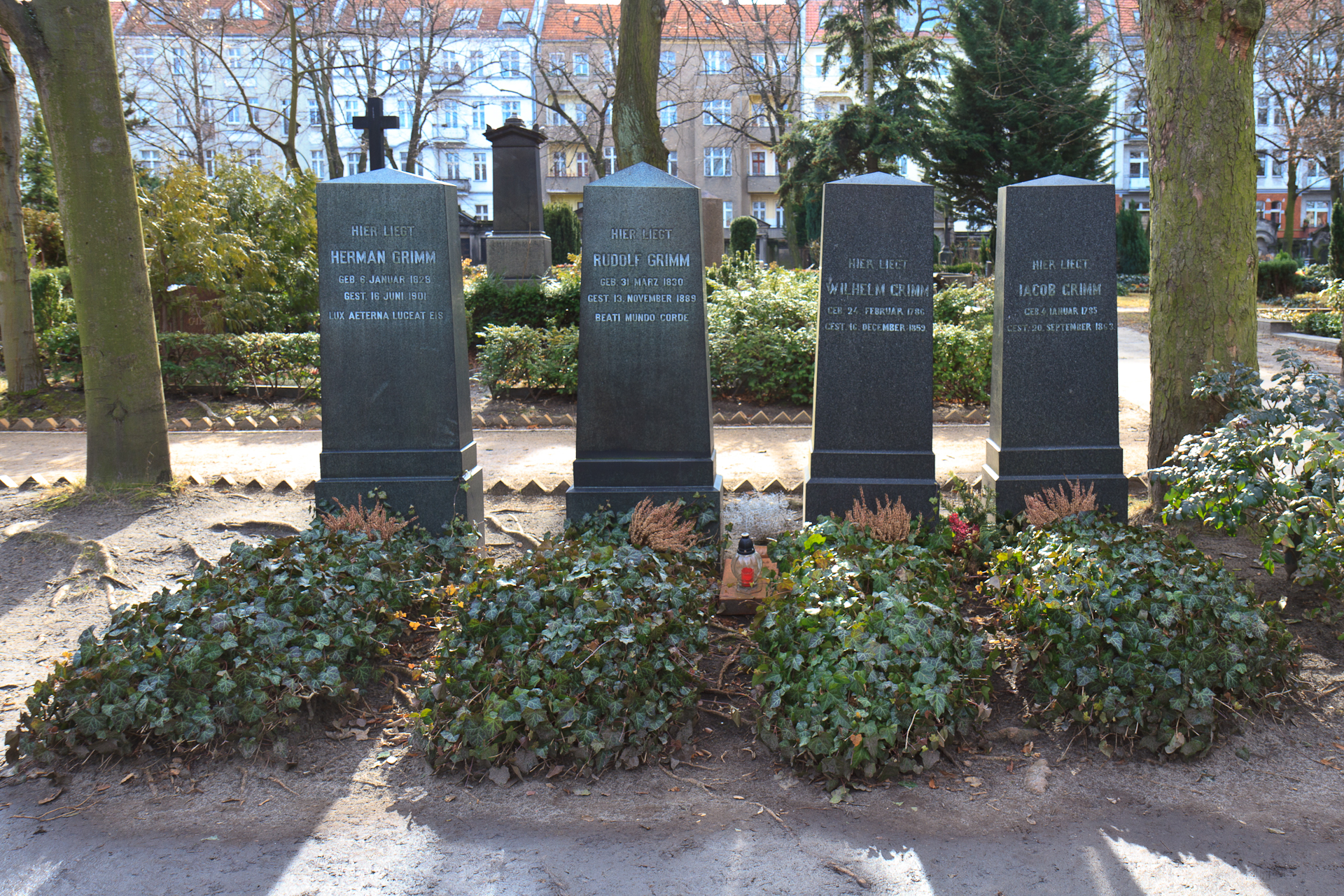
The graves of the Brothers Grimm in Schöneberg, Berlin (St. Matthäus Kirchhof Cemetery)

After the revolutions of 1848 in the German states the brothers were elected to the civil parliament. Jacob became a prominent member of the National Assembly at Mainz. But their political activities were short-lived, as their hope for a unified Germany dwindled and their disenchantment grew.

In the late 1840s Jacob resigned his university position and published The History of the German Language (Geschichte der deutschen Sprache). Wilhelm continued at his university post until 1852. After retiring from teaching, the brothers devoted themselves to the German Dictionary for the rest of their lives. Wilhelm died of an infection in Berlin on 16 December 1859, and Jacob, deeply upset by his death, became increasingly reclusive. He continued working on the dictionary until his own death on 20 September 1863. Zipes writes of the Grimms' dictionary, and of their very large body of work: "Symbolically the last word was Frucht (fruit)."

== Children's and Household Tales ==
=== Background ===
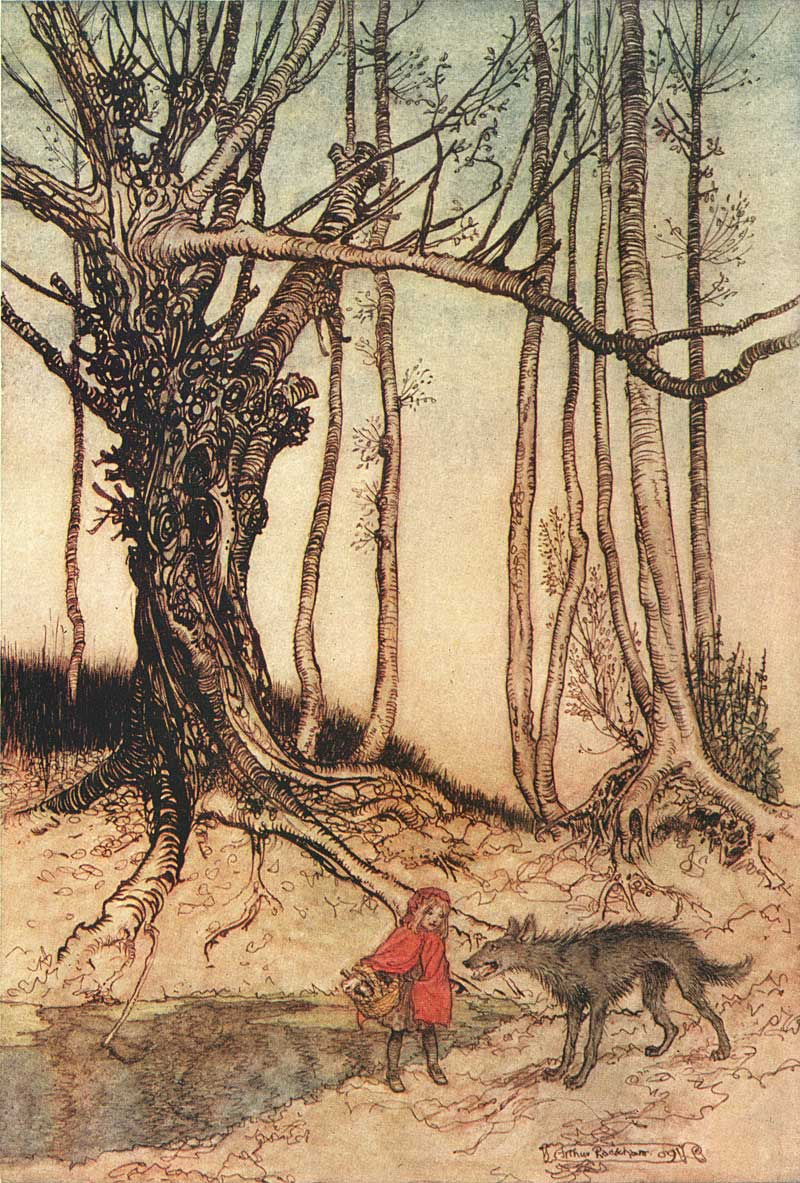
The Grimms defined "Little Red Riding Hood", shown here in an illustration by Arthur Rackham, as representative of a uniquely German tale, although it existed in various versions and regions.

The rise of romanticism, romantic nationalism, and trends in valuing popular culture in the early 19th century revived interest in fairy tales, which had declined since their late 17th-century peak. Johann Karl August Musäus published a popular collection of tales called Volksmärchen der Deutschen between 1782 and 1787; the Grimms aided the revival with their folklore collection, built on the conviction that a national identity could be found in popular culture and with the common folk (Volk).

They collected and published their tales as a reflection of German cultural identity. In the first collection, though, they included Charles Perrault's tales, published in Paris in 1697 and written for the literary salons of an aristocratic French audience. Scholar Lydie Jean says that Perrault created a myth that his tales came from the common people and reflected existing folklore to justify including them—even though many of them were original.

The brothers were directly influenced by Brentano and von Arnim, who edited and adapted the folk songs of Des Knaben Wunderhorn (The Boy's Magic Horn or cornucopia). They began the collection with the purpose of creating a scholarly treatise of traditional stories, and of preserving the stories as they had been handed from generation to generation—a practice threatened by increased industrialization. Maria Tatar, professor of German studies at Harvard University, argues that it is precisely the handing from generation to generation and the genesis in the oral tradition that gives folk tales important mutability. Versions of tales differ from region to region, "picking up bits and pieces of local culture and lore, drawing a turn of phrase from a song or another story, and fleshing out characters with features taken from the audience witnessing their performance."

But Tatar argues that the Grimms appropriated as uniquely German stories, such as "Little Red Riding Hood", that had existed in many versions and regions throughout Europe, because they believed that such stories reflected Germanic culture. Furthermore, the brothers saw fragments of old religions and faiths reflected in the stories, which they thought continued to exist and survive through the telling of stories.

=== Methodology ===
When Jacob returned to Marburg from Paris in 1806, their friend Brentano sought the brothers' help in adding to his collection of folk tales, at which time the brothers began to gather tales in an organized fashion. By 1810 they had produced a manuscript collection of several dozen tales, written after inviting storytellers to their home and transcribing what they heard. These tales were heavily modified in transcription; many had roots in previously written sources. At Brentano's request, they printed and sent him copies of the 53 tales that they collected for inclusion in his third volume of Des Knaben Wunderhorn. Brentano either ignored or forgot about the tales, leaving the copies in a church in Alsace where they were found in 1920 and became known as the Ölenberg manuscript. It is the earliest extant version of the Grimms' collection and has become a valuable source to scholars studying the development of the Grimms' collection from the time of its inception. The manuscript was published in 1927 and again in 1975.

The brothers gained a reputation for collecting tales from peasants, although many tales came from middle-class or aristocratic acquaintances. Wilhelm's wife, Henriette Dorothea (Dortchen) Wild, and her family, with their nursery maid, told the brothers some of the more well-known tales, such as "Hansel and Gretel" and "Sleeping Beauty". Wilhelm collected some tales after befriending August von Haxthausen, whom he visited in 1811 in Westphalia where he heard stories from von Haxthausen's circle of friends. Several of the storytellers were of Huguenot ancestry, telling tales of French origin such as those told to the Grimms by Marie Hassenpflug, an educated woman of French Huguenot ancestry, and it is probable that these informants were familiar with Perrault's Histoires ou contes du temps passé (Stories from Past Times). Other tales were collected from Dorothea Viehmann, the wife of a middle-class tailor and also of French descent. Despite her middle-class background, in the first English translation she was characterized as a peasant and given the name Gammer Gretel. At least one tale, Gevatter Tod (Grim Reaper), was provided by composer Wilhelmine Schwertzell, with whom Wilhelm had a long correspondence.

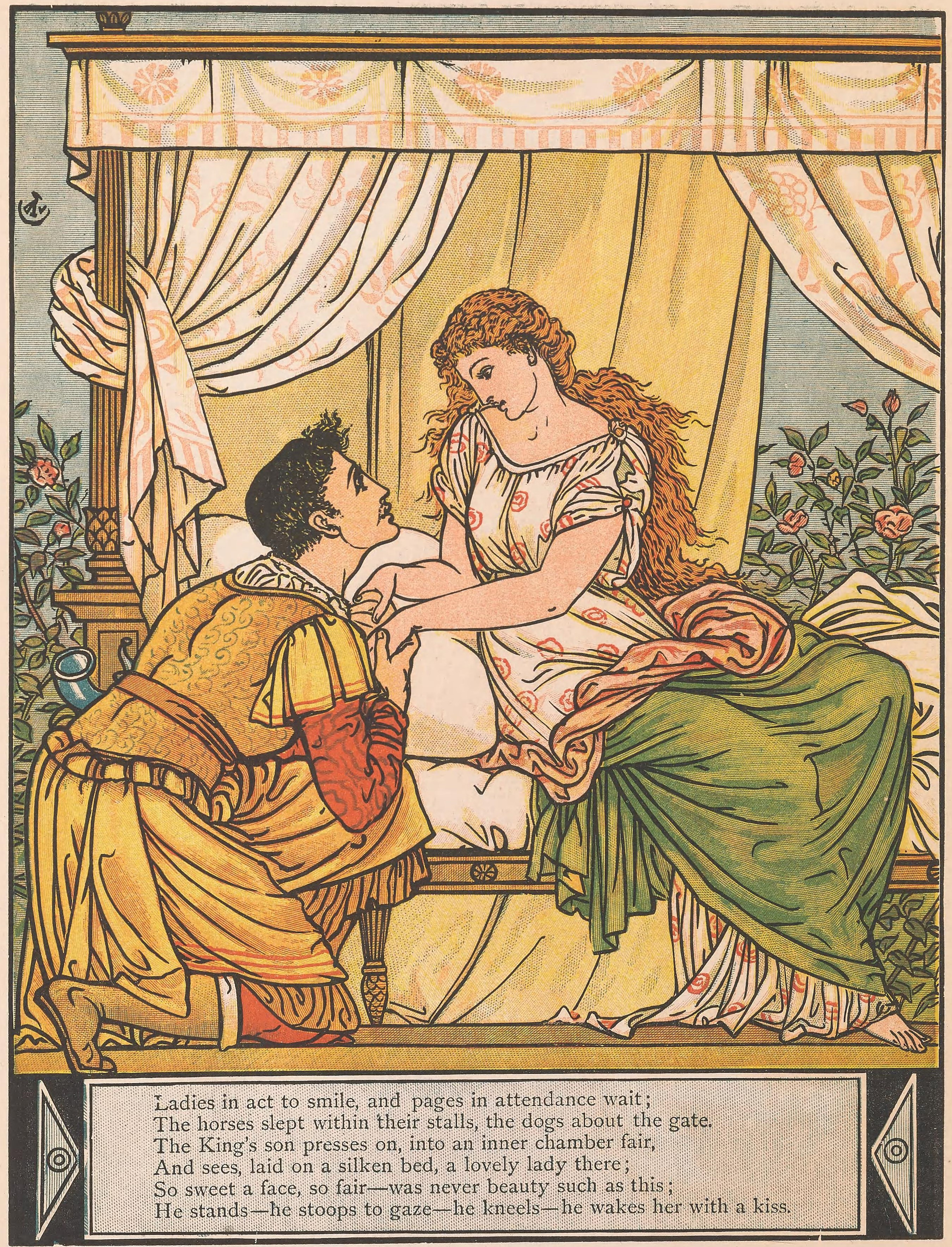
Stories such as "Sleeping Beauty", shown here in a Walter Crane illustration, had been previously published and were rewritten by the Brothers Grimm.

According to scholars such as Tatar and Ruth Bottigheimer, some of the tales probably originated in written form during the medieval period with writers such as Straparola and Boccaccio, but were modified in the 17th century and again rewritten by the Grimms. Moreover, Tatar writes that the brothers' goal of preserving and shaping the tales as something uniquely German at a time of French occupation was a form of "intellectual resistance", and in so doing they established a methodology for collecting and preserving folklore that set the model followed later by writers throughout Europe during periods of occupation.

=== Writing ===
From 1807 onward, the brothers added to the collection. Jacob established the framework, maintained through many iterations; from 1815 until his death, Wilhelm assumed sole responsibility for editing and rewriting the tales. He made the tales stylistically similar, added dialogue, removed pieces "that might detract from a rustic tone", improved the plots, and incorporated psychological motifs. Ronald Murphy writes in The Owl, the Raven, and the Dove that the brothers, particularly Wilhelm, also added religious and spiritual motifs to the tales. He believes that Wilhelm "gleaned" bits from old Germanic faiths, Norse mythology, Roman and Greek mythology, and biblical stories that he reshaped.

Over the years, Wilhelm worked extensively on the prose; he expanded and added detail to the stories to the point that many of them grew to twice the length they had in the earliest published editions. In the later editions Wilhelm polished the language to make it more enticing to a bourgeois audience, eliminated sexual elements, and some believe he added Christian elements. After 1819 he began writing original tales for children (children were not initially considered the primary audience) and adding didactic elements to existing tales.

Some changes were made in light of unfavorable reviews, particularly from those who objected that not all the tales were suitable for children because of scenes of violence and sexuality. He worked to modify plots for many of the stories; for example, "Rapunzel" in the first edition of Kinder- und Hausmärchen clearly shows a sexual relationship between the prince and the girl in the tower, which he edited out in subsequent editions. Tatar writes that morals were added (in the second edition a king's regret was added to the scene in which his wife is to be burned at the stake) and often the characters in the tale were amended to appear more German: "every fairy (Fee), prince (Prinz) and princess (Prinzessin)—all words of French origin—was transformed into a more Teutonic-sounding enchantress (Zauberin) or wise woman (weise Frau), king's son (Königssohn), king's daughter (Königstochter)."

=== Themes and analysis ===
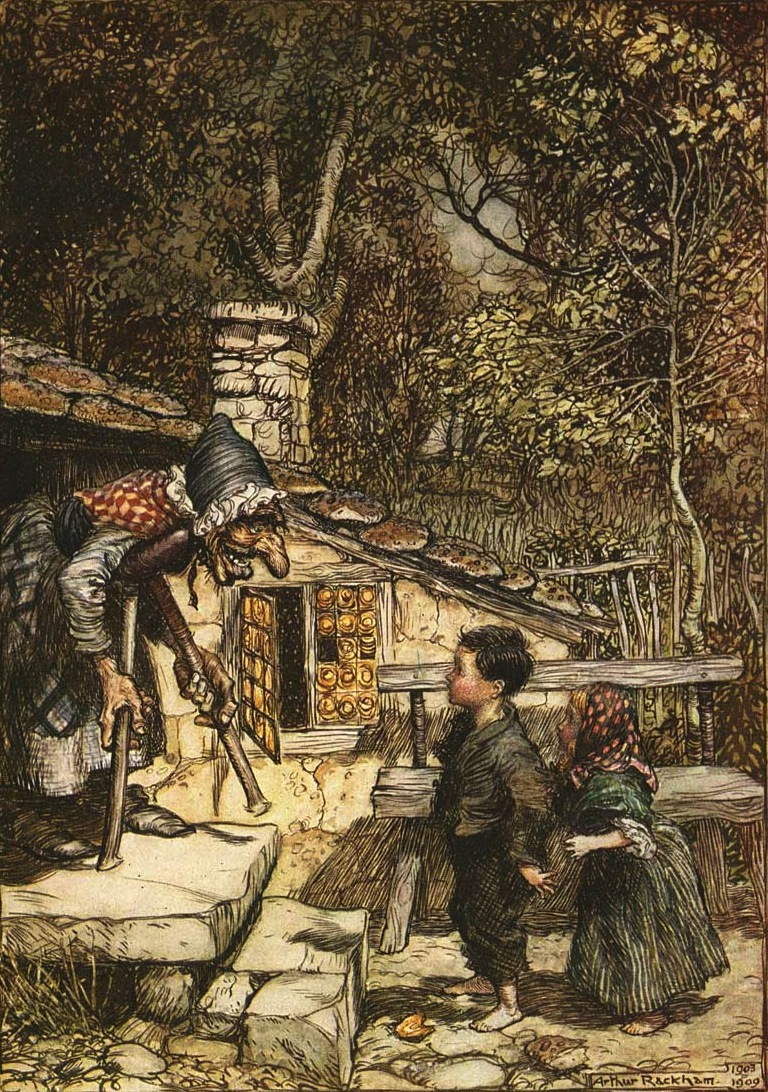
"Hansel and Gretel" (1909), illustrated by Arthur Rackham, was a "warning tale" for children.

The Grimms' legacy contains legends, novellas, and folk stories, the vast majority of which were not intended as children's tales. Von Arnim was concerned about the content of some of the tales—such as those that showed children being eaten—and suggested adding a subtitle to warn parents of the content. Instead the brothers added an introduction with cautionary advice that parents steer children toward age-appropriate stories. Despite von Arnim's unease, none of the tales were eliminated from the collection; the brothers believed that all the tales were of value and reflected inherent cultural qualities. Furthermore, the stories were didactic in nature at a time when discipline relied on fear, according to scholar Linda Dégh, who explains that tales such as "Little Red Riding Hood" and "Hansel and Gretel" were written as "warning tales" for children.

The stories in Kinder- und Hausmärchen include scenes of violence that have since been sanitized. For example, in the Grimms' original version of "Snow White", the Queen is Little Snow White's mother, not her stepmother, but still orders her Huntsman to kill Snow White (her biological daughter) and bring home the child's lungs and liver so that she can eat them; the story ends with the Queen dancing at Snow White's wedding, wearing a pair of red-hot iron shoes that kill her. Another story, "The Goose Girl", has a servant stripped naked and pushed into a barrel "studded with sharp nails" pointing inward and then rolled down the street. The Grimms' version of "The Frog Prince" describes the princess throwing the frog against a wall instead of kissing him. To some extent the cruelty and violence may have reflected the medieval culture from which the tales originated, such as scenes of witches burning, as described in "The Six Swans".

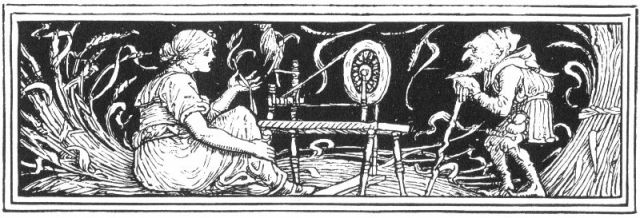
"Rumpelstiltskin", shown here in an illustrated border by Walter Crane, is an example of a "spinning tale".

Tales with a spinning motif are broadly represented in the collection. In her essay "Tale Spinners: Submerged Voices in Grimms' Fairy Tales", Bottigheimer argues that these stories reflect the degree to which spinning was crucial in the life of women in the 19th century and earlier. Spinning, particularly of flax, was commonly performed in the home by women. Many stories begin by describing the occupation of their main character, as in "There once was a miller", yet spinning is never mentioned as an occupation; this appears to be because the brothers did not consider it an occupation. Instead, spinning was a communal activity, frequently performed in a Spinnstube (spinning room), a place where women most likely kept the oral traditions alive by telling stories while engaged in tedious work. In the stories, a woman's personality is often represented by her attitude toward spinning; a wise woman might be a spinster and Bottigheimer writes that the spindle was the symbol of a "diligent, well-ordered womanhood". In some stories, such as "Rumpelstiltskin", spinning is associated with a threat; in others, spinning might be avoided by a character who is either too lazy or not accustomed to spinning because of her high social status.

The Grimms' work have been subjected to feminist critique. For example, Emma Tennant writes:

But the worst of it was that two men—the Brothers Grimm—listened to these old tales told by mothers to their daughters; and they decided to record them for posterity. ... But the Brothers Grimm could understand only the tales of courage and manliness and chivalry on the part of the boys. The girls were relegated to virtues—Patient Griselda; or sheer physical beauty—Sleeping Beauty; Beauty and the Beast. Always we must read that our heroine is a Beauty.

The tales were also criticized for being insufficiently German, which influenced the tales that the brothers included and their use of language. But scholars such as Heinz Rölleke say that the stories are an accurate depiction of German culture, showing "rustic simplicity [and] sexual modesty". German culture is deeply rooted in the forest (Wald), a dark dangerous place to be avoided, most particularly the old forests with large oak trees, and yet a place where Little Red Riding Hood's mother sent her daughter to deliver food to her grandmother's house.

Some critics, such as Alistair Hauke, use Jungian analysis to say that the deaths of the brothers' father and grandfather are the reason for the Grimms' tendency to idealize and excuse fathers, as well as the predominance of female villains in the tales, such as the wicked stepmother and stepsisters in "Cinderella". However, this disregards the fact that they were collectors, not authors of the tales. Another possible influence is found in stories such as "The Twelve Brothers", which mirrors the brothers' family structure of several brothers facing and overcoming opposition. Some of the tales have autobiographical elements, and according to Zipes the work may have been a "quest" to replace the family life lost after their father died. The collection includes 41 tales about siblings, which Zipes says are representative of Jacob and Wilhelm. Many of the sibling stories follow a simple plot where the characters lose a home, work industriously at a specific task, and in the end find a new home.

=== Editions ===
Between 1812 and 1864, Kinder- und Hausmärchen was published 17 times: seven of the "Large edition" (Große Ausgabe) and ten of the "Small edition" (Kleine Ausgabe). The Large editions contained all the tales collected to date, extensive annotations, and scholarly notes written by the brothers; the Small editions had only 50 tales and were intended for children. Emil Grimm, Jacob and Wilhelm's younger brother, illustrated the Small editions, adding Christian symbolism to the drawings, such as depicting Cinderella's mother as an angel and adding a Bible to the bedside table of Little Red Riding Hood's grandmother.

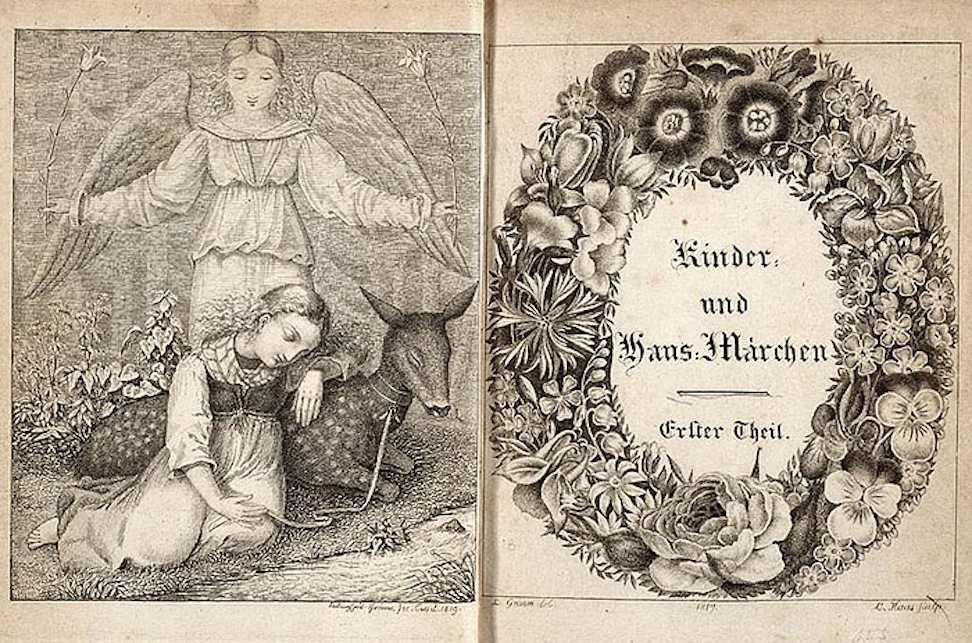
Frontispiece and title-page, illustrated by Ludwig Emil Grimm of the 1819 edition of Kinder- und Hausmärchen

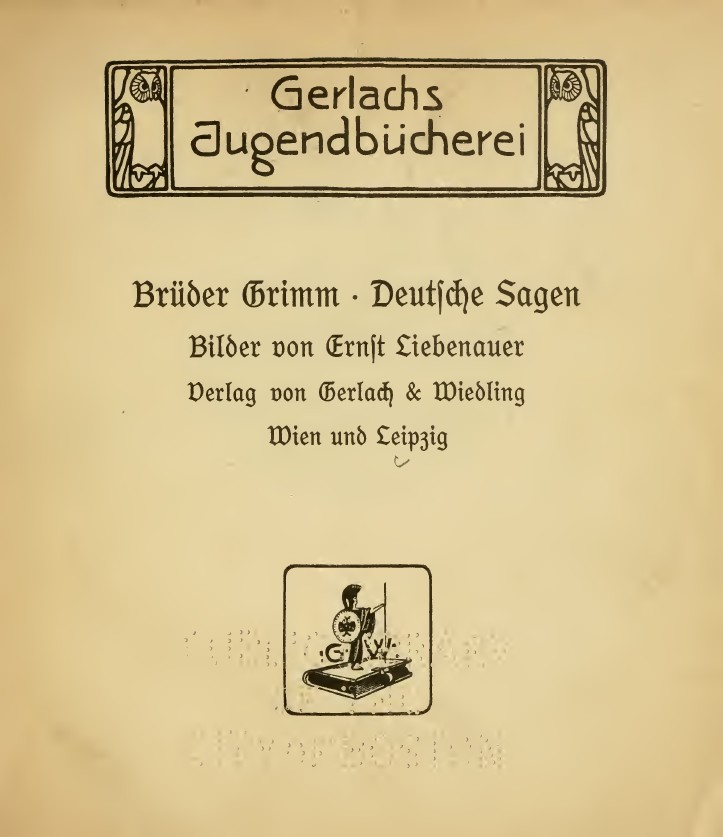
Deutsche Sagen, 1912

The first volume was published in 1812 with 86 folk tales, and a second volume with 70 additional tales was published late in 1814 (dated 1815 on the title page); together the two volumes and their 156 tales are considered the first of the (annotated) Large editions. A second expanded edition with 170 tales was published in 1819, followed in 1822 by a volume of scholarly commentary and annotations. Five more Large editions were published in 1837, 1840, 1843, 1850, and 1857. The seventh and final edition of 1857 contained 211 tales—200 numbered folk tales and 11 legends.

In Germany Kinder- und Hausmärchen, commonly Grimms' Fairy Tales in English, was also released in a "popular poster-sized Bilderbogen (broadsides)" format and in single-story formats for the more popular tales such as "Hansel and Gretel". The stories were often added to collections by other authors without respect to copyright as the tales became a focus of interest for children's book illustrators, with well-known artists such as Arthur Rackham, Walter Crane, and Edmund Dulac illustrating. Another popular edition released in the mid-19th century included elaborate etchings by George Cruikshank. Upon the brothers' deaths, the copyright went to Wilhelm's son Hermann Grimm, who continued the practice of printing the volumes in expensive and complete editions, but after 1893, when copyright lapsed, various publishers began to print the stories in many formats and editions. In the 21st century, Kinder- und Hausmärchen is a universally recognized text. Jacob's and Wilhelm's collection of stories has been translated to more than 160 languages; 120 different editions of the text are available for sale in the US alone.

== Philology ==
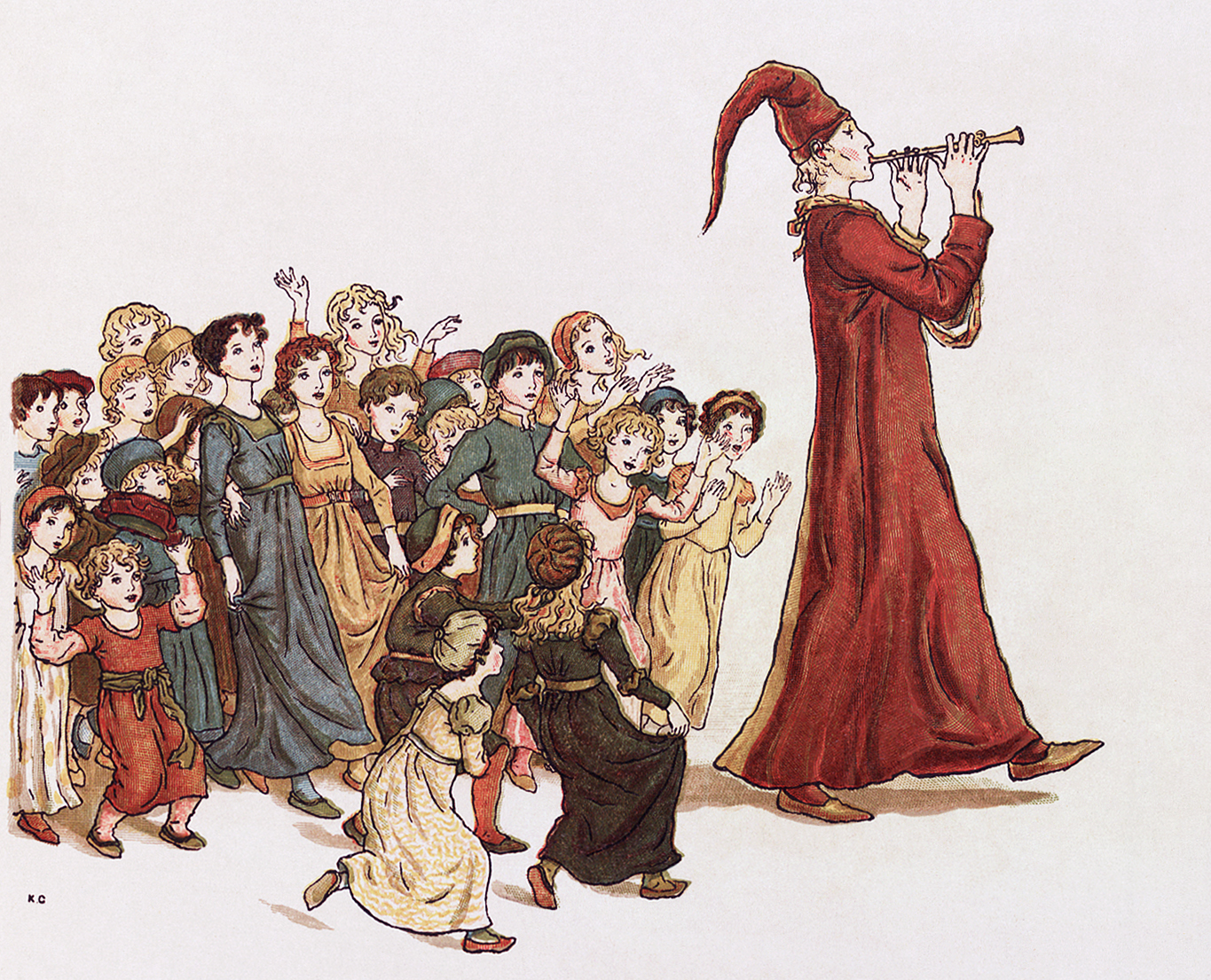
Deutsche Sagen (German Legends) included stories such as "Pied Piper of Hamelin", shown here in an illustration by Kate Greenaway.

While at Marburg University, the brothers came to see culture as tied to language and regarded the purest cultural expression in the grammar of a language. They moved away from Brentano's practice—and that of the other romanticists—who frequently changed original oral styles of folk tale to a more literary style, which the brothers considered artificial. They thought that the style of the people (the Volk) reflected a natural and divinely inspired poetry (Naturpoesie)—as opposed to art poetry (Kunstpoesie), which they saw as artificially constructed. As literary historians and scholars they delved into the origins of stories and attempted to retrieve them from the oral tradition without loss of the original traits of oral language.

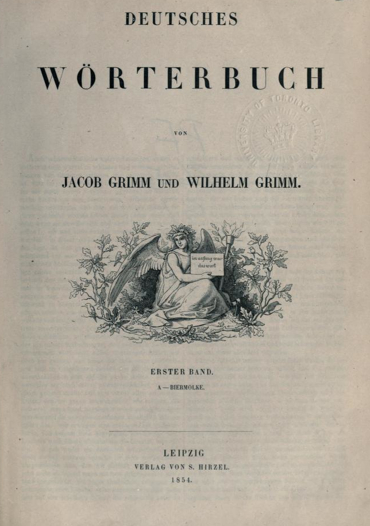
Frontispiece of 1854 edition of German Dictionary (Deutsches Wörterbuch)

The brothers strongly believed that the dream of national unity and independence relied on a full knowledge of the cultural past that was reflected in folklore. They worked to discover and crystallize a kind of Germanness in the stories they collected in the belief that folklore contained kernels of mythologies and legends crucial to understanding the essence of German culture. In examining culture from a philological point of view they sought to establish connections between German law, culture, and local beliefs.

The Grimms considered the tales to have origins in traditional Germanic folklore, which they thought had been "contaminated" by later literary tradition. In the shift from the oral tradition to the printed book, tales were translated from regional dialects to Standard German (Hochdeutsch or High German). But over the course of the many modifications and revisions, the Grimms sought to reintroduce regionalisms, dialects, and Low German to the tales—to reintroduce the language of the original form of the oral tale.

As early as 1812 they published Die beiden ältesten deutschen Gedichte aus dem achten Jahrhundert: Das Lied von Hildebrand und Hadubrand und das Weißenbrunner Gebet (The Two Oldest German Poems of the Eighth Century: The Song of Hildebrand and Hadubrand and the Wessobrunn Prayer); the Wessobrunn Prayer is a ninth-century German prayer, while the Song of Hildebrand and Hadubrand is the earliest-known German heroic song.

Between 1816 and 1818 the brothers published a two-volume work, Deutsche Sagen (German Legends), consisting of 585 German legends. Jacob undertook most of the work of collecting and editing the legends, which he organized according to region and historical (ancient) legends and were about real people or events. The brothers meant it as a scholarly work, but the historical legends were often taken from secondary sources, interpreted, modified, and rewritten—resulting in works "that were regarded as trademarks". Some scholars criticized the Grimms' methodology in collecting and rewriting the legends, yet conceptually they set an example for legend collections that was followed by others throughout Europe. Unlike the collection of folk tales, Deutsche Sagen sold poorly, but Zipes says that the collection, translated to French and Danish in the 19th century but not to English until 1981, is a "vital source for folklorists and critics alike".

Less well known in the English-speaking world is the Grimms' pioneering scholarly work on a German dictionary, the Deutsches Wörterbuch, which they began in 1838. Not until 1852 did they begin publishing the dictionary in installments. The work on the dictionary was not finished in their lifetimes, because in it they gave a history and analysis of each word.

== Reception and legacy ==
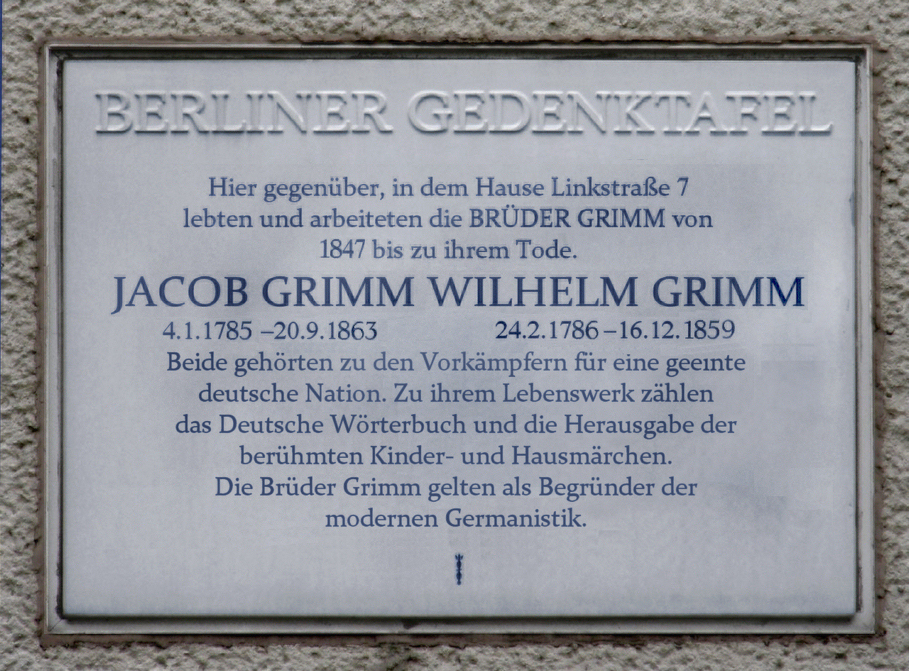
Berlin memorial plaque, Brüder Grimm, Alte Potsdamer Straße 5, Berlin-Tiergarten, Germany

Kinder- und Hausmärchen was not an immediate bestseller but its popularity increased with each new edition. The early editions of the book received lukewarm reviews on the basis that the stories were unappealing, which the brothers responded to with modifications and rewrites in order that the book would have a greater market appeal for children.

By the 1870s the tales had increased greatly in popularity to the point they were added to the teaching curriculum in Prussia and in the 20th century the work has maintained status as being second to the Bible as the most popular book in Germany. The popularity of the tales spawned a mini-industry of critics who analyzed the tales based on folkloric content, literary history, socialism and psychological elements and along Freudian and Jungian lines. Furthermore, the brothers made a science of folklore and generated a model of study that "launched general fieldwork in most European countries". During the Third Reich the Grimms' stories were used to foster nationalism and the Nazi's decreed Kinder- und Hausmärchen was a book each household should own; later in occupied Germany the book was banned for a period.

Simultaneously, in the US, the 1937 release of Walt Disney's Snow White and the Seven Dwarfs shows the triumph of good over evil, innocence over oppression, according to Zipes: a popular theme that Disney repeated in 1959 during the Cold War with the production of Sleeping Beauty. The Grimms' tales have provided much of the early foundation on which the Disney empire was built. In film, the Cinderella motif, the story of a poor girl finding love and success, continues to be repeated in movies such as Pretty Woman, Ever After, Maid in Manhattan, and Ella Enchanted.

In the 20th century educators debated the value and influence of teaching stories that include brutality and violence, causing some of the more grim details to be sanitized. Dégh writes that some educators believe children should be shielded from cruelty of any form, that stories with a happy ending are fine to teach whereas those that are darker, particularly the legends, might pose more harm. On the other hand some educators and psychologist believe children easily discern the difference between what is a story and what is not and that the tales continue to have value for children. The publication of Bruno Bettleheim's 1976 The Uses of Enchantment brought a new wave of interest in the stories as children's literature, with an emphasis on the "therapeutic value for children". More popular stories such as "Hansel and Gretel" and "Little Red Riding Hood" have become staples of modern childhood presented in coloring books, puppet shows and cartoons. Other stories, however, have been considered too gruesome and have not made a popular transition.

Regardless of the debate, the Grimms' stories have continued to be resilient and popular around the world, although a recent study in England appears to suggest that parents consider the stories to be overly violent and inappropriate for young children, writes Libby Copeland for Slate.

=== Teaching and interpretation ===
20th-century educators debated the value and influence of teaching stories that include brutality and violence, and some of the more gruesome details were sanitized.

Dégh writes that some educators, in the belief that children should be shielded from cruelty of any form, believe that stories with a happy ending are fine to teach, whereas those that are darker, particularly the legends, might pose more harm.

On the other hand, some educators and psychologists believe that children easily discern the difference between what is a story and what is not and that the tales continue to have value for children. The publication of Bruno Bettelheim's 1976 The Uses of Enchantment brought a new wave of interest in the stories as children's literature, with an emphasis on the "therapeutic value for children".

More popular stories, such as "Hansel and Gretel" and "Little Red Riding Hood", have become staples of modern childhood, presented in coloring books, puppet shows, and cartoons. Other stories have been considered too gruesome and have not made a popular transition.

Regardless, the Grimms' stories continue to be popular around the world, although a recent study in England appears to suggest that parents consider the stories overly violent and inappropriate for young children.

=== Popular culture and legacy ===
Nevertheless, children remain enamored of the Grimms' fairy tales with the brothers themselves embraced as the creators of the stories and even as part of the stories themselves. The film The Brothers Grimm imagines them as con artists exploiting superstitious German peasants until they are asked to confront a genuine fairy-tale curse that calls them to finally be heroes.

The movie Ever After shows the Grimms in their role as collectors of fairy tales, though they learn to their surprise that at least one of their stories (Cinderella) is true. Grimm follows a detective who discovers that he is a Grimm, the latest in a line of guardians who are sworn to keep the balance between humanity and mythological creatures. Ever After High imagines Grimm Brothers (here called Milton and Giles) as the headmasters of the Ever After High boarding school, where they train the children of the previous generation of fairy tales to follow in their parents' footsteps.

In the 10th Kingdom miniseries, the brothers are trapped for years in the fairy-tale world on the 9 Kingdoms, where they witnessed the events that they would record as stories upon finally making it back to the real world. The Sisters Grimm book series follows their descendants, Sabrina and Daphne Grimm, as they adapt to life in Ferryport Landing, a town in upstate New York populated by fairy-tale people.

Separate from the previous series is the Land of Stories book series which also features the idea of "Sisters Grimm". In The Land of Stories, the Grimm Brothers' female descendants are a self-described coven determined to track down and document creatures from the fairy-tale world that cross over to the real world. Jacob and Wilhelm Grimm were, in this story, chosen by Mother Goose and others to tell fairy tales so that they might give hope to the human race.

The university library at the Humboldt University of Berlin is housed in the Jacob and Wilhelm Grimm Center (Jakob-und-Wilhelm-Grimm-Zentrum); among its collections is a large portion of the Grimms' private library.

== Collaborative works ==
- Die beiden ältesten deutschen Gedichte aus dem achten Jahrhundert: Das Lied von Hildebrand und Hadubrand und das Weißenbrunner Gebet (The Two Oldest German Poems of the Eighth Century: The Song of Hildebrand and Hadubrand and the Wessobrunn Prayer)—ninth century heroic song, published 1812
- Kinder- und Hausmärchen (Children's and Household Tales)—seven editions, between 1812 and 1857
- Altdeutsche Wälder (Old German Forests)—three volumes between 1813 and 1816
- Der arme Heinrich von Hartmann von der Aue (Poor Heinrich by Hartmann von der Aue)—1815
- Lieder der alten Edda (Songs from the Elder Edda)—1815
- Deutsche Sagen (German Sagas)—published in two parts between 1816 and 1818
- Irische Elfenmärchen (Irish Elf Fairy Tales)—Grimms' translation of Thomas Crofton Croker's Fairy Legends and Traditions of the South of Ireland, 1826
- Deutsches Wörterbuch (German Dictionary)—32 volumes published between 1852 and 1960

== See also ==
- Grimm Family Tree
- Hans Christian Andersen
- Alexander Afanasyev
- Charles Perrault
- Giambattista Basile
- Norwegian Folktales
- Russian fairy tale
- Grimm's law - Jacob's contribution to Proto-Indo-European studies

== Sources ==
- Alister, Ian; Hauke, Christopher, eds. (1998). Contemporary Jungian Analysis. London: Routledge. ISBN 978-0-415-14166-6.
- Bottigheimer, Ruth (1982). "Tale Spinners: Submerged Voices in Grimms' Fairy Tales". New German Critique. 27 (27): 141–150. doi:10.2307/487989. JSTOR 487989.
- Dégh, Linda (1979). "Grimm's Household Tales and its Place in the Household". Western Folklore. 38 (2): 85–103. doi:10.2307/1498562. JSTOR 1498562.
- Haase, Donald (2008). "Literary Fairy Tales". In Donald Haase (ed.). The Greenwood encyclopedia of folktales and fairy tales. Vol. 2. Westport, Connecticut: Greenwood Publishing Group. ISBN 978-0-313-33441-2.
- Hettinga, Donald (2001). The Brothers Grimm. New York: Clarion. ISBN 978-0-618-05599-9.
- Jean, Lydie (2007). "Charles Perrault's Paradox: How Aristocratic Fairy Tales became Synonymous with Folklore Conservation". Trames. 11 (61): 276–283. doi:10.3176/tr.2007.3.03.
- Joosen, Vanessa (2006). The Oxford Encyclopaedia of Children's Literature. Oxford: Oxford University Press. ISBN 978-0-19-514656-1.
- Michaelis-Jena, Ruth (1970). The Brothers Grimm. London: Routledge & Kegan Paul. ISBN 978-0-7100-6449-3.
- Murphy, Ronald G. (2000). The Owl, the Raven, and the Dove. Oxford University Press. ISBN 978-0-19-515169-5.
- Robinson, Orrin W. (2004). "Rhymes and Reasons in the Grimms' Kinder- und Hausmärchen". The German Quarterly. 77 (1): 47–58.
- Tatar, Maria (2004). The Annotated Brothers Grimm. W.W. Norton & Co. ISBN 978-0-393-05848-2.
- Tatar, Maria (1987). The Hard Facts of the Grimms' Fairy Tales. Princeton University Press. ISBN 978-0-691-06722-3.
- Tatar, Maria (2010). "Why Fairy Tales Matter: The Performative and the Transformative". Western Folklore. 69 (1): 55–64.
- Zipes, Jack (1994). Myth as Fairy Tale. Kentucky University Press. ISBN 978-0-8131-1890-1.
- Zipes, Jack (1988). The Brothers Grimm: From Enchanted Forests to the Modern World (1st ed.). Routledge. ISBN 978-0-415-90081-2.
- Zipes, Jack (2002). The Brothers Grimm: From Enchanted Forests to the Modern World (2nd ed.). Routledge. ISBN 978-0-312-29380-2.
- Zipes, Jack (1984). "The Grimm German Legends in English". Children's Literature. 12: 162–166. doi:10.1353/chl.0.0073.
- Zipes, Jack (2014). The Original Folk and Fairy Tales of The Brothers Grimm. Princeton University Press. ISBN 978-0-691-16059-7.
- Zipes, Jack (2000). The Oxford Companion to Fairy Tales. Oxford University Press. ISBN 978-0-19-860115-9.
