= Hastings-on-Hudson Union Free School District =

School district in New York State

Hastings-on-Hudson Union Free School District is a school district headquartered in Hastings-on-Hudson, New York.

Its boundary includes Hastings-on-Hudson.

== Administrators ==
William McKersie, Ph.D. is the current superintendent. The Assistant Superintendent Curriculum & Instruction is Melissa Szymanski, Ed.D.

== Demographics ==
In 2018, 77% of the district's students were non-Hispanic white.

== Schools ==
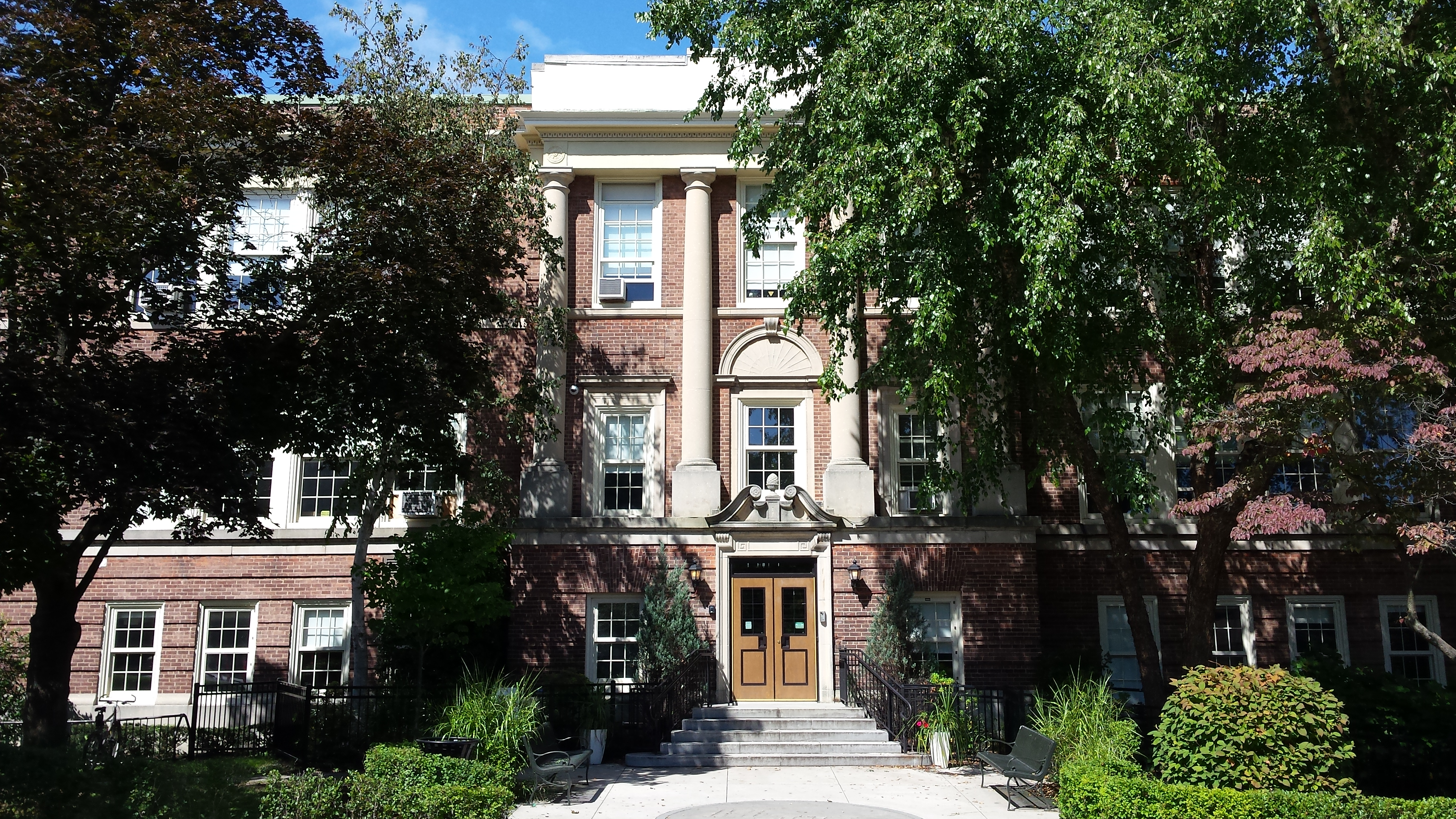
Hastings High School (HHS) Farragut Middle School (FMS)

- Hastings High School (HHS)
- Farragut Middle School (FMS)
  - The middle school began a course called "Sparking Courageous Conversations" in 2018, where the topic of race was addressed.
  - In 2026, the school came under fire because they taught a course about the Israel-Hamas war. However, the school pledged to keep this program.
- Hillside Elementary School (HES)
