= Hastings High School (New York) =

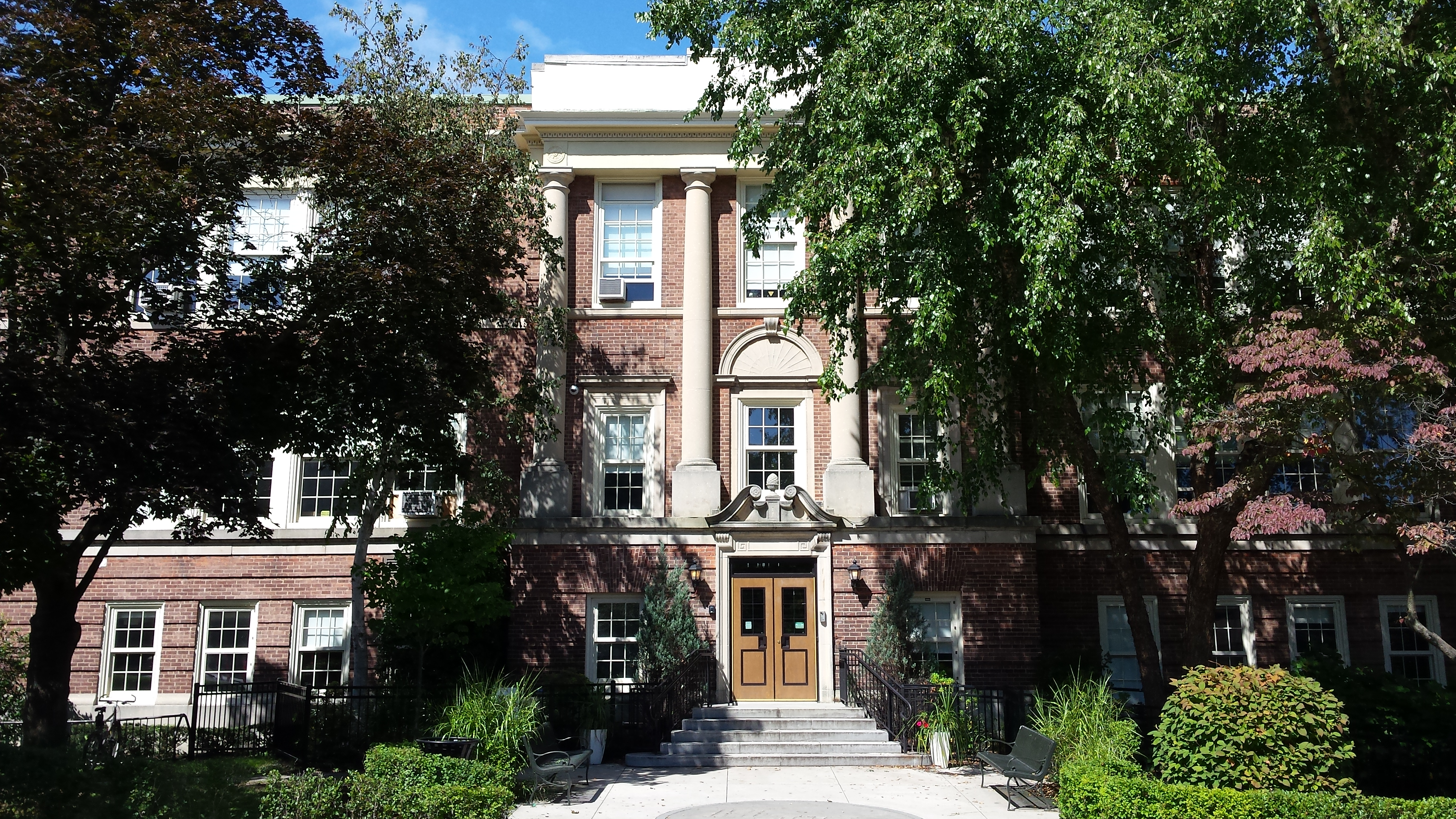

Location
- One Mount Hope Boulevard; Hastings-on-Hudson,, New York 10706; United States; 40°59′40″N 73°52′20″W

Information
- Type: Public
- Motto: Primus Inter Pares (First Among Equals)
- Established: 1905
- School district: Hastings-on-Hudson Union Free School District
- Superintendent: William S. McKersie
- Principal: Andrew Clayman
- Staff: 51.22 (on an FTE basis)
- Grades: 9–12
- Enrollment: 525 (2026–27)
- Student to teacher ratio: 10.25
- Colors: Green and Gold
- Mascot: Yellow jacket
- Newspaper: The Buzzer
- Feeder schools: Farragut Middle School
- Website: hhs.hohschools.org

Hastings High School (HHS) is a comprehensive public high school and the only high school of the Hastings-on-Hudson Union Free School District in Westchester County, New York. The principal is Andrew Clayman.

== History ==
The class of 1908 was the first graduating class of Hastings High School.

== Extracurricular activities ==
=== Theater ===
Hastings High School received a $10,000 grant from a division of the National Broadcasting Corporation to put on a production of Hairspray.

=== Athletics ===
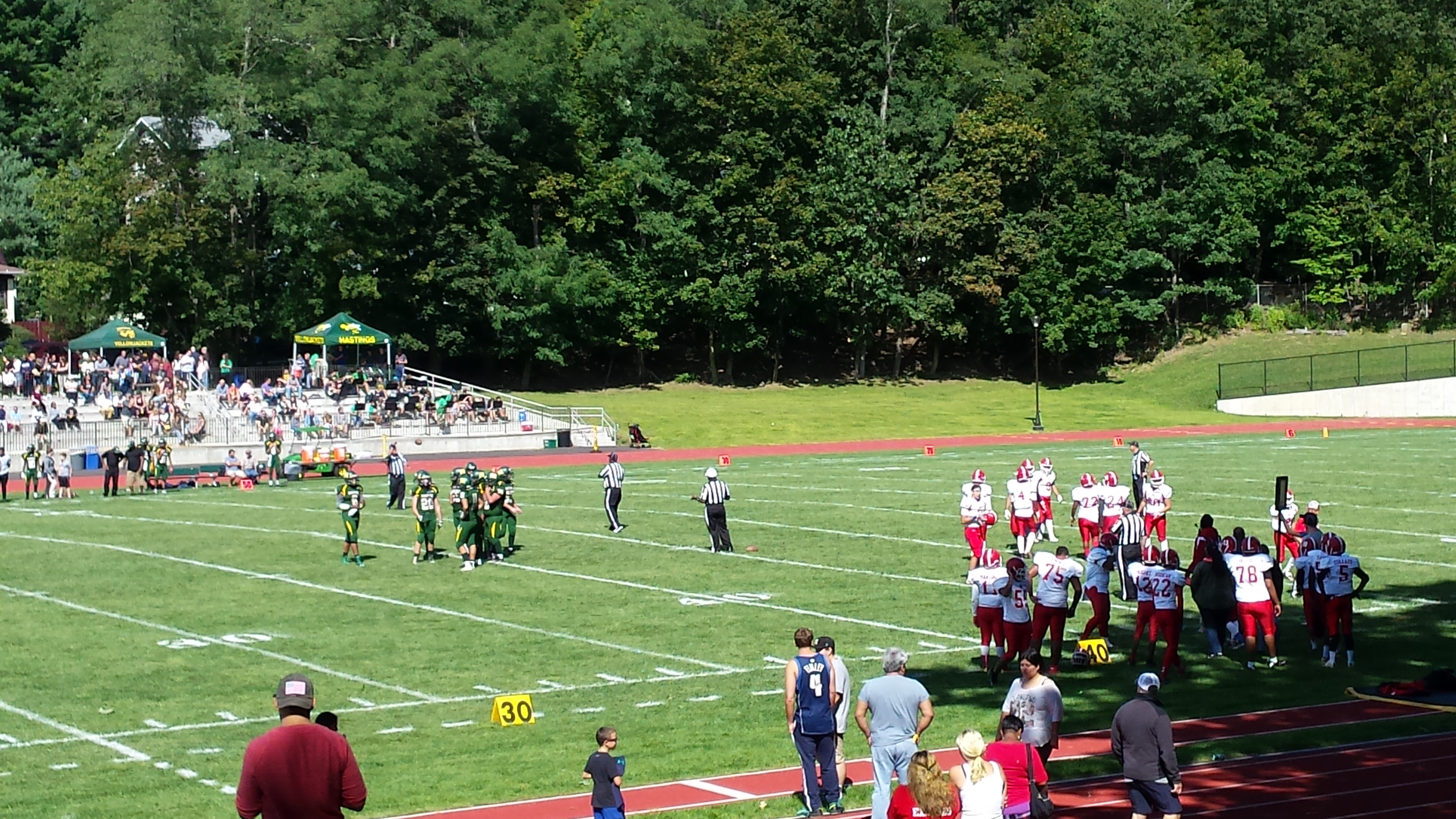
The Hastings High School football team plays Yonkers Montessori Academy at Reynolds Field

Hastings is a member of the New York State Public High School Athletic Association. The Hastings Athletics Department has been recognized by the Journal News as recipients of the NHSCSA Sportsmen Medallion for their outstanding efforts in both Crowd Attendance and Spirit. The Student Section, also known as the "Cochran Crazies," has been awarded the TFS Scholar Creative Minds Award recognized by the Section 1 Athletic Committee in 2006.

=== The Buzzer ===
Hastings High School's newspaper; it has been represented by its Editorial Staffs at the Columbia Scholastic Press Association's Annual Conference at Columbia University, the Young Author's Conference of 2007, and "Journalism That Matters: The DC Sessions" at The George Washington University.

== Awards and recognition ==
Hastings High School was a recipient of the U.S. Department of Education's National Blue Ribbon Award for excellence for 2001–2002 and for 2016–2017.

=== Rankings ===
In 2015, Hastings High School was ranked 162nd on Newsweek's ranking of the top US high schools.

== Notable alumni ==
- Stephen Collins, actor
- Libby Copeland, reporter for the Washington Post
- Ricki Lake (born 1968), actress, television presenter and producer
- Ali Marpet (born 1993), American football center for the Tampa Bay Buccaneers of the National Football League (NFL)
- Robert Meeropol (born 1947), son of Ethel and Julius Rosenberg
- Dave Rice (born c. 1940), college football coach
- Benh Zeitlin (born 1982), filmmaker, composer, and animator
- John Dehner (born 1915), stage, radio, film, and television actor
- Edmund Phelps (born 1933), recipient of 2006 Nobel Prize in Economics
- Phil Weiser (born 1968), governor-elect of Colorado
