= Bombing of Hanau in World War II =

Hanau, Germany was bombed by British bombers (277 Lancasters and 8 Mosquitos of Nos 1 and 8 Groups) on 19 March 1945 during World War II, a few days before it was taken by the US Army. 85% of the city was destroyed. Hanau lost its old monuments, and the medieval section of the city was levelled. The ancient castle, arsenal, city theater and the birthhouse of the Grimm brothers were destroyed. Only half of the Walloon church still stands today. Hanau became a major garrison town in the late 19th century and was (and is) an important junction on the German railway system.
