= Borf =

Graffiti campaign in the United States

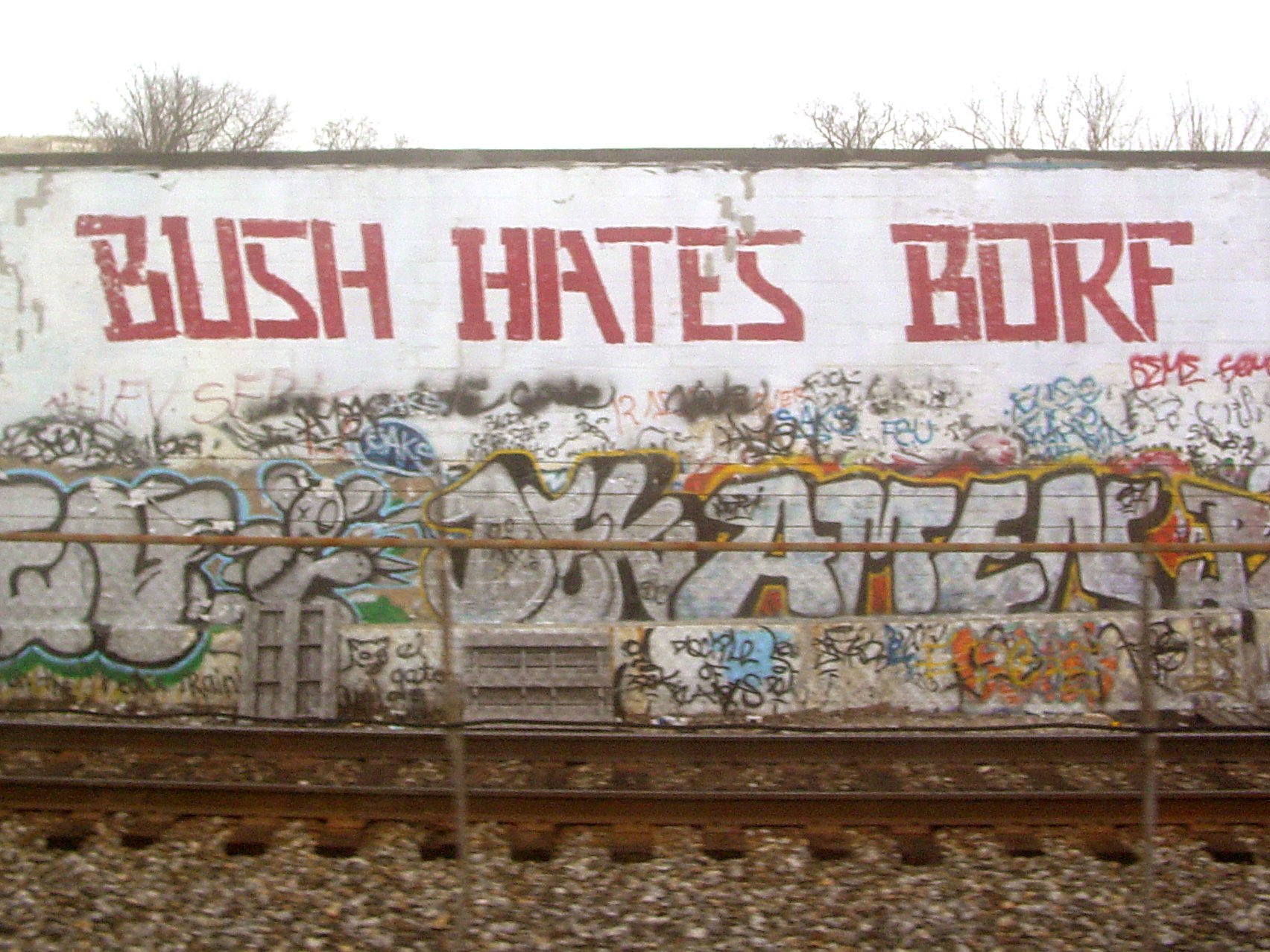
"Bush hates Borf" message painted on the Vision Lighting building near the Takoma Metro station. This message was changed to "Obama Hates Borf" in 2009.

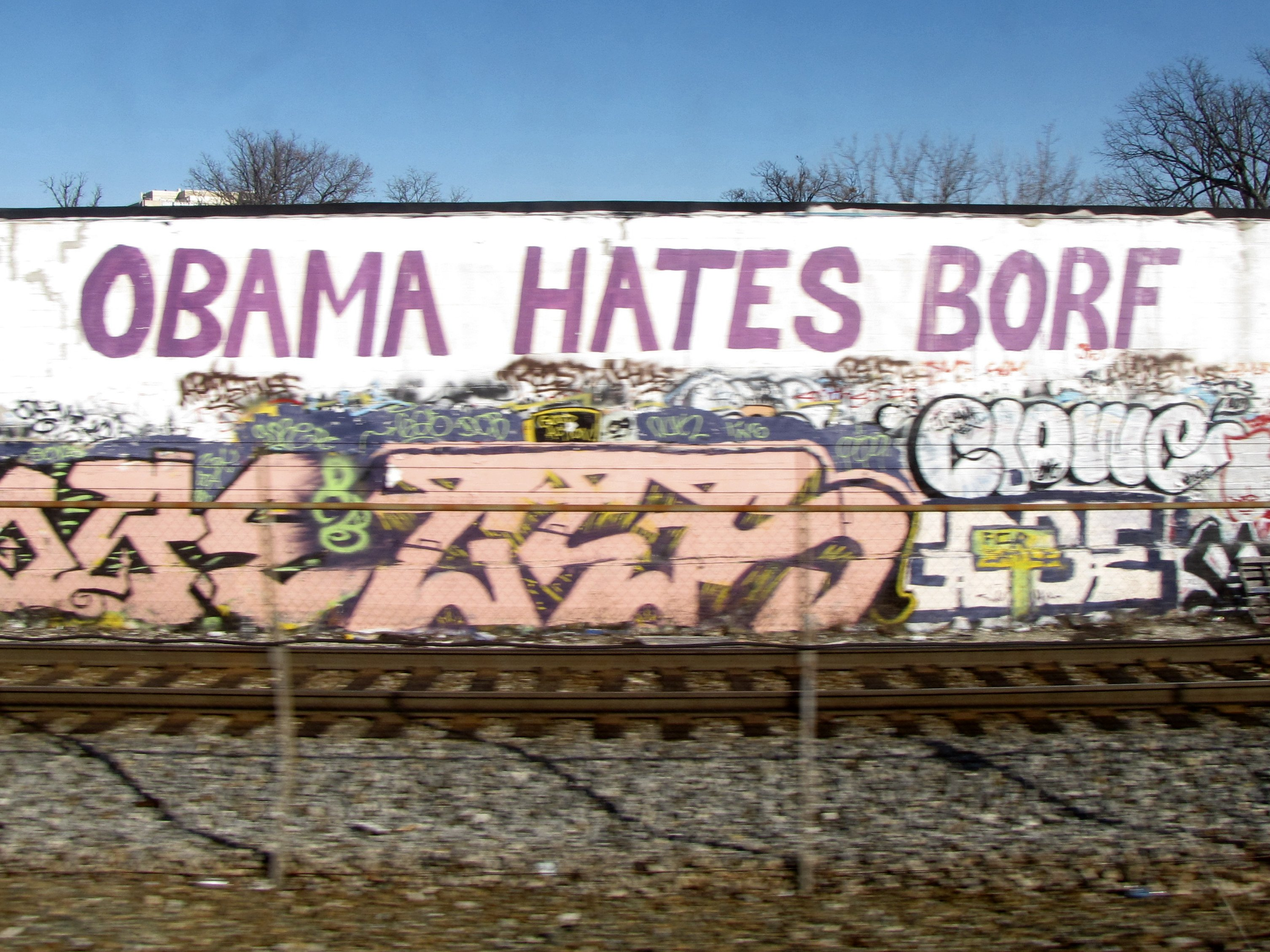
"Obama hates Borf" message, which replaced the earlier message in 2009.

Borf was a graffiti campaign seen in and around Washington, D.C., during 2004 and 2005, carried out by John Tsombikos while studying at the Corcoran College of Art and Design. This four-letter word was ubiquitous around the Northwest quadrant of Washington, and ranged from simple tagging to complete sentences to two-color stencils to the massive defacement on an overhead exit sign from the Theodore Roosevelt Bridge to Constitution Avenue. Tsombikos was arrested on July 13, 2005, after tips led police to his latest tag.

One of the most visible tags was the "BUSH HATES BORF" message painted above other graffiti on the back wall of the Vision Lighting Building and visible from the Metro Red Line near the Takoma Metro station. This message was later replaced by a message saying "OBAMA HATES BORF" in early 2009. Then in late 2011, the notorious icon of Washington, D.C., culture was seen for the last time and finally painted over during the week of November 28.

The graffiti was also reported to have appeared in New York City, San Francisco, Raleigh, North Carolina, Rome, Italy, and elsewhere.

In 2009, director Paris Bustillos created a documentary film about the campaign entitled Borf!.

== Rationale ==
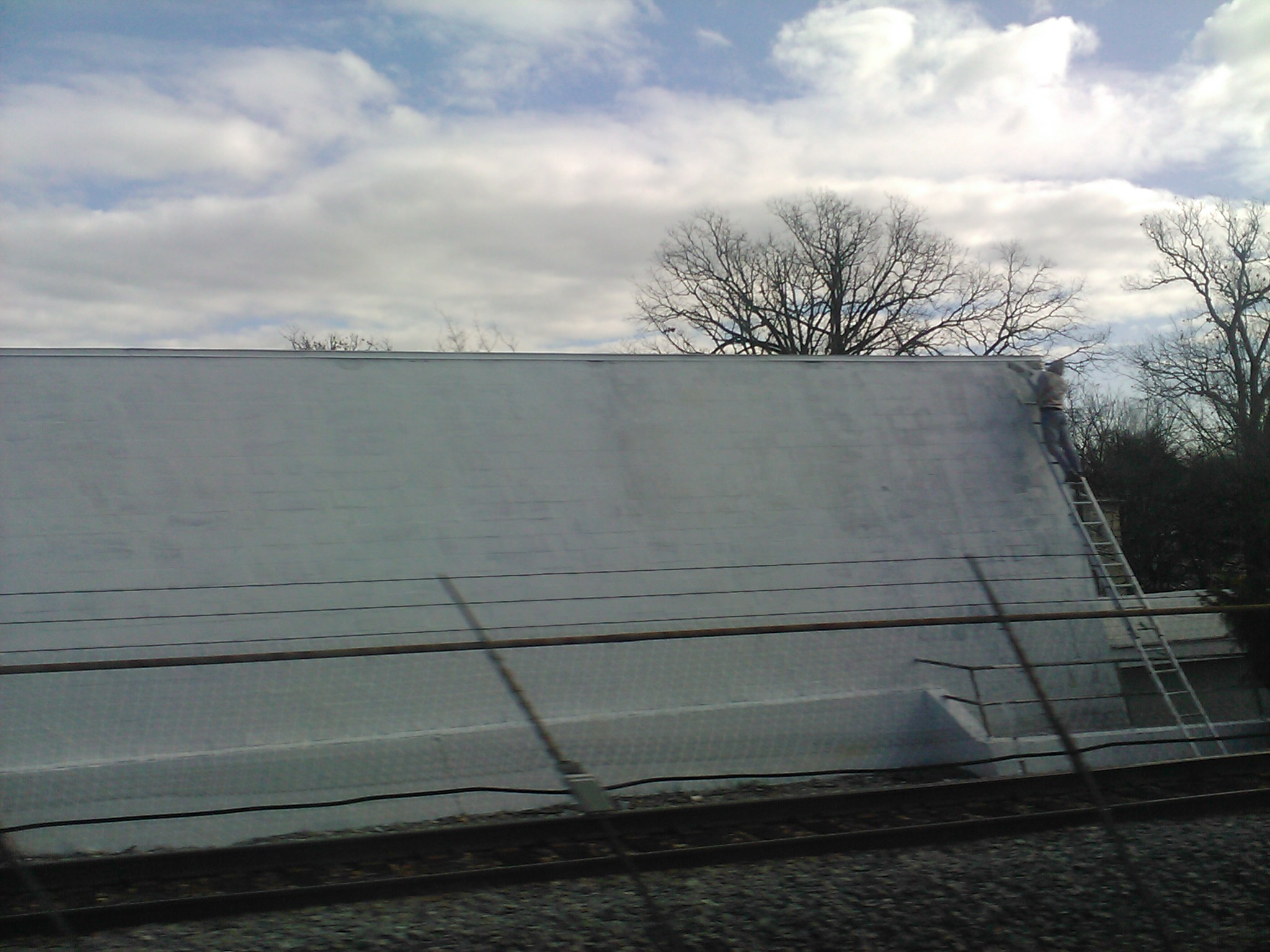
A worker painting over the iconic 'Obama Hates Borf' graffiti near the Takoma Metro subway station, on November 30th, 2011 at 10:20am.

The campaign attracted widespread attention without first explaining its motivations. According to Tsombikos and subsequent Borf communiqués, both the nickname "Borf" and the Borf face belonged to Bobby Fisher, a close friend of Tsombikos' who had committed suicide. In a video shown on July 29, 2006, the Borf Brigade – the group claiming responsibility for the graffiti spree – asserted that capitalism and the culture of aesthetics created alienation and feelings of worthlessness that contributed to the 16-year-old's suicide. The group said that they used other peoples' property to commemorate and pay homage to their deceased friend. The graffiti usually had overtones of anti-authority sentiments and youth liberation.

== Court appearance ==
Approximately four months after his arrest, Tsombikos appeared before the Superior Court of the District of Columbia. His paint-stained coat, which resembled one that he wore in Libby Copeland's July 14 article in The Washington Post (published after his arrest), was declared evidence by the judge and handed over to the prosecution.

On December 12, 2005, Tsombikos agreed to plead guilty to one count of felony destruction of property. He also agreed to perform community service (cleaning up graffiti) and to pay $12,000 in restitution. Judge Leibovitz ordered him to stay out of the District except for court appearances and classes at the Corcoran College of Art and Design.

On February 9, 2006, Tsombikos was sentenced to 30 days in the D.C. jail, with an additional 17 months suspended, as well as the community service and restitution specified in his plea agreement. At his sentencing, the judge said, "You profess to despise rich people. You profess to despise the faceless, nameless forms of government that oppress. That's what you've become. That's what you are. You're a rich kid who comes into Washington and defaces property because you feel like it. It's not fair. It's not right."

== Communiqués ==
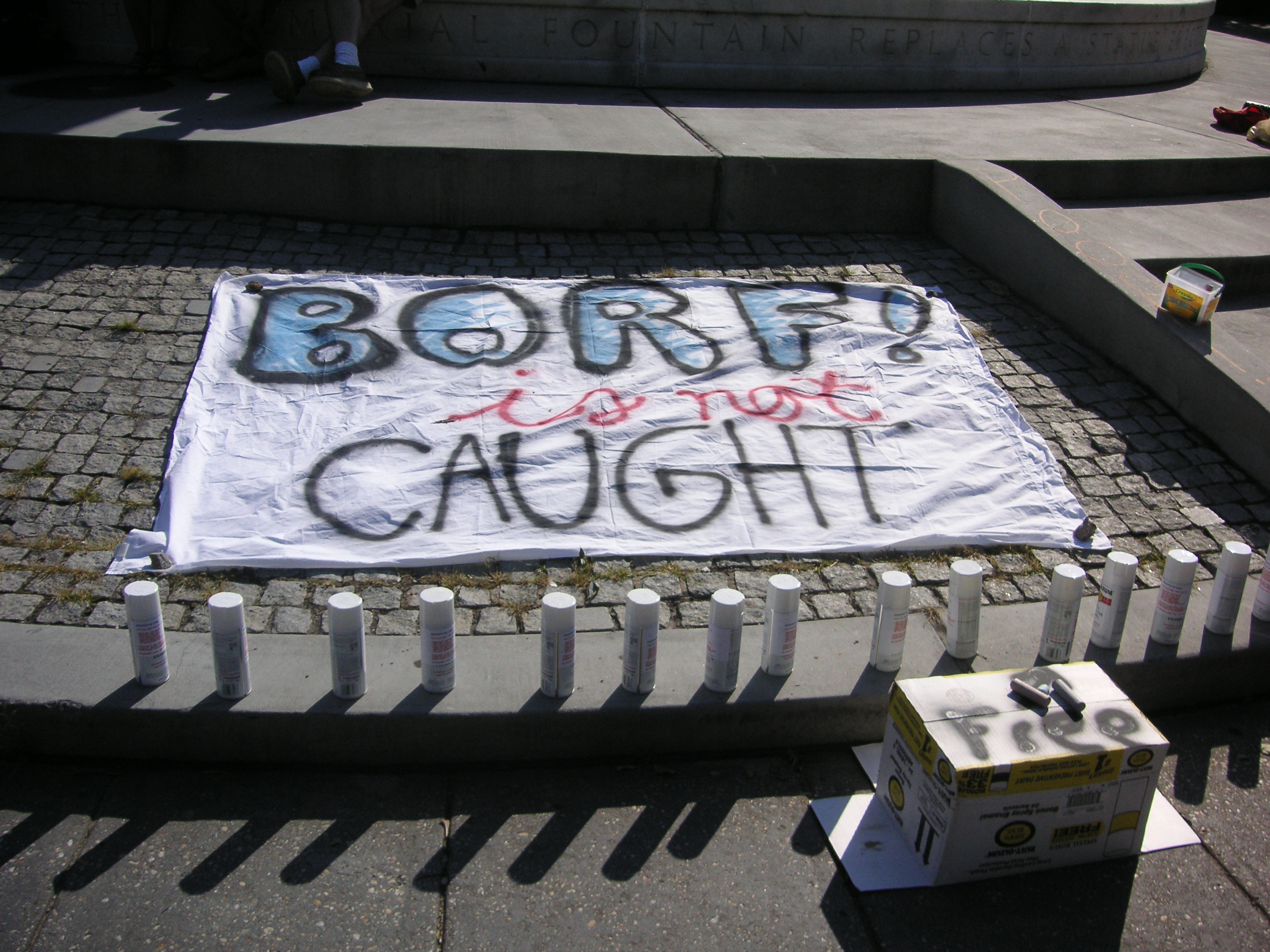
Borf is not caught!

At a Dupont Circle event after Borf's arrest, young people distributed spray paint and anarchist pamphlets. The following was distributed as a "communiqué" at the event:

Borf is not caught. Borf is many. Borf is none. Borf is waiting for you in your car. Borf is in your pockets. Borf is running through your veins. Borf is naive. Borf is good for your liver. Borf is controlling your thoughts. Borf is everywhere. Borf is the war on boredom. Borf annihilates. Borf hates school. Borf is a four letter word for joy. Borf is quickly losing patience. Borf yells in the library. Borf eats pieces of shit like you for breakfast. Borf is digging a hole to China. Borf is bad at graffiti. Borf is ephemeral. Borf is invincible. Borf. Borf ruins everything. Borf runs near the swimming pool. Borf keeps it real. Borf writes you love letters. Ol' Dirty Bastard is Borf. Borf knows everything. Borf is in the water. Borf doesn't sleep. Borf systematically attacks the infrastructure of the totality. Borf is a foulmouth. Borf eats your homework. Borf brings you home for dinner. Borf is the dirt under your fingernails. Borf is the song that never ends. Borf gets down. Borf gets up. Borf is your baby. Borf is neither. Borf is good for your heart, the more you eat the more you. Borf is. Borf knows. Borf destroys. Borf is immortal. Borf pulls fire alarms. Borf scuffs the gym floor. Borf is looking through your mom's purse. Borf is M. Borf is the size of Alaska. Borf likes pizza. Borf is in general. Borf is X. Borf ain't nothin' to fuck with. Borf runs it. Borf has reflexes like a cat. Borf is immortal. Borf sticks gum under the desk. Borf is omnipotent. Borf is flawed. Borf is winning.

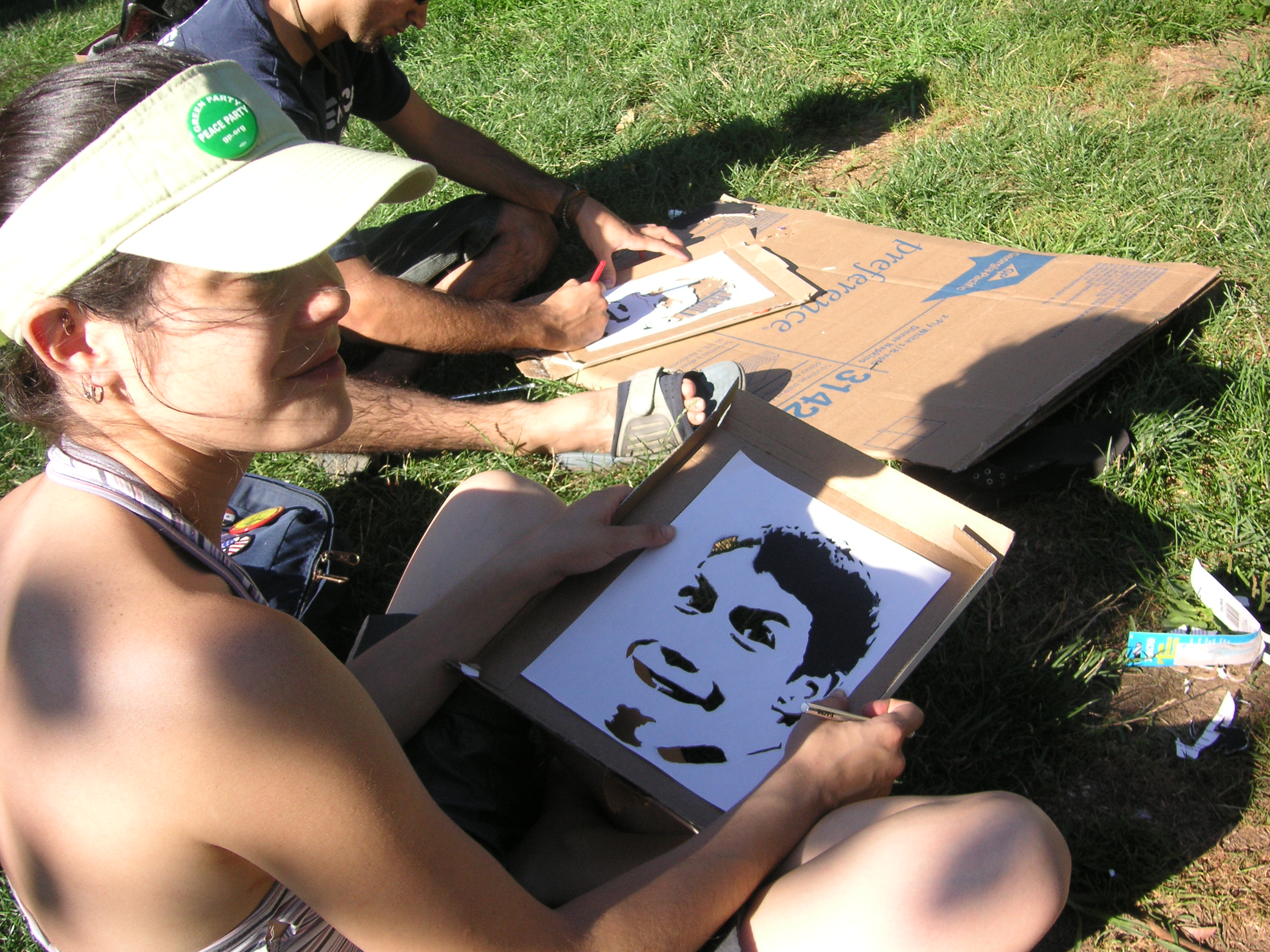
The Borf face

On July 29, 2006, a group of young people calling themselves the "Borf Brigade" held a march in the Shaw neighborhood of Washington, and projected a "video communiqué" on a wall in which a young woman wearing a Zapatista-style face mask read a statement labeling Tsombikos a "minor Borfist" and announced that he had been "purged" from the group. The video also said,

On October 22, 2003, our friend Borf hanged himself from a basement pipe in a suburb of the nation's capital. This was not a solitary act. Over 30,000 people in the U.S. alone fall victim to this conspiratorial violence. It is the third leading killer of young people ages 15-24, and outnumbers homicides 3 to 2. This epidemic cannot be medicated into remission. It is not a problem confined to our family bloodline. "Trouble at home" is not the only trigger for depression.

== Consolation of Ruin art show ==
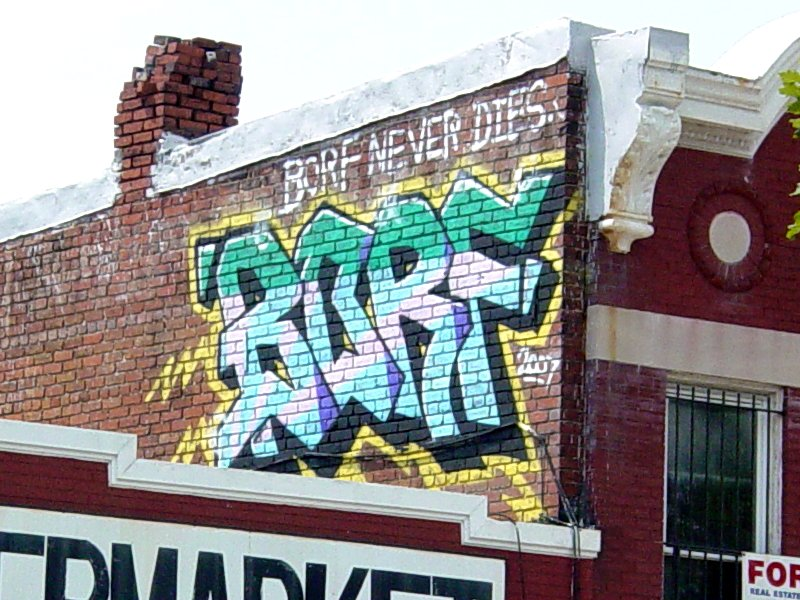
Borf piece on the side of the Bobby Fisher Memorial Building in Washington, D.C.

In April 2007, wheat-pasted posters announcing a "BORF SHOW" slated for the weekends of May 18–20 and May 25–27 began appearing around Washington. The location was "The Bobby Fisher Memorial Building" at 1644 North Capitol Street NW.

The show, entitled "Consolation of Ruin" and sponsored by philanthropist Chuck Burgundy, featured two floors of oil paintings, screen prints, etchings, installations, and video, all for sale in an effort to pay for Tsombikos' $12,000 restitution. One installation (a direct reference to Banksy's "elephant in the room" piece) was of a male figure hanging from a belt from the ceiling and painted to match the wallpaper designs on the wall, camouflaging the lifeless figure. A number of the original stencils used in the graffiti campaign were on display.

After the Borf show, the Bobby Fisher Memorial Building served as a youth-oriented space for music and art until its closing in July 2008.

== See also ==
- Banksy
- Sanki King
- Cool "Disco" Dan
- Culture jamming
