= Libby Copeland =

American journalist (born 1976)

- Born: 1976 (age 49–50)
- Education: University of Pennsylvania
- Occupation: Freelance journalist

Libby Copeland (born 1976) is a freelance writer in New York City, and was previously a staff writer for the Washington Post. She started her career with the Post in 1998 as an intern in the style department, and went on to cover culture, crime and Washington politics. In 2005, she was the Feature Specialty Reporting winner for the large circulation papers in the American Association of Sunday and Feature Editors' annual competition. In 2009, she left the Post and moved to New York. Since becoming a freelancer, she has become a regular contributor to Slate, and has written for the New York magazine, the Wall Street Journal and Cosmopolitan, among other publications. She has appeared on MSNBC, CNN and NPR.

== Early life and education ==
Copeland was born in 1976. She is an alumna of Hastings High School of Hastings-on-Hudson, New York. She went on to major in English at the University of Pennsylvania where she won the Thouron Award in her junior year.

== Career ==
Copeland's freelance work has included a number of pieces on gender and politics for Slate, a piece on product placement for New York, and for Cosmo, an in-depth recounting of a gruesome murder in a D.C.-area Lululemon store.

For Style, the daily features section of the Washington Post, Copeland covered the 2005 Michael Jackson molestation trial, the 2006 Winter Olympics in Turin, Italy, and the 2008 presidential election. Copeland wrote primarily about the McCain and Edwards campaigns during the 2008 election, and profiled political figures including Joe and Jill Biden and Cindy and Meghan McCain. Her coverage of the 2006 Congressional mid-term elections has also been both lauded and enthusiastically criticized by the blogging community, and Wonkette called one of her pieces "fawning." She wrote articles for the Washington Post about Washington, D.C. area graffiti artist Borf and has been the subject of some graffiti saying "Libby Copeland Writes Lies," possibly in connection with the Borf issue. During the 2006 Winter Olympics in Turin, Italy, she wrote about figure skater Johnny Weir's free-wheeling shopping habits. In 2003, she wrote about modern-day Jersey "dandys" bent on reclaiming the slur "guido," prompting some controversy. She profiled Matt Damon, and skewered the popular girls' retailer Club Libby Lu.

Copeland has a book being released in March 2020 about the subject of commercial genetic testing and its impact on traditional concepts of family.
