= Gut Holzhausen =

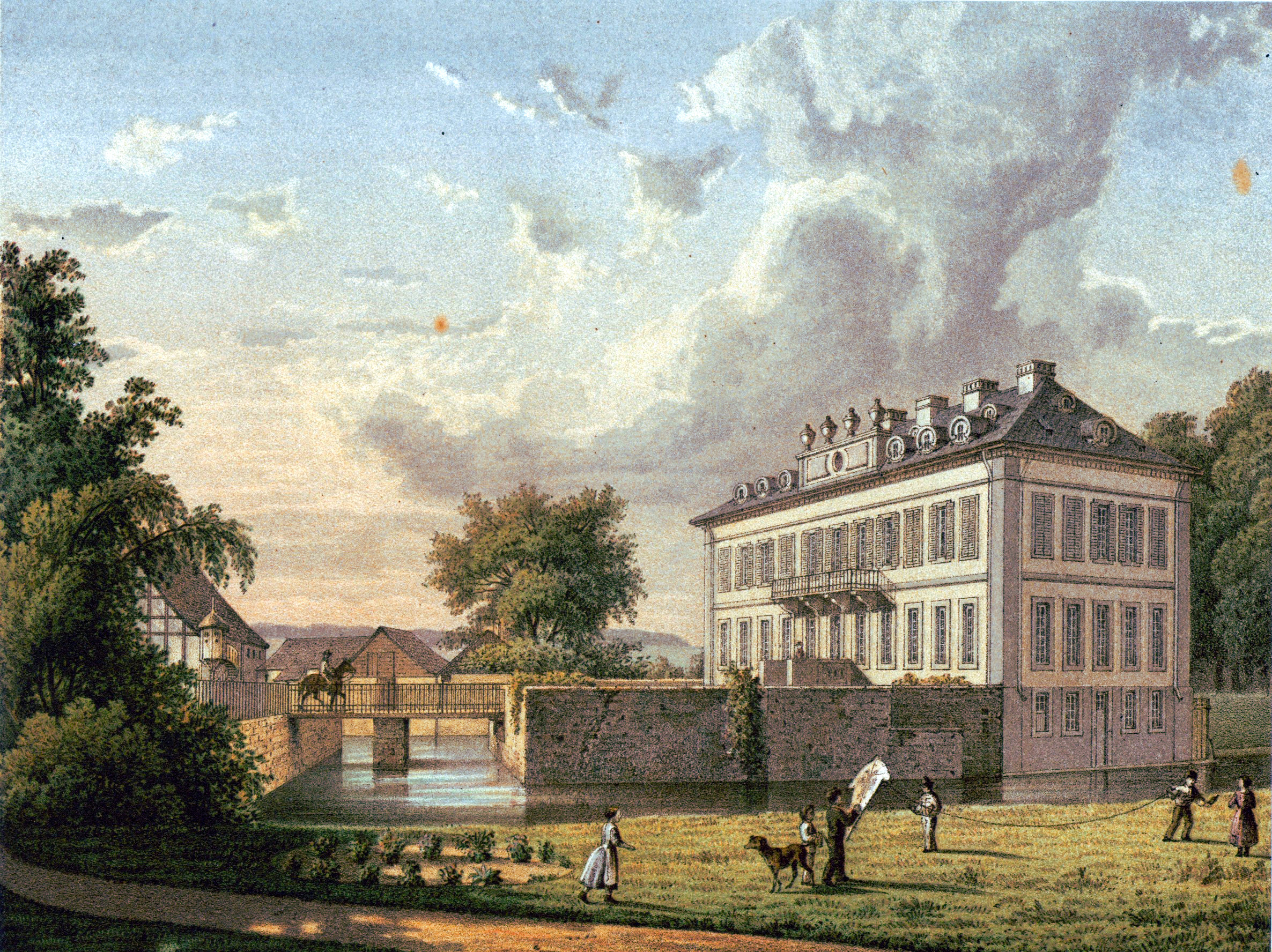
- Rittergut Holzhausen c. 1860, Collection Alexander Duncker
- Alternative names: Rittergut Holzhausen; Kulturgut Holzhausen

General information
- Status: Farm; Festival venue
- Location: Nieheim, North Rhine-Westphalia, Germany
- Coordinates: 51.7903°N 9.1362°E
- Construction started: 1801

Design and construction
- Architect: Wilhelm Carl Hisner

Gut Holzhausen is an estate and manor house (Gut) in Holzhausen, part of Nieheim, North Rhine-Westphalia, Germany. The present buildings of the estate, which goes back to the 14th century, were mostly built in the 19th century. The estate is a listed monument. It is used for biodynamic farming, and also a venue of community events, such as a culture festival called Voices.

== History and architecture ==
The first building was a moated castle from 1312, which was owned from 1484 by the von der Borch family. It consisted of a manor house and a Vorburg. Documented from 1483, the Borch family was resident on the estate, given as a fief of Bishop Simon III zur Lippe, the head of the Diocese of Paderborn.

Some of the present buildings date back to the 16th century. When the moated castle was destroyed by a fire, the Borch family erected a manor house in Neoclassical style, built from 1801 to 1809 by Wilhelm Carl Hisner, an architect from Kassel, within the former moat.

Close to the manor house are four stables. The estate is well preserved and a listed monument. It is still used as a farm, following the standards of the Demeter organisation for biodynamic agriculture. It is also a venue of community events, such as a Christmas market, school theatre festivals and a regular culture festival called Voices.

In 1999, the film Die Einsamkeit der Krokodile by Jobst Oetzmann was filmed on the premises and in the area. The 2018 Voices festival opened with a concert of the Nordwestdeutsche Philharmonie, soprano Sara Hershkowitz singing songs by Richard Strauss.
