= Sara Hershkowitz =

American coloratura soprano

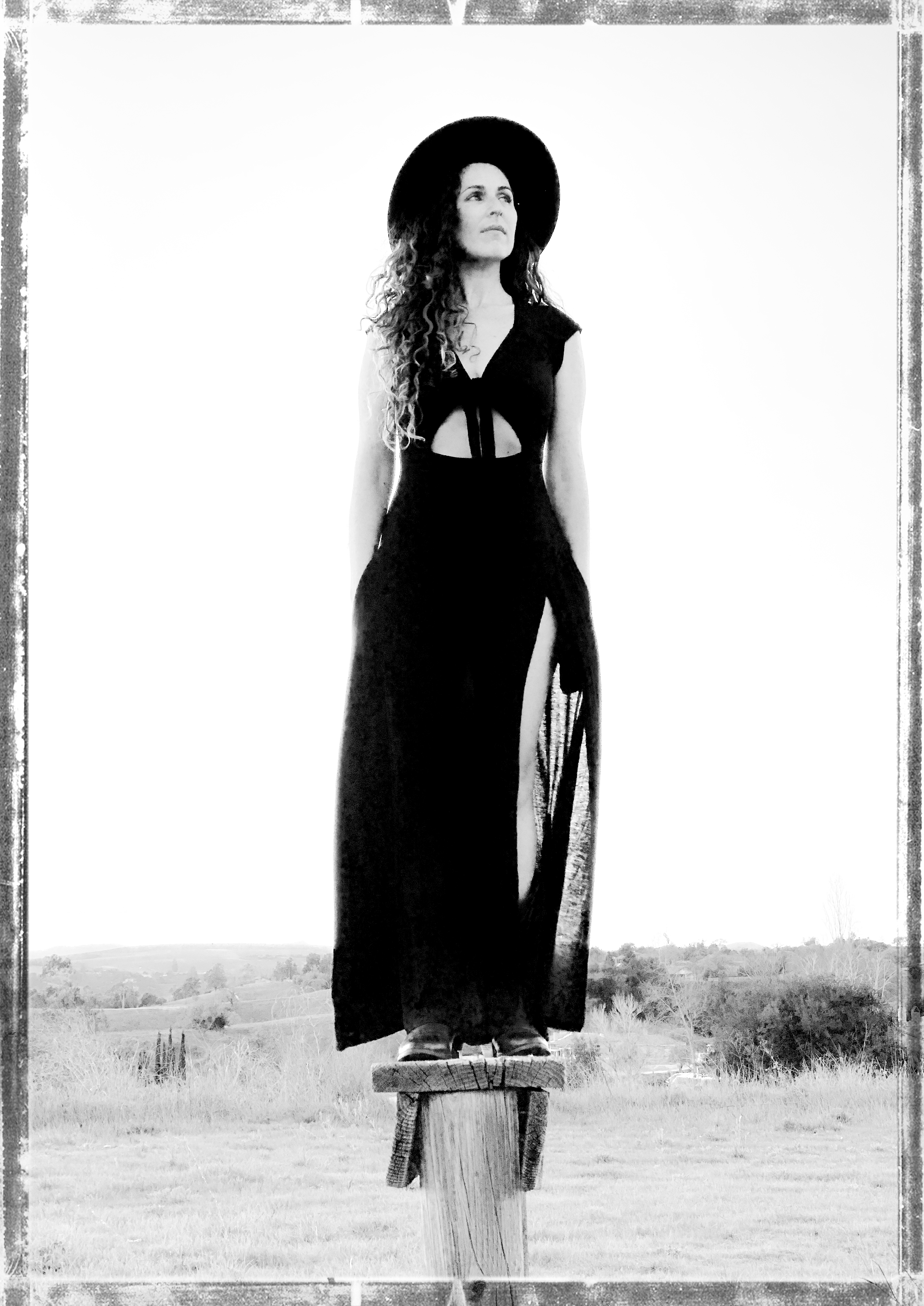
- Sara Hershkowitz in 2021
- Born: Los Angeles, California, U.S.
- Occupation: Operatic coloratura soprano
- Website: sarahershkowitz.com

Sara Hershkowitz (born 1980) is an American coloratura soprano, who made an international career based in Germany. She is known for roles in Mozart and Strauss operas, such as Konstanze, the Queen of the Night, Sophie and Zerbinetta, but also for contemporary music such as Ligeti's Le Grand Macabre.

== Career ==
Hershkowitz was born in Los Angeles to a family that had lived in Israel before moving to California in the 1960s. She graduated as a B.A. from the Manhattan School of Music. At age 23, she went to Germany, where she studied in Berlin. She was a member of the Theater Bremen from 2007 to 2012. Her first role there was the dual role of Venus and Chief of the Gepopo in Ligeti's Le Grand Macabre, staged by Tatjana Gürbaca. In Mozart operas, she has appeared in the title role of Zaide, as Arminda in La finta giardiniera, as Konstanze in Die Entführung aus dem Serail, as Donna Anna in Don Giovanni, as Madame Herz in Der Schauspieldirektor and as the Queen of the Night in Die Zauberflöte.

She performed the Queen of the Night at the Hamburg State Opera, the Nationaltheater Weimar and the Theater Kiel. In Strauss operas, she appeared as Sophie in Der Rosenkavalier in Bremen in 2010, staged by Tobias Kratzer, and she has performed the role of Zerbinetta in Ariadne auf Naxos with the Norwegian Arctic Philharmonic Orchestra and its opera company. She appeared in the title role of Zanaida, a rediscovered opera by Johann Christian Bach. The production with Opera Fuoco was first performed at the Goethe-Theater of Bad Lauchstädt as part of the Bachfest Leipzig in 2011, and again in a concert performance at the Konzerthaus Wien in 2012. She performed the role of Adele in the operetta Die Fledermaus by Johann Strauss at the Opéra national de Lorraine. In Offenbach's Hoffmanns Erzählungen, she has performed all beloved women of Hoffmann (Olympia, Antonia, Giulietta, Stella) at the Opernhaus Wuppertal.

In contemporary opera, she appeared as the Governess in Britten's The Turn of the Screw in Bremen. She performed Ligeti's Le Grand Macabre again for her debut at the Israeli Opera. In 2017, she performed Ligeti's excerpts from the work, Mysteries of the Macabre, with the Noord Nederlands Orkest at the Lowlands Festival in the Netherlands for a crowd of 15,000. Requested to make it provocative, she parodied Donald Trump in three costumes – as a clown, in a baby outfit with a bottle, and in a Miss America swimsuit. She commented in an interview: "Sometimes, particularly with a piece as radical as Le Grand Macabre, there is the space to stand up for what we believe in and to connect it to our times. ... And there is a long, glorious tradition of Jews using satire and theater to do so." She performed Mysteries of the Macabre again in Groningen later that same year.

In 2014, she participated in the first recording of Donizetti's scenic cantata Aristeia conducted by Franz Hauk. The same year, she recorded Simon Mayr's Il sogno di Partenope (Melodrama alegorico).

Hershkowitz made her debut with the Los Angeles Philharmonic in John Cage's Europeras in the 2018/19 season in a production by Yuval Sharon which was praised by The New Yorker as one of the top opera picks of 2018. Hershkowitz created the role of Claire Clairmont in Michael Wertmüller's avant-garde, serialist-fusion opera Diodati. Unendlich which premiered in 2019 at Theater Basel in a critically acclaimed production by stage director Lydia Steier in 2019.

In concert, she appeared with the NDR Chor and the NDR Sinfonieorchester, conducted by Thomas Hengelbrock, in a Passion concert which featured Fauré's Requiem, in both Hamburg and Lübeck in 2014. In July 2018, she sang with the Nordwestdeutsche Philharmonie, conducted by Vincent de Kort, Lieder by Richard Strauss including "Morgen!", "Zueignung", and several from Sechs Lieder, Op. 68, in Herford and at the opening of the festival Voices at Gut Holzhausen in July 2018.
