= Pumping Stations at the Nymphenburg Palace =

The Pumping Stations at the Nymphenburg Palace provide water at sufficient pressure to operate the fountains in the park and in front of the Nymphenburg Palace in Munich, Germany. The original water-powered pumping stations have been in continuous operation for more than 200 years. They ranked as masterpieces at the time when they were built and are considered to be Europe's oldest machines in operation since they were built.

== Green Pump House ==
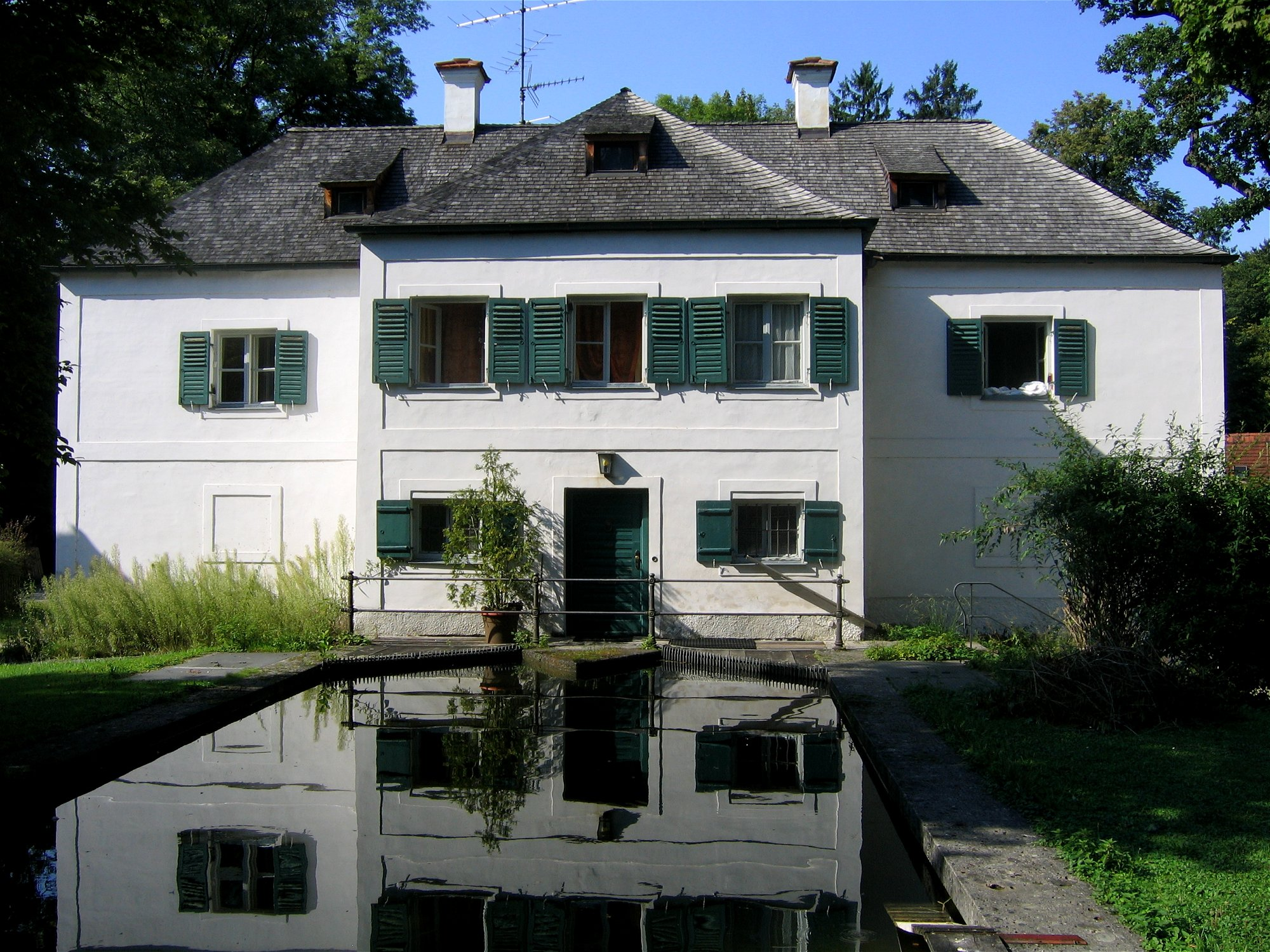
Green Pumphouse

The Green Pumphouse forms part of the "Dörfchen" (petit hameau) and is situated in the park on the southern canal where a marked drop in altitude to the central area of the park allowed the installation of water wheels (48°9′19.16″N 11°29′54.19″E). It was built in 1720 by Joseph Effner for Maximilian II Emanuel, Elector of Bavaria and contained pumps to supply water to the nearby Badenburg. In 1762, it was renewed and further little houses were added containing a forge and dwellings for the pump attendant and other servants. In 1767, Francois Poitevin installed a wooden baroque pumping station pumping water to water towers from where the fountain in the Large Parterre was operated by gravity.

In 1803, Joseph von Baader replaced these works by more powerful and quieter pumping installations which are still operating. From the canal, small headraces feed two undershot water wheels in the central section of the Green Pump House. The smaller water wheel has a diameter of 4.70 m, a width of 1.27 m and 36 blades. The wheel is connected to a crankshaft operating the pumping works in the adjoining room. Connecting rods raise and lower three large beams (balanciers). Their other end is connected via pumping rods to six pistons moving up and down in vertical cylinders. The frame of the machine is of oak wood, the beams and rods are made of cast iron, the crank is of wrought iron. The pistons and cylinders are made of brass. The pistons are wrapped in leather envelopes for smooth running and tightening and the leather is kept wet and supple by water from separate little pipes. The pistons' stroke length is 65 cm.

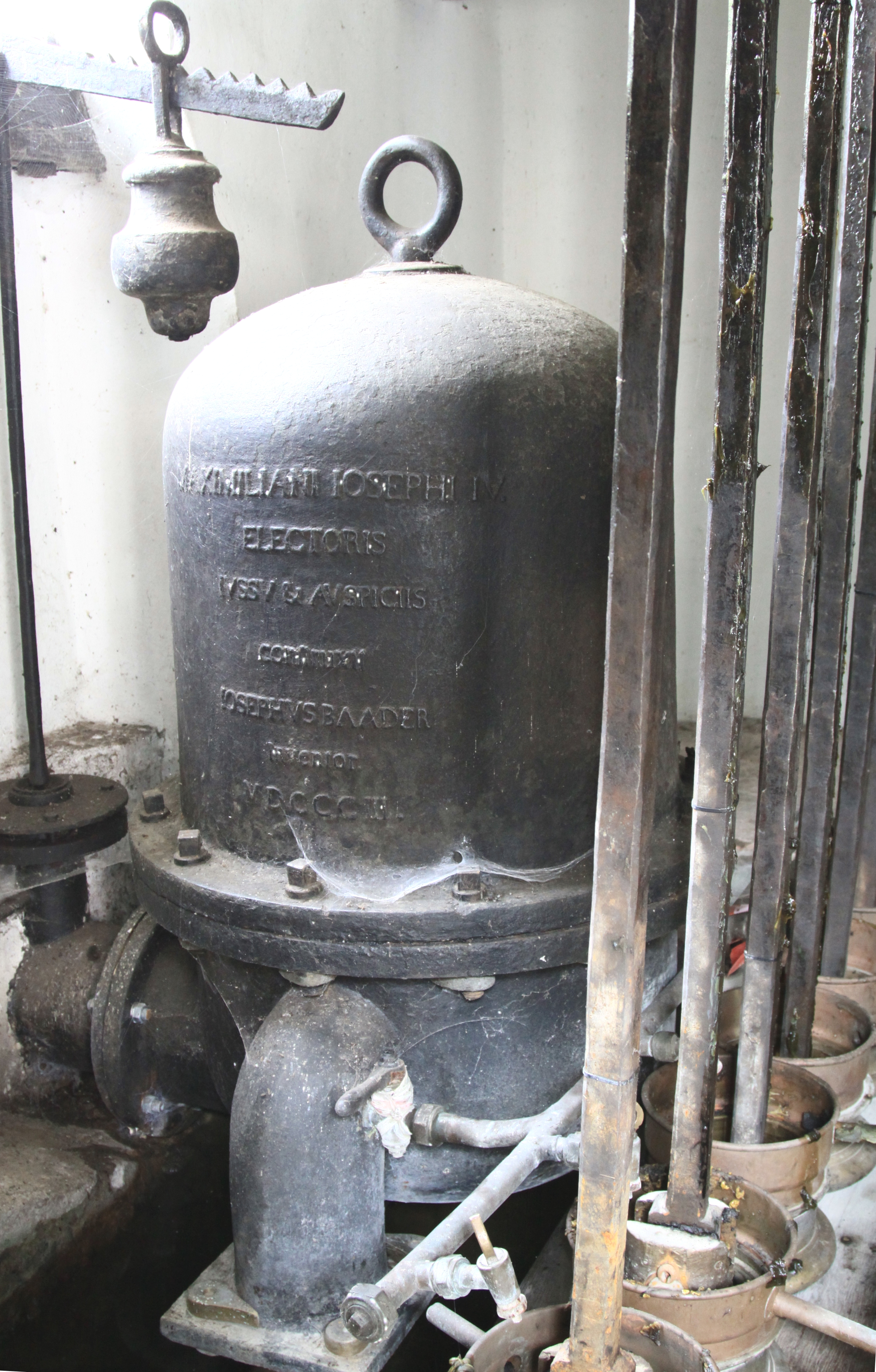
Pressure vessel in the Green Pump House with pumping rods and cylinders on the right

Baader installed closed cast iron pressure vessels filled with air between the pumps and the outlet pipes to cushion the varying hydraulic pressures generated by the pumps, and thus maintain a high and almost even water pressure in the cast iron duct leading to the fountain.

The pressure vessel bears the following inscription:

MAXIMILIANI IOSEPHI IV. ELECTORIS
IUSSU &

AUSPICIIS
construxit
IOSEPHUS BAADER
Inventor

MDCCCIII

(By order and under the reign of Maximilian IV Joseph Elector of Bavaria the inventor Joseph Baader constructed (this) in 1803)

Behind the pressure vessel, there is a pressure control valve which is controlled by an iron weight suspended from a gear rack thus making up an adjustable automatic valve.

The pumping installation in the eastern part of the pump house is driven by the large water wheel with a diameter of 5.30 m, a width of 1.50 m and 48 blades. Its crankshaft activates two beams and four pumps in the adjoining room. The cylinders have a diameter of 38 cm, the pistons' stroke length is 68 cm. There are two pressure vessels which also serve as support for the beams. Again, little pipes provide water for the leather envelopes of the pistons. The outlet duct with pressurized water is joined with the other duct behind the house. The installation is equipped with a manometer signed by Franz Höss, Hofbrunnen-Meister in München, 1851 (Franz Höss, royal master of pumps in Munich, 1851), one of the oldest instruments on earth still being used.

All pumps work are staggered in time so as to achieve a level of pressurization as even as possible. The aggregate flow rate of both installations reaches 55 liters per second.

To a very large extent, these pumping works are still in their original configuration except for the wooden water wheels which were replaced by metal wheels in 1900.

== Johannis Pump House ==
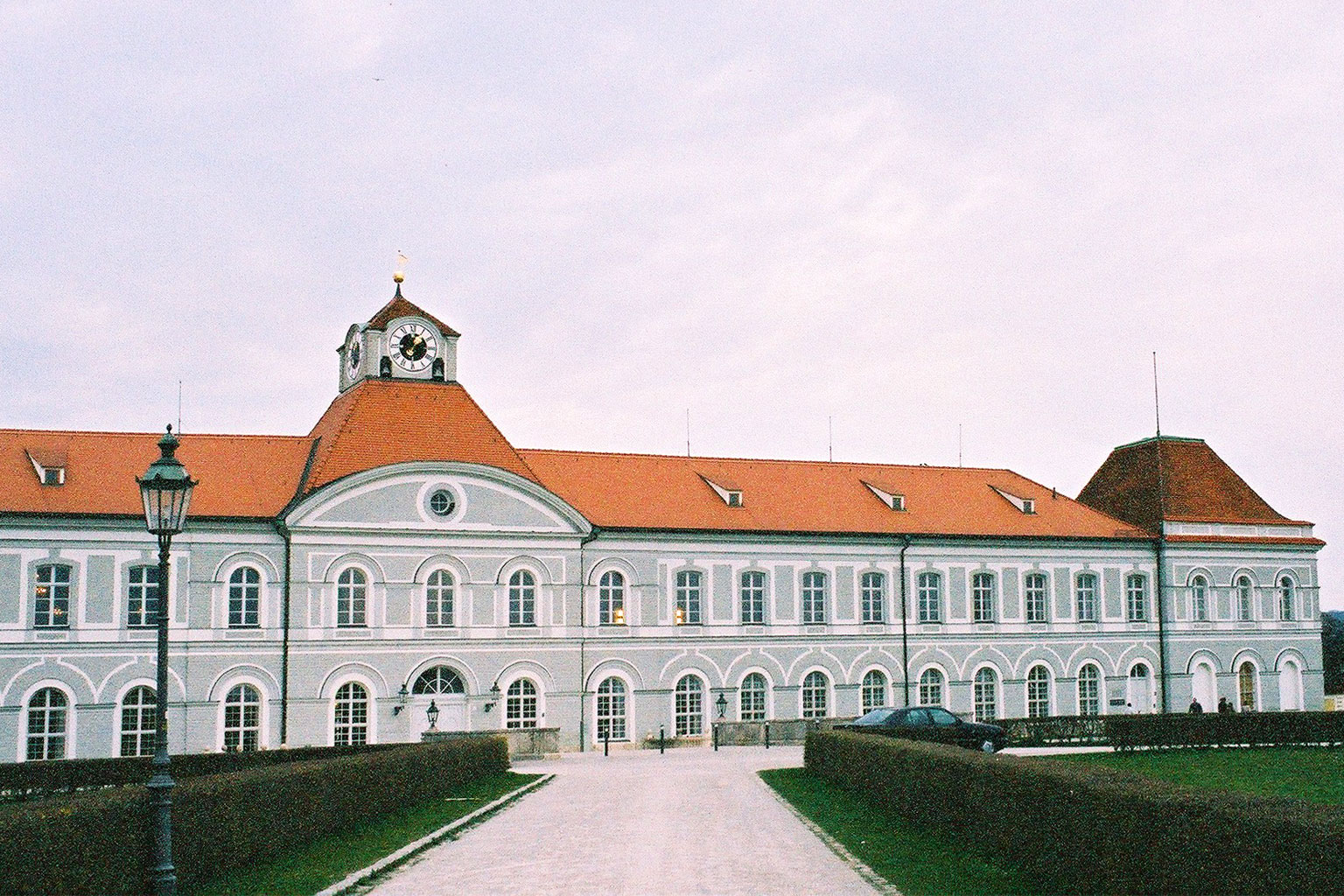
Northern wing, former Orangerie and Johannis Tower (on the right)

In 1807/08, Baader installed another machine in the Johannis tower of the Palace's northern wing feeding the fountain in front of the palace (48°9′35.85″N 11°30′19.01″E). It is a comparatively powerful, but compact installation consisting of a series of three overshot water wheels in one large frame operating six beams and twelve pumps mounted on this frame. The pressure vessels are rectangular metal boxes put in between the beams and rods.

Originally, the frame, the water wheels and the beams were made of wood, but in 1835, Franz Höss, the royal master of pumps, replaced them by metal ones. The installation now is cast iron, the headraces and water boxes are made of copper, the pumping rods are wrought iron and the cylinders are brass with a diameter of 29 cm and a stroke length of 55 cm. As in the other pumping installations, the pistons have leather envelopes which are kept wet by small water pipes. The staggered action of the beams and pumps is clearly visible and a glance on the fountain proves the water pressure to be almost constant.

The water wheels have a diameter of 3.00 m, a width of 2.70 m and 30 blades each. They are fed by an underground headrace branched off from the canal in front of the northern wing. The underground tail race crosses the street and parking in front of the building and appears on the surface in a canal dug deep into the lawn in the northern part of the Schlossrondell, the semicircular approach area. The water wheels average ten revolutions per minute and then produce a flow rate of 60 liters per second. This pumping station continues to operate the fountain in front of the palace.

== Hirschgarten Pump House ==
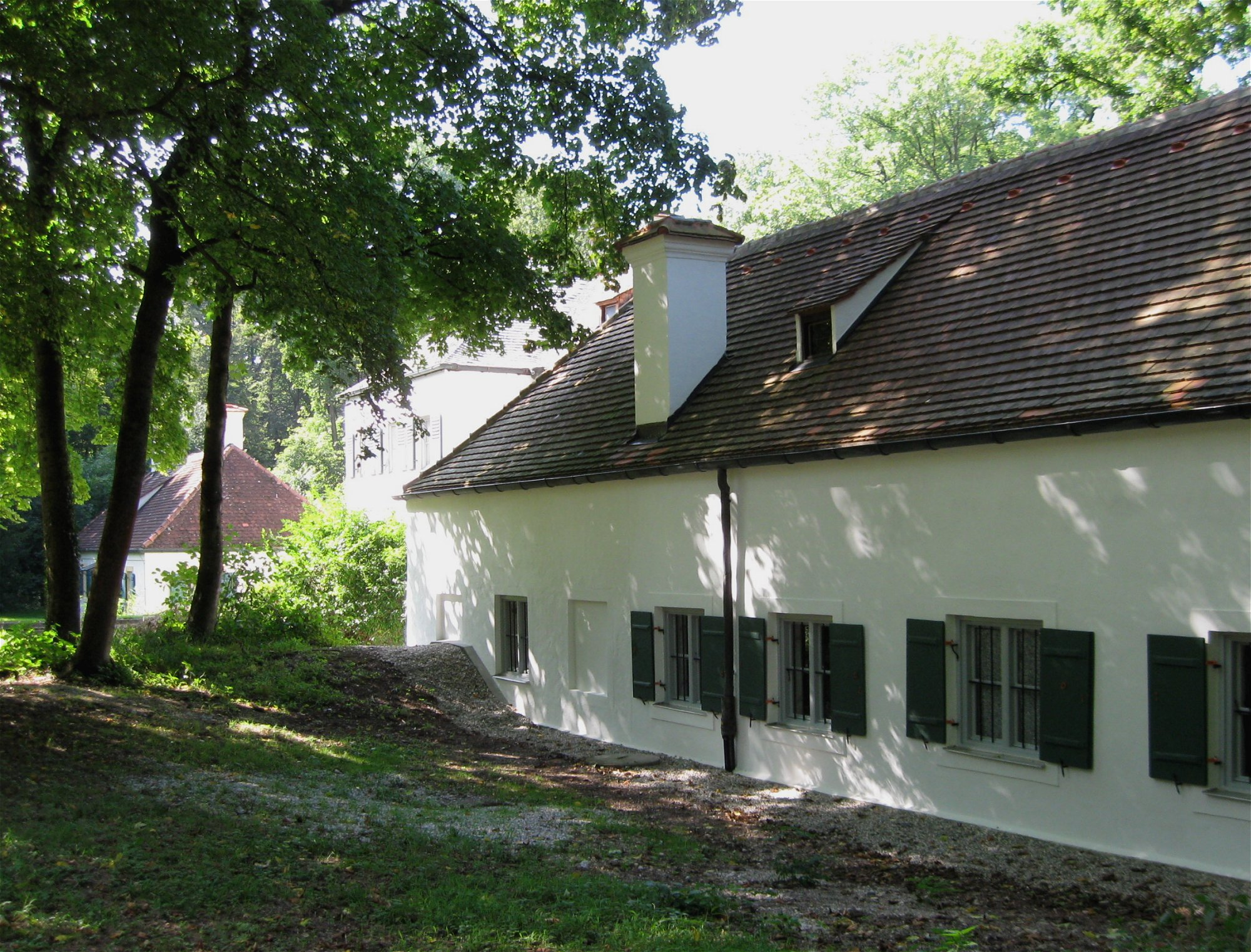
Hirschgarten Pump House, the covered head race is next to the left corner of the house

During 1817/18, Joseph von Baader installed a smaller pumping installation in the Hirschgarten Pump House next to the Green Pump House (48°9′18.99″N 11°29′55.06″E). The pumps supplied water to the palace kitchen, the royal confectionery, the stables and to the royal deer park. An underground headrace from the canal drove an overshot water wheel with a diameter and a width of 2 meters which in its turn operated a beam and two pumps in brass cylinders with a diameter of 18 cm and a stroke of 55 cm. This installation reached a flow rate of 4 liters per second.

In the 20th century, this pump house supplied water to parts of the palace and to the garden plots in the vicinity until it was shut down in 1963 and the headrace was closed by a metal plate. The pumping installation may still be viewed.

== Operation, administration ==
The pumping stations (as well as the palace and its garden) are administered and operated by the Bavarian Department of State-owned Palaces, Gardens and Lakes. They may be viewed through the open windows and doors daily from 9 h to 16 h during the period from April to mid October, but there is no public access to the interior of the houses.

== Images ==
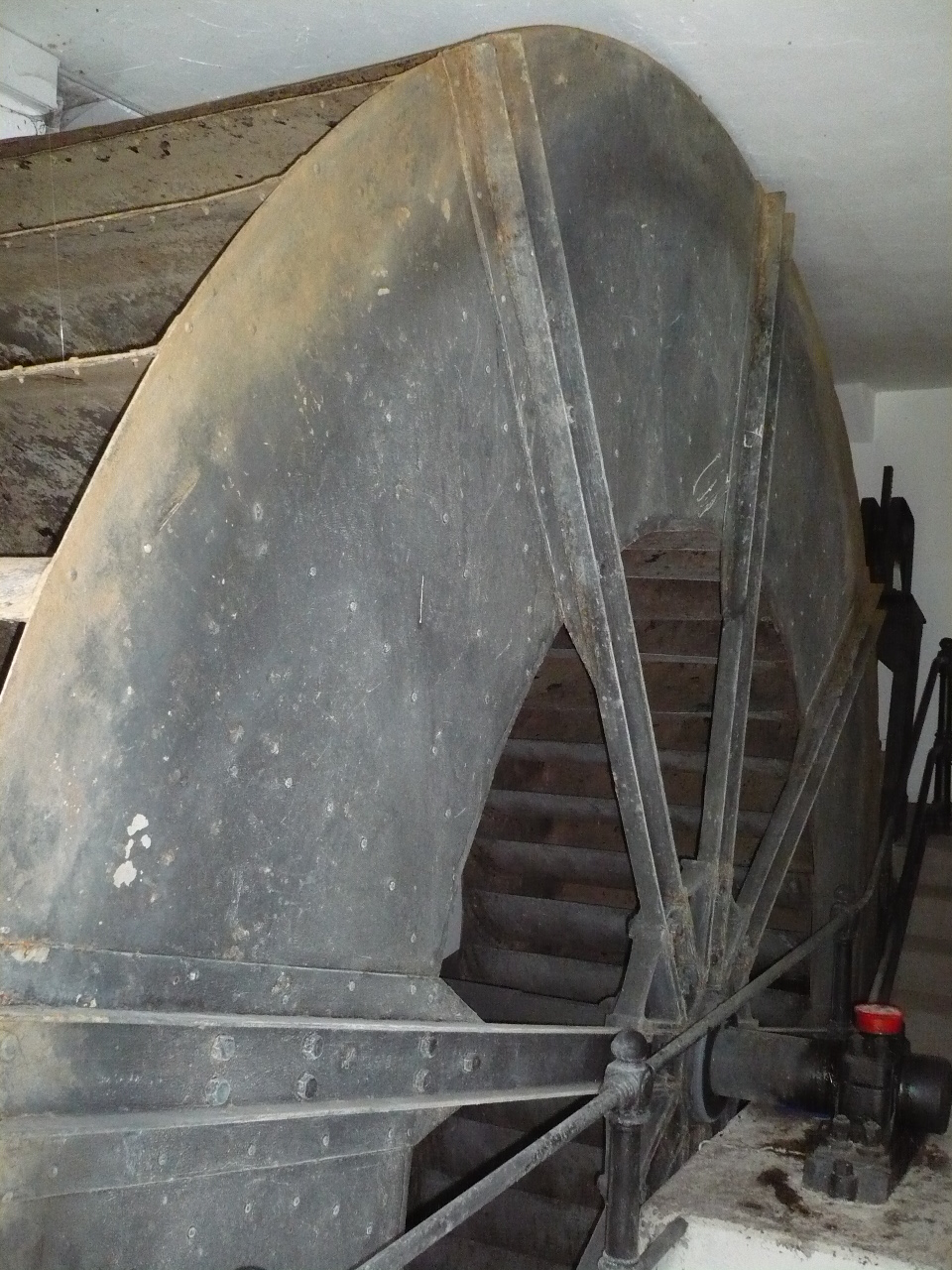
Large water wheel in the Green Pump House

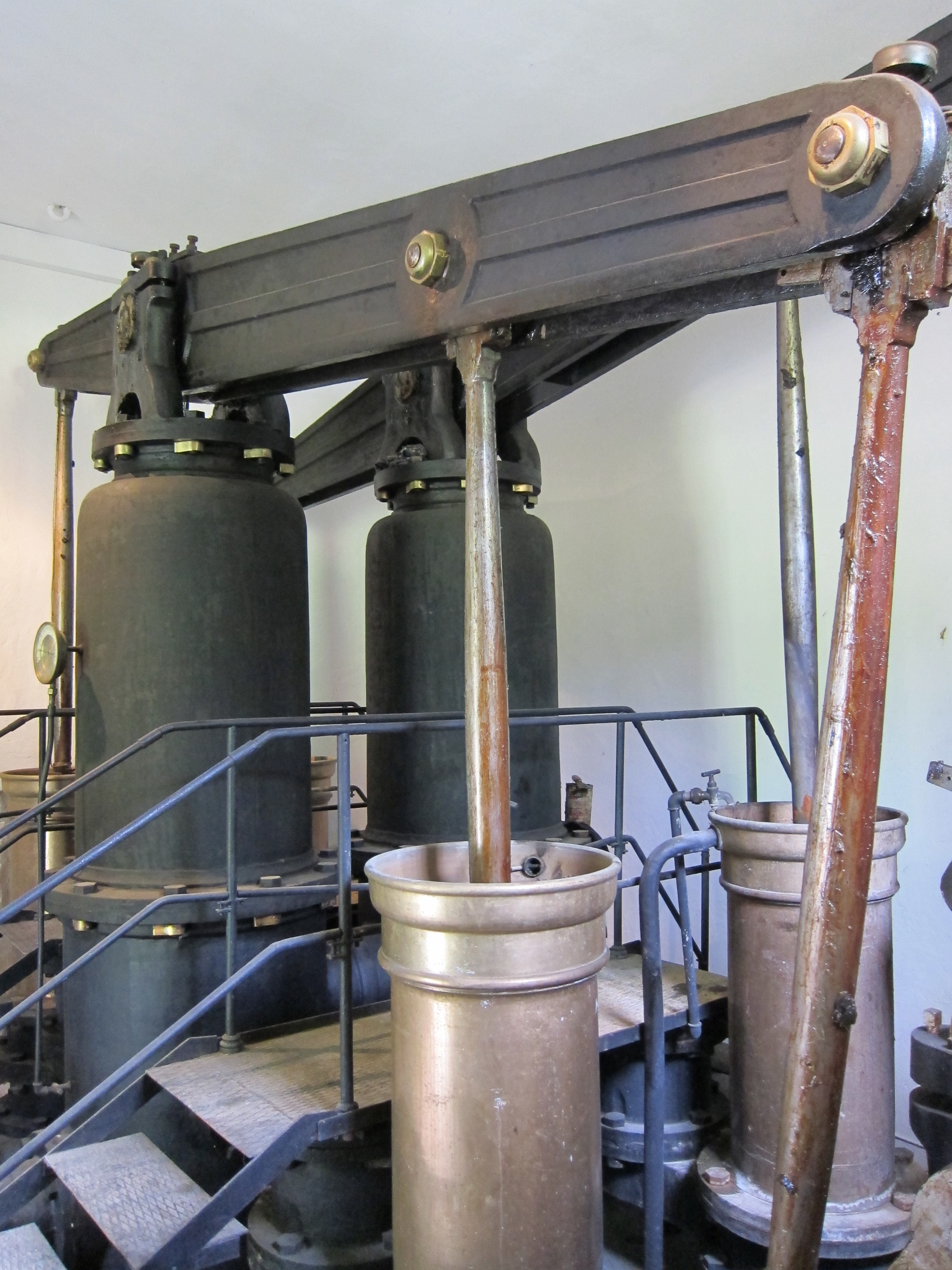
Pump in the eastern room of the Green Pump House

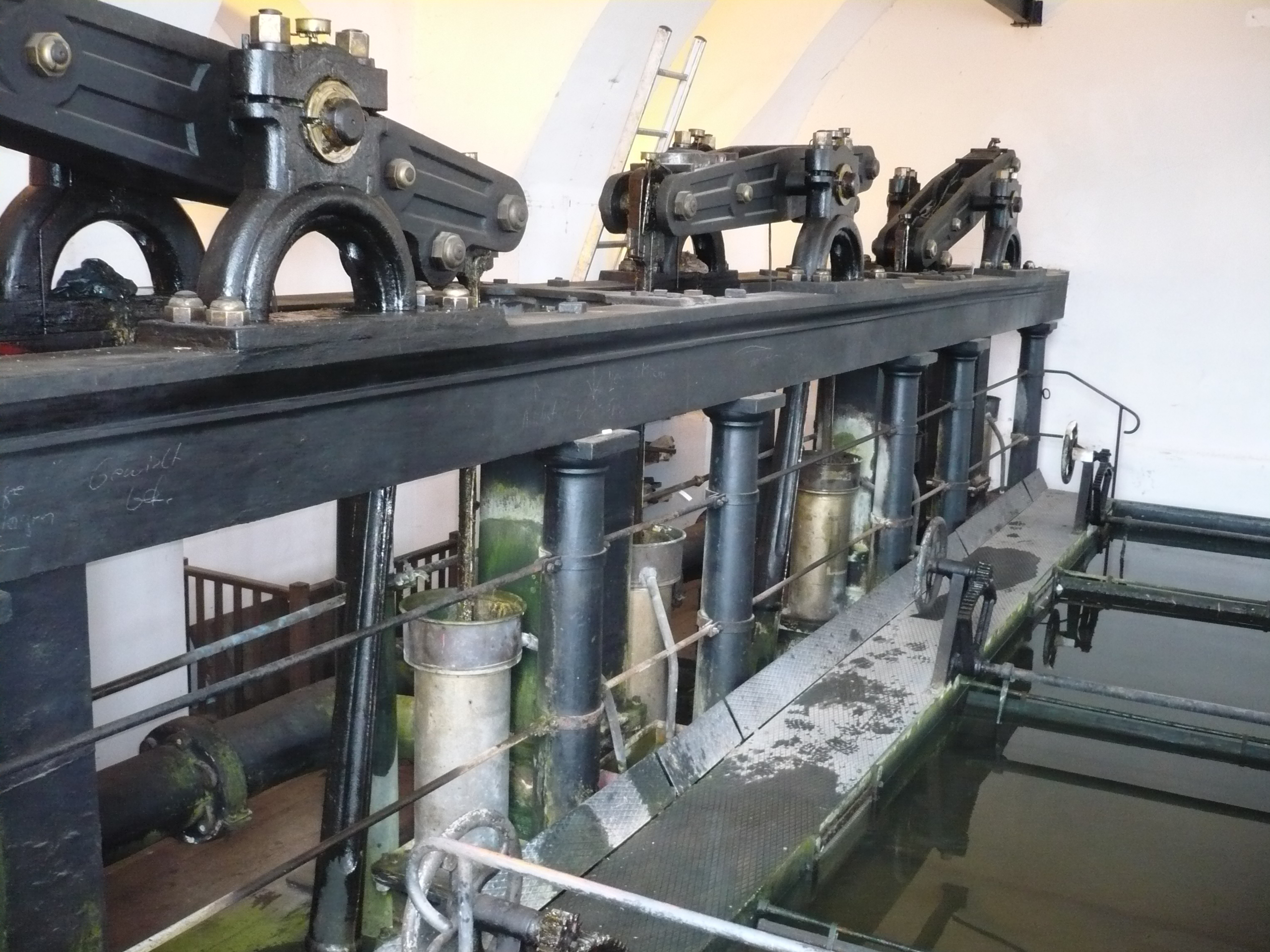
Pumps in the Johannis Pump House

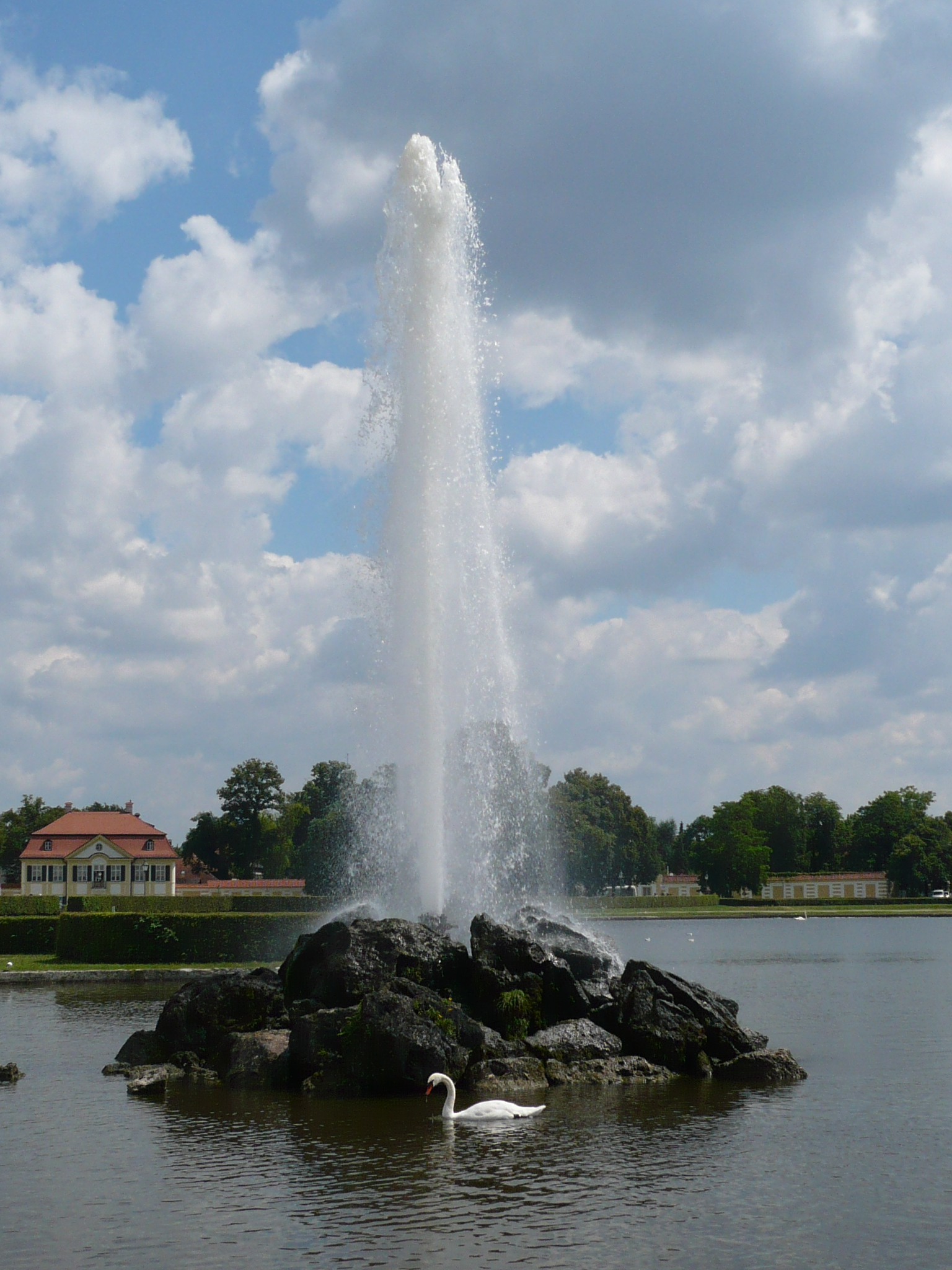
Fountain in front of the palace
