= Ernst von Lasaulx =

German classical philologist, philosopher of history, and politician (1805–1861)

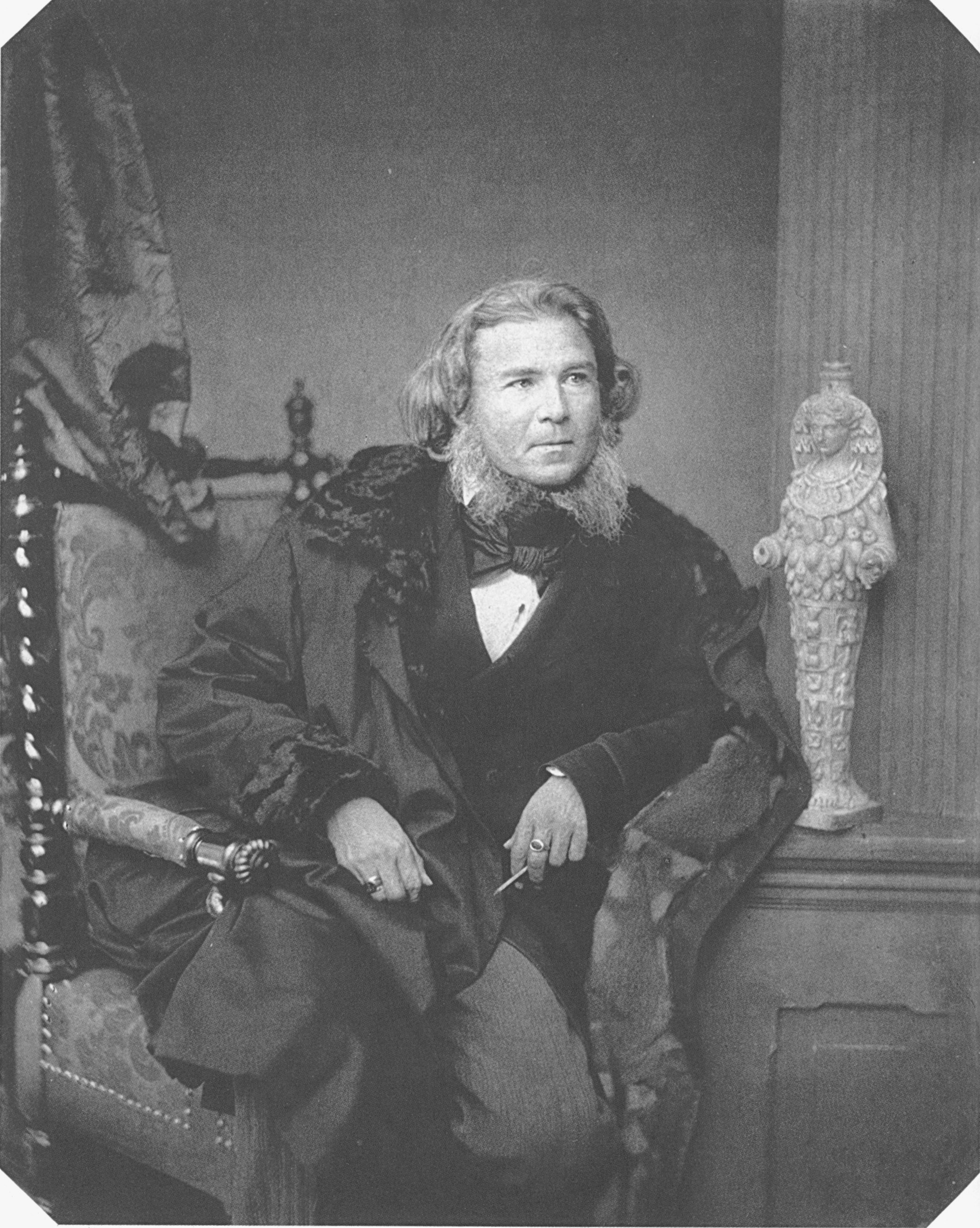
- Lasaulx c. 1860
- Born: 16 March 1805; Koblenz, Rhin-et-Moselle, French Empire
- Died: 9 May 1861 (aged 56); Munich, Kingdom of Bavaria
- Education: University of Bonn, Ludwig-Maximilians-Universität München
- Occupations: Philologist; philosopher; politician
- Known for: Member of the Frankfurt Parliament; philosophy of history; aesthetic theory
- Spouse: Julie Josephine Therese von Baader (m. 1835)
- Children: Anna Marie de Lasaulx

Peter Ernst von Lasaulx, known as Ernst von Lasaulx (German pronunciation: [laˈsoː]; 16 March 1805 – 9 May 1861) was a German philologist and politician.

== Early life and education ==
Lasaulx was born in Koblenz, and died in Munich. He was the eldest son of well-known architect, Johann Claudius von Lasaulx (1781–1848) and his wife, Anna Maria Müller (1781–1855). He was named for his grandfather, Peter Ernst Joseph von Lasaulx (1757–1809), who served as Syndic for Koblenz. Ernst's siblings included:

- Otto Phillip von Lasaulx (1806–1897) - immigrated to Fayette County, Texas in 1848 after serving as building inspector in Elberfeld.
- Hermann von Lasaulx (1808–1868)
- Maria Anna von Lasaulx (1810–1866) - served as Superior of the Heiligen Geist Hospital in Luxembourg.
- Peter Francis von Lasaulx (1811)
- Clementine Maria von Lasaulx (1812–1877)
- Karl Adam von Lasaulx (1814–1815)
- Amalie von Lasaulx (1815–1872) - known as Sister Augustine, served as Superior of the St. Johannis Hospital in Bonn until she was removed due to conflict with doctrinal forces of the time.
- Katherina von Lasaulx (1817–1819)

Ernst's uncle was Johann Joseph von Görres, a well-known priest and writer, husband to aunt Catherine von Lasaulx.

At a young age, Ernst Lasaulx became fascinated with classical philosophy. He studied at the University of Bonn (1824–1830) and then at the Ludwig-Maximilians-Universität München, where he focused on Schelling, Görres, and Baader, whose daughter he later married. After finishing his studies at the university, he spent the next four years traveling around Austria, Italy, Greece, and Palestine; visiting all the most important places from history. His trip to Athens was made as part of the party of Prince Otto of Wittelsbach, who had just been made King of the Hellenes

Returning to Germany, he received his doctorate from Kiel University in 1835 with the dissertation De mortis dominatu in veteres, commentatio theologica-philosophica, and was subsequently appointed to be docent of classical philology at the University of Würzburg. On 31 August 1835 he married Julie Josephine Therese von Baader (May 1807–4 July 1880), a daughter of philosopher Franz Xaver von Baader (1765–1841). It is believed that Ernst and Julie had seven children, one of whom was Anna Marie de Lasaulx (Lassaulx) (3 December 1837–14 July 1887).

== Career ==
=== Cologne in 1837 ===
On 20 November 1837 Clemens August, Archbishop of Cologne, was arrested and imprisoned by the Prussian government. This sent a shock through Catholic circles throughout Germany, and inspired both Lasaulx and his uncle to write pamphlets. His, Kritische Bemerkungen über die Kölner Sache (Critical Remarks about the Cologne Matter), was a controversial attack on the Prussians in general and diplomat Josias von Bunsen in particular.

Although the Würzburg government tried to keep him there, Lasaulx left in 1844 to become Professor of Philology and Aesthetics at the Ludwig-Maximilians-Universität München, where he became known for his magnetic style. He became involved in political matters, which resulted in the dismissal of Minister Abel in 1847, this made heads of the university happy, but Ludwig I quite upset. He dismissed Lasaulx from his post, and upon protests by the students, and eight other professors as well. Lasaulx and three other former Munich lecturers were elected to the national assembly in Frankfort, where he identified himself with the conservatives.

=== Montez Scandal ===
In 1848 Ludwig I was forced to abdicate over a scandal involving his mistress Lola Montez. His successor, Maximilian II gave in to public pressure and reinstated Lasaulx and the others to their old posts in 1849. Later that year, Lasaulx was elected to the Bavarian Chamber of Deputies. He served there until his death on 9 May 1861.

== Works ==
In 1860, he dedicated his “Philosophy of Fine Arts" to Emilie Linder, a painter and intellectual in Munich.
