= Kreiten =

Kreiten is a surname. Notable people with the surname include:

- Karlrobert Kreiten (1916–1943), German pianist
- William Kreiten (1847–1902), German literary critic and poet
