= Giovanni Gualberto Bottarelli =

Italian librettist

Giovanni Gualberto Bottarelli (fl. 1741 – c. 1783) was an Italian librettist.

== Life and career ==
The year of Giovanni Gualberto Bottarelli's birth in Siena, Italy is not known. Carl Heinrich Graun, a German composer and Kapellmeister to Frederick the Great, recruited Bottarelli to the Berlin court during his trip to Italy in 1740-1741. In Berlin Botarelli served as the king's librettist; transcribing the king's own ideas and sketches for operas based on French literature into usable Italian-language libretti with Graun providing the music. One of these operas was Rodelinda regina de’ Lombardi (based on Pierre Corneille's Pertharite, roi des Lombards and prior opera libretti by Antonio Salvi and Nicola Francesco) which premiered for the grand opening of a new theatre inside the Sans-Souci Palace on 13 December 1741. A later opera collaboration of this trio, Cesare e Cleopatra (based on Corneille’s La Mort de Pompée), premiered for the grand opening of the Berlin Royal Opera House on 7 December 1742.

Bottarelli was a witness in a court case against Casanova, who reported of him "Botarelli publishes in a pamphlet all the ceremonies of the Freemasons, and the only sentence passed on him is: 'He is a scoundrel. We knew that before!'" Casanova also calls Bottarelli a rascal, after meeting him and his family in penury, and reports that Bottarelli had been a monk in his native city, Pisa, and had fled to England with his wife, who had been a nun. The accusations against Bottarelli were not true, and the publication on free masonry was by a different author. However, these accusations caused difficulty for his public reputation in Berlin, and in 1747 he was dismissed at the Berlin court. He was replaced by Leopoldo de Villati.

After this Bottarelli managed Giovanni Giordani's opera troupe before moving to England in 1754; ultimately becoming the house poet at the King's Theatre, London in the late 1750s. He remained in that position until 1783 after which his activities and information about his place and date of death are unknown. In the London theatre he was most often employed modifying the texts to pre-existing burlettas; re-working the libretti to already successful works rather than writing completely original material of his own. However, he did continue to write new libretti in London during his roughly 25 year period at the King's Theatre; doing so for new operas by composers Felice Alessandri, Johann Christian Bach, Gioacchino Cocchi, Pietro Alessandro Guglielmi, Antonio Sacchini, and Mattia Vento. He also made a living in London selling maps and books.

== Other opera libretti ==
Bottarelli wrote the libretto for several operas to which Johann Christian Bach wrote the music, and adapted many other operas. The first collaboration with Bach was Orione, performed at the King's Theatre (now Her Majesty's Theatre) in Haymarket to great acclaim in February 1763. Zanaida, a three-act opera debuted in London in May 1763, but was less well received. Other works were "Addio di Londra", "Carattaco", "Cesare e Cleopatra", "Il Cid ", "L'Endimione", and "Rodelinda regina de' Longobardi".

Il ré pastore (The royal shepherd), adapted by Bottarelli, was printed in London in 1765.
