= Geschichte vom braven Kasperl und dem schönen Annerl =

1817 novella by Clemens Brentano

Geschichte vom braven Kasperl und dem schönen Annerl (or The Story of Just Casper and Fair Annie in English) is a novella by Clemens Brentano, first published in 1817 in the book Gaben der Milde, edited by Friedrich Wilhelm Gubitz.

The Britannica found it ”displays themes from German folklore within a fantasy atmosphere”. The novella is characterized by its fatalism, according to Peter Howarth.

== See also ==
- Geschichte vom braven Kasperl und dem schönen Annerl in German Language
