= Emilie Linder =

Swiss painter and art patron

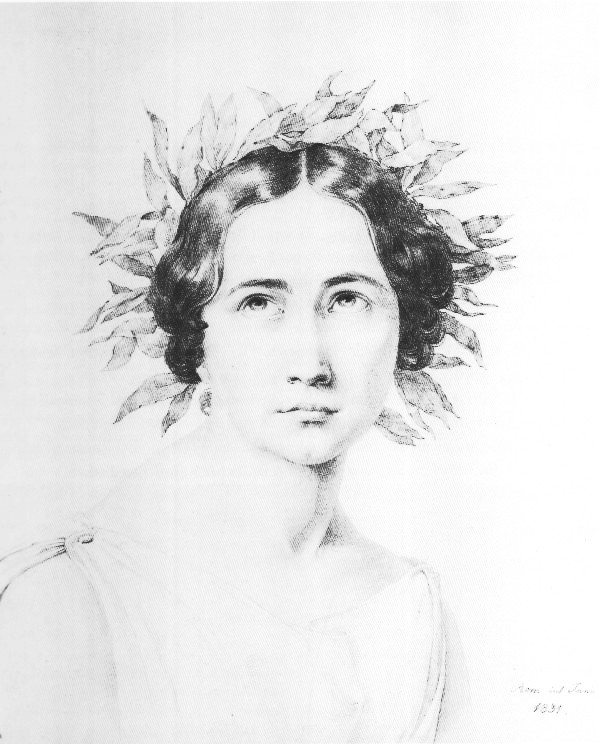
- Born: October 11, 1797; Basel, Switzerland
- Died: February 12, 1867; Munich, Germany
- Other names: Sophie Emilie Linder; Émilie Linder

Emilie Linder (Oct. 11, 1797 – Feb. 12, 1867) was a Swiss painter and art patron.

== Early life ==
Linder was born in Basel, Switzerland in 1797. She was the daughter of painter Franz Lukas Linder and Anna Maria Dienast; the Linders were an established family of textile manufacturers in Basel. Orphaned by age fifteen, her grandfather Johann Konrad Dienast-Burckhardt took her in and encouraged her talent for art.

== Education and career ==
In 1824, Linder moved to Munich for artistic education. While she visited the Academy of Fine Arts in Munich, because she was a woman, she could not attend the academy herself. Her primary teacher was history painter Joseph Schlotthauer.

Her family friend Johann Nepomuk von Ringseis introduced Linder to many of the artists active in Munich. She was wooed by Franz Xaver von Baader and Clemens Brentano, but did not marry either of them.

She traveled to northern and central Italy in 1825 with Schlotthauer and his wife. Between 1828 and 1831, Linder lived in Rome and studied Italian paintings. While in Italy, Linder befriended Johann Friedrich Overbeck, leader of the Nazarene movement of German Romantic Christian painters.

In 1832, Linder settled permanently in Munich. She became well-known as a painter and as an intellectual hostess of salons.

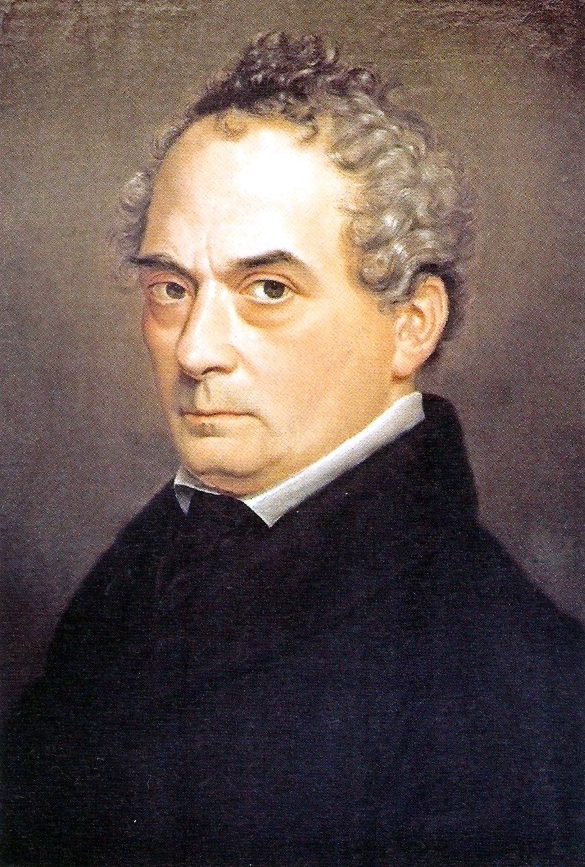
Linder, portrait of Clemens Brentano, 1835.

=== Paintings ===
Linder mostly painted anonymous devotional pictures and altarpieces, which she gave to destitute churches. Though she was known for her paintings during her lifetime, her habit of not signing her paintings has concealed her impact in German religious painting. She also painted portraits of friends and nobility.

Her 1835 portrait of Brentano is widely used, though it is often uncredited. Today, it is in the Munich Stadtmuseum.

=== Conversion ===
Linder converted to Catholicism in 1843. Her artwork became entirely religious.

=== Art Collection ===
Linder used her wealth to collect and commission paintings by the Nazarenes and other, lesser-known painters. She commissioned Schlotthauer to travel to Italy to copy Leonardo da Vinci's Last Supper in 1834.

== Cultural impact ==
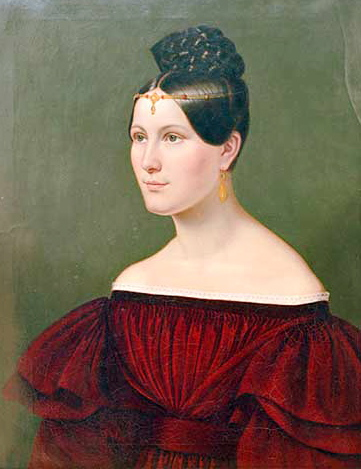
Linder, Portrait of the Baroness von Eichthal, 19th century.

Linder was one of Brentano's main correspondents during his religious seclusion.

Franz von Baader dedicated his "Forty Sentences from a Religious Erotic" to her in 1831. In 1860, Ernst von Lasaulx dedicated his “Philosophy of Fine Arts" to her.

== Legacy ==
In 1847, Linder donated her entire art collection, including many important Nazarene paintings, to the public art gallery in Basel. Today, her works are in the Kunstmuseum Basel.

She also donated a sizable fortune to the Catholic diocese in Basel, which enabled them to build the Church of St. Marien (Basel), which was the first Catholic church built in Basel after the Reformation.
