= Clemens Brentano =

German poet and novelist (1778–1842)

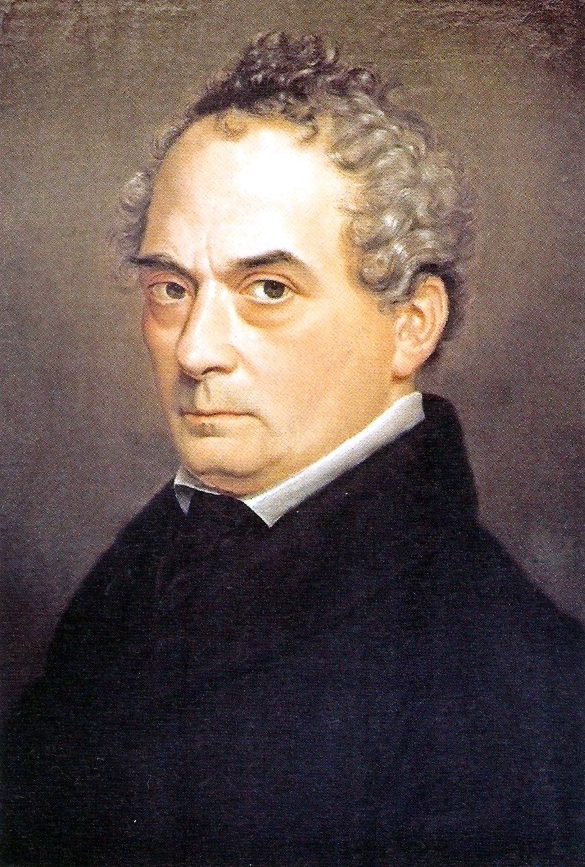
- Portrait by Emilie Linder, painted in 1835; printed in from Meyer's Encyclopedia, 1906
- Born: 9 September 1778; Ehrenbreitstein near Koblenz (today in Koblenz), Electorate of Trier, Holy Roman Empire
- Died: 28 July 1842 (aged 63); Aschaffenburg, Germany
- Education: University of Halle
- Occupation: Writer
- Relatives: Bettina von Arnim (sister); Christian Brentano (brother); Sophie von La Roche (grandmother); Franz Brentano (nephew); Lujo Brentano (nephew); Gisela von Arnim (niece)
- Writing career
- Period: Romantic
- Genre: Poetry
- Notable work: Des Knaben Wunderhorn

Clemens Wenzeslaus Brentano (also Klemens; pseudonym: Clemens Maria Brentano /brɛnˈtɑːnoʊ/; German: [bʁɛnˈtaːno]; 9 September 1778 – 28 July 1842) was a German poet and novelist, and a major figure of German Romanticism. He was the uncle, via his brother Christian, of Franz and Lujo Brentano.

== Biography ==
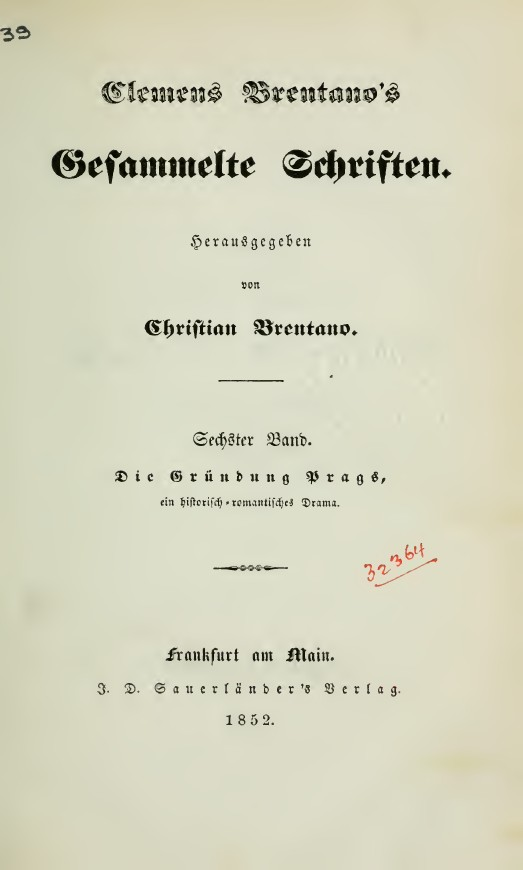
Die Gründung Prags (1852)

Clemens Brentano was born to Peter Anton Brentano and Maximiliane von La Roche, a wealthy merchant family in Frankfurt on 9 September 1778. His father's family was of Italian descent. His maternal grandmother was Sophie von La Roche. His sister was writer Bettina von Arnim, who, at a young age, lionised and corresponded with Goethe, and, in 1835, published the correspondence as Goethes Briefwechsel mit einem Kinde (Goethe's correspondence with a child). Clemens Brentano studied in Halle and Jena, afterwards residing at Heidelberg, Vienna and Berlin. He was close to Wieland, Herder, Goethe, Friedrich Schlegel, Fichte and Tieck.

From 1798 to 1800 Brentano lived in Jena, the first center of the romantic movement. In 1801, he moved to Göttingen, and became a friend of Achim von Arnim. He married writer Sophie Mereau on 29 October 1803. In 1804, he moved to Heidelberg and worked with Arnim on Zeitungen für Einsiedler and Des Knaben Wunderhorn. After his wife Sophie died in 1806 he married a second time in 1807 to Auguste Bussmann (whose half-sister, Marie de Flavigny, later by marriage the Countess Marie d'Agoult, would become the companion of pianist and composer Franz Liszt). In the years between 1808 and 1818, Brentano lived mostly in Berlin, and from 1819 to 1824 in Dülmen, Westphalia.

In 1818, weary of his somewhat restless and unsettled life, he returned to the practice of the Catholic faith and withdrew to the monastery of Dülmen, where he lived for some years in strict seclusion. He took on there the position of secretary to the Catholic visionary nun, the Blessed Anne Catherine Emmerich.

It was claimed that from 1802 until her death she bore the wounds of the Crown of Thorns, and from 1812 the full stigmata, a cross over her heart and the wound from the lance. Clemens Brentano made her acquaintance in 1818 and remained at the foot of the stigmatist's bed copying her dictation until 1824. When she died, he prepared an index of the visions and revelations from her journal, The Dolorous Passion of Our Lord Jesus Christ (published 1833). One of these visions made known by Brentano later resulted in the identification of the putative House of the Virgin Mary in Ephesus by Abbé Julien Gouyet, a French priest, during 1881. However, some posthumous investigations in 1923 and 1928 made it uncertain how much of the books he attributed to Emmerich were actually his own creation and the works were discarded for her beatification process.

The latter part of his life he spent in Regensburg, Frankfurt and Munich, actively engaged in promoting the Catholic faith. Brentano assisted Ludwig Achim von Arnim, his brother-in-law, in the collection of folk-songs forming Des Knaben Wunderhorn (1805–1808), which Gustav Mahler drew upon for his song cycle. In 1835, Swiss painter Emilie Linder, painted the famous portrait of him. He died in Aschaffenburg.

Brentano, whose early writings were published under the pseudonym Maria, belonged to the Heidelberg group of German romantic writers, and his works are marked by excess of fantastic imagery and by abrupt, bizarre modes of expression. His first published writings were Satiren und poetische Spiele (Leipzig, 1800), a romance Godwi oder Das steinerne Bild der Mutter (2 vols., Frankfort, 1801), and a musical drama Die lustigen Musikanten (Frankfort, 1803). Of his dramas the best are Ponce de Leon (1804), Victoria und ihre Geschwister (Berlin, 1817) and Die Grundung Prags (Pesth, 1815).

On the whole his finest work is the collection of Romanzen vom Rosenkranz (published posthumously in 1852); his short stories, and more especially the charming Geschichte vom braven Kasperl und dem schönen Annerl (1817), which has been translated into English, were very popular.

Brentano's collected works, edited by his brother Christian, appeared at Frankfurt in 9 vols. (1851–1855). Selections have been edited by J. B. Diel (1873), M. Koch (1892), and J. Dohmke (1893). See J. B. Diel and William Kreiten, Klemens Brentano (2 vols, 1877–1878), the introduction to Koch's edition, and R. Steig, A. von Arnim und K. Brentano (1894).

In his honor the Clemens Brentano prize is awarded for German literature.

== Musical settings and cultural references ==
Richard Strauss set six poems by Brentano in Sechs Lieder, Op. 68, in 1918, which are also known as his Brentano Lieder.

Brentano's work is referenced in Thomas Mann's novel Doctor Faustus. A cycle of thirteen songs, based on Brentano's poems, is noted in Chapter XXI as one of the composer protagonist's most significant early works.

Robert Walser wrote several pieces about Brentano, including "Brentano" (1913) and "Brentano (III)" (1926), two of which are collected in Speaking to the Rose

== Works ==
=== Poems ===
- Eingang
- Frühlingsschrei eines Knechtes
- Abendständchen
- Lore Lay
- Auf dem Rhein
- Wiegenlied
- An Sophie Mereau
- Ich wollt ein Sträusslein binden
- Der Spinnerin Lied
- Aus einem kranken Herzen
- Hast du nicht mein Glück gesehen?
- Frühes Lied
- Schwanenlied
- Nachklänge Beethovenscher Musik
- Romanzen vom Rosenkranz
- Einsam will ich untergehn
- Hörst du wie die Brunnen rauschen
- Rückblick

=== Religious works ===
- Die Barmherzigen Schwestern in Bezug auf Armen- und Krankenpflege (Care of the Poor and Sick by the Sisters of Mercy ) (1831) (New Edition edited by Renate Moering)
- Lehrjahre Jesu (The Formative Years of Jesus) (1822) Part I and II (Edited by Jürg Mathes); 1983 edition by W. Kohlhammer, Berlin – ISBN 3-17-008658-8
- Das bittere Leiden unsers Herrn Jesu Christi (The Dolorous Passion of Our Lord Jesus Christ) (1858-1860 in a reworked edition by Karl Erhard Schmoeger; first authentic edition 1983, New edition by Bernhard Gajek and Irmengard Schmidbauer) ISBN 3-17-012652-0, ISBN 3-17-004917-8
- Das Leben der heil. Jungfrau Maria (The Life of the Holy Virgin Mary) (1852, posthumous) ISBN 3-557-91005-9, ISBN 978-3-557-91005-3, ISBN 3-7171-0961-8, ISBN 978-3-7171-0961-7
- Biographie der Anna Katharina Emmerick (Biography of Anna Katharina Emmerich) (unfinished, 1867–1870 in Schmoeger's edition; first authentic edition 1981)
- Tagebuchaufzeichnungen: Geheimnisse des Alten und des Neuen Bundes: Aus den Tagebüchern des Clemens Brentano (Notes from a Diary: Secrets of the Old and New Testaments from the Diaries of Clemens Brentano) ISBN 3-7171-0962-6, ISBN 978-3-7171-0962-4

=== Fairy tales ===
- Die Mährchen vom Rhein
- Italienische Märchen

== Sources ==
- Phillips, H. A., "Brentano, Clemens Maria" Cassell's Encyclopedia of World Literature New York: Funk & Wagnalls, 1953.
- Ripley, George; Dana, Charles A., eds. (1879). "Brentano, Clemens" . The American Cyclopædia.
