= Zanaida =

1763 opera by Johann Christian Bach

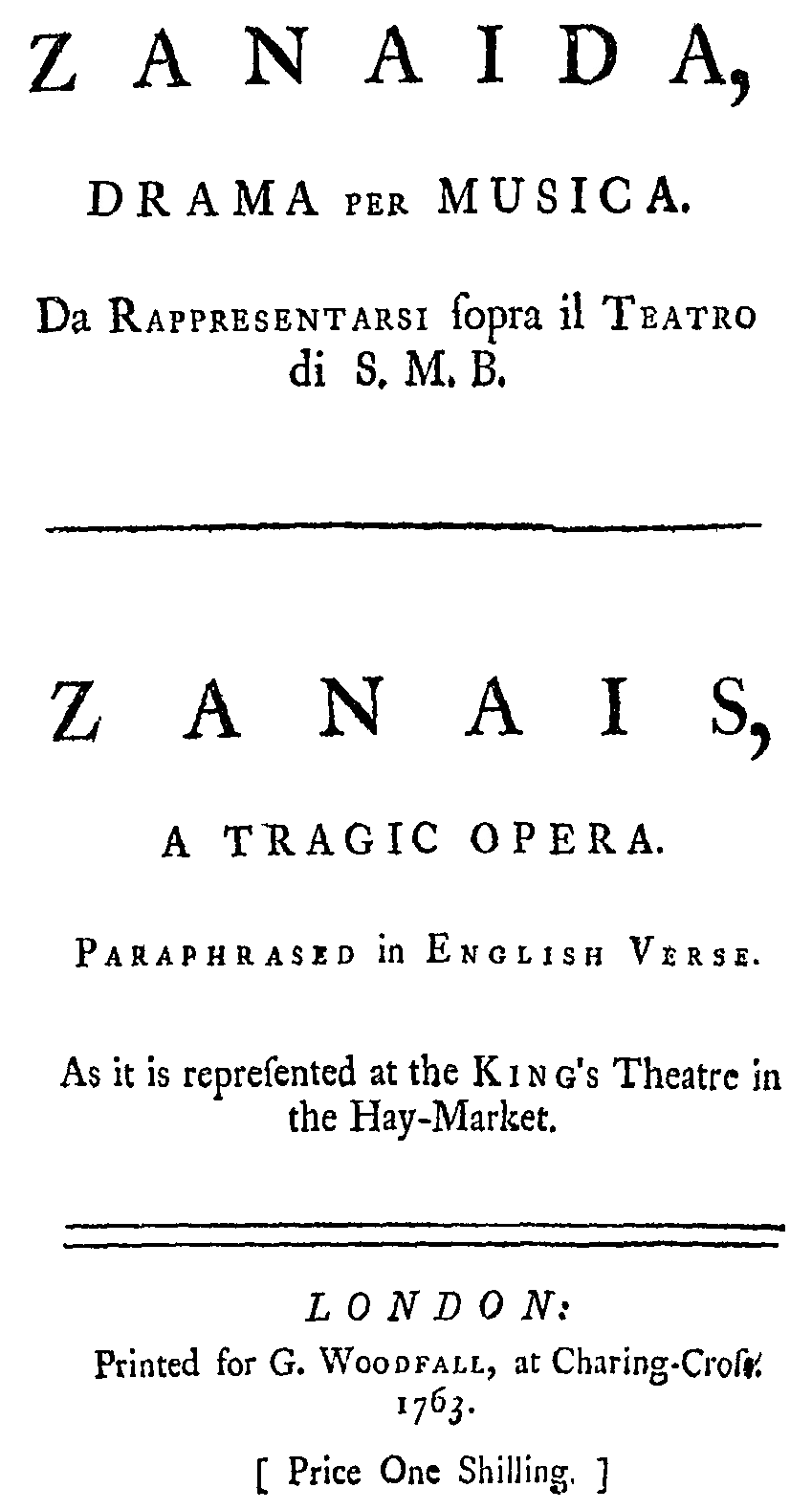
Title page of the libretto (1763)

Zanaida is a three-act opera seria with music by Johann Christian Bach and libretto based on Metastasio's Siface, re di Numidia by Giovanni Gualberto Bottarelli who relocated the action from North Africa to Persia. It debuted at the His Majesty's Theatre, London, on 7 May 1763.

== Recording ==
- Zanaïda Live recording. Conductor: David Stern, Ensemble: Opera Fuoco, Label: ZigZag, Date: November 2012
