= William Kreiten =

William Kreiten (21 June 1847, in Gangelt near Aachen – 6 June 1902, at Kerkrade (Kirchrath) in Limburg) was a literary critic and poet. At the age of sixteen he entered the Jesuit novitiate of Friedrichsburg in Münster. After receiving his classical education at Münster and Amiens, he began his philosophical and theological studies at Maria Laach Abbey in 1868, but was compelled to interrupt them the following year on account of ill-health. From 1869 to 1871 he pursued literary studies at Münster. When the Jesuits were expelled from Germany, in 1872, Kreiten was sent to Aix-en-Provence, where he completed his theological studies and was ordained priest on 8 June 1873. From 1870 to 1878 he was on the editorial staff of Stimmen aus Maria Laach in Tervuren near Brussels. In 1878 ill health compelled him to retire to Kerkrade, where he spent the remaining twenty-three years of his life in literary pursuits. He was one of the chief workers on Stimmen aus Maria Laach, to which he contributed numerous essays on literary subjects and most of the reviews of contemporary Catholic literature from 1874 to 1902.

== Critical works ==
- Voltaire, Ein Beitrag zur Entstehungsgeschichte des Liberalismus (Freiburg, im Br., 1878, 2nd ed., 1884);
- Molieres Leben und Werke (Freiburg im Br., 1887; 2nd ed, 1897);
- Lebrecht Dreves. Ein Lebensbild (Freiburg im Br, 1897);
- a critical edition of the poems of Annette von Droste-Hülshoff with an exhaustive biography of the Westphalian poet (Munster, 1884-6; 2nd ed., 1900 -);
- a series of twenty-one articles in Stimmen aus Maria Laach on Blaise Pascal and his works.
- He completed and published a biography of Klemens Brentano which had been begun by the friend of his youth, the Jesuit J. B. Diel, 2 vols., (Freiburg im Br., 1877); he also edited the other posthumous works of Diel, 2 vols. (Freiburg im Br., 1877);
- edited Clemens Brentano's Die Chronik des fahrenden Schulers (Munich, 1883; 2nd ed., 1888).
- His last work was a collection of eight hundred aphorisms entitled Allerlei Weisheit (Paderborn, 1901).

== Poetical works ==
- Heimatweisen aus der Fremde (Aachen, 1882), the second edition of which has many additional poems and is entitled Den weg entlang (Paderborn, 1889; 10th ed, 1904);
- translations of selections from the Provençal Christmas hymns of Louis Simon Lambert, entitled "Bethlehem" (Freiburg im Br, 1882; 2nd ed., 1895).
