= Sechs Lieder, Op. 68 (Strauss) =

1918 song cycle by Richard Strauss

Sechs Lieder
- Song collection by Richard Strauss
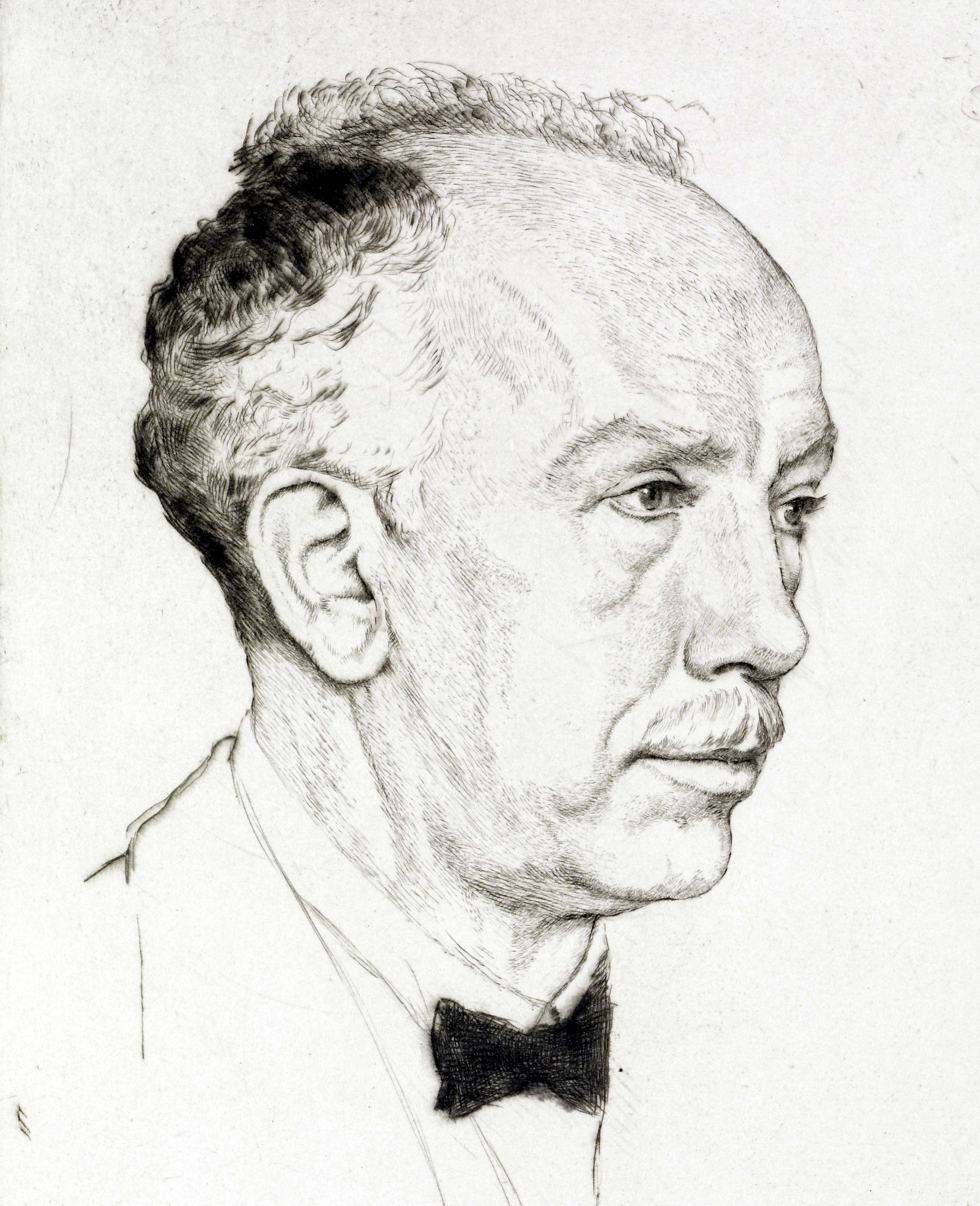
- The composer in 1917, drawing by Emil Orlík
- Other name: Brentano Lieder
- Catalogue: TrV 235
- Opus: 68
- Text: poems by Clemens Brentano
- Language: German
- Composed: 1918
- Dedication: Elisabeth Schumann
- Published: 1919
- Scoring: soprano; piano or orchestra

Sechs Lieder (Six Songs), Op. 68, is a collection of six Lieder (German art songs) by Richard Strauss. He composed them, setting poems by Clemens Brentano, in 1918 for soprano and piano, and orchestrated one in 1933 and five in 1940. The piano version was first published by Adolph Fürstner in Berlin in 1919. They are also known as Brentano Lieder.

== History ==
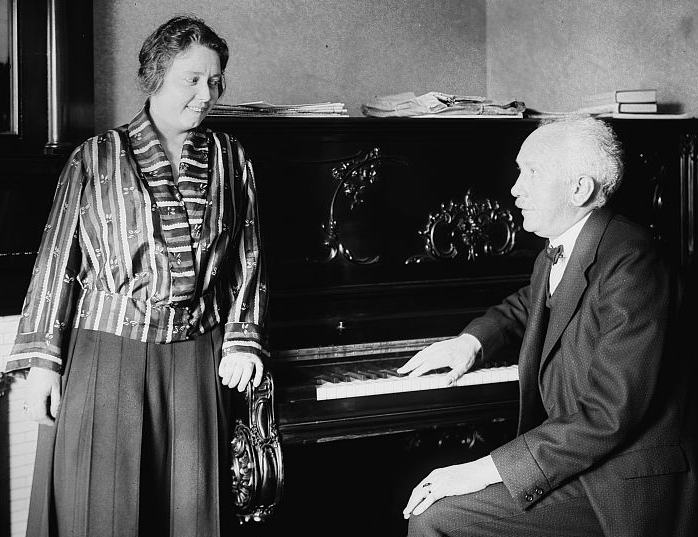
Elisabeth Schumann and the composer

Strauss, who had been a prolific writer of songs for voice and piano as a young man, composed no songs from 1906 to 1918, focusing on opera. Following the completion of his opera Die Frau ohne Schatten, he returned to the genre and set six poems by the Romantic poet Clemens Brentano as Sechs Lieder.

Clemens Brentano, together with his friend and brother-in-law Achim von Arnim, is known for the folk poem collection Des Knaben Wunderhorn. Strauss set three poems from the collection, but for Sechs Lieder turned to Brentano's own lyric. Their imagery inspired him to virtuoso vocal composition and intricate piano writing.

Strauss had the voice of Elisabeth Schumann in mind when he composed the songs, and dedicated the collection to her. While the central songs suit Schumann's light coloratura voice, the outer works require more dramatic expression. The Brentano Lieder became Strauss' most significant song collection before his Four Last Songs (1948). They were first published in Berlin in 1919 by Adolph Fürstner. The first five songs were first performed at the Berlin Singakademie on 30 May 1919 by Birgit Engell and pianist Georg Schumann, as part of the first festival Tonkünstlerfest of the association Allgemeiner Deutscher Musikverein after the World War, while the last one was premiered in Dresden on 29 September.

Strauss later set the songs for voice and orchestra. He first orchestrated No. 6 in 1933, the others in 1940. He dedicated a manuscript of the five songs to Eugen Antosch on 29 July 1949, writing: "Dem treuen Freunde und Helfer / Eugen Antosch / von seinem dankbaren / Dr. Richard Strauss. / Garmisch 29. Juli 1949" (To the faithful friend and helper E. A. by his grateful R. S.). The score is held by the Juilliard School Library.

== Structure ==
The titles of the songs are:

1. An die Nacht
2. Ich wollt ein Sträußlein binden
3. Säus'le, liebe Myrte!
4. Als mir dein Lied erklang
5. Amor
6. Lied der Frauen

"An die Nacht", with the incipit "Heilige Nacht! Heilige Nacht!" (Holy night), is a poem in three stanzas.

"Ich wollt ein Sträußlein binden" (I meant to make you a posy) is a poem in seven stanzas of four short lines each.

"Säus'le, liebe Myrte!" is a poem in three stanzas, with a longer last stanza.

"Als mir dein Lied erklang" is based on a poem "Dein Lied erklang" in two stanzas, with a shorter second stanza ending on the title line.

"Amor" (Cupid) is based on a poem in three stanzas of six lines each, with the incipit "An dem Feuer saß das Kind" (By the fire sat the child.

"Lied der Frauen" is based on a poem which Brentano had continued "(wenn die Männer im Krieg sind)" (When the men are at war). It is different in topic and expression from the other five, which can be described as love songs. It was not premiered with them in 1919, possible because it was considered too close to the war, and orchestrated separately.
