= David Stern (conductor) =

American conductor

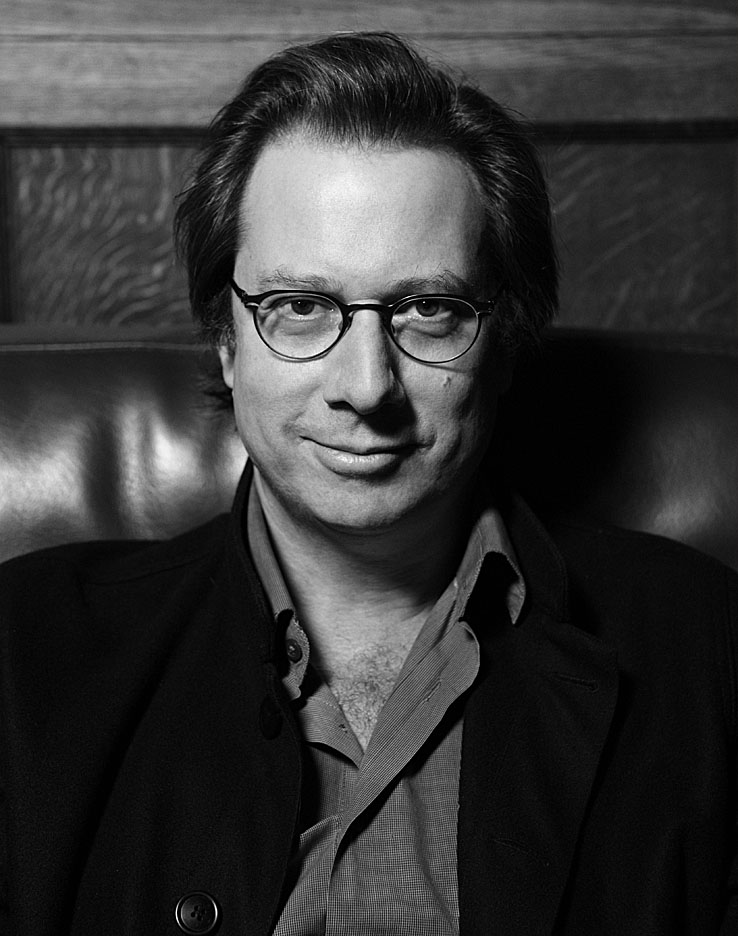
David Stern in 2009

David Stern (born 21 May 1963 in New York City) is an American conductor, director and founder of the ensemble Opera Fuoco. He has been the Chief Conductor of Palm Beach Opera since 2015.

== Life and career ==
Stern was born in New York, the son of violinist Isaac Stern and his second wife Vera née Lindenblit. In 1986 he received his BA from Yale University where he was the music director of the Yale Bach Society. He then studied conducting under Otto-Werner Mueller at the Juilliard School, receiving his Masters in Music degree in 1989.

He started his career as an assistant to John Eliot Gardiner, then as a principal guest conductor of Concerto Köln with whom he recorded John Field's piano concertos 2 and 3 for Warner Classics in 1999. At the same time, Stern conducted a number of orchestras and ensembles as a guest conductor, including Kammerorchester Basel, and the London Mozart Players, Boston Haydn and Haendel Society, the Jerusalem Symphony Orchestra, the Vienna Chamber Orchestra, the Seoul Symphony Orchestra, the New Moscow Symphony Orchestra, the Gürzenich Orchestra, the Orchestre de Paris and the Orchestra Nazionale de la RAI. From 2002 to 2005 he was Principal guest conductor of the Rouen Philharmonic Orchestra, under the direction of Austrian conductor Oswald Sallaberger.

In 2003 he co-founded (with violist Jay Bernfeld) the Opera Fuoco ensemble, which concentrates on the 18th- and 19th- century operatic and vocal repertoire using period instruments. Stern was Music Director of the St. Gallen Symphony Orchestra and Opera in Switzerland until the 2011/12 season when he was succeeded by Otto Tausk. From 2008 until 2014 he was also Music Director of the Israeli Opera. In 2015 he was appointed Chief Conductor of Palm Beach Opera.
