= Birgit Engell =

German opera singer

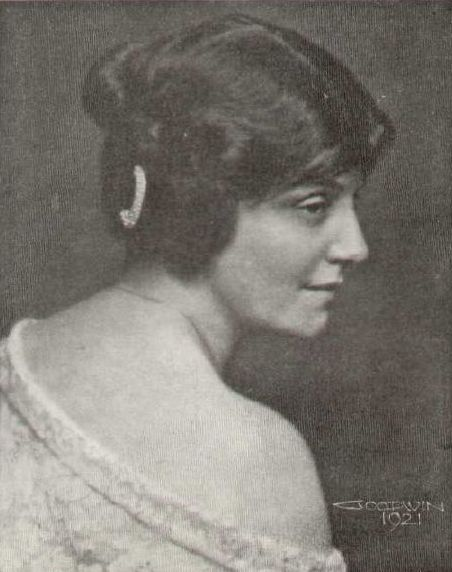
Birgit Engell (1921)

Birgitte Sigrid Frieda Engell née Engel (1882–1973) was a German-born Danish operatic soprano who initially performed in operas in Wiesbaden and Berlin before moving to the Royal Danish Opera in Copenhagen. After the First World War she increasingly specialized in concerts, giving recitals in several European countries and North America until the early 1930s. In later life she settled in Copenhagen where she taught voice.

== Biography ==
Born in Berlin on 18 September 1882, Birgitte Sigrid Frieda Engel was the daughter of the German factory owner Herman Adolph Engel (1849–1927) and his Danish wife Wilhelmine Sophie Charlotte née Rasmussen (1857–1938). In 1911, she married the German opera singer and voice teacher Hans Erwin Hey (1877–1943). The marriage was dissolved in 1926. In 1937, she married the proprietor Aage Nicolaj Bønløkke Nikolajsen (1877–1962).

Raised in Denmark, when she was 16 Engell was received voice training from the Hungarian soprano Etelka Gerstner in Berlin and later from Alfredo Cairati in Zurich. She first performed in 1907 in Wiesbaden taking the role of Gretel in Hansel and Gretel. While there, in 1911 she married fellow opera singer, the bass Hans Hey. Thanks to her talented soprano delivery, in 1912 she was engaged by the Berlin State Opera. The following year she appeared in the Berlin premiere of Richard Strauss's Ariadne auf Naxos. She remained in Berlin until 1920, singing a series of classical and modern coloratura roles and gaining a reputation as a competent performer.

While still in Berlin, Engell began to perform in concert recitals first in Copenhagen in 1914 and later in the Netherlands, England, Austria and the other Scandinavian countries. Her first concert in New York in November 1920 was well received. Her interpretations of Dagmar Rybner's "Pastoral" and Grieg's "Solveig's Song" both led to encores. From 1920 she appeared at the Royal Danish Theatre in a number of guest performances, receiving a full engagement in 1927. Her most successful roles were Rosina in The Barber of Seville and Susanna in The Marriage of Figaro but she is also remembered as Aase in Drot og Marsk, Sophie in Der Rosenkavalier and Mélisande in Pelléas et Mélisande.

Birgit Engell died in Grenå on 28 July 1973 and is buried in Gentofte.
