= Opera Fuoco =

Opera Fuoco is a French lyrical ensemble conducted by David Stern.

== Presentation ==
Founded by David Stern in 2003, Opera Fuoco dedicates itself to the interpretation of operatic repertoire from the beginning of the 18th to the end of the 19th centuries. Consisting of an orchestra playing on period instruments (Katharina Wolff first violin), Opera Fuoco works alongside young professional singers, recruited by audition. From 2008, the Opera Fuoco Troupe is officially created: two or three productions per year, individual support, master-classes, performances for professionals from the music world, etc... Stern and Artistic Advisor and Educational Director Jay Bernfeld jointly oversee the troupe's audition process and development.

In addition, David Stern strongly believes in bringing operatic repertoire to new audiences and particularly in making opera more accessible to children. Since the beginning of its residency at the Theater at Saint-Quentin-en-Yvelines in 2005, many activities were led for and with the children and their families. Elizabeth Askren supervises this educational work.

Opera Fuoco is in residence at the Théâtre de Saint-Quentin-en-Yvelines since 2005.

== The troupe ==
Created in 2008, the troupe consists of young professional singers, recruited by audition and offers a rigorous program over a two- to three-year period:

- masterclasses surrounding specific themes (the Baroque era, bel canto, role playing, the art of recitative) supervised by David Stern and Jay Bernfeld as well as by world-renowned singers (Jennifer Larmore in 2009, Paul Agnew and Isabelle Poulenard in 2010, and Veronica Cangemi in 2011)
- Individual support when needed as well as other artistic and/or career advice
- Musical Encounters: performances and introductions organized in prestigious venues for sponsors and music professionals.

== Educational activities ==
The activities below took place at the Théâtre de Saint-Quentin-en-Yvelines.

- 2012 : The Mikado, by Gilbert & Sullivan, with the scenic participation of children on stage
- 2011 : Activities around Donizetti's Rita
- 2010 : Adaptation of Handel's Giulio Cesare in Egitto, with the scenic participation of children on stage
- 2010 : Activities around Telemann's Orpheus
- 2009 : Activities around Mozart's Don Giovanni
- 2008 : Purcell's Dido and Æneas, with the scenic participation of children on stage
- 2006 : Activities around Mozart's La finta giardiniera

== Productions ==
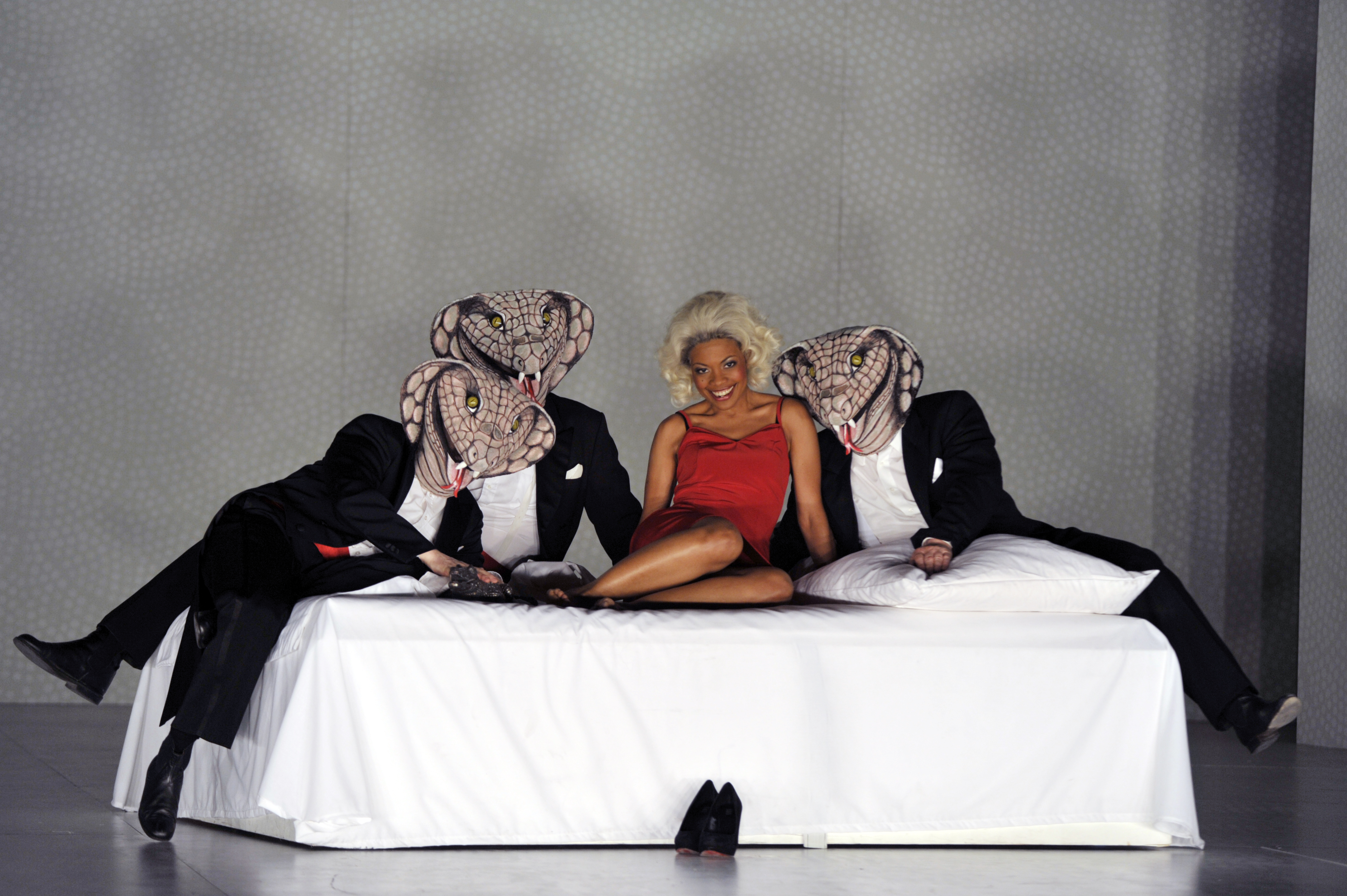
Luanda Siqueira dans Orpheus

- 2011 : Polixène, by Dauvergne, and Gluck's Iphigénie en Aulide
- 2011 : Zanaïda, by Johann Christian Bach
- 2011 : Donizetti's Rita
- 2010 : Telemann's Orpheus
- 2009 : Mozart's Don Giovanni
- 2008 : Purcell's Dido and Aeneas
- 2007 : Author of Figaro, Beaumarchais in Mozart and Paisiello
- 2007 : Telemann's Der Tag des Gerichts
- 2006 : Mozart's Der Schauspieldirektor & Salieri's Prima la musica
- 2005 : Mozart's La finta giardiniera
- 2005 : De Semele à Ino, le conte de deux sœurs, by Handel and Telemann
- 2004 : Handel's Jephtha
- 2004 : Mozart, air d'opéras et de concerts
- 2004 : Cherubini's Médée
- 2003 : Handel's Semele
- 2003 : Handel's Hercules

== Discography ==
- 2007 : Jephtha – Label Arion
- 2004 : Semele – Label Arion
