= Franz Xaver von Baader =

German philosopher and theologian (1765–1841)

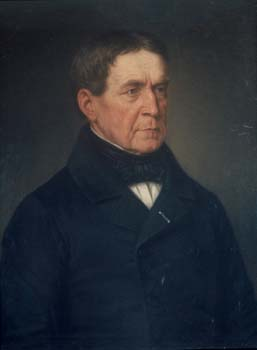
Franz Xaver von Baader

Benedict Franz von Baader (27 March 1765 – 23 May 1841), born Benedikt Franz Xaver Baader, was a Catholic theologian, philosopher, and mining engineer from Germany. Resisting the empiricism of his day, he denounced most Western philosophy since Descartes as trending into atheism and has been considered a revival of the Scholastic school. He was an important theorist of androgyny.

He was one of the most influential theologians of his age but his influence on subsequent philosophy has been less marked, and tends to be submerged into the esoteric discussions of later thinkers rather than cited explicitly in major publications. Today Baader is thought to have re-introduced theological engagement with Meister Eckhart into academia and even Christianity and Theosophy more generally.

== Life ==
Benedikt Franz Xaver Baader was born in Munich, Bavaria, on 27 March 1765. He was the third son of Joseph Franz von Paula Baader (Note: His first name is spelled "Josef" in some records.) (15 September 1733 – 16 February 1794) and Maria Dorothea Rosalia von Schöpf (25 October 1742 – 5 February 1829), (Note: In some records her middle name is spelled "Rosalie." Also, in some records her last name is spelled "von Schöpff". She was a daughter of Johann Adam von Schöpf (1702 – 10 January 1772).) who were married on 23 May 1761. In 1775, Franz's father Joseph became the court physician of Maximilian III Joseph, the elector of Bavaria. (The elector died two years later.)

Franz' two older brothers were both distinguished men. Clemens Alois Andreas Baader (Note: In some records, Clemens's middle name is spelled "Aloys" or "Aloysius".) (8 April 1762 – 23 March 1838) was an author. Joseph Anton Ignaz Baader (30 September 1763 – 20 November 1835) was an engineer.

Franz studied medicine at Ingolstadt and Vienna, and for a short time assisted his father in his medical practice. However, Franz soon discovered that life as a physician did not suit him, and he decided to become a mining engineer instead. He studied under Abraham Gottlob Werner at Freiberg, travelled through several of the mining districts in north Germany, and resided in England from 1792 to 1796.

In England, Franz von Baader became acquainted with the empiricism of David Hume, David Hartley, and William Godwin, which was extremely distasteful to him. But he also came into contact with the mystical speculations of Meister Eckhart, Louis Claude de Saint-Martin, and above all those of Jakob Böhme, which were more to his liking. In 1796, he returned to Germany and, in Hamburg, became acquainted with F. H. Jacobi, with whom he became close friends. He also came into contact with Friedrich Schelling, and the works he published during this period were manifestly influenced by that philosopher, though Baader maintained his independence from Schelling. (Note: On Baader's influence on and friendship with Schelling and the reasons for their eventual break with one another, see Zovko.)

Their friendship continued till about the year 1822, when Baader's denunciation of modern philosophy in his letter to Tsar Alexander I entirely alienated Schelling. During this time, Baader continued to apply himself to his profession.

He gained a prize of 12,000 gulden (≈117 kg silver) for his new method of employing sodium sulfate instead of potash in the making of glass. From 1817 to 1820, he held the post of superintendent of mines and was raised to the rank of nobility for his services. He retired in 1820, and thereafter published one of the best of his works, Fermenta Cognitionis in 6 parts from 1822 to 1825. In it, he combats modern philosophy and recommends the study of Böhme.

In 1826, when the new university was opened in Munich, he was appointed professor of philosophy and speculative theology. He published some of his lectures there in 4 parts from 1827 to 1836 under the title Spekulative Dogmatik.

His 1831 "Forty Sentences from a Religious Erotic" was dedicated to Emilie Linder, a Munich painter.

In 1838, he publicly opposed the interference of the Roman Catholic Church in civil matters and, in consequence, was interdicted from lecturing on the philosophy of religion during the last three years of his life. He died in Munich on 23 May 1841. He is buried in the Alter Südfriedhof in Munich.

== Philosophy ==
Baader frequently wrote in obscure aphorisms or mystical symbols and analogies. His doctrines are mostly expounded in short detached essays, in comments on the writings of Böhme and St-Martin, or in his extensive correspondence and journals. Baader starts from the position that human reason by itself can never reach the end at which it aims and maintains that we cannot throw aside the presuppositions of faith, church, and tradition. His point of view may be compared to Scholasticism, since like the Scholastics he believed that theology and philosophy are not opposed but that reason has to make clear the truths given by authority and revelation. In his attempts to draw the realms of faith and knowledge still closer, however, he approaches the mysticism of Meister Eckhart, Paracelsus, and Böhme. Our existence depends upon God's cognition of us. (Note: In Latin: cogitor ergo cogito et sum. ("I am thought of, therefore I think and am.") See also Descartes's cogito ergo sum.) All self-consciousness is at the same time God-consciousness, and all knowledge is knowing with, consciousness of, or participation in God.

== Theology ==
Baader's philosophy is thus essentially a form of theosophy. God is not to be conceived as mere abstract Being (Latin: substantia) but as the primary Will at the basis of all things and an everlasting process or activity (actus). This process functions as a self-generation of God, in which we may distinguish two aspects—the immanent or esoteric and the eminent or exoteric. Only insofar as the "primitive will" thinks or is conscious of itself can it distinguish knower and known, producer and produced, from which proceeds the power to become spirit. God has His reality only insofar as He is absolute spirit. The Trinity (called Ternar in Baader) is not a given but is rendered possible, is mirrored in, and takes place through the eternal and impersonal idea or wisdom of God, which exists beside through not distinct from the "primitive will". Personality and concrete reality is given to separate aspects of this Trinity through nature, which is eternally and necessarily produced by God. These aspects of existence do not occur successively within time but occur sub specie aeternitatis as necessary elements of the self-evolution of divine Being. Its "nature" is not to be confused with the nature of Creation, which is an unnecessary, free, and non-temporal act of God's love and will which cannot be speculatively deduced but must be accepted as a historic fact.

Created beings were originally of three orders: the intelligent or angels; the non-intelligent material world; and man, who mediated between them. Angels and man were endowed with freedom. The Fall of Adam and Lucifer were historic facts which were possible, though not necessary. Baader considered the angels to have fallen through a desire to ascend to equality with God (i.e., pride) and man through permitting himself to sink to the level of nature (via the various bodily sins). Baader considered that the world as we know it—with time, space, and matter—only began after the fall of mankind and was created as a gift from God permitting humanity the opportunity for redemption. Baader developed theories of physiology and anthropology over a number of works based upon this understanding of the universe, but in the main coincides with the ideas of Böhme. Principally, he traces the adverse effects of various sins and advocates the restoration of natural harmonies by its removal.

His system of ethics rejects the idea that obedience to moral laws alone (as in Kantianism) is enough. Instead, though humanity has lost the ability to accomplish this on its own, it is necessary to realize and participate in our place in the divine order. As grace is required for such a realization, no ethical theory neglecting sin and redemption is satisfactory or even possible. Mere works are never sufficient, but Christ's healing virtue must be received, chiefly through prayer and the sacraments of the church.

Baader was regarded as among the greatest speculative theologians of 19th-century Catholicism and influenced, among others, Richard Rothe, Julius Müller, and Hans Lassen Martensen.

== Politics ==
Baader argued that two things were requisite in the state: common submission to the ruler (without which there would be civil war or invasion) and inequality of rank (without which there would be no organization). As Baader considered God alone to be the true ruler of mankind, he argued that loyalty to a government can be secured or given only when it was truly Christian; he opposed despotism, socialism, liberalism equally. His ideal state was a civil community ruled by the Catholic Church, whose principles opposed both passive and irrational pietism and the excessively rational doctrines of Protestantism.

== Regarding the sexes ==
One of Baader's central ideas is his concept of androgyny:

The Androgyne is the harmonious fusion of the sexes, resulting in a certain asexuality, a synthesis which creates an entirely new being, and which does not merely juxtapose the two sexes 'in an enflamed opposition' as the hermaphrodite does.

Following the literal wording of the first of Genesis's two accounts of the creation of man, Baader says that Man was originally an androgynous being. Neither man nor woman is the "image and likeness of God" but only the androgyne. Both sexes are equally fallen from the original divinity of the androgyne. Androgynism is man's likeness to God, his supernatural upsurge. Hence it follows that sexes must cease and vanish. From these positions Baader interpreted the sacrament of marriage as a symbolic restitution of angelic bisexuality:

The secret and the sacrament of true love in the indissoluble bond of the two lovers, consists in each helping the other, each in himself, towards the restoration of the androgyne, the pure and whole humanity.

Ultimately Christ's sacrifice will make possible a restoration of the primal androgyny. Baader believed that primordial androgyny would return as the world neared its end.

== Works ==
Several years after his death, Baader's works were collected and edited by a number of his disciples. This was published in 16 volumes at Leipzig between 1851 and 1860, organized by topic. Vol. I dealt with epistemology, Vol. II with metaphysics, Vol. III with natural philosophy, Vol. IV with anthropology, Vols. V & VI with social philosophy, Vols. VII through X with philosophy of religion, Vol. XI with Baader's diaries, Vol. XII with his commentaries on St-Martin, Vol. XIII with his commentaries on Böhme, Vol. XIV with time, and Vol. XV with his biography and correspondence. Vol. XVI contained an index to the others, as well as an able sketch of his system by Lutterbeck. Valuable introductions by the editors are prefixed to the several volumes.

- Texte zur Naturphilosophie (1792–1808). Historisch-kritische kommentierte Ausgabe. Herausgegeben von Alberto Bonchino. Leiden/Paderborn 2021 (= Franz von Baader: Ausgewählte Werke, Bd. 1), ISBN 978-3-506-77937-3, E-Book ISBN 978-3-657-77937-6
- Texte zur Mystik und Theosophie (1808–1818). Historisch-kritische kommentierte Ausgabe. Herausgegeben von Alberto Bonchino. Leiden/Paderborn 2021 (= Franz von Baader: Ausgewählte Werke, Bd. 2), ISBN 978-3-506-78075-1, E-Book ISBN 978-3-657-78075-4
- Fermenta Cognitionis (1822–1825). Historisch-kritische kommentierte Ausgabe. Herausgegeben von Alberto Bonchino. Leiden/Paderborn 2024 (= Franz von Baader: Ausgewählte Werke, Bd. 3), ISBN 978-3-506-79027-9, E-Book ISBN 978-3-657-79027-2
- Vorlesungen über speculative Dogmatik (1828–1838). Historisch-kritische kommentierte Ausgabe. Herausgegeben von Alberto Bonchino. Leiden/Paderborn 2024 (= Franz von Baader: Ausgewählte Werke, Bd. 4), ISBN 978-3-506-79028-6, E-Book ISBN 978-3-657-79028-9
