= Jobst Oetzmann =

German film director and screenwriter (born 1961)

- Born: Jobst Christian Oetzmann; 4 November 1961 (age 63); Hanover, Germany
- Education: University of Television and Film Munich
- Occupations: Film director; Television director; Screenwriter
- Awards: Adolf-Grimme-Preis
- Website: jobst-oetzmann.de

Jobst Christian Oetzmann (born 4 November 1961) is a German film director and screenwriter. He is best known for directing several episodes of the police crime drama series Tatort, but he also made films based on literature, such as The Loneliness of the Crocodile, that were presented at international film festivals. He served on the board of the German national organisation for film directors from 2005 to 2014.

== Early life and education ==
Born in Hanover, Germany, Jobst Oetzmann began his film career without formal studies. At age 20, he began producing video films. He founded a company for their production in Munich in the mid-1980s, called Slim Jobst Oetzmann Produktion. From 1985, he studied at the University of Television and Film Munich, graduating in 1991 in film and TV drama. He also studied East Asian languages, Japanese and Chinese, but only for a short while, focusing on film. His first film for the cinema, Der Condor, was produced at the university during his studies and presented for the opening of the 1988 Torino Film Festival. He was also able to use the facilities for a short film, Only You.

== Career ==
His first film to receive international attention was The Loneliness of the Crocodile in 1999, based on a novel by Dirk Kurbjuweit. The music was composed by Dieter Schleip, whom Oetzmann knew from the time of their studies and who was his preferred composer. The film was presented at international film festivals such as the Cannes Film Festival. Its U.S. premiere was at the 2001 Brooklyn Film Festival under the title The Loneliness of the Crocodile. It also appeared at the Guggenheim Museum in New York City, and in Hong Kong. It was awarded the Bayerischer Filmpreis in the Producers category in 2001.

Oetzmann was a screenwriter and director of many popular TV series, such as Tatort (Crime Scene) and SOKO 5113. In 1998, the 400th episode, Tatort: Schwarzer Advent, was nominated for the TV prize Adolf-Grimme-Preis, and the 484th episode, Tatort: Im freien Fall, which premiered on 4 November 2001, won the prize in 2002. Oetzmann's film Coxless Pair was based on a novella by Kurbjuweit.

Oetzmann is a member of the national Bundesverband Regie and was elected to its board in February 2005. He served in the position until 2014.

== Awards ==
- 2001: Bayerischer Filmpreis
- 2002: Adolf-Grimme-Preis (for Tatort: Im freien Fall)
