= The Loneliness of the Crocodile =

- German: Die Einsamkeit der Krokodile
- Directed by: Jobst Oetzmann
- Produced by: Jobst Oetzmann
- Cinematography: Hanno Lentz
- Edited by: Christel Suckow
- Music by: Dieter Schleip
- Release date: 2000
- Country: Germany
- Language: German

The Loneliness of the Crocodile (German: Die Einsamkeit der Krokodile) is a German satiric crime film directed and produced by Jobst Oetzmann, based on a novel by Dirk Kurbjuweit. The director's first film for the cinema, it was filmed in 1999 and presented in 2000. It was a German contribution at the Cannes Film Festival, and was awarded the Bayerischer Filmpreis.

== Plot ==
Günther, the strictly raised son of a village butcher, becomes an outcast (Außenseiter) because his crazy ideas challenge the local community. He desires to escape his narrow surroundings, but ends up in a psychiatric clinic. Back in the care of his parents, he dies, allegedly by suicide. Elias, who trains to be a journalist, becomes intrigued in investigating this strange story of a lost life, and through it finds himself.

== History ==
The film was presented at festivals in Germany, at the Festival Max Ophüls, the Kinofest Lünen and the Hof International Film Festival. It was the German contribution at the Cannes Film Festival, and was also presented at the Forum du Cinéma Européen in Strasbourg. The film received its U.S. premiere at the 2001 Brooklyn Film Festival, and appeared also at the Hong Kong Film Festival, and at the Mill Valley Film Festival in California.

== Awards ==
- 2000: Bayerischer Filmpreis for the producer
- 2001: Preis der deutschen Filmkritik for the music
