= Joseph von Baader =

German engineer and rail transport pioneer

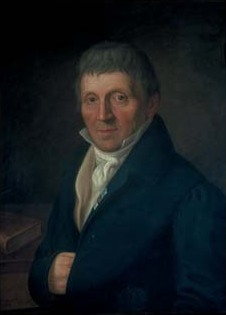
- Baader in an oil painting stored at the Bavarian Academy of Sciences
- Born: Joseph Baader; 30 September 1763; Munich, Electorate of Bavaria
- Died: 20 November 1835 (aged 72); Munich
- Occupations: Engineer; Medical doctor
- Known for: Railway pioneer in Bavaria
- Relatives: Franz Xaver von Baader (brother); Johann Adam Schöpf (1702–1772; grandfather)

Joseph von Baader (30 September 1763 – 20 November 1835) was a German engineer and medical doctor, chiefly known for his role as a pioneer of railway transport in Bavaria, alongside Joseph Anton von Maffei and Theodor von Cramer-Klett. He was the brother of mining engineer and Catholic theologian Franz Xaver von Baader.

== Life and career ==
Born into an environment of relative wealth – his father, Franz Joseph Baader, became Duke Clement of Bavaria's personal physician in 1768 – he originally also pursued a career in medicine. However, following his graduation in 1785, he decided to shift to studies of mathematics and physics instead, widening his knowledge in these areas through a study trip to England from 1787 to 1795, where he worked as a civil engineer.

After this period, he returned to Bavaria, where he joined the Bavarian Academy of Sciences in 1796. His theory of suction published in 1797 attracted the attention of the Elector Maximilian I Joseph of Bavaria, who in 1802 commissioned Baader with the creation of new fountains for the Nymphenburg Palace Park. In 1805, Napoleon Bonaparte called him to Paris, where he submitted plans for the development of a new engine for the Machine de Marly, though these were never realized. Starting in 1807, he began advocating for the construction of railway lines, his involvement in this cause going as far as to present a working model of a railcar in 1818, which he developed into a fully-sized machine in the following years. In 1815, Baader acquired the patent for a freight wagon that was able to travel by rail and road. In 1832, in order to develop the country to build a railway from Rosenheim via Miesbach, Tölz, Iffeldorf to Lechbruck and a canal from Iffeldorf to Lake Starnberg and on to Munich, Baader made a plea for a railway connection from Munich to Starnberg.

In 1810, he invented what is hypothesized to have been the first modern pedal boat. He was raised to Bavarian nobility in 1813.

Following the death of his daughter, Caroline, in 1834, von Baader's own health also began to deteriorate. He died on 20 November 1835.

== Bibliography ==
- Baader, Joseph von (1832). Vorschlag zur Herstellung einer Eisenbahn zwischen München und Starnberg (in German). Munich: Georg Franz.
- Barth, Johann Ambrosius (1811). Annalen der Physik (in German). Vol. 38.
- Bayern, Adalbert von (1950). Nymphenburg und seine Bewohner (in German). Walter de Gruyter GmbH & Co KG. ISBN 9783486776195.
- Ebnet, Werner (2016). Sie haben in München gelebt: Biografien aus acht Jahrhunderten (in German). Allitera Verlag. ISBN 978-3-86906-744-5.
- Rieck, Eckhard (2015). Friedrich Koenig und die Erfindung der Schnellpresse (in German). Akademische Verlagsgemeinschaft München. ISBN 978-3-96091-049-7.
- Schmid, Alois; Weigand, Katharina (2005). Bayern mitten in Europa: von Frühmittelalter bis ins 20. Jahrhundert (in German). C.H. Beck. ISBN 3-406-52898-8.
- Siber, Thaddäus (1836). Gedächtnißrede auf den verstorbenen königlichen Oberbergrath Joseph von Baader (in German). Wolf.
