= Maximiliane Brentano =

Friend of Goethe, mother of Clemens Brentano and Bettina von Arnim (1756–1793)

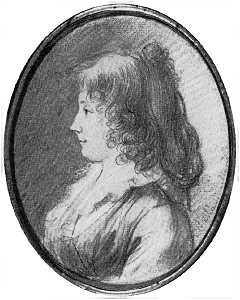
- Drawing of Brentano, before 1774
- Born: Maximiliane Euphrosine von La Roche; 4 May 1756; Mainz, Holy Roman Empire
- Died: 18 November 1793 (aged 37); Frankfurt
- Spouse: Peter Anton Brentano
- Children: Clemens Brentano; Christian Brentano; Bettina von Arnim
- Parent: Sophie von La Roche

Maximiliane Brentano (4 May 1756 – 19 November 1793) was a German woman who is known for her friendship to the young Johann Wolfgang von Goethe and as the mother of the Romantic writers Clemens Brentano and Bettina von Arnim. Born in Mainz, she was the daughter of the Protestant author Sophie von La Roche and the Catholic civil servant and court official Georg Michael Frank von La Roche. From 1771, they lived in Ehrenbreitstein near Koblenz, where her father served at the court of the Electorate of Trier. Her mother published her first novel and became a famous author, and the family residence became a literary salon visited by many notable writers of the era. These visitors included the poets Goethe and Johann Georg Jacobi, both of whom fell in love with Maximiliane, who was described as graceful and charming.

In 1774, she married an Italian-born businessman from Frankfurt, Peter Anton Brentano. Between 1775 and 1793, they had twelve children, of which eight survived to adulthood. In the same year as the birth and death of her twelfth child, Brentano died. She is remembered as part of the inspiration for Goethe's novel The Sorrows of Young Werther, where the dark eyes of the female protagonist Lotte are based on hers, and through the writings of her children.

== Family and early life ==
Maximiliane Euphrosine von La Roche was born in Mainz on 4 May 1756. (Note: Some sources give her birthday as 3 May or 31 May. For over a hundred years, the birthday was generally assumed to be 31 May until research published in 1973 by Hans Böhm clarified the date. The baptism register of the St Emmeran Church in Mainz gives a date of 4 May 1756.) Her mother was the author Sophie von La Roche (née Gutermann von Gutershofen) and her father was Georg Michael Frank von La Roche, an adopted and probably illegitimate son of Count Anton Heinrich Friedrich von Stadion, a high-ranking court official working for the Elector of Mainz. Maximiliane was baptised as a Catholic; the godparents were Maria Maximiliana von Stadion, the daughter of Stadion, and Euphrosyne Unold, Sophie's grandmother. Maximiliane was the oldest daughter among eight children, five of whom reached adulthood. While her father was Catholic, her mother was a Protestant and did not convert to Catholicism after her marriage.

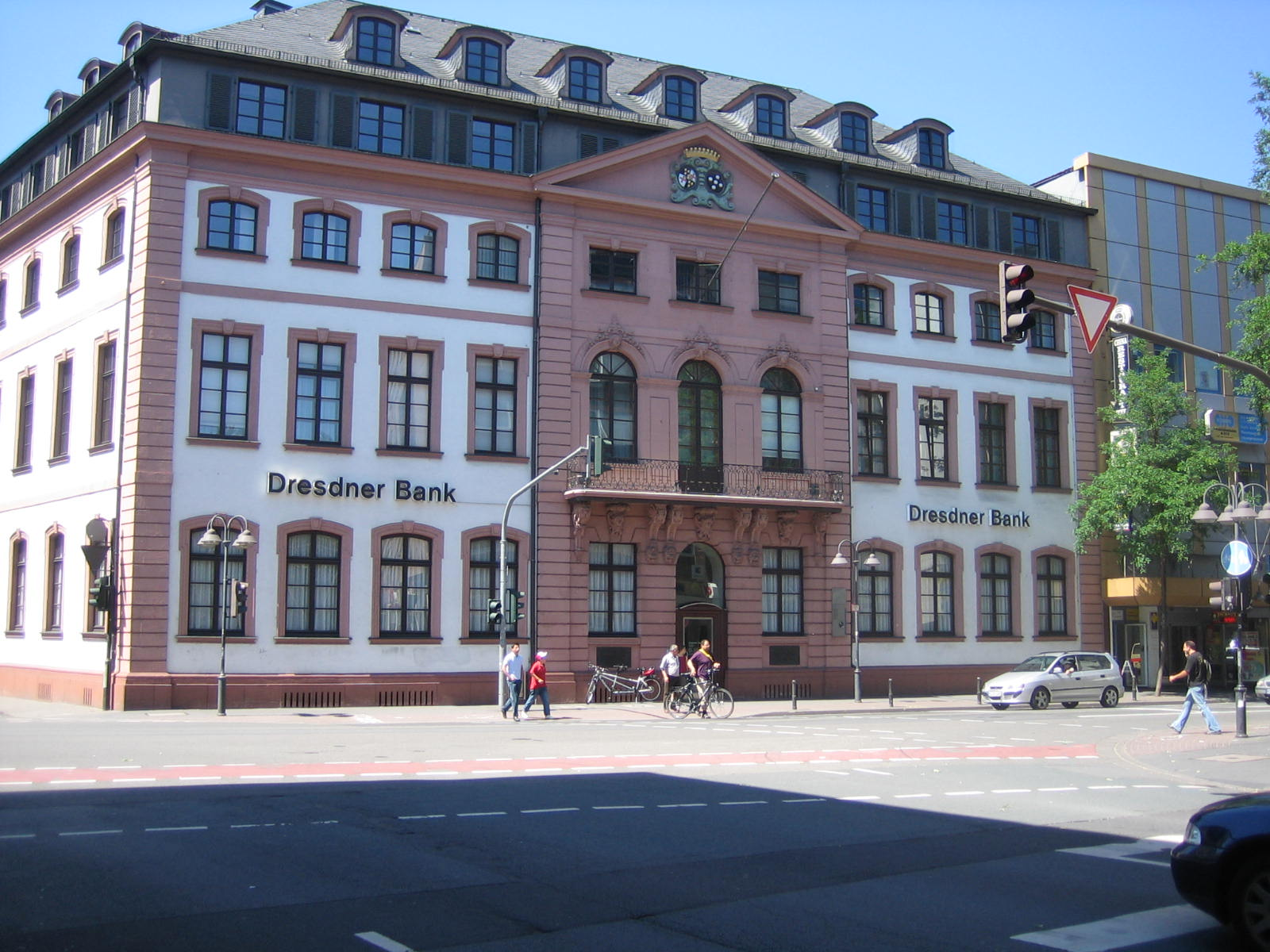
Stadioner Hof, Mainz

In Mainz, the family lived in the Stadioner Hof palace. After Stadion's 1761 retirement, they moved with him to Schloss Warthausen along with the rest of his family. From 1765, Maximiliane and her sister were educated in Strasbourg, at the boarding school of the St Barbara convent. When Stadion died in 1768, relations between his legitimate sons and La Roche were strained, and the family moved on to live in the Stadionsches Schloss, a castle in Bönnigheim, where Maximiliane's father had inherited a position from Stadion. In 1771, he became a high-ranking official as Geheimrat at the court of the Electorate of Trier, serving Archbishop-Elector Clemens Wenceslaus of Saxony, and the La Roche family moved to Ehrenbreitstein. Maximiliane also returned from Strasbourg to her family.

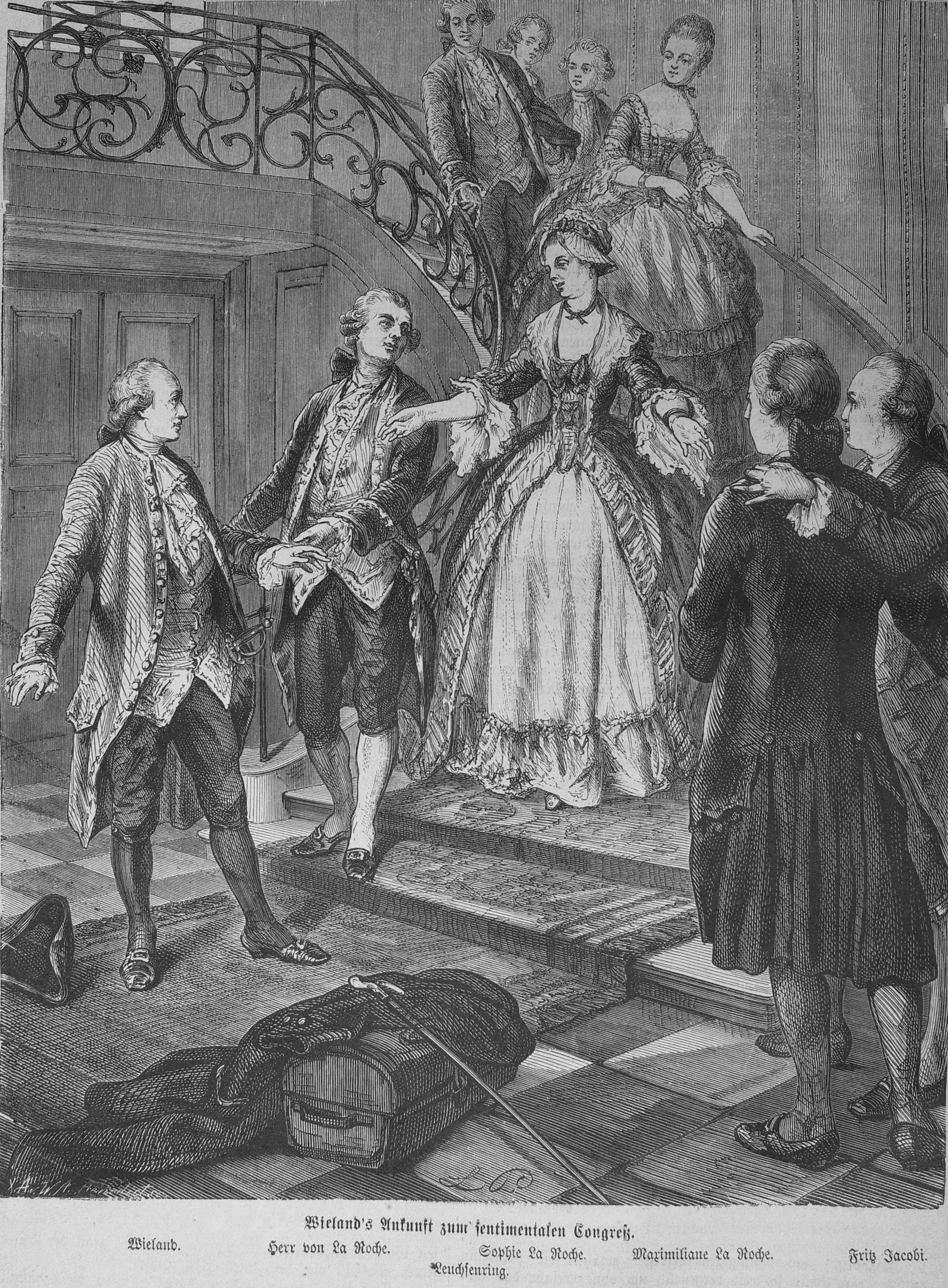
Wieland arrives for the sentimentalist congress, 1868. Maximiliane follows her mother down the stairs.

In the same year, Sophie von La Roche published her first novel, Geschichte des Fräuleins von Sternheim ('The Story of Miss von Sternheim'), quickly making her famous. The La Roche residence became a literary salon known for Empfindsamkeit ('sentimentalism'). Visitors included the poet Johann Georg Jacobi and his brother, the philosopher Friedrich Heinrich Jacobi; the educational reformer Johann Bernhard Basedow; the poet and theologian Johann Kaspar Lavater; and the authors Johann Jakob Wilhelm Heinse, Franz Michael Leuchsenring, and Johann Heinrich Merck. The young Maximiliane was gracious and charming and popular with the visitors; Johann Georg Jacobi considered her as a potential bride. Another visitor was Sophie's former fiancé, the author Christoph Martin Wieland, who described Maximiliane as la petite Sylphide aux yeux noirs ('the little sylph with black eyes'). According to a letter written by Sophie von La Roche to Lavater after 1791, the dean of St. Leonhard, Frankfurt, Damian Friedrich Dumeiz, an old family friend, had already in 1771 arranged a later marriage between Maximiliane and his nephew von Strauß. However, Friedrich Karl Joseph von Erthal, the future Elector of Mainz, became aware of this plan. The engagement was then called off for political reasons and to further von Strauß's career.

In 1772, the young poet and lawyer Johann Wolfgang von Goethe visited the La Roche family in Ehrenbreitstein, where he met the 16-year-old Maximiliane (generally known as "Maxe") and fell in love with her. Goethe described her later in his autobiography, Dichtung und Wahrheit ('Poetry and Truth'): "[H]is eldest daughter ... was nothing else but amiable. She was rather short than tall of stature, and delicately built, her figure was free and graceful, her eyes very black, while nothing could be conceived purer and more blooming than her complexion." Goethe had shortly before spent much of the year in Wetzlar, where he had been a friend of Johann Christian Kestner and had fallen in love with Kestner's fiancée, Charlotte Buff.

== Marriage and children ==
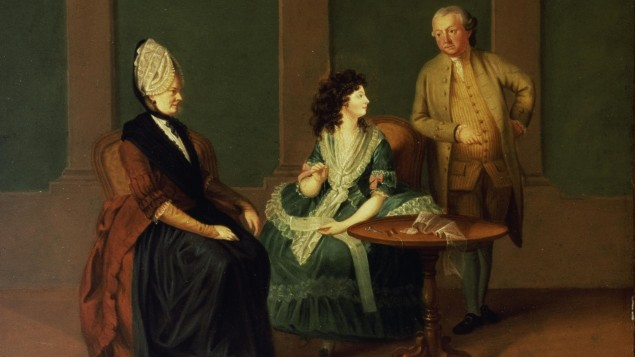
Georg Michael Frank von La Roche with Wife and Daughter, c. 1774

In 1773, acting on behalf of Sophie von La Roche, Dean Dumeiz arranged a potential marriage for Maximiliane. The groom was the merchant Peter Anton Brentano, born 1735 in Tremezzo, who had moved to Frankfurt in 1751. Peter Brentano was widowed after the 1770 death of his first wife Maria Josepha Walpurga Brentano-Gnosso (known as Paula) and already had five children. He did not speak German well. Agreement on the marriage was reached before 20 December and the engagement was made public on 26 December 1773. The couple were married on 9 January 1774 in the chapel of Schloss Philippsburg at Ehrenbreitstein. They lived in Nürnberger Hof in Frankfurt until 1778, when they moved to the Haus zum Goldenen Kopf in the Große Sandgasse road, which was located in central Frankfurt, close to the Goethe family residence and the cathedral. A portrait painting of her between her parents, Georg Michael Frank von La Roche with Wife and Daughter by Anton Wilhelm Tischbein was a copy probably made for her on the occasion of her wedding.

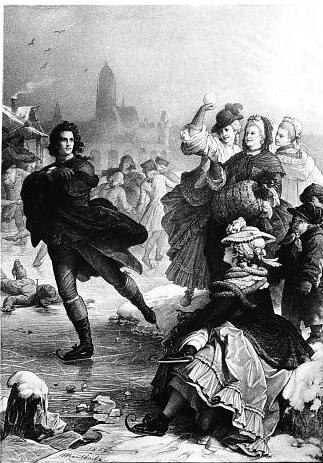
Goethe ice skating, Maximiliane Brentano throws a snowball while Goethe's mother and sister are watching. Drawing by Wilhelm von Kaulbach 1864.

Goethe was pleased at first that Maximiliane had moved to Frankfurt and was in regular contact with her and the family. She took part in an outing on the frozen Main river where Goethe went ice skating in January 1774. After initially being friendly with Goethe, Peter Brentano became increasingly suspicious and jealous and Goethe stopped visiting, possibly after being forced to do so due to an altercation. They met again at the celebration of the golden wedding anniversary of the merchant Allesina on 3 May 1774.

Maximiliane Brentano had twelve children, four of whom died young. For the birth of her first four children, she visited her mother in Ehrenbreitstein. The oldest child was Georg Brentano, later a businessman. He was followed by Sophie Brentano, who became a good friend of Wieland and his wife and died on their estate at the age of twenty-four. The third child was the writer Clemens Brentano, who became a major figure of German Romanticism. Probably in order to make life easier for their mother, Sophie and Clemens were sent to Koblenz in 1784, where they lived unhappily with their childless aunt Luise Möhn, who was married to a violent drinker. The fourth child was Kunigunde Brentano, who married the legal scholar Friedrich Carl von Savigny. The next child, Maria Brentano, died in Frankfurt at the age of three. Christian Brentano, the sixth child, was a Catholic writer who later edited the works of his brother Clemens. His children include the philosopher Franz Brentano and the economist and social reformer Lujo Brentano. The next child was born in Frankfurt, in the Haus zum Goldenen Kopf: the daughter Elisabeth Brentano, usually called Bettina or Bettine. She later married the writer Achim von Arnim; they both became important protagonists of German Romanticism. Ludovica Brentano (1787–1854), known as Lulu, the eighth child, married the businessman Karl Jordis, who became the court banker of Jérôme Bonaparte, King of Westphalia. Her younger sister Meline Brentano (1788–1861) married Georg Friedrich von Guaita, who became the first Catholic mayor of Frankfurt since the Reformation. Three further daughters died young: Caroline (1790–1791), Anna (1791–1792) and Susanna (May–September 1793). Soon after Susanna's death, on 19 November 1793, Maximiliane Brentano died in Frankfurt without a known previous illness.

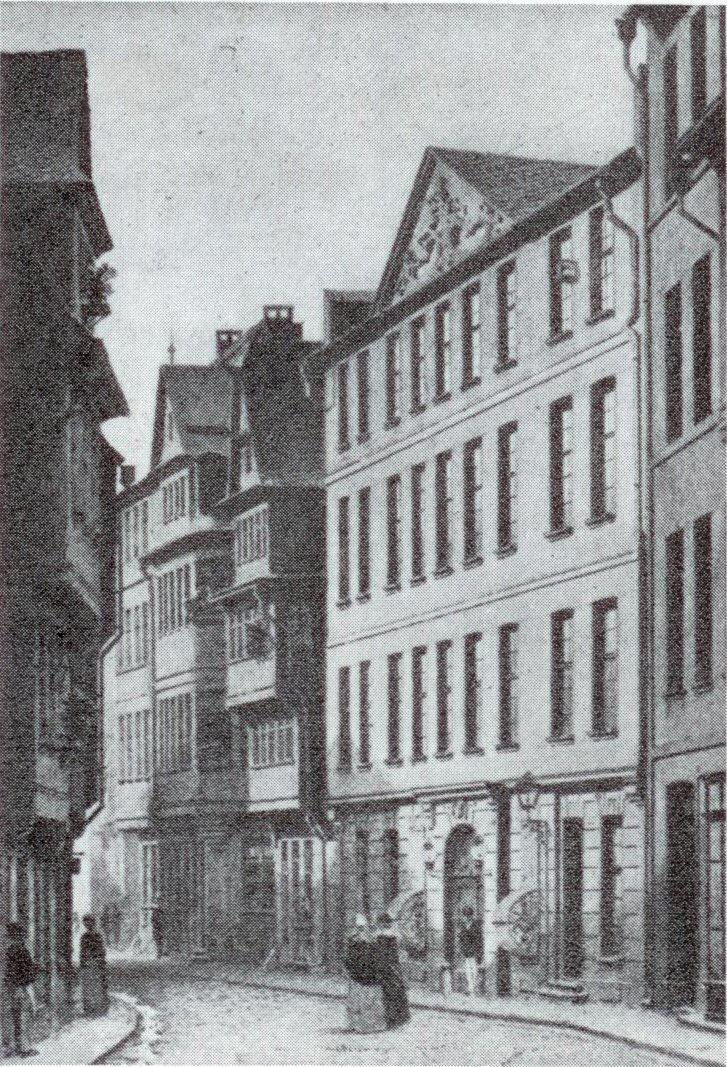
The Haus zum Goldenen Kopf in the 19th century

== Legacy ==
Goethe was motivated by the experience with Maximiliane and Peter Brentano to finish his novel The Sorrows of Young Werther. The main female character, Lotte, is based on Charlotte Buff, but especially in the second part has more features of Maximiliane Brentano. Similarly, Lotte's fiancé Albert, based on Kestner, has much of the dryness and jealously of Peter Brentano. Lotte's dark ("black") eyes are generally considered to refer to Brentano's, as Charlotte Buff had blue eyes.

Little of what is known about Brentano's life is from her own writing, although as of 2019, her correspondence with her father, which she conducted in French, had not yet been evaluated by scholars. Her letters to her children show her as a loving and caring mother. Six of her letters to Clemens, who was for a time at a boarding school in Mannheim, are extant, two of them in French.

Brentano's early death had a great influence on her son Clemens. In his only novel, Godwi or the Stone Statue of the Mother: A Novel Run Wild, there are no motherly figures in any of the families.

In 1806, Brentano's daughter Bettina found Goethe's letters to her grandmother that mentioned his love for Brentano. Fascinated by these, Bettina contacted Goethe's mother Catharina Elisabeth Goethe and struck up a friendship with her. She later used letters and memories in her fictionalised Goethes Briefwechsel mit einem Kinde ('Goethe's correspondence with a child', 1835), where she also wrote about her mother, a "great beauty" that appears "as in a dream".
