= Gleim =

Gleim may refer to:

- Johann Wilhelm Ludwig Gleim (1719–1803), a German poet
- 29197 Gleim, a main belt asteroid
