= Sophie von La Roche =

German writer (1730–1807)

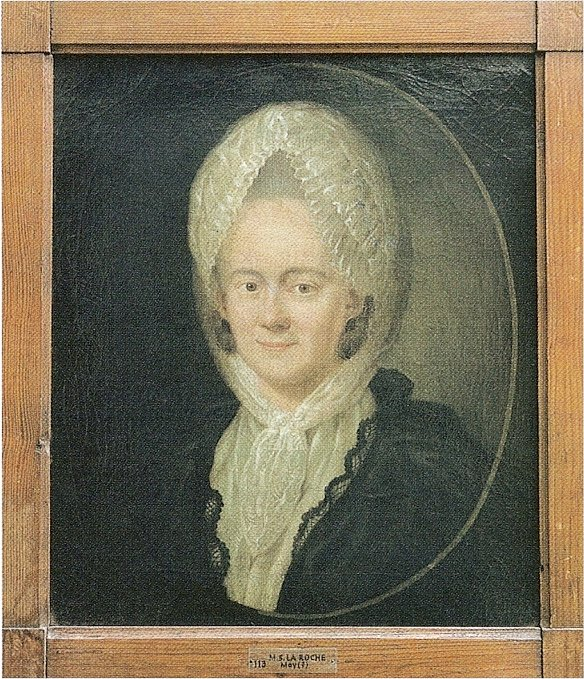
- Marie Sophie von La Roche
- Born: 6 December 1730; Kaufbeuren, Electorate of Bavaria, Holy Roman Empire
- Died: 18 February 1807 (aged 76); Offenbach am Main, Grand Duchy of Hesse
- Occupation: Novelist
- Spouse: Georg Michael Anton Frank Maria von La Roche (1753–1788)
- Children: 8
- Relatives: Clemens Brentano (grandson); Christian Brentano (grandson); Bettina von Arnim (granddaughter)
- Writing career
- Genres: Epistolary novel, autobiography, periodical literature
- Movements: Enlightenment, Empfindsamkeit

Marie Sophie von La Roche (née Gutermann von Gutershofen; 6 December 1730 – 18 February 1807) was a German novelist. She is considered the first financially independent female professional writer in Germany.

== Biography ==
Sophie von La Roche was born in Kaufbeuren, present-day Germany, the oldest child of the doctor Georg Friedrich Gutermann and his wife, Regina Barbara Gutermann (née Unold). Gutermann was originally from Biberach. La Roche spent the majority of her childhood in Augsburg, under strict Pietist upbringing, and made frequent visits to Biberach. There she became the friend of Christoph Martin Wieland, and became engaged to him.

In 1753, however, she married Georg Michael Anton Frank Maria von La Roche—completely surprising to her fiancé Wieland, who at the time lived in Switzerland. Georg von La Roche was an illegitimate son of Anton Heinrich Friedrich von Stadion and a dancer, Catharina La Roche. Stadion took custody of the boy and provided for his education as a secretary. Georg and Sophie had eight children, five survived past childhood: Maximiliane (1756–1793), Fritz (born 1757), Luise (born 1759), Carl (1766–1839) and Franz Wilhelm (1768–1791).

From 1761 to 1768, Sophie La Roche was a lady of the court at her father-in-law's castle Warthausen, near Biberach (where Sophie and Wieland encountered each other once again). There was a comprehensive library (1,440 volumes, 550 works) at the castle, which is today mostly at the Bohemian castle Kozel near Pilsen. She composed letter correspondence in court-sanctioned French and accompanied the Count often to his country estate in Bönnigheim. Through the Count's will, La Roche's husband was appointed as supervisor of the Bönningheim estates. La Roche followed her husband there in 1770, and it was there that she completed—on the advice of a parson friend—the novel she had already begun at Warthausen, Geschichte des Fräuleins von Sternheim (History of Fräulein von Sternheim). The novel was published by Wieland in 1771.

Georg von La Roche supervised the Stadion-Warthausen estates until 1771, when he became privy councillor of the Electoral Archbishop of Trier. The career change prompted a move for the family to Ehrenbreitstein. La Roche held a literary salon in their home in the borough of Koblenz, one that Goethe mentions in Dichtung und Wahrheit. Among the habitués were Johann Bernhard Basedow, Wilhelm Heinse, the Jacobi brothers, and Johann Kaspar Lavater. She became friends with Johann Heinrich Jung and introduced him to his second wife, Maria Salome von Saint George.

In 1780, La Roche's husband was fired from his office by Electoral Archbishop Clemens Wenzeslaus, due to his outspoken critical opinions of the church. With that, the elegant salon circle in Ehrenbreitstein came to a sudden end. The family was taken in by a friend in Speyer. In 1788, Georg's death left Sophie widowed. Due to the French Revolutionary occupation of the left bank of the Rhine in 1794, La Roche's widow's pension was cut off, so that she felt forced to secure her income through writing. After her husband's death, she spent her time in Speyer and Offenbach am Main, and traveled to Switzerland, France, Holland and England, which experiences prompted her to write and publish travelogues.

Through her daughter Maximiliane, who was married to the businessman and diplomat Peter Anton Brentano, La Roche became the grandmother of Bettina von Arnim and Clemens Brentano. When Maximiliane died in 1793, La Roche took in three girls of the couple's eight children.

La Roche died in Offenbach am Main. She is buried at the outer wall of the St. Pancras Church in Offenbach-Bürgel.

In the thirteenth book of his Dichtung und Wahrheit, Goethe writes of Sophie von La Roche:

"She was a wonderful woman, and I don't know another to compare her to. Slim and delicately built, more tall than short, she kept a certain elegance into her later years, an elegance which hovered charmingly between the behavior of a fine lady and a worthy middle-class woman."

== Literary-historical significance ==
La Roche's first novel, published by Wieland in 1771, was her most successful. However, she wrote several other novels. Her works were meant to be morally instructive for young women. Some like Schönes Bild der Resignation (1795), were written against the background of the post-revolutionary period. Further expression of the author's pedagogical project "to educate and advise young women about the art of living," came in the form of a periodical Pomona: Für Teutschlands Töchter (English: Pomona: For Germany's Daughters), which La Roche planned and edited and which was published 1783-1784.

Her work was representative of the Age of Enlightenment and the Sentimental movement (Empfindsamkeit) in German literature, and she was one of the most famous women writers of the 18th century. Her first novel Geschichte des Fräuleins von Sternheim can be considered a founding text for the German female literary tradition.

== Works in German ==
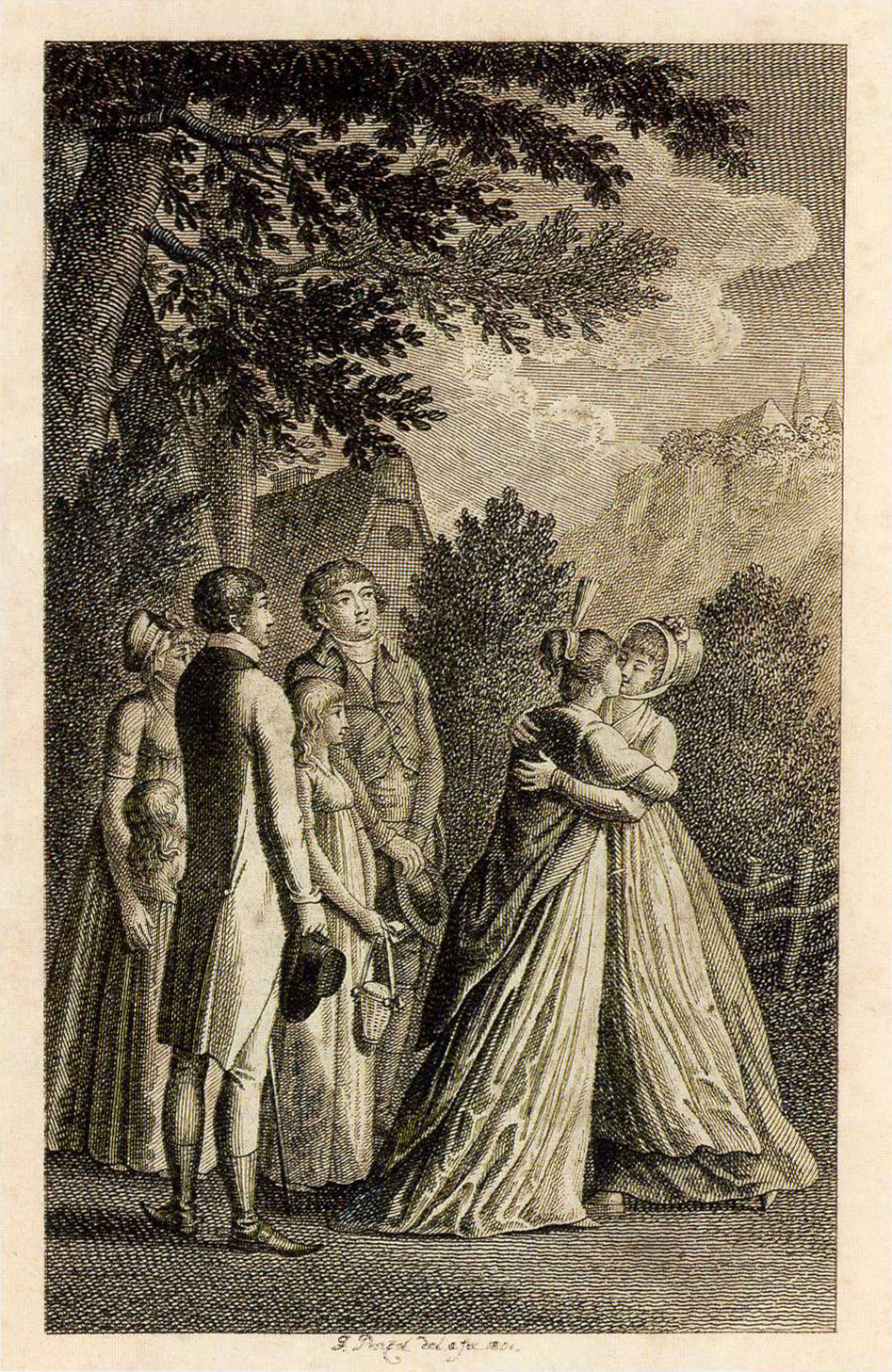
Frontispiece of Fanny und Julia

- Geschichte des Fräuleins von Sternheim. Von einer Freundin derselben aus Original-Papieren und andern zuverläßigen Quellen gezogen. Hrsg. v. Christoph Martin Wieland. 2 Bände. Weidmanns Erben und Reich, Leipzig 1771 (München 2007, dtv, ISBN 978-3-423-13530-6, Originalausgabe)
- Der Eigensinn der Liebe und Freundschaft, eine Englische Erzählung, nebst einer kleinen deutschen Liebesgeschichte, aus dem Französischen. Orell, Geßner, Füßli, Zürich 1772
- Rosaliens Briefe an ihre Freundin Mariane von St**. 3 Bände. Richter, Altenburg 1780–1781
- Pomona für Teutschlands Töchter. Enderes, Speyer 1783-1784
- Briefe an Lina, ein Buch für junge Frauenzimmer, die ihr Herz und ihren Verstand bilden wollen. Band 1. Lina als Mädchen. Weiß und Brede, Mannheim 1785; Gräff, Leipzig 1788
- Neuere moralische Erzählungen. Richter, Altenburg 1786
- Tagebuch einer Reise durch die Schweiz Richter, Altenburg 1787
- Journal einer Reise durch Frankreich. Richter, Altenburg 1787
- Tagebuch einer Reise durch Holland und England. Weiß und Brede, Offenbach 1788
- Geschichte von Miß Lony und Der schöne Bund. C. W. Ettinger, Gotha 1789
- Briefe über Mannheim. Orell, Geßner, Füßli, Zürich 1791
- Lebensbeschreibung von Friderika Baldinger, von ihr selbst verfaßt. Hrsg. und mit einer Vorrede begleitet von Sophie Wittwe von La Roche. Carl Ludwig Brede, Offenbach 1791
- Rosalie und Cleberg auf dem Lande. Weiß und Brede, Offenbach 1791
- Erinnerungen aus meiner dritten Schweizerreise. Weiß und Brede, Offenbach 1793
- Briefe an Lina als Mutter. 2 Bände. Gräff, Leipzig 1795-1797
- Schönes Bild der Resignation, eine Erzählung. Gräff, Leipzig 1796
- Erscheinungen am See Oneida, mit Kupfern. 3 Bände. Gräff, Leipzig 1798
- Mein Schreibetisch. 2 Bände. Gräff, Leipzig 1799
- Reise vom Offenbach nach Weimar und Schönebeck im Jahr 1799. Gräff, Leipzig 1800 (auch als Schattenrisse abgeschiedener Stunden in Offenbach, Weimar und Schönebeck in Jahre 1799)
- Fanny und Julia, oder die Freundinnen. Gräff, Leipzig 1801
- Liebe-Hütten. 2 Bände. Gräff, Leipzig 1804
- Herbsttage. Gräff, Leipzig 1805
- Melusinens Sommerabende. Hrsg. von Christoph Martin Wieland. Societäts-Buch- und Kunsthandlung, Halle 1806 (Digitalisat)

== Works in English translation ==
- La Roche, Sophie von. The History of Lady Sophia Sternheim. Trans. Christa Baguss Britt. Albany: State University of New York, 1991.
- La Roche, Sophie von. The History of Lady Sophie Sternheim. Ed. James Lynn. Trans. Joseph Collyer. Worcester: Billing & Sons 1991. Contains selected bibliography.
- La Roche, Sophie von. "Two Sisters". Bitter Healing: German Women Writers, 1770-1830. Ed. Jeanine Blackwell and Susan Zantop. Lincoln: University of Nebraska Press, 1990
- La Roche, Sophie von. Sophie in England, a translation of the passages on England in the Journal of a Journey through Holland and England (1788), trans. Clare Williams. London: Jonathan Cape 1933.

== Secondary literature in German ==
- Becker-Cantarino, Barbara: Meine Liebe zu Büchern. Sophie von La Roche als professionelle Schriftstellerin. Heidelberg: Universitätsverlag Winter, 2008. ISBN 978-3-8253-5382-7.
- Becker-Cantarino, Barbara; Loster-Schneider, Gudrun (Hgs.): "Ach, wie wünschte ich mir Geld genug, um eine Professur zu stiften": Sophie von La Roche (1730–1807) im literarischen und kulturpolitischen Feld von Aufklärung und Empfindsamkeit. Francke, 2008, ISBN 3-7720-8296-3.
- Eichenauer, Jürgen (Hrsg.): "Meine Freiheit, nach meinem Charakter zu leben". Sophie von La Roche (1730–1807) - Schriftstellerin der Empfindsamkeit. Weimar 2007, ISBN 978-3-89739-572-5.
- Haag, Klaus; Vordestemann, Jürgen (Hrsg.): Meine liebe grüne Stube. Die Schriftstellerin Sophie von La Roche in ihrer Speyerer Zeit (1780–1886). Marsilius, Speyer 2005, ISBN 3-929242-36-2.
- Jost, Erdmut (Kaufbeurer Schriftenreihe): Wege zur weiblichen Glückseligkeit - Die Welt ist das Buch der Frauen. Sophie von La Roches Reisejournale 1784 bis 1786 Bauer-Verlag GmbH, Thalhofen 2007, ISBN 978-3-934509-68-9.
- Mederer, Hanns-Peter : Romanschriftstellerin Sophie von La Roche - eine Tochter Kaufbeurens. In: Das schöne Allgäu 9. 1993, S. 40–42.
- Meighörner, Jeannine : "Was ich als Frau dafür halte". Sophie von La Roche. Deutschlands erste Beststellerautorin. Sutton, Erfurt 2006, ISBN 978-3-86680-062-5.
- Meise, Helga (Hrsg.): Sophie von La Roche – Lesebuch. Ulrike Helmer Verlag, Königstein/Taunus 2006, ISBN 3-89741-111-3 (ausgewählte Werke, darunter auszugsweise der Briefwechsel mit Wieland).
- Oehlmann, Melanie: Sophie von La Roche: Frau und Autorin im Zeitalter der Aufklärung: Wie Roman und Erzählung zur Schule der Frauen werden. VDM Verlag Dr. Müller, 2008, ISBN 3-8364-6660-0.
- Pago, Peter: Der empfindsame Roman der Aufklärung. Christian Fürchtegott Gellert und Sophie von La Roche. Meidenbauer Verlag, 2003, ISBN 3-89975-452-2.
- Strohmeyr, Armin: Sophie von La Roche. Eine Biografie. Reclam, Leipzig 2006, ISBN 3-379-00835-4.
- Wiede-Behrendt, Ingrid : Lehrerin des Schönen, Wahren, Guten. Literatur und Frauenbildung im ausgehenden 18. Jh. am Beispiel Sophie von La Roche. Lang, Frankfurt u. a. 1987, ISBN 3-8204-0961-0.

== Secondary literature in English ==
- Becker-Cantarino, Barbara: "Sophie von La Roche (1730-1807)." Women Writers in German Speaking Countries. Ed. Elke Frederiksen. Greenwood Press, 1998. 288-98.
- Baldwin, Claire. "Sophie von La Roche." Encyclopedia of German Literature. Ed. Matthias Konzett. Chicago and London: Fitzroy Dearborn, 2000. 630-631.
- Blackwell, Jeannie. "Sophie von LaRoche." German writers in the age of Goethe: Sturm und Drang to Classicism. Dictionary of Literary Biography. Vol. 94. Ed. James Hardin and Christoph E. Schweitzer. Detroit: Bruccoli Clark, 1990. 154-161.
- Blackwell, Jeannie. "Sophie von LaRoche." Bitter Healing. German Women Writers 1700-1830. Ed. Jeannie Blackwell and Susanne Zantop. Lincoln: University of Nebraska Press, 1990. 147-187.
- Dawson, Ruth P. "The Enabling Effect of Difference: Sophie La Roche (1730-1807).The Contested Quill: Literature by Women in Germany 1770-1880. Newark, Del.: University of Delaware, 2002. 92-154.
- Garland, Mary. "La Roche, Sophie von." The Oxford Companion to German Literature. 3rd ed. New York: Oxford University Press, 1997. 503.
- Joeres, Ruth-Ellen. "That girl is an entirely different character!" Yes, but is she a feminist? Observations on Sophia von La Roche's Geschichte des Fräulein von Sternheim." German Women in the Eighteenth and Nineteenth Centuries. Ed. Ruth-Ellen Joeres and Mary Jo Maynes. Bloomington: Indiana University Press 1986. 137-56.
- Lowry, Helen Mary : "Reisen, sollte ich reisen! England sehen!". A study in eighteenth-century travel accounts. Sophie von La Roche, Johanna Schopenhauer and others. Dissertation, Queen's University, Kingston, Ontario 1998 (Volltext, PDF).
- Petschauer, Peter. "Sophie von La Roche, Novelist Between Reason and Emotion." Germanic Review. Vol. 61, Spring 1982. 70-77.
- Stoicea, Gabriela. "When History Meets Literature: Jonathan Israel, Sophie von La Roche, and the Problem of Gender.” The Radical Enlightenment in Germany: A Cultural Perspective. Ed. Carl Niekerk. Leiden: Brill-Rodopi, 2018. 211-237.
- Stoicea, Gabriela. "Fictions of Legibility: The Human Face and Body in Modern German Novels from Sophie von La Roche to Alfred Döblin." Bielefeld: Transcript Verlag, 2020.
- Winkle, Sally. Woman as Bourgeois Ideal: A Study of Sophie von La Roche's "Geschichte des Fräuleins von Sternheim" and Goethe's "Die Leiden des Jungen Werthers". New York and Bern: Peter Lang, 1988.
