= Bettina von Arnim =

German writer (1785–1859)

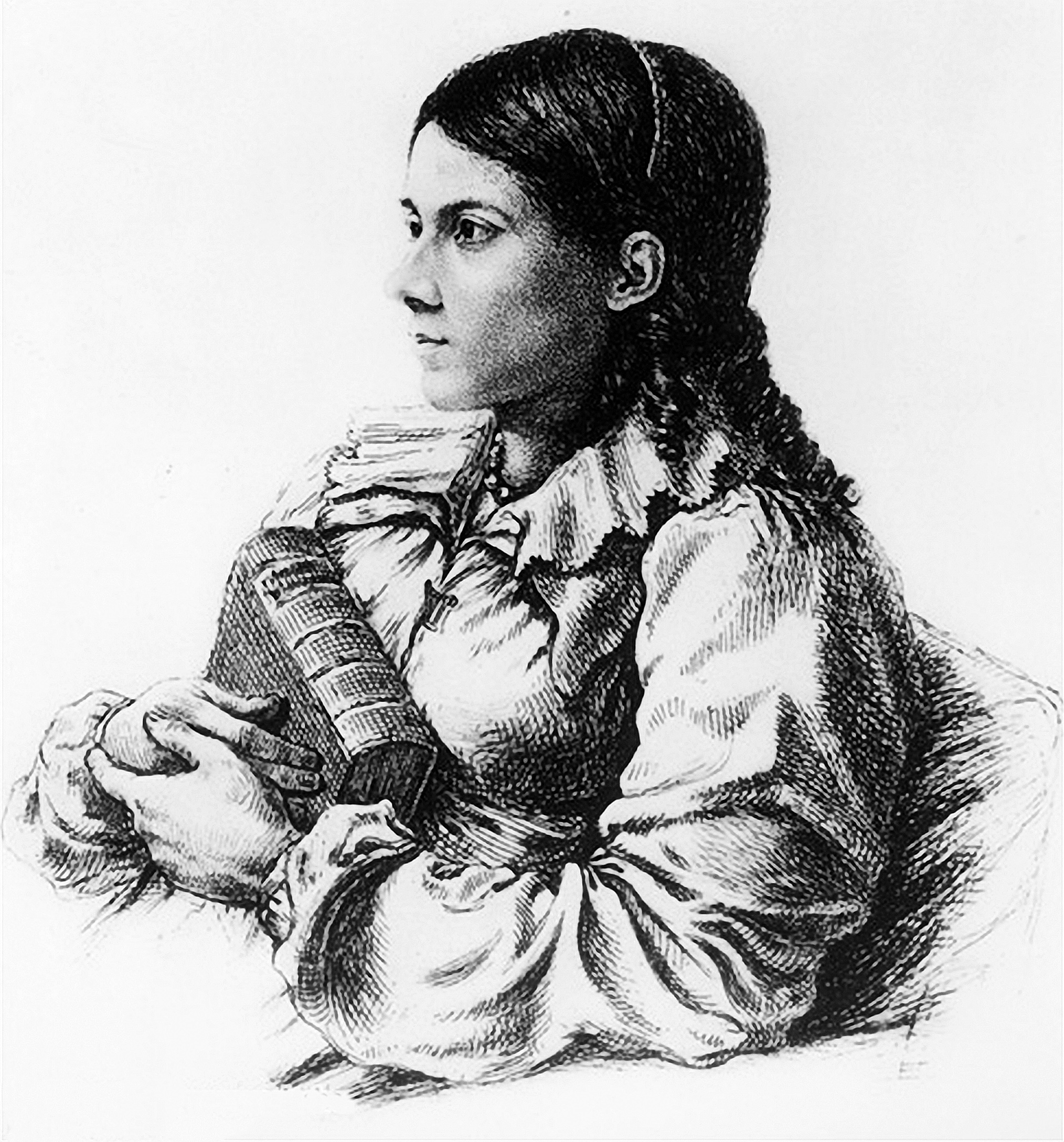
- Bettina von Arnim as drawn by Ludwig Emil Grimm during the first decade of the 19th century
- Born: Elisabeth Catharina Ludovica Magdalena Brentano; 4 April 1785; Frankfurt am Main, Holy Roman Empire
- Died: 20 January 1859 (aged 73); Berlin, Kingdom of Prussia
- Resting place: Wiepersdorf
- Occupations: Writer, publisher, composer, singer, visual artist
- Spouse: Ludwig Achim von Arnim
- Children: Gisela von Arnim
- Relatives: Sophie von La Roche (grandmother); Clemens Brentano (brother); Christian Brentano (brother); Franz Brentano (nephew); Lujo Brentano (nephew); Herman Grimm (son-in-law)
- Writing career
- Pen name: Beans Beor
- Language: German
- Literary movement: Romanticism

Bettina von Arnim (born Elisabeth Catharina Ludovica Magdalena Brentano; 4 April 1785 – 20 January 1859) was a German writer, composer, and novelist.

Bettina (or Bettine) Brentano was a writer, publisher, composer, singer, visual artist, illustrator, patron of young talent, and a social activist. She was the archetype of the Romantic era's zeitgeist and the crux of many creative relationships of canonical artistic figures. Best known for the company she kept, she numbered among her closest friends Goethe, Beethoven, Schleiermacher, and Pückler and tried to foster artistic agreement among them. Many leading composers of the time, including Felix and Fanny Mendelssohn, Robert and Clara Schumann, Franz Liszt, Johanna Kinkel, and Johannes Brahms, admired her spirit and talents. As a composer, von Arnim's style was unconventional, molding and melding favorite folk melodies and historical themes with innovative harmonies, phrase lengths, and improvisations that became synonymous with the music of the era. She was closely related to the German writers Clemens Brentano and Achim von Arnim: the first was her brother, the second her husband. Her daughter Gisela von Arnim became a prominent writer as well. Her nephews, via her brother Christian, were Franz and Lujo Brentano.

== Family and early life ==
Bettina von Arnim was born at Frankfurt am Main, into the large Brentano family of Italian merchants. Her mother Maximiliane Brentano died in 1793 at the age of 37. Her grandmother, Sophie von La Roche, was a novelist, and her brother was Clemens Brentano, the great poet known for his lyric poems, libretti, and Singspiele. He was a mentor and protector to her and inspired her to read the poetry of the time, especially Goethe. From an early age Bettina was called 'the kobold' by her brothers and sisters, a nickname that she maintained later on in Berlin society.

After being educated at an Ursulines convent school in Fritzlar from 1794 to 1797, Bettina lived for a while with her grandmother at Offenbach am Main and from 1803 to 1806 with her brother-in-law, Friedrich von Savigny, the famous jurist, at Marburg. She formed a friendship with Karoline von Günderrode. The two friends acknowledged only natural impulses, laws, and methods of life, and brooded over the "tyranny" of conventionalities. In 1806, Günderrode committed suicide on account of a passion for the philologist Georg Friedrich Creuzer. In 1807 at Weimar Bettina made the acquaintance of Goethe, for whom she entertained a significant passion, which the poet did not requite, though he entered into correspondence with her. Their friendship came to an abrupt end in 1811, owing to Bettina's behaviour with Goethe's wife.

In 1810, Bettina visited Vienna, staying at the home of her half-brother Franz Brentano and his wife Antonie. It was at this time she met Beethoven. She later claimed to have been instrumental in arranging the first meeting of Beethoven and Goethe at Teplitz in 1812, and published a letter supposedly written by Beethoven describing how while walking with Goethe, he had refused to step aside for visiting dignitaries while Goethe bowed - an incident that became famous, though the "greatest likelihood is that Bettina made it up".

In 1811, Bettina married Achim von Arnim, the renowned Romantic poet and member of the notable Arnim family. The couple settled first at the Wiepersdorf castle, and then in Berlin. They had seven children.

Achim died in 1831, but Bettina maintained an active public life. Her passion for Goethe revived, and in 1835, after lengthy discussions with the writer and landscape gardener Hermann von Pückler-Muskau, she published her book Goethe's Correspondence with a Child (German: Goethes Briefwechsel mit einem Kinde), which purported to be a correspondence between herself and the poet. The book is in large part fictitious. Genuine sonnets of Goethe in it were addressed, not to her, but to Minna Herzlieb. As a work of fiction, the book has been praised.

She continued to write, inspire, and publish until 20 January 1859, when she died in Berlin, aged 73, surrounded by her children. Her grave is in the Wiepersdorf churchyard.

== Career ==
During the years of 1806 to 1808, von Arnim helped gather the folk songs that made up Des Knaben Wunderhorn, the collaborative work of her brother and her future husband, Achim von Arnim. Some of the songs were later put to music by a number of composers, among them Gustav Mahler. The collection became a touchstone of the Romantic musical and poetic style. From 1808 to 1809 she studied voice, composition, and piano in Munich under Peter von Winter and Sebastian Bopp. She published her first song under the pseudonym Beans Beor, which she occasionally used later as well. Bettina sang briefly in the Berliner Singakademie and composed settings of Hellenistic poems by Amalia von Helvig.

Though domestic duties connected to her 1811 marriage to von Arnim diminished her productivity, several art songs from the period have been recovered and have been published in Werke und Briefe. Von Arnim was the first composer to set the poet Hölderlin's work to music.

She was a muse to the progressives of Prussia, linked to the socialist movement and an advocate for the oppressed Jewish community. She published two politically dissident works but evaded chastisement because of her friendship with the King of Prussia.

After the 1831 death of her husband, Bettina continued her dedication to the creative community. She published a collection of seven songs in public support of Prussian music director Gaspare Spontini, under duress at the time.

== Works ==
- Goethes Briefwechsel mit einem Kinde, 1835 (Goethe's correspondence with a child)
- Die Günderode, 1840 [Miss Günderode] (a fictionalized correspondence with her friend, the poet Karoline von Günderrode (1780–1806))
- Dies Buch gehört dem König, 1843 (This Book Belongs to the King)
- Clemens Brentanos Frühlingskranz, aus Jugendbriefen ihm geflochten, wie er selbst schriftlich verlangte, 1844 (Clemens Brentano's Spring Wreath, woven for him from the letters of his youth, as he requested in writing) (genuine letters to and from her brother)
- Ilius Pamphilius und die Ambrosia, 1848
- An die aufgelöste Preußische Nationalversammlung, 1849
- with Gisela von Arnim: Das Leben der Hochgräfin Gritta von Rattenzuhausbeiuns, 1840
- "Tale of the Lucky Purse" (German: Erzählung vom Heckebeutel), a tale that reflects the social sensibilities of the time in regards to the issue of poverty. It was part of her unpublished papers for her Armenbuch (documents of poverty). The tale also reworks the motif of the magical inexhaustible purse found in the European tale of Fortunatus.

== Letters ==
- Bunzel, Wolfgang, ed.: Bettine von Arnim: Letzte Liebe. Das unbekannte Briefbuch. Berlin 2019. Arnim's letters to her friend Julius Döring.
- Renate Moering, ed., Achim von Arnim – Bettine Brentano verh. von Arnim: Briefwechsel. 3 vols. Complete edition after the original manuscripts with commentary, Reichert, Wiesbaden 2019.
- Gajek, Enid and Bernhard Gajek, eds., Bettine von Arnim, Hermann von Pückler-Muskau, »Die Leidenschaft ist der Schlüssel zur Welt«. Briefwechsel 1832–1844 ("Passion is the key to the world." Correspondence 1832–1844), with commentary, Cotta, Stuttgart 2001, ISBN 3-7681-9809-X

== Legacy ==
The German-American settlement of Bettina in the state of Texas was founded in 1847, and named by its progressive, idealistic founders after Bettina von Arnim. Located near the juncture of Elm Creek and the Llano River, it lasted only a year. No trace of the Bettina community survives, though two of its three founders subsequently became prominent: Gustav Schleicher, later a U.S. congressman and namesake of Schleicher County, and Dr. Ferdinand Ludwig Herff, who in 1854 became the first surgeon to use anesthesia in Texas. The community's third founder was Hermann Spiess.

Part of von Arnim's design for a colossal statue of Goethe, executed in marble by the sculptor Carl Johann Steinhäuser (1813–1878), was displayed in the museum at Weimar in 1911.

The chamber opera Bettina by Friedrich Schenker, which was premiered in Berlin in 1987, deals with her friendship to Karoline von Günderrode.

Her relationship with Goethe featured in Milan Kundera's 1990 novel Immortality.

From 1991 until 31 December 2001, her portrait was on the German 5-Deutsche Mark bill.

Her friendship with Robert Schumann featured in Andrew Crumey's 2004 novel Mobius Dick. She is also mentioned in Crumey's 2023 novel Beethoven's Assassins.

In 2006, the German government turned Künstlerhaus Schloss Wiepersdorf, the estate of the von Arnims, into a literary institute. The institute contains a museum devoted to the von Arnims' literary legacy.
