= Anna Weidenholzer =

Austrian journalist and writer (born 1984)

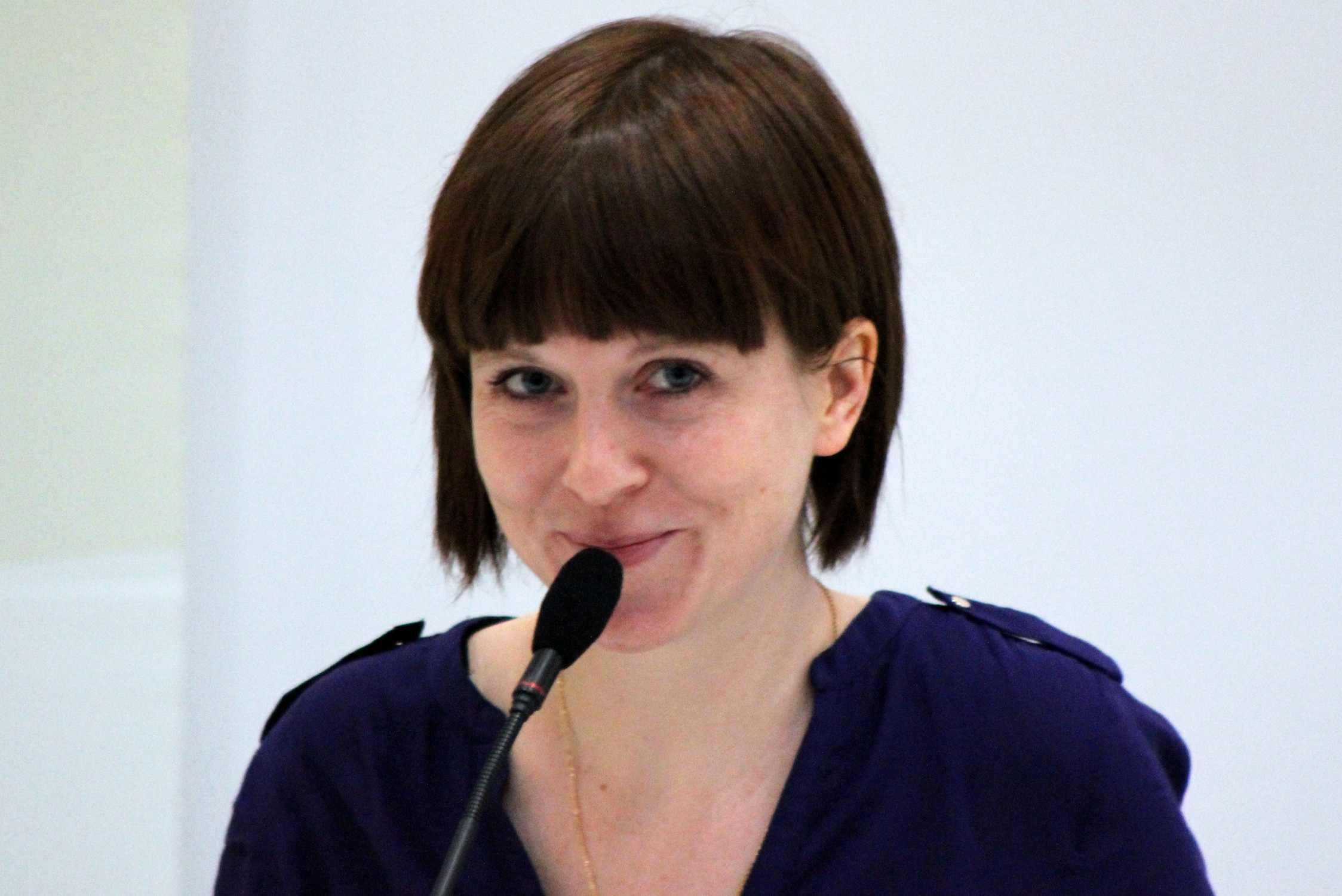
- At the Leipziger bookfair 2013
- Born: 1984 (age 41–42); Linz
- Writing career
- Language: German
- Genre: Journalism,

Anna Weidenholzer (born 21 January 1984 in Linz, Austria) is an Austrian journalist and writer.

== Life ==
Weidenholzer studied Comparative Literature in Vienna and Wrocław and graduated with a thesis on Bosnia and Herzegovina Intercultural Literature. She worked as a journalist for Oberösterreichische Nachrichten, and has been a freelance writer since 2010. In 2012, she was writer in residence at Kitzbuhel.

Her first book Der Platz des Hundes (2010) was nominated for the European debut novel festival in Kiel. In 2013, her book Der Winter tut den Fischen gut was nominated for the Leipzig Book Fair Prize, and she was awarded the Reinhard Priessnitz Prize.

== Awards ==
- 2009 Alfred Gesswein Literaturpreis
- 2011 Aufenthaltsstipendium Schloss Wiepersdorf
- 2011/12 Staatsstipendium für Literatur
- 2012 Aufenthaltsstipendium im Literarischen Colloquium Berlin
- 2012 Kitzbüheler Stadtschreiberin
- 2013 Reinhard Priessnitz Preis

== Works ==
- Der Platz des Hundes (Erzählungen, 2010) (ISBN 978-3-9502828-0-1)
- Der Winter tut den Fischen gut (Roman, 2012) (ISBN 978-3-7017-1583-1)
- Weshalb die Herren Seesterne tragen (Roman, 2016) (ISBN 978-3-95757-323-0)
- Finde einem Schwan ein Boot (Roman, 2019) (ISBN 978-3-95757-768-9)
