= Johann Wilhelm Ludwig Gleim =

German Enlightenment poet (1719–1803)

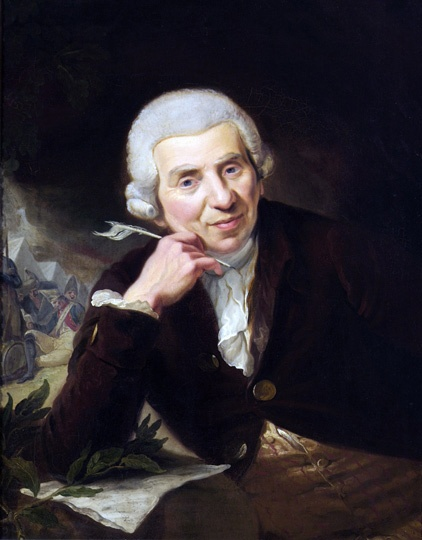
Ludwig Gleim, portrait by Johann Heinrich Ramberg (1789)

Johann Wilhelm Ludwig Gleim (2 April 1719 – 18 February 1803) was a German poet, commonly associated with the Enlightenment and Rococo movements.

== Life ==
Gleim was born at the small town of Ermsleben in the Principality of Halberstadt, then part of Prussia. His father, a tax collector, and his mother died early. He attended school in Wernigerode and from 1738 onwards studied law at the University of Halle, where he established a circle of young poets together with his friends Johann Uz and Johann Nikolaus Götz.

Having obtained his final degree, he worked as a tutor in Berlin, where in 1743–44 he became secretary to the Hohenzollern prince Frederick William of Brandenburg-Schwedt. Gleim accompanied his employer in the Second Silesian War and made the acquaintance of Ewald Christian von Kleist, whose devoted friend he became. When the prince was killed during the Prussian siege of Prague, Gleim became secretary to Prince Leopold of Anhalt-Dessau; but he soon gave up his position, not being able to bear the roughness of the "Old Dessauer".

In 1747, after again living in Berlin for a few years, he was appointed secretary of the Halberstadt Cathedral chapter. From 1756 he also served as a canon at the nearby Walbeck monastery. He became known as "Father Gleim" throughout all literary Germany on account of his kind-hearted though inconsiderate and undiscriminating patronage alike of the poets and poetasters of the period.

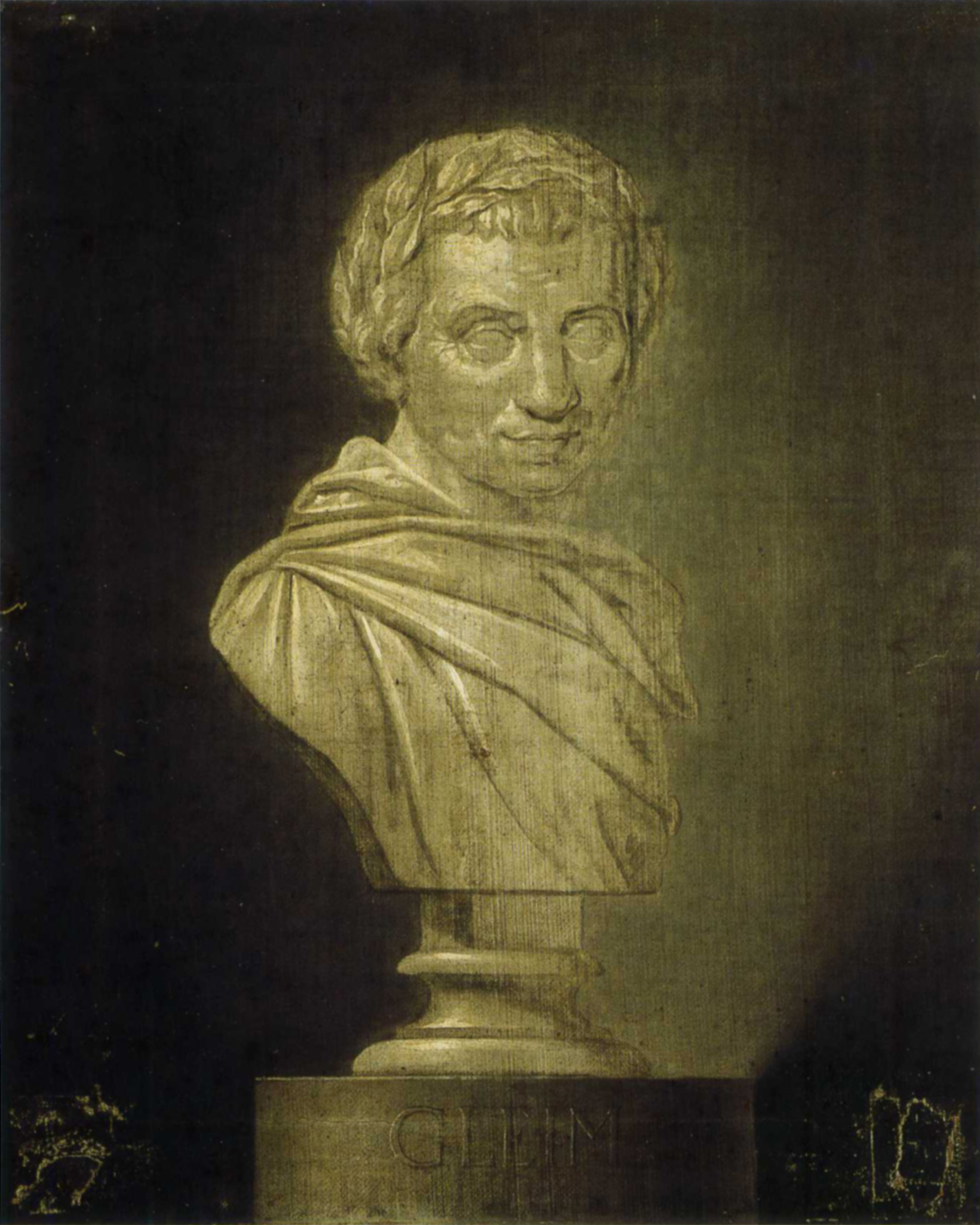
Portrait by Johann Peter von Langer (1797)

He died at the age of 83 in Halberstadt, then completely blind, but a wealthy and respected citizen. He was buried in his garden on the Holtemme river.

== Work ==
Gleim's Collected Works appeared in seven volumes from 1811 until 1813; a reprint of the Lieder eines Grenadiers was published by A. Sauer in 1882. A good selection of Gleim's poetry was published in Franz Muncker's Anakreontiker und preussisch-patriotische Lyriker (1894) and Friedrich Wilhelm Körte's Gleims Leben aus seinen Briefen und Schriften (1811). His correspondence with Johann Jakob Wilhelm Heinse was published in two volumes (1894/1896), with Johann Uz (1889), in both cases edited by C. Schüddekopf.

Influenced by the aesthetic writings of Alexander Gottlieb Baumgarten and Georg Friedrich Meier, both lecturers at the Halle university, Gleim attempted to cultivate the Anacreontic tradition of short lyrical pieces of an easy kind. He wrote a large number of imitations of Anacreon, Horace and the minnesingers, a didactic poem inspired from his reading in the Quran entitled Halladat oder das rote Buch (1774), and collections of fables and romances. Many of his poems were set to music: C.P.E. Bach, Beethoven, Joseph Haydn, Reichardt, Schubart, and Spohr all set some of his Anacreontic poems.

Of higher merit are his Preussische Kriegslieder von einem Grenadier (1758). Inspired by the Prussian campaigns of King Frederick the Great in the Seven Years' War, they are often distinguished by genuine feeling and vigorous force of expression. They are also noteworthy as being the first of that long series of noble political songs in which later German literature is so rich. Written in a Chevy Chase tune and first set to music by Christian Gottfried Krause, the Kriegslieder attracted wide attention in a poetry collection edited by Lessing in 1758, and later were also set by Telemann and Schubart.

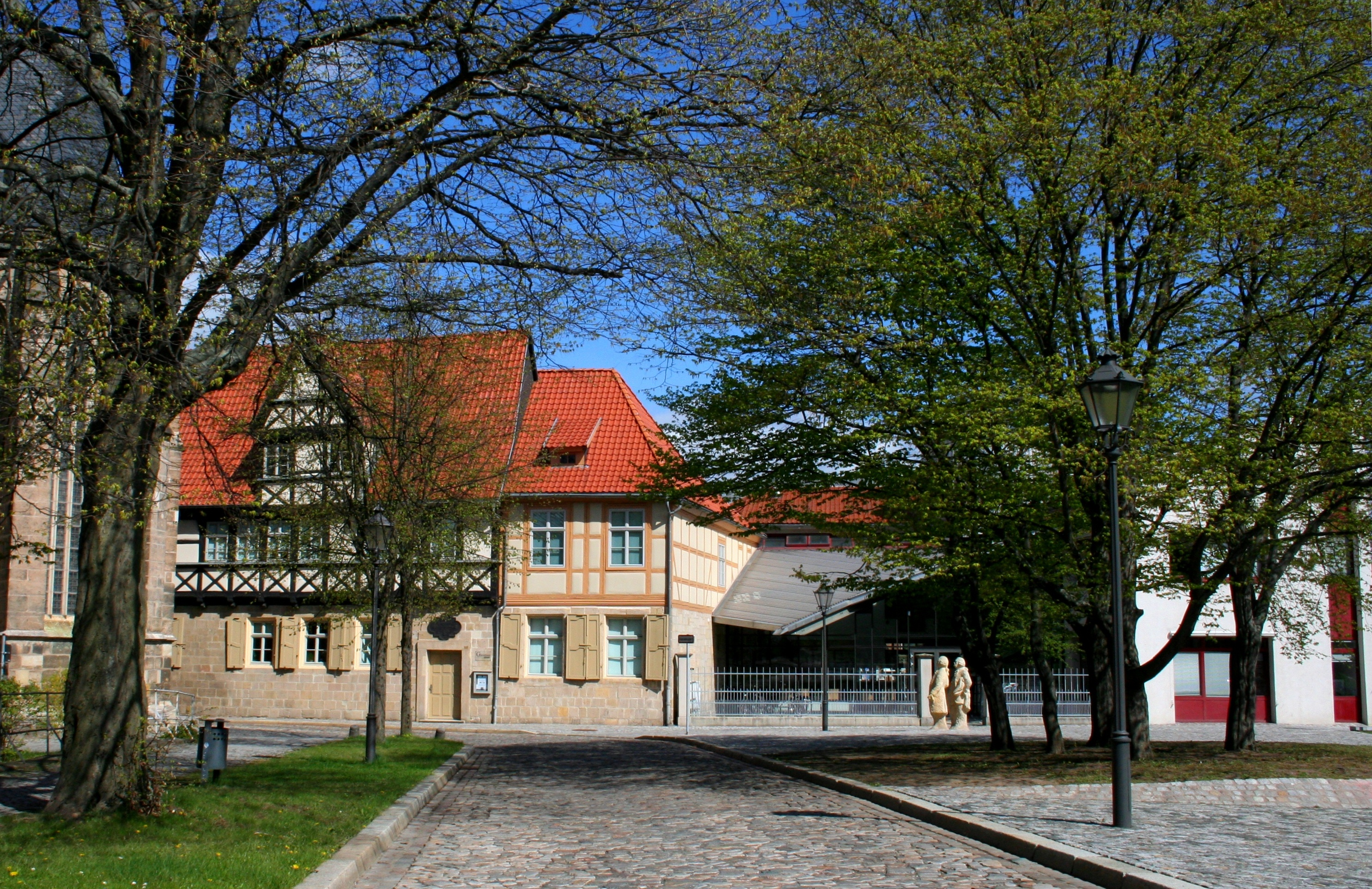
Gleimhaus in Halberstadt

Compared to this collection, Gleim's other writings, though also very popular in his day, were for the most part considered commonplace in thought and expression by later generations. Only recently, a revaluation of his work in the context of 18th century literary history has taken place. Significant contributions of Gleim include the establishment of German as literary language and his promotion of young talents such as Heinse, Johann Heinrich Voss, Seume, and Jean Paul.

== Gleimhaus ==
After Gleim's death in Halberstadt, his personal effects were carefully looked after by his great-nephew, Friedrich Wilhelm Körte (1776–1846). In 1862, Gleim's library of 12,000 books (including 50 incunabula) and the huge collection of letters, manuscripts and documents in his estate were used as the kernel of a museum of 18th-century literary life in Halberstadt and beyond. Augmented by the collection of the local poet Christian Friedrich Bernhard Augustin (1771–1856), the Gleimhaus is still in operation nowadays as "Gleimhaus – Museum der deutschen Aufklärung" (Gleim House – Museum of the German Enlightenment) and is one of the oldest literary museums in Germany.

== Temple of Friendship ==
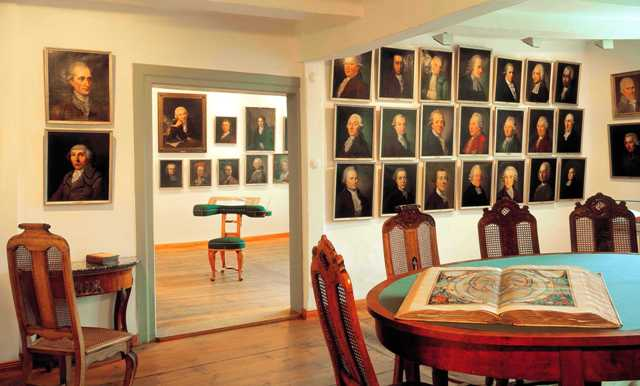
Temple of Friendship

At his house near Halberstadt Cathedral, Gleim created a Temple of Friendship (Freundschaftstempel), regular meetings of poets and intellectuals including Johann Georg Jacobi, Heinse, Christoph August Tiedge, Leopold Friedrich Günther von Goeckingk and many others. Two rooms he devoted to a collection of portraits of friends, which numbered more than 120 by the time of his death. Artists commissioned by Gleim included Anton Graff, various members of the Tischbein family, Bernhard Rode and Benjamin Calau.

== Gleim Prize ==
The Gleim Prize for Literature (Gleim-Literaturpreis), awarded for outstanding non-fiction on the subject of 18th century literature, was established in 1995.

- 1995 Heinz Dieter Kittsteiner
- 1997 Gudrun Gersmann
- 1999 Jürgen Osterhammel
- 2001 Martin Geck
- 2003 Christoph Schulte
- 2005 Angela Steidele
- 2007 Günter de Bruyn
- 2009 Mark-Georg Dehrmann
- 2011 Philipp Blom
- 2013 Beatrix Langner
- 2015 Jürgen Goldstein
- 2017 Volker Hagedorn
- 2019 Patrick Stoffel
- 2021 Heinrich Detering
- 2023 Eva Seemann
- 2025 Michael Maul
