= Benjamin Calau =

German painter

Benjamin Calau (1724–1785) was a German portrait painter, who used an encaustic technique.

== Life ==
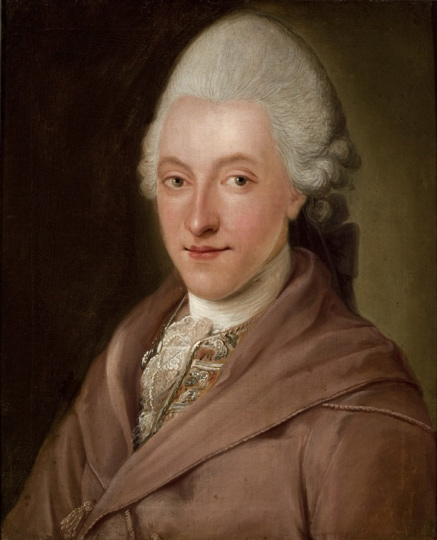
Portrait of Johann Benjamin Michaelis by Benjamin Calau, Gleimhaus, 1770

Calau was born at Friedrichstadt in Holstein in 1724, son of the painter Christoph Calau. He trained under his father, and in 1743 followed him to St Petersburg, returning to Germany in 1746. He moved to Leipzig in 1752, and was appointed court painter there four years later. His work consisted chiefly of portraits and of heads painted from his own imagination. He usually painted in dark tones, often using as his medium a form of "Carthaginian" or "Punic" wax (cire éléodorique), which he had devised in an attempt to revive an encaustic technique used in antiquity and referred to by Pliny. In 1769 he published a book on the method, entitled Ausführlicher Bericht, wie das Punische oder das Eleodorische Wachs aufzulösen.

He painted some portraits for Johann Wilhelm Ludwig Gleim's "Temple of Friendship", a collection of paintings of the poet's friends (totalling more than 120 by the time of his death) that he kept in two rooms in his home in Halberstadt.

In 1771 he went to Berlin, where the king awarded him the exclusive right to make and sell the Punic wax. It was also there that he assisted the scientist Johann Heinrich Lambert with the creation of his Farbenpyramide (colour pyramid), conceived as a practical investigation of the theoretical writings on colour of Tobias Mayer. Lambert published the results of his researches in 1772 as Beschreibung einer mit dem Calauischen Wachse ausgemalten Farbenpyramide ("Description of a colour pyramid painted with Calau's wax").

He died in Berlin in 1785.
