= Johann Georg Jacobi =

German poet (1740–1814)

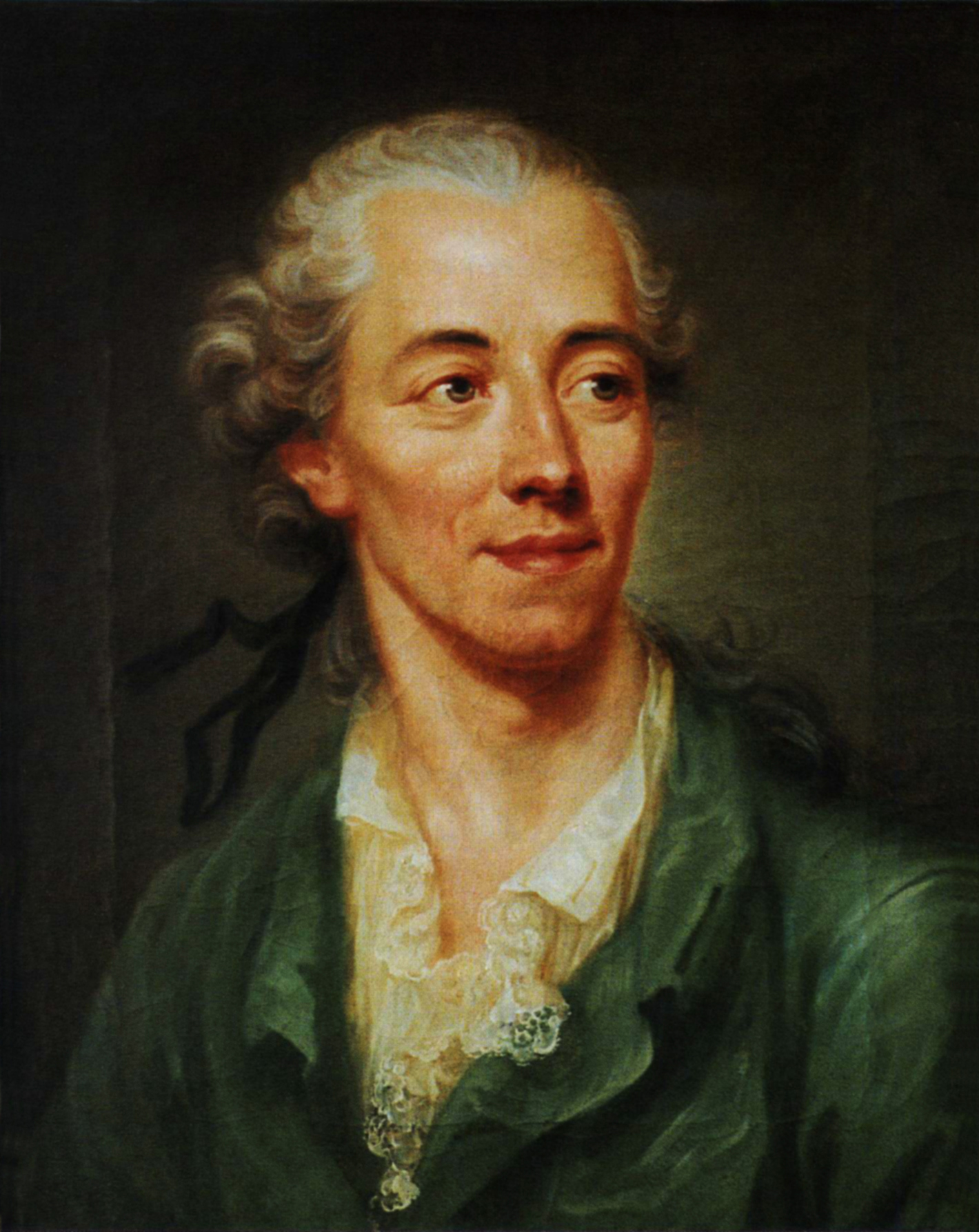
- Portrait of Jacobi by J. H. W. Tischbein
- Born: 2 September 1740; Pempelfort near Düsseldorf, Duchy of Berg
- Died: 4 January 1814 (aged 73); Freiburg im Breisgau, Grand Duchy of Baden
- Occupations: Poet, philosopher
- Relatives: Friedrich Heinrich Jacobi (brother)

Johann Georg Jacobi (/dʒəˈkoʊbi/; German: [jaˈkoːbi]; September 2, 1740 – January 4, 1814) was a German poet.

== Biography ==
The elder brother of the philosopher Friedrich Heinrich Jacobi, Johann Georg was born at Pempelfort near Düsseldorf. He studied theology at Göttingen and jurisprudence at Helmstedt, and in 1766 was appointed professor of philosophy in Halle. That year he made the acquaintance of J. W. L. Gleim, who, attracted by the young poet's Poetische Versuche (1764), became his friend. A lively literary correspondence ensued between Gleim in Halberstadt and Jacobi in Halle. In order to have Jacobi near him, Gleim succeeded in procuring for him a prebendal stall at the cathedral of Halberstadt in 1769, and here Jacobi issued a number of anacreontic lyrics and sonnets that were not at all appreciated by the intellectuals of his time. Herder called Jacobi's anacreontic poetry tasteless nonsense, Goethe criticised the jingling verses as only impressing women, and Lichtenberg ridiculed Jacobi as a doctorem jubilatum.

From 1774 to 1776, Gleim and Jacobi edited Iris, to which Goethe, Heinse, Lenz, and Sophie La Roche were contributors. In 1784, Emperor Joseph II appointed Jacobi as professor of belles lettres at the university of Freiburg, the first Protestant professor of that institution. The city's Catholic population and the teaching staff considered this a provocation, but Joseph was known for his erratic acts of forced Enlightenment.

Freiburg's educated ladies appreciated the new professor for fine arts and science particularly during afternoon tea circles. At times more female admirers than students followed his lectures at the university. In 1791 the opposition of his male Catholic colleagues eventually vanished. They elected him as the first Protestant rector of the university. This happened again in 1803 during Napoleonic domination of the Breisgau when Jacobi's excellent knowledge of French helped to overcome differences with the authorities.

Following Napoleon's defeat Freiburg and the Breisgau were not restored to the Habsburgs but remained under the rule of the Grand Duchy of Baden. To make this acceptable to the local populace, Jacobi said of the grand dukes, who were descendants of the old Zaehringen dynasty, "Now the two coat of arms during hundreds of years separated become one again and the Duke's kindness will not only unite the territories but marry the souls of the good citizens alike."

When Jacobi died in 1814, an enormous crowd of dignitaries, students and citizens attended his funeral.
