= Christian Brentano =

German writer and Catholic publicist

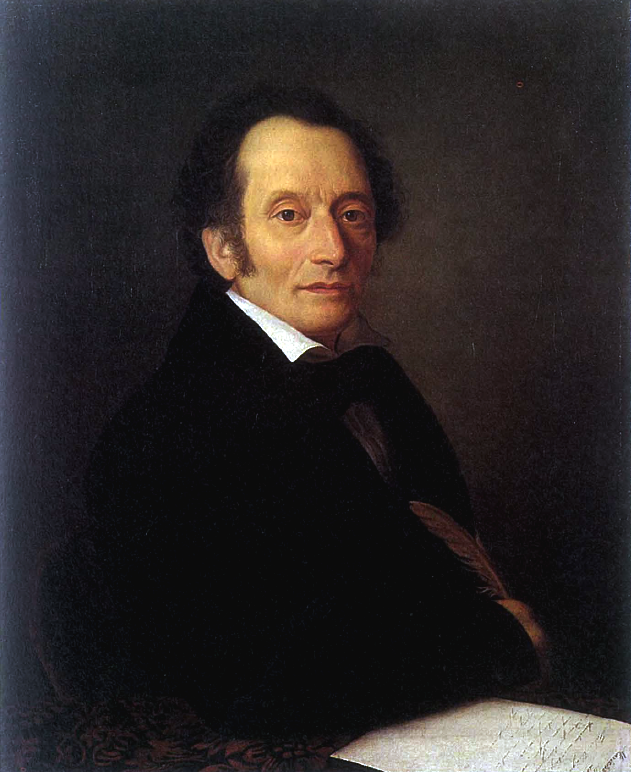
Christian Brentano

Christian Brentano (24 January 1784, Frankfurt – 27 October 1851, Frankfurt) was a German writer and Catholic publicist.

Brentano was born to Peter Anton Brentano and Maximiliane von La Roche, a wealthy merchant family in Frankfurt. His father's family was of Italian descent. His maternal grandmother was Sophie von La Roche. He was the brother of Clemens Brentano and Bettina von Arnim, famous German writers of the Romantic school, and the father of the philosopher Franz Brentano.

Brentano is noted for editing and releasing nine volumes of his brother's work in 1851–55. He survived Clemens, who actually died in 1842 while visiting Christian in Aschaffenburg.
