= Schloss Wiepersdorf =

Schloss in Brandenburg, Germany

Coordinates: 51°52′57″N 13°14′26″E

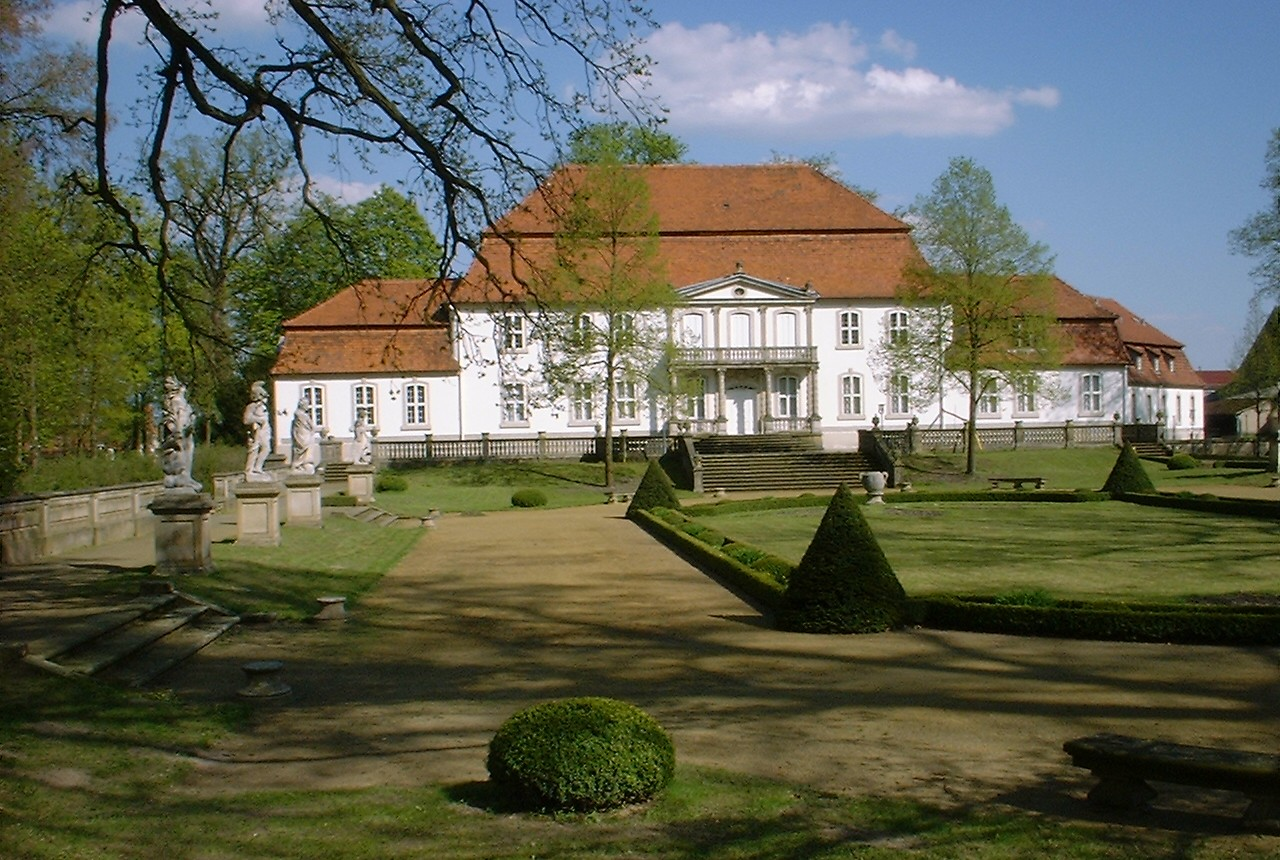

Schloss Wiepersdorf is a Schloss in Niederer Fläming, Brandenburg, Germany. It is known for being the home of the famous von Arnim family, in whose ownership the schloss remained from 1780 until 1945. After this, the house became the Künstlerhaus Schloss Wiepersdorf, a literary institute. Scholars and writers receive grants to stay in the house and complete their work amongst other scholars and writers.

The institute offers book readings, exhibitions, concerts, and other events, for the General public. It also houses a museum, commemorating the Von Arnims, and their role in Germany's literary history.
