= Friedrich Heinrich Jacobi =

German philosopher, literary figure, and socialite (1743–1819)

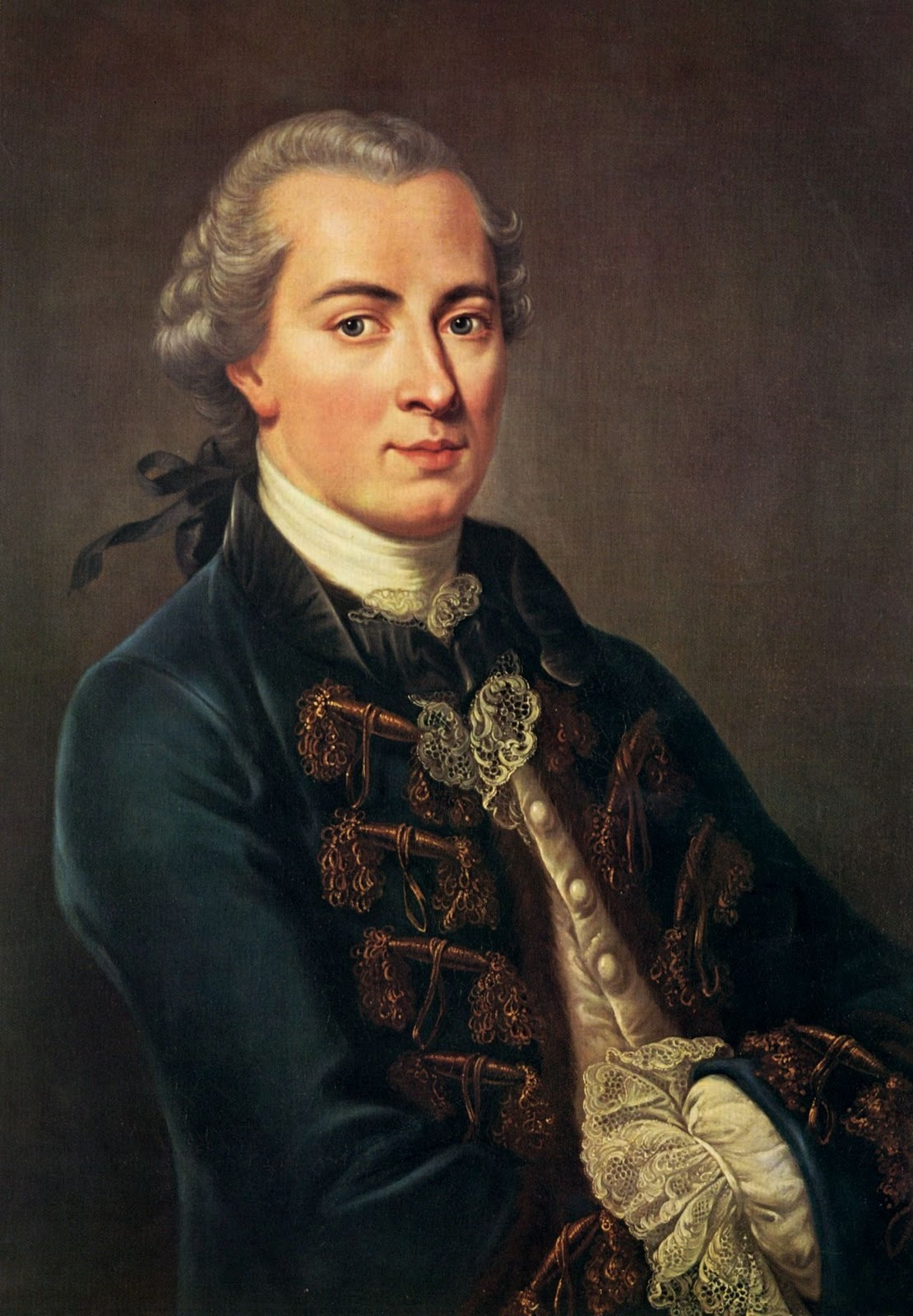
- Portrait of Jacobi, sometimes erroneously identified as portrait of Immanuel Kant
- Born: 25 January 1743; Düsseldorf, Duchy of Berg, Holy Roman Empire
- Died: 10 March 1819 (aged 76); Munich, Kingdom of Bavaria, German Confederation
- Children: Carl Wigand Maximilian Jacobi
- Relatives: Johann Georg Jacobi (brother)

Education
- Academic advisor: Georges-Louis Le Sage

Philosophical work
- Era: 19th-century philosophy
- Region: Western philosophy
- School: German idealism
- Main interests: Common sense realism, religious philosophy, metaphysics, moral philosophy
- Notable works: David Hume on Faith, or Idealism and Realism (1787)
- Notable ideas: Glaube, Offenbarung, criticism of nihilism

Friedrich Heinrich Jacobi (/dʒəˈkoʊbi/; German: [jaˈkoːbi]; 25 January 1743 – 10 March 1819) was a German philosopher, writer and socialite. He is best known for popularizing the concept of nihilism, denigrating it as the necessary result of Enlightenment thought and the philosophical systems of Baruch Spinoza, Immanuel Kant, Johann Gottlieb Fichte and Friedrich Wilhelm Joseph Schelling.

Jacobi advocated Glaube (variously translated as faith or "belief") and Offenbarung (revelation) instead of speculative reason. According to one view, Jacobi can be seen to have anticipated present-day writers who criticize secular philosophy as relativistic and dangerous for religious faith. His aloofness from the Sturm and Drang movement was the basis of a brief friendship with Johann Wolfgang von Goethe.

He was the younger brother of poet Johann Georg Jacobi and the father of the psychiatrist Maximilian Jacobi.

== Biography ==
=== Early life ===
He was born at Düsseldorf, the second son of a wealthy sugar merchant, and was educated for a commercial career, which included a brief apprenticeship at a merchant house in Frankfurt-am-Main during 1759. Following, he was sent to Geneva for general education. Jacobi, of a retiring, meditative disposition, associated himself at Geneva mainly with the literary and scientific circle (of which the most prominent member was Georges-Louis Le Sage).

He studied closely the works of Charles Bonnet, as well as the political ideas of Jean-Jacques Rousseau and Voltaire. In 1763, he was recalled to Düsseldorf, and in the following year, he married Elisabeth von Clermont and took over the management of his father's business.

After a short time, he gave up his commercial career, and in 1770, he became a member of the council for the duchies of Jülich and Berg. He distinguished himself by his ability in financial affairs and his zeal in social reform. Jacobi kept up his interest in literary and philosophical matters through an extensive correspondence. His mansion at Pempelfort, near Düsseldorf, was the centre of a distinguished literary circle. He helped to found a new literary journal with Christoph Martin Wieland. Some of his earliest writings, mainly on practical or economic subjects, were published in Der Teutsche Merkur.

Here too appeared in part the first of his philosophical works, Edward Allwill's Briefsammlung (1776), a combination of romance and speculation. This was followed in 1779 by Woldemar, a philosophical novel, of very imperfect structure, but full of genial ideas, and giving the most complete picture of Jacobi's method of philosophizing.

In 1779, he visited Munich following his appointment as minister and privy councillor for the Bavarian department of customs and commerce. He opposed the mercantilistic policies of Bavaria and intended to liberalize local customs and taxes; but, after a short stay there, differences with his colleagues and with the authorities of Bavaria, as well as his unwillingness to engage in a power struggle, drove him back to Pempelfort. The experience as well as its aftermath led to the publication of two essays in which Jacobi defended Adam Smith's theories of political economy. These essays were followed in 1785 by the work which first brought Jacobi into prominence as a philosopher.

=== Pantheism controversy ===
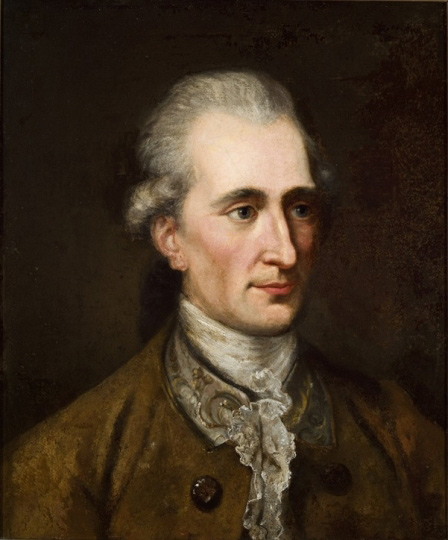
Jacobi painting by Johann Friedrich Eich, 1780

A conversation with Gotthold Lessing in 1780 in which Lessing avowed that he knew no philosophy in the true sense of that word, save Spinozism, led him to a protracted study of Spinoza's works. After Lessing's death, just a couple of months later, Jacobi continued to engage with Spinozism in an exchange of letters with Lessing's close friend Moses Mendelssohn, which began in 1783. These letters, published with commentary by Jacobi as Briefe über die Lehre Spinozas (1785; 2nd ed., much enlarged and with important Appendices, 1789), expressed sharply and clearly Jacobi's strenuous objection to a dogmatic system in philosophy, and drew upon him the vigorous enmity of the Aufklärer.

Jacobi was ridiculed for trying to reintroduce into philosophy the antiquated notion of unreasoning belief, was denounced as an enemy of reason, as a pietist, and as a Jesuit in disguise, and was especially attacked for his use of the ambiguous term "belief". His next important work, David Hume on Faith, or Idealism and Realism (David Hume über den Glauben oder Idealismus und Realismus, 1787), was an attempt to show not only that the term Glaube had been used by the most eminent writers to denote what he had employed it for in the Letters on Spinoza, but that the nature of the cognition of facts as opposed to the construction of inferences could not be otherwise expressed. In this writing, and especially in the Appendix, Jacobi came into contact with the critical philosophy and subjected the Kantian view of knowledge to searching examination. Jacobi addressed in the said Appendix Kant's concept of "thing-in-itself." Jacobi agreed that the objective thing-in-itself cannot be directly known. However, he stated, it must be taken on faith. A subject must believe that there is a real object in the external world that is related to the representation or mental idea that is directly known. This faith or belief is a result of revelation or immediately known, but logically unproven, truth. The real existence of a thing-in-itself is revealed or disclosed to the observing subject. In this way, the subject directly knows the ideal, subjective representations that appear in the mind, and strongly believes in the real, objective thing-in-itself that exists outside of the mind. By presenting the external world as an object of faith, Jacobi legitimized belief and its theological associations. Schopenhauer would later state: "…[B]y reducing the external world to a matter of faith, he wanted merely to open a little door for faith in general…."

Ironically, the pantheism controversy led later German philosophers and writers to take an interest in pantheism and Spinozism. Jacobi's fideism remained unpopular, and instead his critique of Enlightenment rationalism led more German philosophers to explore atheism and wrestle with the perceived loss of philosophical foundations for theism, myth, and morality. Jacobi and the pantheism controversy he ignited remain important in European intellectual history, because he formulated (albeit critically) one of the first systematic statements of nihilism and represents an early example of the death of God discourse.

=== Later life ===
The Pempelfort era came to an end in 1794 when the French Revolution spilled over into Germany following the outbreak of war with the French Republic. The occupation of Düsseldorf by French troops forced him to resettle and, for nearly ten years, live in Holstein. There he became intimately acquainted with Karl Leonhard Reinhold (in whose Beyträge zur leichtern Uebersicht des Zustandes der Philosophie beym Anfange des 19. Jahrhunderts Jacobi's important work, "Ueber das Unternehmen des Kriticismus, die Vernunft zu Verstande zu bringen", was first published), and with Matthias Claudius, the editor of the Wandsbecker Bote.

==== Atheism dispute ====
Gottlieb Fichte was dismissed from Jena in 1799 as a result of a charge of atheism. He was accused of this in 1798, after publishing his essay "Ueber den Grund unsers Glaubens an eine göttliche Weltregierung" ("On the Ground of Our Belief in a Divine World-Governance"), which he had written in response to Friedrich Karl Forberg's essay "Development of the Concept of Religion", in his Philosophical Journal. For Fichte, God should be conceived primarily in moral terms: "The living and efficaciously acting moral order is itself God. We require no other God, nor can we grasp any other" ("On the Ground of Our Belief in a Divine World-Governance"). Fichte's intemperate "Appeal to the Public" ("Appellation an das Publikum", 1799) as well as a more thoughtful response entitled “From a Private Letter” (1799), provoked F. H. Jacobi to publish Letter to Fichte (1799), in which he equated philosophy in general and Fichte's transcendental philosophy in particular with nihilism and the relation of his own philosophical principles to theology.

==== President of Bavarian Academy of Sciences and retirement ====
Soon after his return to Germany, Jacobi received a call to Munich in connection with the new academy of sciences just founded there. The loss of a considerable portion of his fortune induced him to accept this offer; he settled in Munich in 1804 and in 1807 became president of the academy.

In 1811, his last philosophical work appeared, directed against Friedrich Schelling especially (Von den göttlichen Dingen und ihrer Offenbarung), the first part of which, a review of the Wandsbecker Bote, had been written in 1798. A bitter reply from Schelling was left without answer by Jacobi, but gave rise to an animated controversy in which Fries and Baader took prominent part.

In 1812, Jacobi retired from the office of president and began to prepare a collected edition of his works. He died before this was completed. The edition of his writings was continued by his friend F. Koppen, and was completed in 1825. The works fill six volumes, of which the fourth is in three parts. To the second is prefixed an introduction by Jacobi, which is at the same time an introduction to his philosophy. The fourth volume also has an important preface.

== Influence on his contemporaries ==
=== Controversy with Schelling ===
Jacobi and Schelling knew each other before the controversy. After being appointed as the president of the Bavarian Academy of Sciences (Bayerische Akademie der Wissenschaften), Jacobi worked along with Schelling as colleagues. As illustrated above, a great portion of Jacobi's work focused on opposing the Spinozist pantheism as well as fatalism. From Jacobi's perspective, Schelling, his colleague as well as one of the most influential philosophers at that time, matches his criteria of pantheism perfectly. Jacobi holds a viewpoint that the Naturphilosophie of Schelling is essentially a philosophy without the transcendental realm: everything emerges from a unconditional nature (natura naturans), which leads to a conclusion that God is nature that is graspable by human reason, while not the "total other" in Christian traditions; in the meantime, the realm of faith, which is the central conception that Jacobi intended to restore, is faded in Schelling's rationalism. Jacobi consequently published On the Divine Things (Von den göttlichen Dingen) in 1811, initiated the controversy towards Schelling. In this treatise, Jacobi condemns Schelling because he eliminates the freedom of God by integrating God into nature, whilst nature is a "whole" (Ganzes) that is manipulated by logical necessity or causality. According to the Christian tradition, God ought to be totally independent of all necessity. As for himself, Jacobi insists that the freedom of God manifests itself when God is acting as an ultimate cause, which operates free action (handlung), instead of being framed in logical necessity (nature, in this context).

Correspondingly, Schelling responded to Jacobi with his last publication Denkmal in next year. The way Schelling defended himself is to re-emphasise his idea in his 1809 Philosophical Inquiries into the Essence of Human Freedom (Freiheitschrift). According to Schelling, the relationship between God and nature must be taken into account in philosophy, or it will leave "an unnatural God and a godless nature". In other words, Schelling's reaction based on this viewpoint: freedom does not expel necessity but contains it. Schelling holds a quite Kantian position, claiming that freedom implies self-determination, not merely actions. Therefore, freedom does not present itself in actions, but in the obedience to certain rules that are not imposed from outside, but from within. To Schelling, since these rules emerge without the interference from outside, this is an indication of nature's self-determination, namely, freedom; additionally, it is this self-determination that made the freedom of actions emphasized by Jacobi possible. In other words, in Schelling's discourse, freedom and necessity do not essentially expel each other; rather, freedom and necessity are ultimately one.

Jacobi responded to Schelling's self-defense in 1815; however, they did not reach any immediate result, because Jacobi died a few years later. Nonetheless, Schelling moved on to the construction of his late philosophy of revelation and mythology, whereas reflected his early system and reconsidered the value of Jacobi's thought--in his 1833 lectures on modern philosophy, and recognized him as a pioneer of the "positive philosophy". As Schelling notes,

As such he [Jacobi] is perhaps the most instructive personality in the whole history of modern philosophy.

— Friedrich Schelling, Jacobi and Theosophy, On the History of Modern Philosophy

=== Influences on Fichte's 1794 Wissenschaftslehre ===
Although J. G. Fichte never directly mentioned Jacobi's name or cited his work in 1794 version of Wissenschaftslehre, according to Wood, Fichte's work in fact explicitly expresses some proximity to Jacobi's thought. In Jacobi's 1785 work On the teachings of Spinoza in letters to Moses Mendelssohn (Über die Lehre des Spinoza in Briefen an den Herrn Moses Mendelssohn), he declared

Denn wir empfinden doch nur unseren Körper, so oder anders beschaffen; und indem wir ihn so oder anders beschaffen fühlen, werden wir nicht allein seine Veränderungen, sondern noch etwas davon ganz verschiedenes, das weder bloß Empfindung noch Gedanke ist, andre würkliche Dinge gewahr, und zwar mit | eben der Gewißheit, mit der wir uns selbst gewahr werden; denn ohne Du, ist das Ich unmöglich.

For we only feel our body, one way or another; and by feeling it is created in one way or another, we will not only perceive its changes, but something quite different from it, which is neither mere sensation nor thought, aware of other things, and with the very certainty with which we become self-aware; for without Thou, the I is impossible.

— Friedrich Jacobi, Über die Lehre des Spinoza

Here the structure we observed from Jacobi's text could be summarized as follows: we as beings who possess "I", only manifest the "I" (namely, selfhood) when encounters Thou, that is, the "other" surrounds us. Only when we encounter something other than ourselves, our sense of "self" is confirmed. Hence, we may perceive a nexus and mutual dependency between I and Thou: I always come first, and then Thou confirms the existence of it.

This pair of reflective determinations echoes Fichte's work. In his 1794 Foundations of Science of Knowledge (Grundlage der gesamten Wissenschaftslehre), Fichte adopted a methodology that he called "synthetic method". In the context of Foundations, it presents itself in a mode of "thesis–antithesis–synthesis": "I" is absolutely posited at first, and then "Not-I" is posited as the antithesis of the former. Nevertheless, this process would be incomplete if it lacked the final step of synthesis. The synthesis method guarantees the relations between I and Not-I. In Fichtean discourse, this may possibly contain interpersonal relationships. Here we could tell the similarity between Jacobi and Fichte: "Thou", as in Jacobi's work, is basically replaced by "Not-I" in Fichte's work. Even though Fichte never showed his source of ideas, in a letter from him to Jacobi in April 1796, he expressed his appreciation of the alignment between him and Jacobi. This could be seen as evidence that Fichte's theory is inspired by Jacobi to a great extent.

Jacobi's influence on Fichte is more explicit and openly admitted by Fichte himself on the topic of certainty and faith. Still, in Jacobi's Spinoza text, he wrote:

Wie können wir nach Gewißheit streben, wenn uns Gewißheit nicht zum voraus schon bekannt ist; und wie kann sie uns bekannt sein, anders als durch etwas das wir mit Gewißheit schon erkennen? Dieses führt zu dem Begriffe einer unmittelbaren Gewißheit, welche nicht allein keiner Gründe bedarf, sondern schlechterdings alle Gründe ausschließt, und einzig und allein die mit dem vorgestellten Dinge übereinstimmende Vorstellung selbst ist.

How can we strive for certainty if certainty is not already known to us in advance, and how can it be known to us other than through something we already know with certainty? This leads to the concept of an immediate certainty, which not only requires no reasons, but simply excludes all reasons, and is the only idea itself that agrees with the thing presented.

— Friedrich Jacobi, Über die Lehre des Spinoza

To Jacobi, the concept he chose to put in the position of unconditional certainty is God. By means of this presupposition, Jacobi leaves room for faith in his philosophy, whereas this element already dissolved in reason in many preceding philosophers. This move prevents, at least from Jacobi's point of view back in time, the ontological infinite regress. Fichte adopted the same strategy as well. In §1 of the Foundations, Fichte stated:

...[H]uman beings must possess some truth that neither can nor needs to be proven and from which all other truths can be derived. If not, then there is no truth at all, and we are driven into an infinite regress.

— J. G. Fichte, Foundations of Transcendental Philosophy

As we shall tell from the use of certain terms, Fichte addressed the same topic as Jacobi. Furthermore, this proximity in ways of searching for unconditional ontological foundation was directly acknowledged by Fichte:

Auch darüber hätten sie sich bei ]acobi belehren können, welcher diesen Punkt, sowie noch viele andere Punkte, von denen sie gleichfalls nichts wissen, völlig ins reine gebracht. They could also have learned about this at Jacobi, which brought this point, as well as many other points, of which they also know nothing, completely in the clear.

— J. G. Fichte, Zweite Einleitung in die Wissenschaftslehre, Versuch einer neuen Darstellung der Wissenschaftslehre (1797/98)

== Philosophical work ==
Jacobi's philosophy is essentially unsystematic. A fundamental view which underlies all his thinking is brought to bear in succession upon those systematic doctrines which appear to stand most sharply in contradiction to it, and any positive philosophical results are given only occasionally. The leading idea of the whole is that of the complete separation between understanding [comprehension] and apprehension of real fact. For Jacobi, Understanding, or the logical faculty, is purely formal or elaborative, and its results never transcend the given material supplied to it. From the basis of immediate experience or perception, thought proceeds by comparison and abstraction, establishing connections among facts, but remaining in its nature mediate and finite.

The principle of reason and consequent, the necessity of thinking each given fact of perception as conditioned, impels understanding towards an endless series of identical propositions, the records of successive comparisons and abstractions. The province of the understanding is therefore strictly the region of the conditioned; to it the world must present itself as a mechanism. If, then, there is objective truth at all, the existence of real facts must be made known to us otherwise than through the logical faculty of thought; and, as the regress from conclusion to premises must depend upon something not itself capable of logical grounding, mediate thought implies the consciousness of immediate truth.

Thus, for the scientific understanding, there can be no God and no liberty. It is impossible that there should be a God, for if so, he would of necessity be finite. But a finite God, a God that is known, is no God. It is impossible that there should be liberty, for if so, the mechanical order of phenomena, by means of which they are comprehensible, would be disturbed, and we should have an unintelligible world, coupled with the requirement that it shall be understood. Cognition, then, in the strict sense, occupies the middle place between sense perception, which is belief in matters of sense, and reason, which is belief in supersensuous fact.

== Reception ==
According to Stefan Schick, Jacobi was always "defamed as an apologist of religious faith and an enemy of reason" in both the 19th and 20th centuries. It was not until the 1990s and 2000s that the work of scholars such as Dieter Henrich, and especially Birgit Sandkaulen in her book Grund und Ursache (2000) revitalized the systematic reading of Jacobi for the first time. Moreover, influential works such as Frederick Beiser's Fate of Reason (1987) still portray Jacobi as an anti-enlightenment, religious thinker.

== Works ==
- Early essays in Der Teutsche Merkur. Available online.
- Edward Allwill’s Briefsammlung (1781).
- Etwas das Lessing gesagt hat (1782). Werke, vol. 2, pp. 325-388.
- Über die Lehre des Spinoza in Briefen an den Herrn Moses Mendelssohn (1785). 2nd edition, 1789. NYPL.
- Friedrich Heinrich Jacobi wider Mendelssohns Beschuldigungen betreffend die Briefe über die Lehre des Spinoza (1786). Oxford.
- David Hume über den Glauben oder Idealismus und Realismus (1787). University of Lausanne.
- Woldemar (1794). 2 volumes. Oxford. 2nd edition, 1796. NYPL.
- Jacobi an Fichte (1799/1816). University of Michigan. Italian translation, 3 Appendices with Jacobi's and Fichte's complementary Texts, Commentary by A. Acerbi: La Scuola di Pitagora, Naples 2017, ISBN 978-88-6542-553-4.
- Ueber das Unternehmen des Kriticismus (1801). Werke, vol. 3, pp. 59-195.
- Ueber Gelehrte Gesellschaften, ihren Geist und Zweck (1807). Harvard.
- Von den göttlichen Dingen und ihrer Offenbarung (1811). University of California.
- Friedrich Heinrich Jacobi's Werke (1812–1825).
  - Volume 1, 1812. Harvard; NYPL; University of Michigan; University of Michigan (Morris).
  - Volume 2, 1815. Harvard; NYPL; University of Michigan; University of Michigan (Morris).
  - Volume 3, 1816. Harvard; NYPL; University of Michigan; University of Michigan (Morris).
  - Volume 4, 1819. Harvard. Parts 1 & 2: Oxford; University of Michigan (Morris).
    - Part 1. NYPL; University of Michigan.
    - Part 2. NYPL; University of Michigan.
    - Part 3. NYPL; University of Michigan (Morris).
  - Volume 5, 1820. Harvard; NYPL; University of Michigan; University of Michigan (Morris).
  - Volume 6, 1825. NYPL; University of Michigan (Morris).
- Friedrich Heinrich Jacobi's auserlesener Briefwechsel (1825–27). 2 volumes.
  - Volume 1, 1825. Harvard; University of Michigan.
  - Volume 2, 1827. Harvard; University of Michigan.

=== Historical-critical editions ===
- Jacobi, Friedrich Heinrich. Werke. Gesamtausgabe. Edited by Klaus Hammacher and Walter Jaeschke. Hamburg: Meiner, 1998 ff. 7 volumes.
- Jacobi, Friedrich Heinrich. Briefwechsel. Gesamtausgabe. Stuttgart-Bad Cannstatt: Frommann-Holzboog, 1981 ff. 15 volumes.

== See also ==
- Salomon Maimon
- Gottlob Ernst Schulze
