= Johann Jakob Wilhelm Heinse =

German writer (1746–1803)

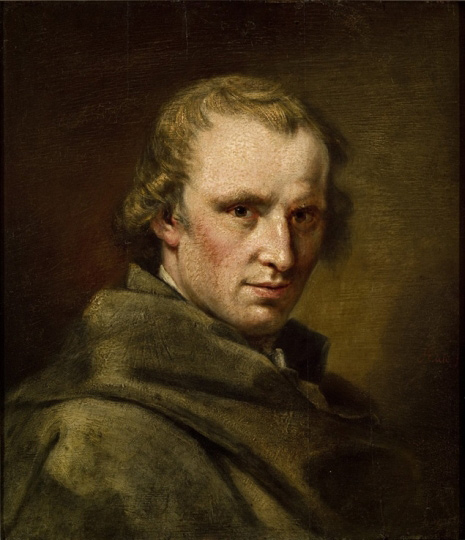
Portrait by Johann Friedrich Eich, 1779

Johann Jakob Wilhelm Heinse (16 February 1746 – 22 June 1803) was a German author. He was born at Langewiesen in Schwarzburg-Sondershausen (now in Thuringia).

After attending grammar school at Schleusingen he studied law at Jena and Erfurt. In Erfurt he became acquainted with Christoph Martin Wieland and through him with "Father" Gleim who in 1772 procured him the post of tutor in a family at Quedlinburg.

In 1774, he went to Düsseldorf, where he assisted the poet Johann Georg Jacobi in editing the periodical Iris. Here the famous picture gallery inspired him with a passion for art, to the study of which he devoted himself with so much zeal and insight that Jacobi furnished him with funds for a stay in Italy, where he remained for three years (1780–1783).

He returned to Düsseldorf in 1784, and in 1786 was appointed reader to the elector Frederick Charles Joseph, archbishop of Mainz, who subsequently made him his librarian at Aschaffenburg, where he died.

Heinse is mainly famous for his novel Ardinghello und die glückseligen Inseln (1787), in which he expresses his views on art and life, the plot being laid in the Italy of the 16th century. This and his other novels Laidion, oder die eleusinischen Geheimnisse (1774) and Hildegard von Hohenthal (1796) combine the frank voluptuousness of Wieland with the enthusiasm of the Sturm und Drang. Both as novelist and art critic, Heinse had considerable influence on the Romantic school.

== Works ==
- Sinngedichte (1771)
- Die Kirschen (1773)
- Laidion, oder die eleusinischen Geheimnisse (1774)
- Ardinghello und die glückseligen Inseln (1787)
- Hildegard von Hohenthal (1796)
- Anastasia und das Schachspiel (1803)

=== Translations ===
- Begebenheiten des Enkolp, aus dem Satirikon des Petronius (1773)
- Das befreite Jerusalem von Torquato Tasso (in prose, 1781)
- Roland der Wüthende, ein Heldengedicht von Ludwig Ariost dem Göttlichen (in prose, 1782)
- Anastasia and the game of chess (2026)

=== Editions ===
Heinse's complete works (Sämtliche Schriften) were published by Heinrich Laube in 10 volumes (Leipzig, 1838). A newer version edited by Carl Schüddekopf is in 13 volumes (Leipzig, 1903–1925).

== Literature ==
- Heinrich Pröhle, Lessing, Wieland, Heinse (Liebel, Berlin, 1877)
- Johann Schober, Johann Jacob Wilhelm Heinse, sein Leben and seine Werk (Wilhelm Friedrich, Leipzig, 1882)
- Karl Detlev Jessen, Heinses Stellung zur bildenden Kunst (Mayer & Müller, Berlin, 1903).
- Manfred Dick, Der junge Heinse in seiner Zeit (Wilhelm Fink, München, 1980)
- Rita Terras, "Wilhelm Heinse", in James Hardin & Christoph E Schweitzer (eds.), Dictionary of Literary Biography, vol. 94: German Writers in the Age of Goethe: Sturm und Drang to Classicism, ISBN 0810345749, pp. 67–71
- Charis Goer, Ungleiche Geschwister. Literatur und die Künste bei Wilhelm Heinse (Wilhelm Fink, München 2006).
