= Wyttenbach =

Swiss German surname

Wyttenbach or von Wyttenbach is a Swiss German surname and the name of a Swiss noble family.

== Notable people ==
- Daniel Albert Wyttenbach (1746–1820), Swiss scholar
- Ethan Wyttenbach (born 2007), American ice hockey player
- Jeanne Wyttenbach (1773–1830), Dutch philosopher and novelist
- Johann Hugo Wyttenbach (1767–1848), German librarian, historian, and schoolmaster
- Jürg Wyttenbach (1935–2021), Swiss composer, pianist, and conductor
- Thomas Wyttenbach (c.1472–1526), Swiss Protestant reformer and theologian
