= Grasmück =

Grasmück is a German surname. Notable people with the surname include:

- Günter Grasmück (fl. 1973–2021), Austrian musician
- Jürgen Grasmück (1940–2007), German writer
