= Großauheim =

- Stadtteil of Hanau
- Coat of arms
- Interactive map of Großauheim
- Location within Germany Location within Hesse
- Coordinates: 50°06′N 8°57′E
- Country: Germany
- State: Hesse
- Admin. region: Darmstadt
- District: Main-Kinzig-Kreis
- Town: Hanau

Population (2021)
  - Total: 13,129
- Time zone: UTC+01:00 (CET)
  - Summer (DST): UTC+02:00 (CEST)

Großauheim (13,369 inhabitants, without Wolfgang 11,669) is the largest district of Hanau, Hesse, Germany, on the north bank of the Main. It was first mentioned in 806 under the name "Ewichheim". It was a farming village until the end of the 19th century but during the 20th century, numerous branches of industry settled there. The Hanau Port built in 1924 is mainly in Großauheim. In 1956, Großauheim was made a free town. In 1972, Großauheim included Wolfgang but due to the Hessian regional reform, Großauheim and Wolfgang were incorporated into Hanau in July 1974. In the 1970s, the industry began to migrate and it has almost vanished today. It was the site of multiple American military bases until 2008.

A well-known "Auheim Child" is the famous German sculptor August Gaul.

In honor of Saint Rochus, who was beseeched for relieving the town from pestilence, a yearly procession is done to a central place "Rochusplatz" in the town, where a memorial of the Saint Rochus stands today. The Rochusmarkt ("Rochus market") takes place every year in September in the town center of Großauheim.

Conflans-Sainte-Honorine, near Paris on the river Seine, is Großauheim's twin town.
