= Johann Christian Claudius Devaranne =

Johann Christian Claudius Devaranne (March 8, 1784 – July 20, 1813) was one of the leaders of an insurgency directed against Napoleon I of France's military occupation of Solingen in Germany's North Rhine-Westphalia. Up through the time of his involvement with the insurgency, Devaranne operated an inn and hardware store in Solingen's Wald district.

Napoléon's losses, resulting from the French invasion of Russia, prompted him to conscript replacements from the populations under his control. Among these were the citizenry of Solingen. Napoléon's draft announcement quickly generated resistance. On learning of the resistance, Napoléon dispatched troops to suppress it. Devaranne was identified as one of the leaders and a warrant was issued for his arrest.

Devaranne's housemaid turned him in to the French for a 100 Franc reward. When Devaranne returned to his home, French soldiers were waiting to arrest him. He was tried with other resistance leaders and executed by firing squad in Düsseldorf.

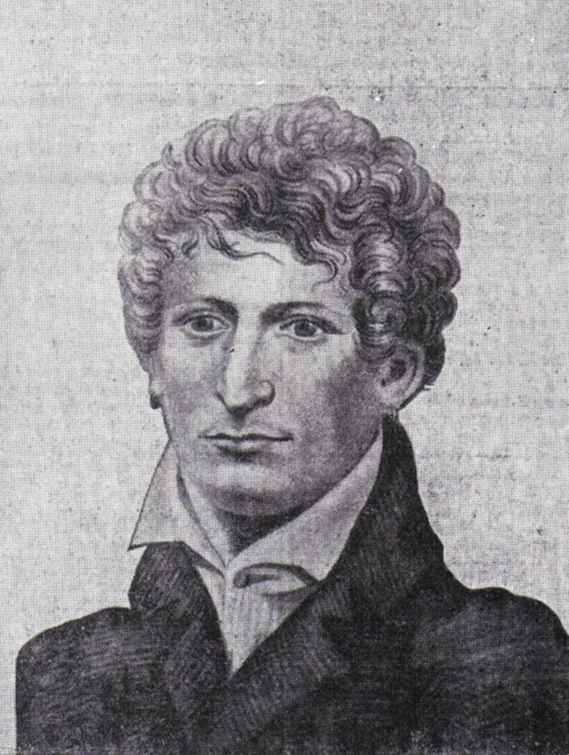
A portrait of J. C. C. Devaranne

== Life ==
J. C. C. Devaranne was born in Hanau, Germany to Peter Devaranne (April 2, 1761 – November 18, 1824) and Elisabeth Jost (April 1759 – January 2, 1813). He was most likely their eldest child, because he was born almost exactly one year after his parents' March 10, 1783 marriage. He had three known siblings: Marianne Karoline Devaranne (June 14, 1788 – ), Christian Heinrich Devaranne (1790 – October 25, 1813), and Johanna Elisabeth Devaranne (April 6, 1794 – June 16, 1869). His father was a locksmith.

The Devaranne family probably left France during the time of the Huguenot pogroms and the Walloon Congregation in Hanau took them in. The Walloon Congregation was founded by reformed emigrants, who settled in Hanau in the year 1594.

It is not known when Devaranne moved to Solingen's Wald district, however an invoice survives that he delivered himself and signed as a receipt. It can be inferred from the date on the invoice that he already had a hardware business in Wald before December 1, 1806. Devaranne was 22 years old at this time.

He married Catharina Margaretha Friederika Hager on March 9, 1805. They were the parents of Auguste Emilie (February 2, 1806 – ?), Eduard Julius, Wilhemine Theadora (August 25, 1807 – ?), Albertine Juliane (February 23, 1810 – ?), and Henrietta Augusta (October 6, 1811 – July 29, 1817).

== Heroic mythology creation ==
On July 23, 1933, the City of Solingen dedicated a memorial plaque commemorating the 120th anniversary of J. C. C. Devaranne's execution. Devaranne had become a hero of the Nazi regime in Solingen. In local newspaper reports of the event, he was repeatedly compared with other Nazi heroes like Albert Leo Schlageter, Horst Wessel and Shill's Officers. The memorial plaque disappeared after the end of the Second World War. Its whereabouts are unknown.

At some point, a street near the center of Solingen's Wald district was named in honor of Devaranne. The street bears his name to this day.

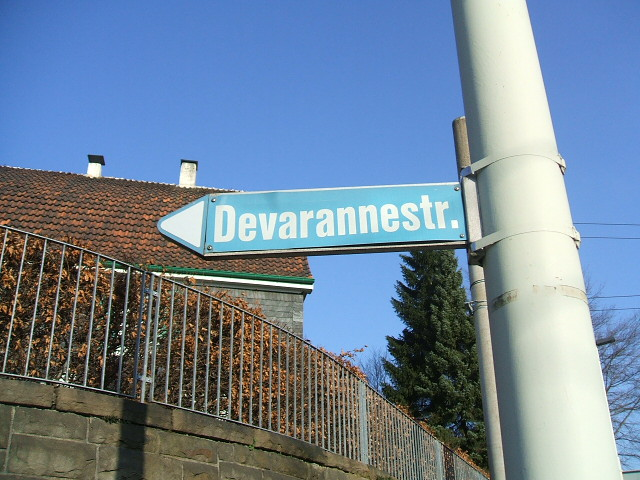
Street sign on the street in Solingen-Wald named for J. C. C. Devaranne
