= Hanau =

City in Hesse, Germany

- City
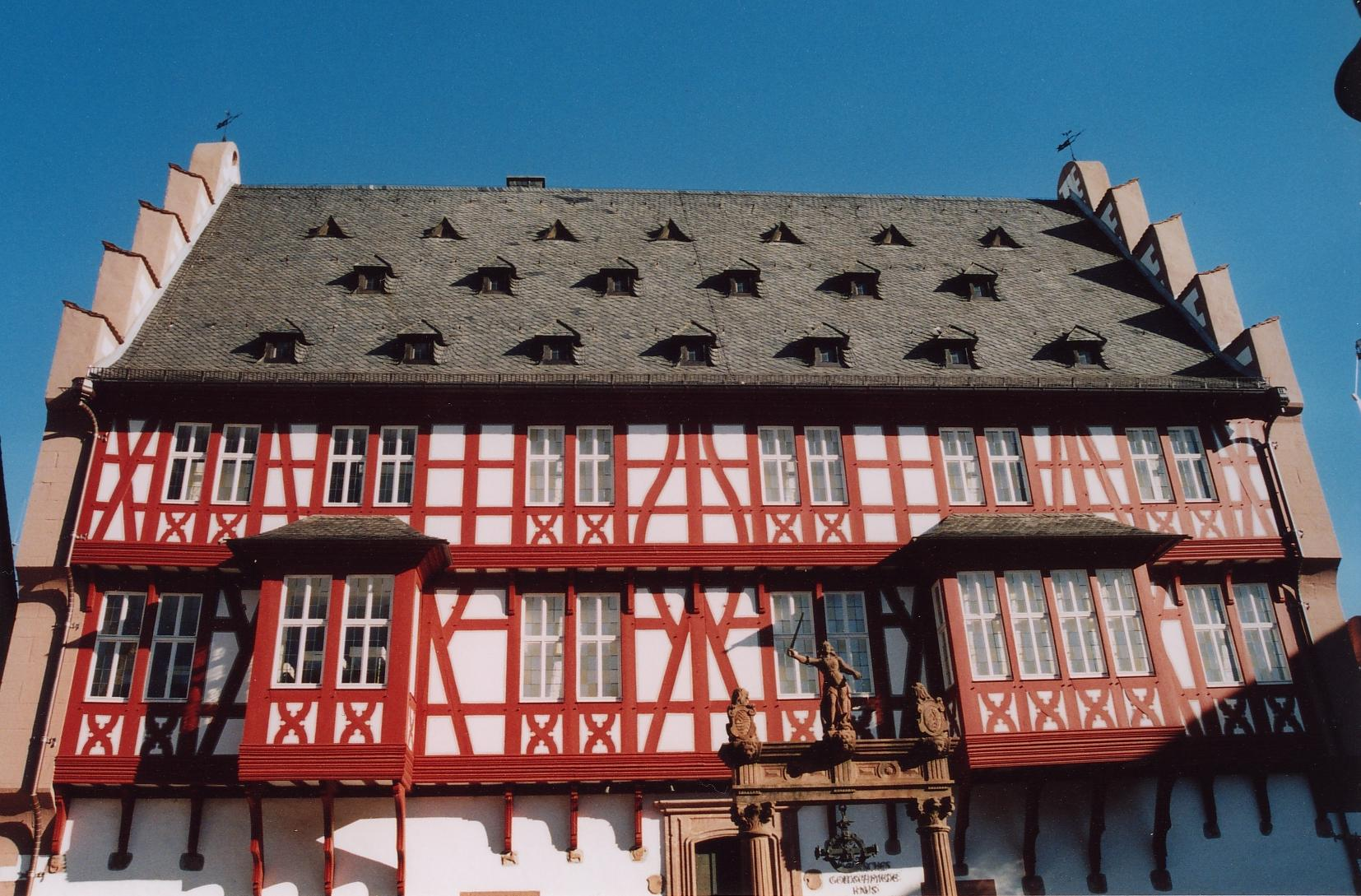
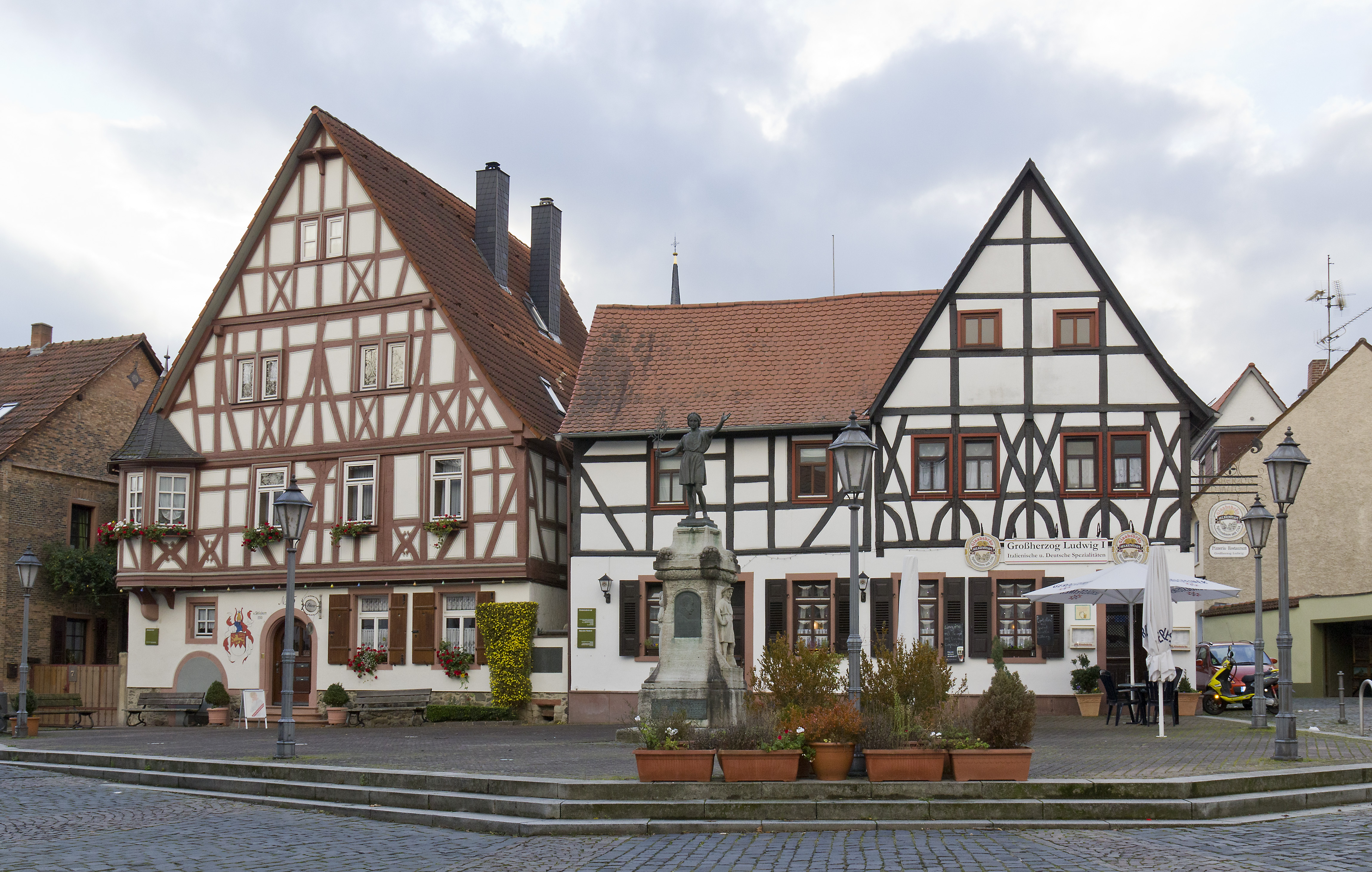
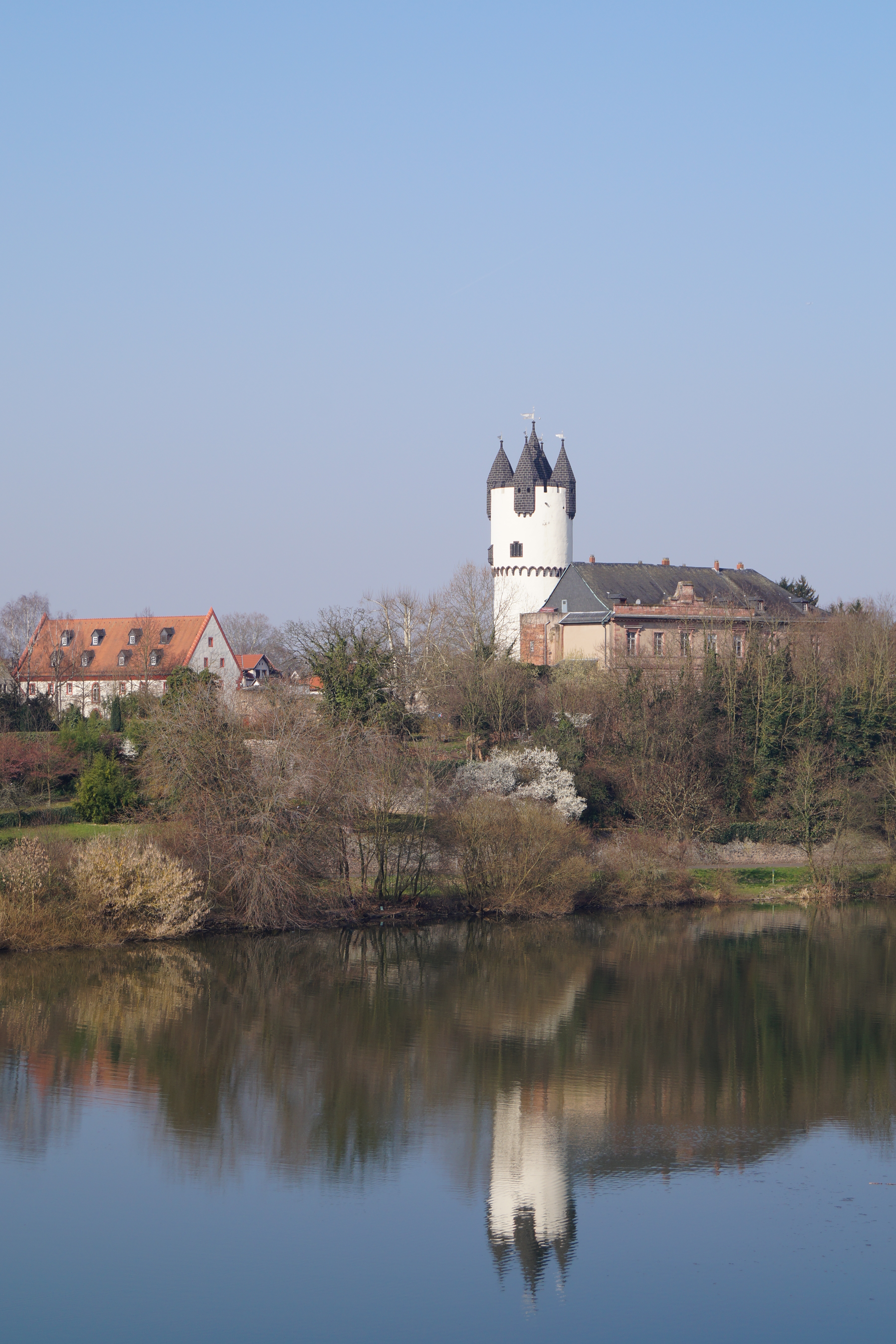
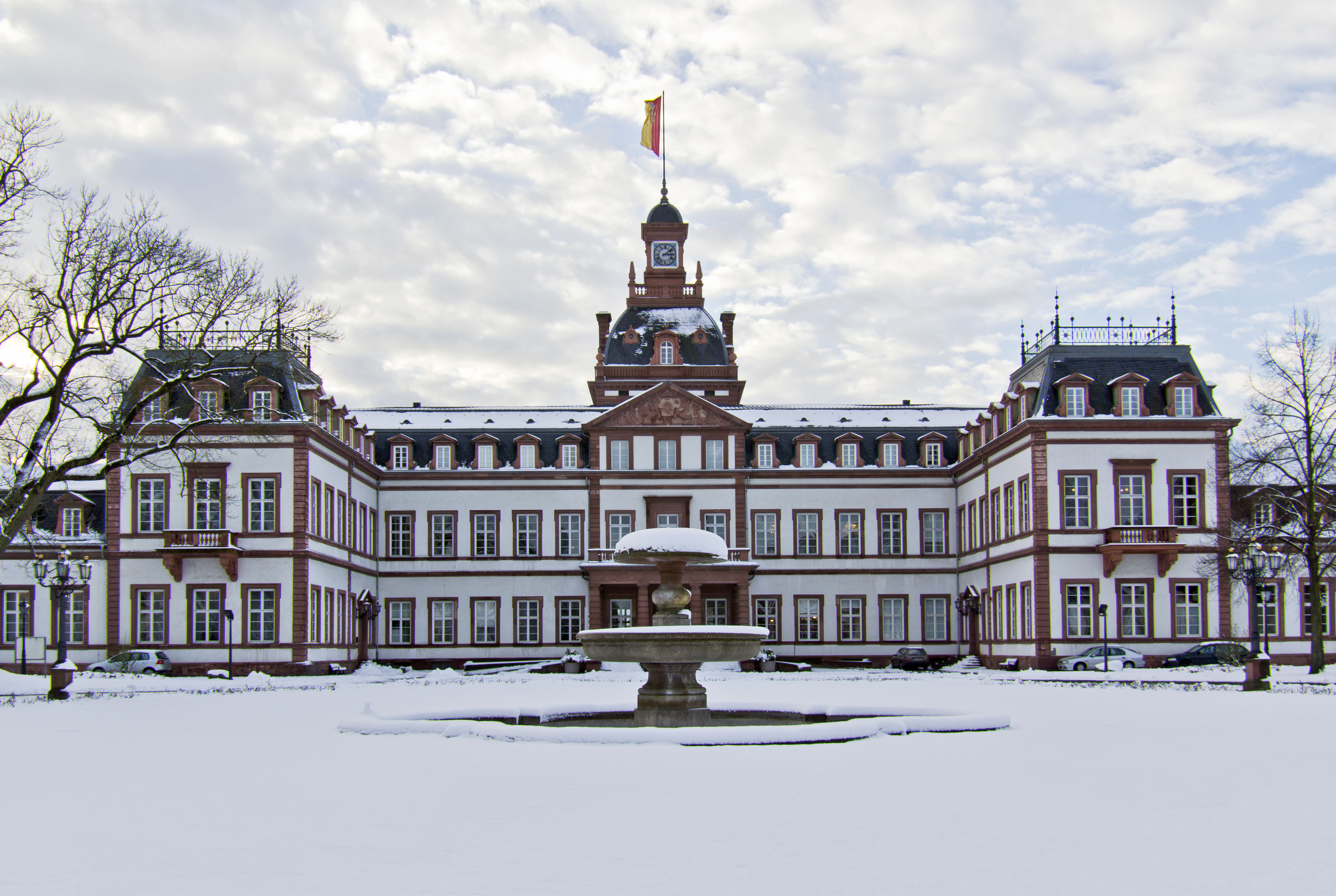
- Goldsmiths' House (Hanau old town hall) Hanau-Steinheim old town Schloss Steinheim Schloss Philippsruhe

- Flag Coat of arms

- Location of Hanau within Hessen
- Interactive map of Hanau
- Location within Germany Location within Hesse
- Coordinates: 50°07′58″N 08°55′01″E
- Country: Germany
- State: Hesse
- Admin. region: Darmstadt
- District: Urban district

Government
  - Mayor (2021–27): Claus Kaminsky (SPD)

Area
  - Total: 76.47 km^{2} (29.53 sq mi)
- Elevation: 104 m (341 ft)

Population (2025-12-31)
  - Total: 98,582
  - Density: 1,289/km^{2} (3,339/sq mi)
- Time zone: UTC+01:00 (CET)
  - Summer (DST): UTC+02:00 (CEST)
- Postal codes: 63450, 63452, 63454 63456, 63457
- Dialling codes: 06181
- Vehicle registration: HU
- Website: www.hanau.de

Hanau (German pronunciation: [ˈhaːnaʊ]) is a city in Hesse, Germany. It is 25 km east of Frankfurt am Main and part of the Frankfurt Rhine-Main Metropolitan Region. Its railway station is a major junction and it has a port on the river Main, making it an important transport centre. The city is known for being the birthplace of Jakob and Wilhelm Grimm and Franciscus Sylvius. Since the 16th century it was a centre of precious metal working, with many goldsmiths. It is home to Heraeus, one of Germany's largest family-owned companies. With more than 96,756 residents, it was the largest city in the Main-Kinzig-Kreis before becoming a district-free city in 2026.

Once the seat of the Counts of Hanau, Hanau lost much of its architectural heritage, such as its City Palace, in World War II. A British air raid in 1945 created a firestorm, killing a sixth of the remaining population and destroying 98% of the old city and 80% of the city overall. The outer parts of the city have old timbered towns like Hanau-Steinheim and castles like Schloss Philippsruhe.

In 1963, Hanau hosted the third Hessentag state festival. Until 2005, Hanau was the administrative centre of the Main-Kinzig-Kreis. On 19 February 2020, a gunman attacked two bars and a kiosk in Hanau, murdering nine people with roots outside Germany, before shooting his mother and himself.

== Geography ==
The historic core of Hanau is within a semicircle of the river Kinzig that flows into the river Main just west of the city. Today, after a substantial expansion during the 19th and 20th centuries, it also extends to the river Main. After a restructuring of municipal borders within Hesse in the 1970s, a couple of nearby villages and towns were incorporated. After that change, Hanau for the first time also extended to the south bank of the Main.

=== Climate ===
On the 0 °C isotherm, Hanau has a humid continental climate as Eastern Germany with warm summer, classified by Köppen as Dfb. In the -3 °C isotherm has oceanic climate (Cfb) with some interior characteristics. Hanau is the westernmost city on the European continent below 200 m at sea level in this category.

Climate data for Hanau
Month	Jan	Feb	Mar	Apr	May	Jun	Jul	Aug	Sep	Oct	Nov	Dec	Year
Record high °C (°F)	13 (55)	18 (64)	26 (79)	30 (86)	33 (91)	35 (95)	36 (97)	36 (97)	31 (88)	27 (81)	20 (68)	16 (61)	36 (97)
Mean daily maximum °C (°F)	3 (37)	5 (41)	10 (50)	14 (57)	19 (66)	22 (72)	24 (75)	24 (75)	19 (66)	14 (57)	8 (46)	4 (39)	14 (57)
Mean daily minimum °C (°F)	−2 (28)	−1 (30)	2 (36)	4 (39)	8 (46)	11 (52)	13 (55)	12 (54)	9 (48)	5 (41)	2 (36)	−2 (28)	5 (41)
Record low °C (°F)	−20 (−4)	—	−12 (10)	−5 (23)	—	3 (37)	4 (39)	2 (36)	1 (34)	−2 (28)	−9 (16)	—	−20 (−4)
Average precipitation mm (inches)	30 (1.2)	30 (1.2)	30 (1.2)	40 (1.6)	50 (2.0)	70 (2.8)	50 (2.0)	50 (2.0)	50 (2.0)	30 (1.2)	50 (2.0)	50 (2.0)	530 (21.2)
Average snowfall cm (inches)	9 (3.5)	10 (3.9)	4 (1.6)	trace	0 (0)	0 (0)	0 (0)	0 (0)	0 (0)	0 (0)	6 (2.4)	10 (3.9)	46 (18)
Average rainy days	10	8	8	9	10	10	10	10	8	8	10	10	111
Average snowy days	4	3	1	1	0	0	0	0	0	0	1	3	13
Average relative humidity (%)	89	84	85	82	80	80	81	84	89	91	89	90	85
Mean daily sunshine hours	1	3	4	6	7	7	7	6	5	3	1	1	4
Source: WeatherBase and Fremdenverkehrsbuero.info (temperature, rainy and sunny days)

=== Districts ===
- Innenstadt (city center)
- Nordwest (northwest) incl. Wilhelmsbad
- Südost (southeast)
- Lamboy
- Steinheim
- Klein-Auheim (Hanau)
- Großauheim
- Wolfgang
- Kesselstadt
- Mittelbuchen

== Name ==
'Hanau' derives from Hagenowe, a combination of Haag ('wood') and Aue ('open land by the side of a river').

== History ==
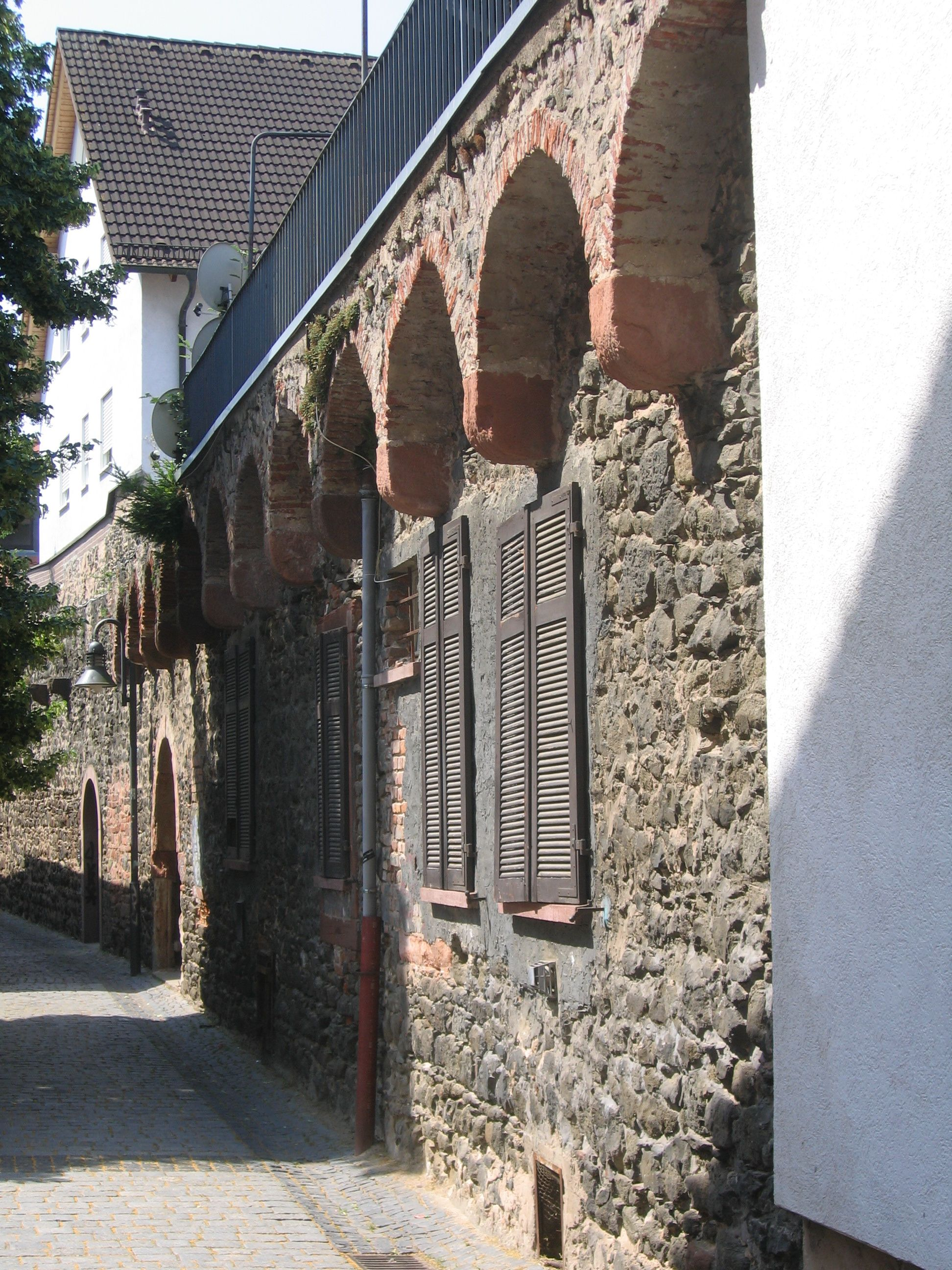
Relic of the first (medieval) town-fortification

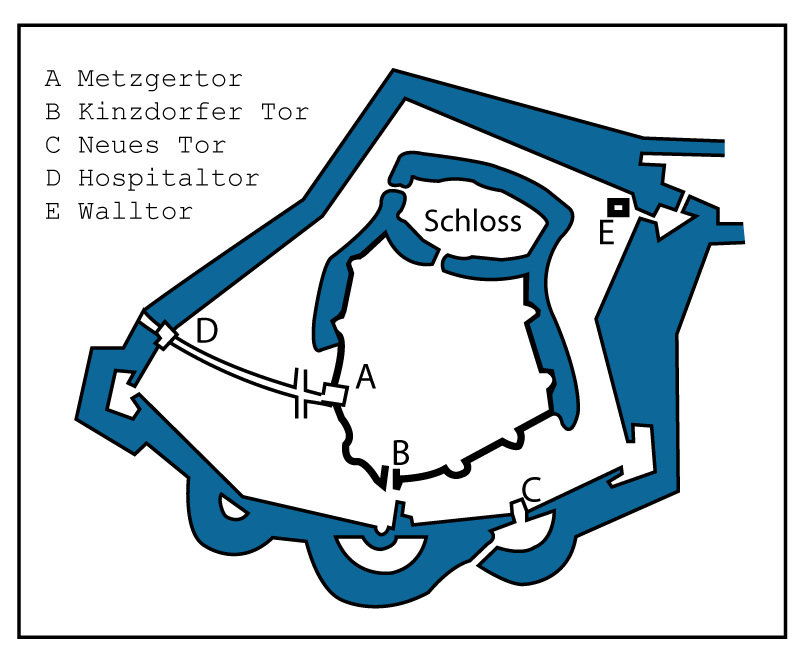
Hanau in around 1550. Centre: medieval town; Schloss = castle; A+B: gates within the medieval town wall; C+D: gates of the 16th century fortification

=== Old town ===
Hanau was first mentioned as a settlement in 1143. It was the site of a castle that used the river Kinzig as a defense. The castle belonged to a noble family that began calling themselves "of Hanau" in the 13th century. A village developed around the castle and it became a town in 1303. As a result of this history, Hanau's main church stood outside its walls in the village of Kinzdorf. The villagers moved into Hanau and Kinzdorf became an abandoned village, leaving only the church. In the 15th century the status of the Hanau parish church was transferred to the church of Mary Magdalene within the town walls.

Shortly after the first town walls were built at the beginning of the 14th century, the town outgrew this limit. Outside the wall, along the road to Frankfurt am Main, a settlement developed (the Vorstadt) that was properly included in the fortifications of Hanau only when Hanau received completely new Renaissance-style fortifications during the first half of the 16th century. These fortifications enclosed three elements: the medieval castle, the town of Hanau, and the Vorstadt.

=== New town ===
==== Huguenots ====
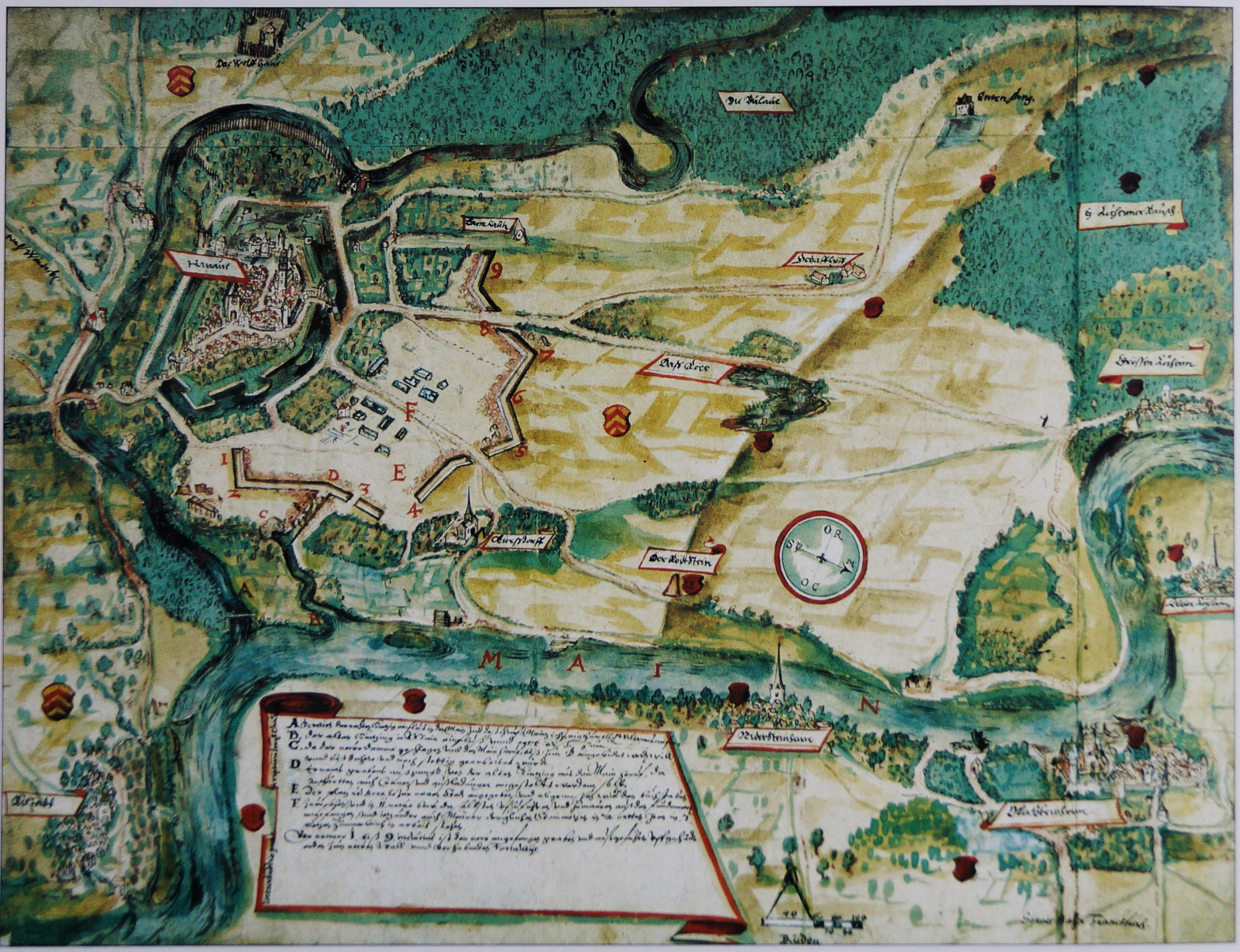
New town in progress, Hanau 1597

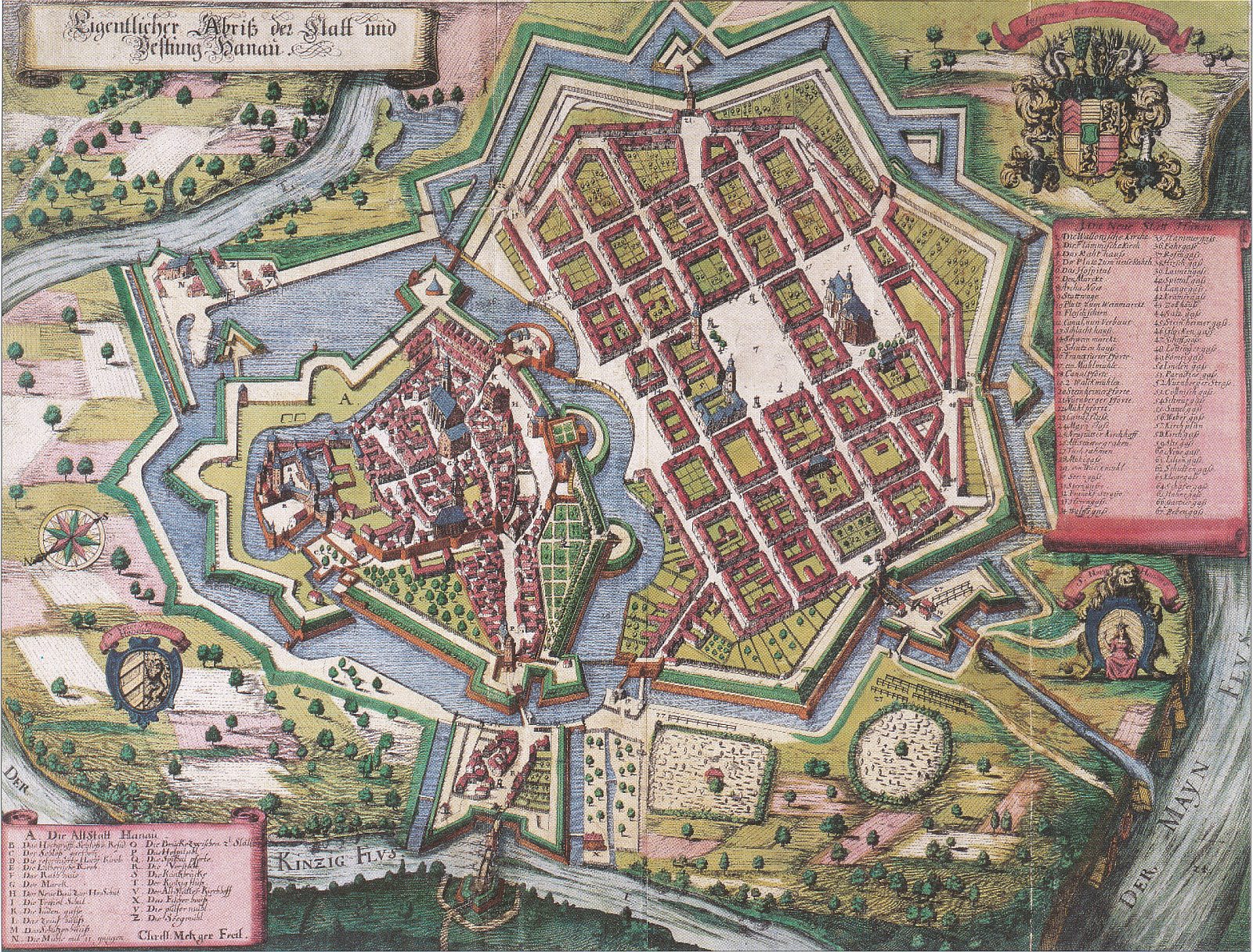
City and fortress of Hanau 1684

In 1597 Count Philipp Ludwig II attracted French Protestant (Huguenots) refugees, who had been admitted to Frankfurt but had only very limited accommodation, to found their own settlement south of Hanau. This happened under the direction of the guardian of the Hanau count, Johann VI von Nassau-Dillenburg, who hoped for significant economic and cultural advances from the settlement of the 'Réfugiés' from south-west France. In return for the assurance of free exercise of their religion, the refugees undertook to become economically active in Hanau. Out of this tradition, goldsmiths are still trained in Hanau. Hanau also was the site of the first workshop to produce faïence (tin-glazed pottery) within Germany. These new citizens were granted privileges and formed their own community, church and administration for the "new town of Hanau" (Neustadt Hanau) wholly separate from the existing community. A stark contrast to the Catholic Church, but also to the Lutheran Church of the time, was the participation of laypeople in church-governing functions, as well as the design of the church, especially the decalogues (boards displaying the Ten Commandments). Each congregation was led by a Consistoire, elected by congregation members for life, which is roughly comparable to today's church council. The descendants of the French Reformed religious refugees have assimilated in Hanau over time.

==== Walloon-Dutch refugees and Jews ====
In contrast to the Huguenots, Walloon and Dutch Calvinist refugees came from an area of what is now the Netherlands, Belgium, and the French Département Nord at the time of Spanish rule, the Spanish Netherlands. With the arrival of the Huguenots, Walloons and Dutch, Hanau's rise to an important business location began. Until 1821, the new town had its own independent community, independent of the old town. The Reformed Walloon-Dutch community still exists today.

Philipp Ludwig II also allowed Jews to settle in Hanau. From 1604 there was a Jewish community again.

It took more than 200 years to amalgamate both. The new town, larger than the old one, was protected by a then very modern fortification in Baroque style, which proved a big asset only a few years later in the Thirty Years' War. The town survived a siege in 1637 with only minor damage.

The new citizens formed the major economic and political power within the County of Hanau and in 1642 played a leading role in the succession of Count Fredrik Casimir of Hanau Lichtenberg into the County of Hanau-Münzenberg, of which Hanau was the capital.

=== 17th century ===
During the Thirty Years' War Hanau was taken by the Swedes in 1631. In 1636 it was besieged by imperial troops but was relieved on the 13 June by William V, Landgrave of Hesse-Kassel, on account of which the inhabitants commemorate that day.

=== 18th century ===
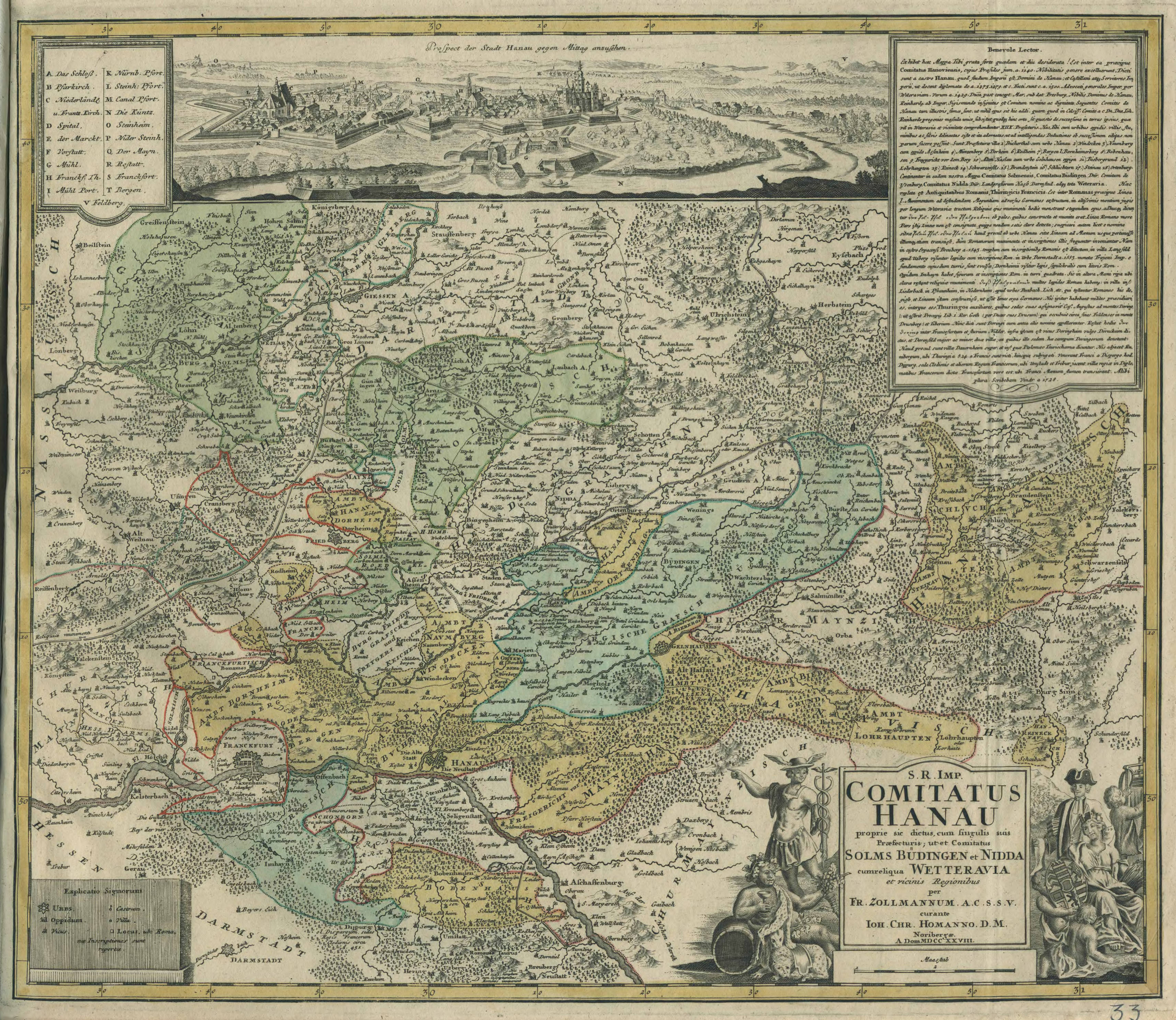
Map of Hanau from 1728

Johann Reinhard III of Hanau-Lichtenberg, the last of the Counts of Hanau, died in 1736. Those parts of his county belonging to the County of Hanau-Münzenberg, which included Hanau, were inherited by the Landgrave of Hesse-Kassel. Due to dynastic troubles within his family, the County of Hesse-Hanau was created a separate state from the Landgraviate until 1786. So Hanau remained the capital for another 50 years. Even after that it became the second-most important town in Hesse-Kassel, after Kassel.

=== 19th century ===
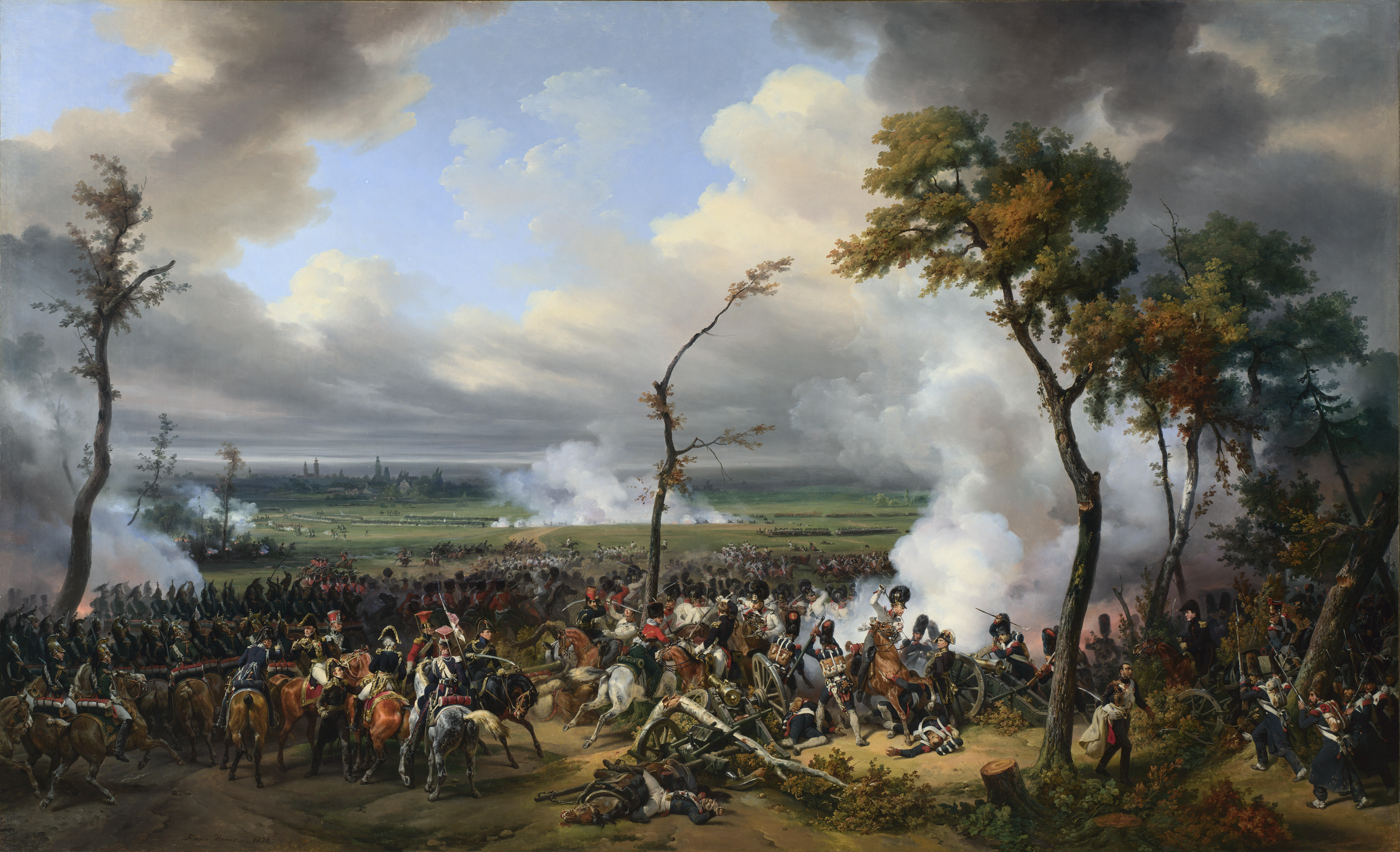
The Battle of Hanau (1813) by Horace Vernet – it was won by Napoleon

During the Napoleonic Wars, Napoleon I ordered the fortifications of Hanau destroyed. This created a chance for both parts of the town to expand across their former limits. In 1813, the Battle of Hanau took place near the city between French troops and Austro-Bavarian forces; the former won. During the 1820s the administrations of both towns of Hanau merged. The first common mayor, who became lord mayor (Oberbürgermeister), was Bernhard Eberhard. He became prime minister and minister of the interior of the Electorate of Hesse after the Revolution of 1848.

With its preindustrial workshops, Hanau became a nucleus of a heavy industrialisation during the 19th century from within the city (e.g., Heraeus) as well as from outside (e.g., Degussa and Dunlop). This was heavily supported by its development as an important railway interchange of six railway lines, most of them main lines:

- 1848: Frankfurt-Hanau Railway
- 1854: Main–Spessart Railway
- 1867: Frankfurt–Bebra Railway, eastern direction
- 1873: Frankfurt–Bebra Railway, western direction
- 1879/1881: Friedberg–Hanau Railway
- 1882: Odenwald Railway

==== Revolution of 1848 ====
1848 Hanau was a centre of the German democratic movement and contributed significantly both in 1830 and in the Revolution of 1848. As part of this movement the German Gymnastic League (Deutscher Turnerbund) was founded here in 1848. Like all of Hesse-Kassel, Hanau was annexed to Prussia in 1866 after its prince-elector took the Austrian side in the Austro-Prussian War. It remained part of Prussia until 1945.

In the late 19th century Hanau became a major garrison town. Due to its interchange of railway lines a large detachment of military railway-engineers as well as other military units were stationed here.

As a free-trade city, Hanau developed a silver manufacturing industry using fantasy hallmarks. Hanau silver was produced from the mid-19th to the early 20th century.

=== 20th century ===
During World War II, Hanau's Jewish population was persecuted. The last Jews were deported in May 1942.

Hanau's inner city was mostly destroyed by British airstrikes in March 1945, a few days before it was taken by the U.S. Army. Around 87% of the town was destroyed. Of the city's 15,000 inhabitants at the time, 2,500 died in the attack.

Hanau housed one of the largest garrisons of the U.S. Army in Europe. It was an important strategic location in the so-called Fulda Gap. The military community had a population of 45,000 military members, U.S. civilians and family members at its peak during the Cold War. The extensive U.S. facilities included Hanau Army Airfield, also known as Fliegerhorst Langendiebach. The garrison closed in 2018. Most of the former military areas have been converted to civil use.

=== 21st century ===
In 2010, Hanau started a huge building project to completely redesign the inner city. These are the town's largest construction projects since the reconstruction after World War II.

On 19 February 2020, eleven people—including the perpetrator—were killed in a spree shooting at two shisha bars and a flat in the town. The perpetrator, known as Tobias Rathjen, opened fire at Midnight Bar and Arena Bar in Hanau centre and Kesselstadt. He then drove home, where he killed his mother and himself.

After reaching 100,000 inhabitants in September 2021, Hanau became the largest city in the Main-Kinzig-Kreis. On 1 January 2026, the city seceded from the district to become a district-free city (kreisfreie Stadt) once again, restoring a status it had previously held until the Hessian district reformation of 1974.

== Notable people ==
- Johann Philipp Achilles Leisler (1771 or 1772 – 1813), physician and naturalist

== Economy ==
At present, many inhabitants work for the technological group Heraeus, or commute to Frankfurt.

Multiple companies, mostly in the chemical industry, are located in the industrial park named Wolfgang, operated by Evonik Industries.

Nuclear energy company Nukem was headquartered in Hanau, with a nuclear fuel plant in its Wolfgang district, until 1988.

== Population ==
- With 101,364 residents, Hanau is the sixth-most populous town in Hesse. Having lost its status as administrative centre of the Main-Kinzig-Kreis (Main-Kinzig district) to Gelnhausen in 2005, proposals have been made that Hanau should form its own administrative district by 1 January 2026.
- More than 20% of the inhabitants are foreign nationals, mostly Turks.

Largest groups of foreign residents
Nationality	Population (2011)
Turkey	8,010
Italy	1,917
Poland	943
Serbia & Montenegro	647
Bosnia	560
Spain	560

== Jewish community ==
The earliest documentary evidence of Jews in Hanau is from 1313. In the 17th and 18th centuries Hanau developed into an important center of Hebrew printing. The community numbered 540 in 1805, 80 families in 1830, 447 persons in 1871, and 657 at the turn of the century. In 1925 there were 568 Jews in Hanau. Hanau Jews suffered persecution under Nazism, and its synagogue was set ablaze during the Kristallnacht pogrom. The community, which had numbered 477 individuals in 1933, had dwindled by 1939 to just 82. On 30 May 1942, German soldiers deported 75 Jews from Hanau to the ghetto at Theresienstadt, from which many were sent onward to Auschwitz. Only individuals married to non-Jews, or having one non-Jewish parent, remained, most of whom were themselves deported to Theresienstadt in February 1945 and survived the Holocaust.

== Twin towns – sister cities ==
Hanau is twinned with:

- Conflans-Sainte-Honorine, France
- Dartford, United Kingdom
- Francheville, France
- Nilüfer, Turkey
- Taizhou, China
- Tottori, Japan
- Yaroslavl, Russia

=== Friendly cities ===
Hanau also has friendly relations with:

- Waltershausen, Germany
- Pays de Hanau, France

== Transport ==
=== Rail ===
Hanau is a transportation hub, with its main station serving the following lines:

- Frankfurt-Hanau Railway (RE / RB 55),
- Main-Spessart-Bahn (from Hanau to Aschaffenburg Hauptbahnhof) (RE / RB 55),
- Kinzig Valley Railway to Fulda (RE / RB 50),
- Frankfurt-Bebraer railway (westbound) to Offenbach Hauptbahnhof, Frankfurt am Main Hauptbahnhof as well as the largely parallel south metropolitan S-Bahn,
- Friedberg-Hanau railway (RB 33) and
- Odenwaldbahn (RE / RB 64) towards Babenhausen, Groß-Umstadt-Wiebelsbach, Erbach and Eberbach.

Besides the main station, the town is also served by Hanau West and Hanau-Wilhelmsbad on the Frankfurt-Hanau Railway, Großauheim on the Main-Spessart-Bahn, Wolfgang an der Kinzigtalbahn, the S-Bahn station at Steinheim (Main) on the South-Main S-Bahn, Hanau Nord at the Hanau-Friedberger Bahn, and Hanau-Klein Auheim on the Odenwaldbahn.

=== Air ===
The city is served by Frankfurt International Airport which located is 30 km to the southwest of Hanau.

== Sights ==
- Deutsches Goldschmiedehaus
- Schloss Philippsruhe
- Wilhelmsbad (historic spa)
- Marienkirche (Hanau) (St Mary's Church)
- Wallonisch-Niederländische Kirche
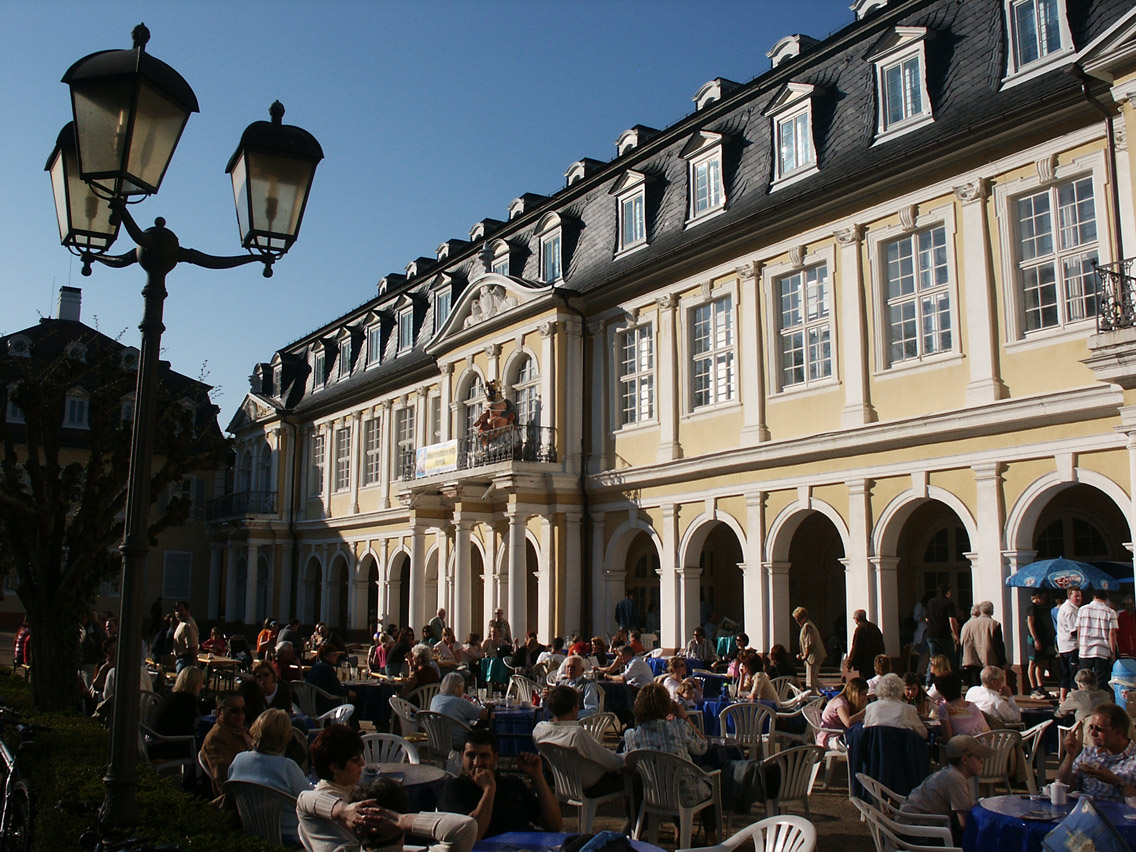
Historic spa of Wilhelmsbad - today a part of Hanau

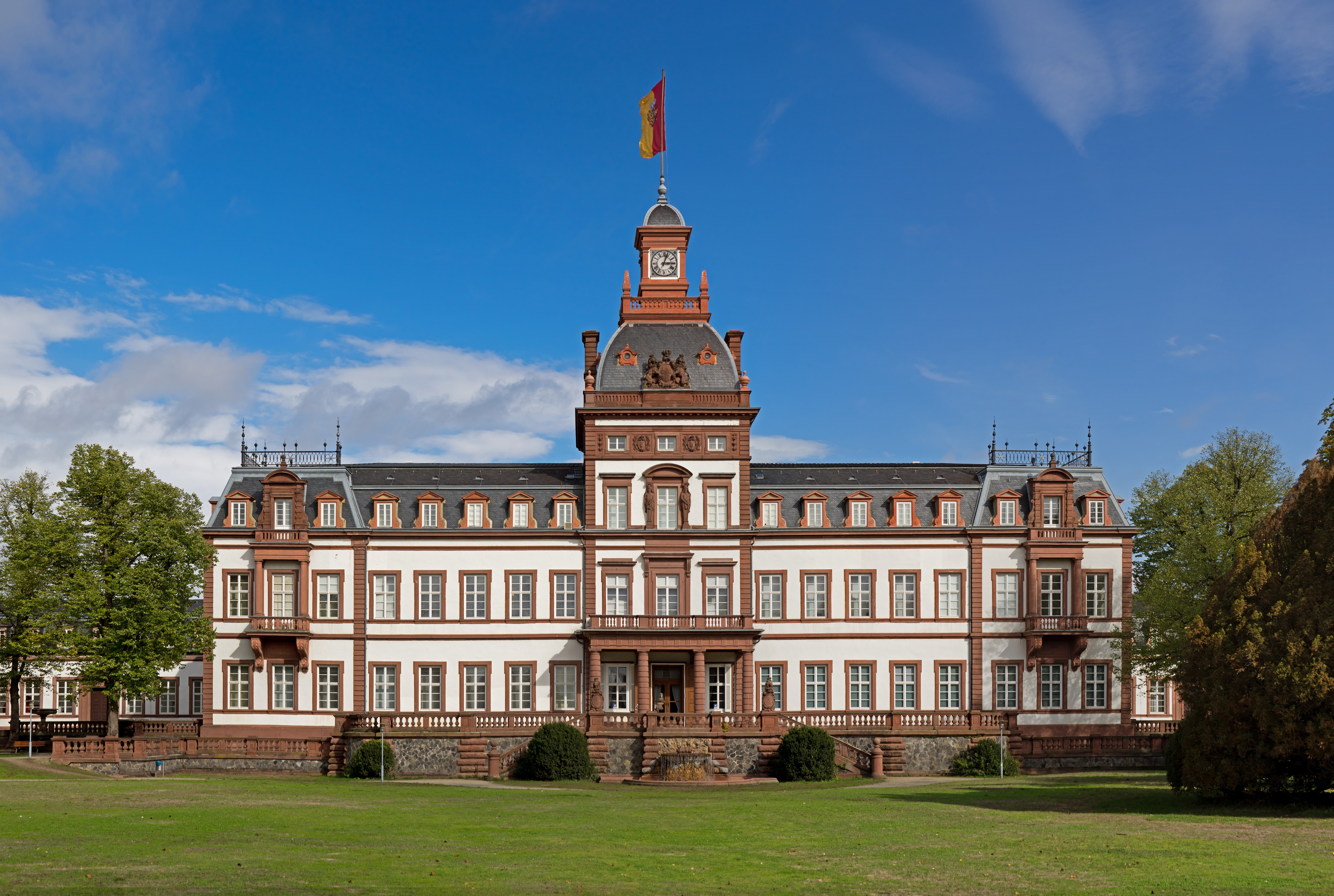
Schloss Philippsruhe

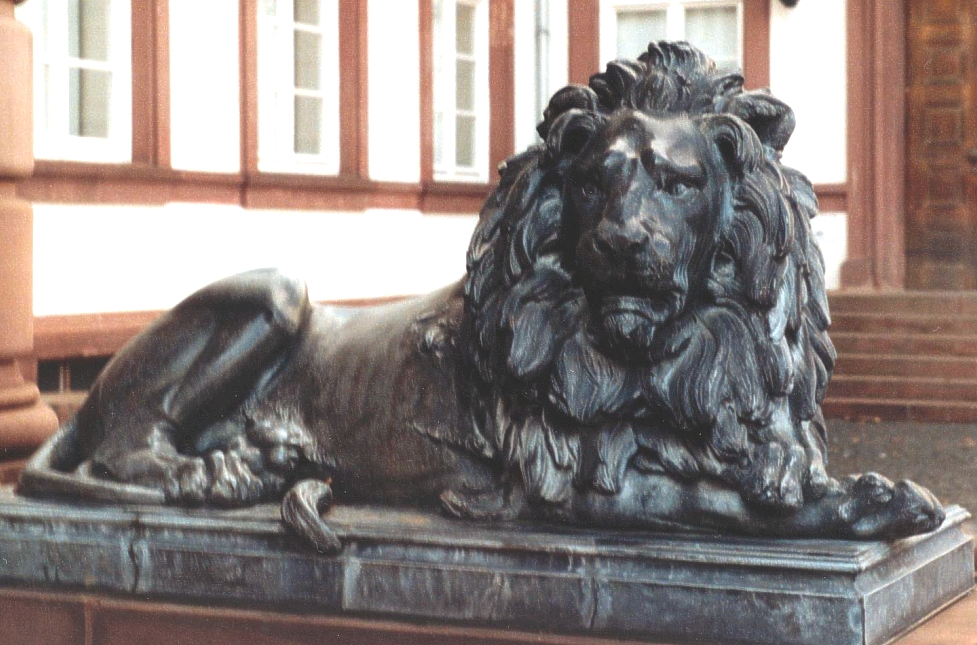
Lion at Schloss Philippsruhe by Christian Daniel Rauch

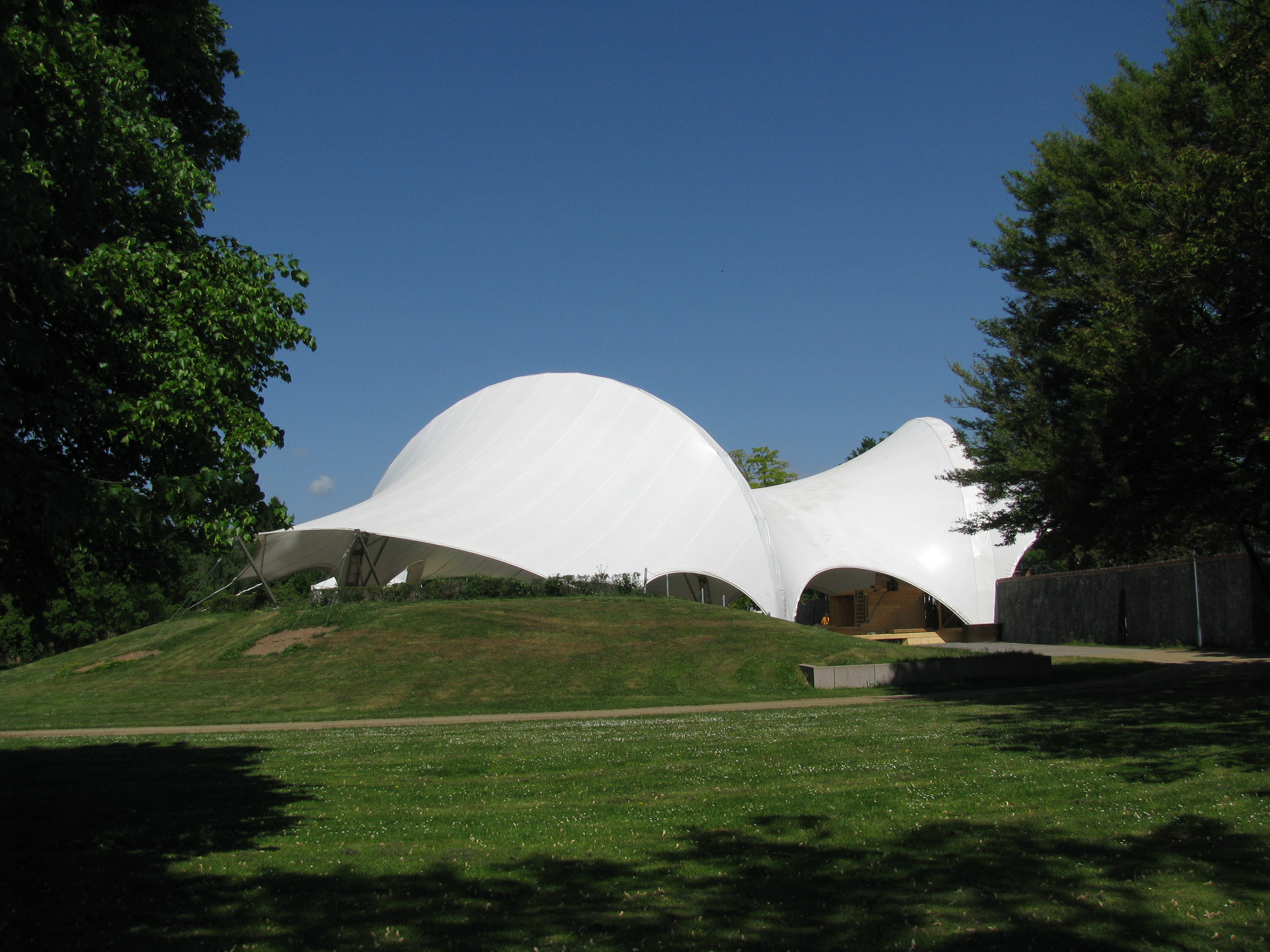
Amphitheater Hanau

== Notable people ==
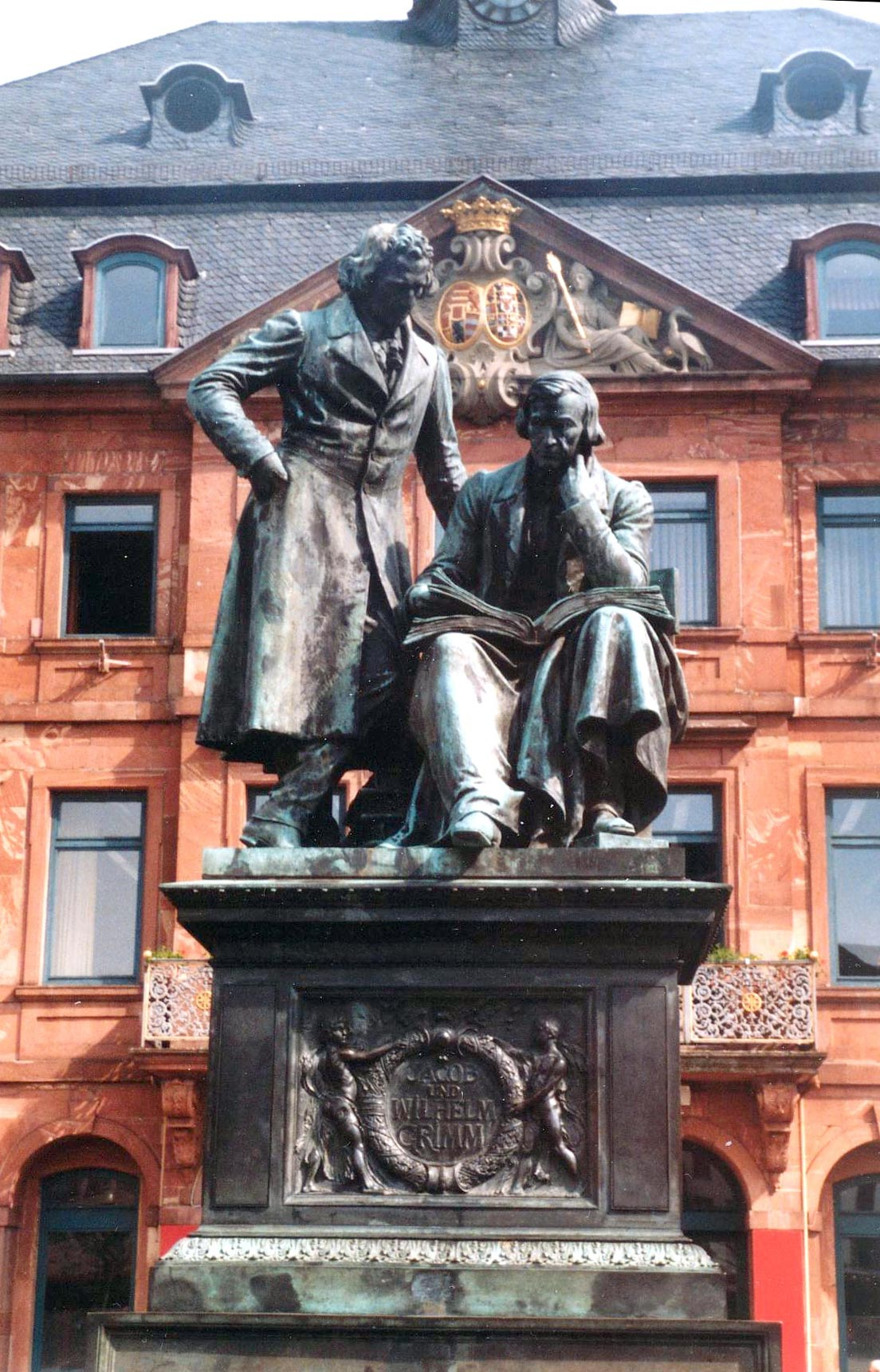
Sculpture of the Brothers Grimm in Hanau, by Syrius Eberle

- Louis Appia, surgeon, member of the Geneva "Committee of Five" (precursor to the International Committee of the Red Cross)
- Johann Christian Claudius Devaranne, anti-Napoleon resistance leader, born in Hanau
- Siegmund Feniger, also known as Nyanaponika Thera, Buddhist monk
- Jürgen Grasmück, author of horror fiction and science fiction stories, born in Hanau
- The Brothers Grimm (Brüder Grimm), born in Hanau; they collected many German fairy tales and started work on a German glossary
- Ludwig Emil Grimm, painter, younger brother of Jacob and Wilhelm
- Solomon Hanau, 17th-century Hebrew-language linguistic master
- Hans Daniel Hassenpflug, German statesman
- Paul Hindemith, composer
- Stefan Jagsch, extreme-right politician
- Gunther Köhler, herpetologist
- Alois Kottmann, violinist, born in Großauheim
- Johann Peter Krafft, painter
- Heinrich Kuhl (1797–1821), naturalist and zoologist
- Moritz Daniel Oppenheim, painter often regarded as the first Jewish painter of the modern era
- Eduard Friedrich Wilhelm Pflüger, physiologist
- Daniel la Rosa, racing driver
- Bodo Sperling, painter and conceptual artist
- Karl Storck, sculptor born in Hanau
- Hermann Volk, Roman Catholic bishop in Mainz
- Rudi Völler, football/soccer world champion and coach
- Wilhelm Wagenfeld, designer
- Jeanne Wyttenbach, philosopher and novelist

== Sports ==
- Turngemeinde 1837 Hanau a.V. (TGH), one of the oldest of Germany's sports clubs
- Hanauer Rudergesellschaft 1879 e.V. (HRG), one of Germany's oldest rowing clubs
- Hanau 93 (1. Hanauer Fußball Club 1893 e.V. or very short just "HFC"), Hesse's oldest association football club
