= Jürgen Grasmück =

Jürgen Grasmück (Born 23. January 1940 in Hanau, Hessen; Died 7. August 2007 in Altenstadt) was a German author of horror-fiction and science-fiction novels.

He wrote under the pseudonyms Albert C. Bowles, Bert Floorman, YES Garett, JA Gorman, Jay Grams, Jürgen Grasse, YES Grouft, Jeff Hammon, Ron Kelly, Rolf Murat, Steve D. rock, Dan Shocker, Owen L. Todd and Henri Vadim.

He is best known for the series of horror fiction stories "Macabros" and "Larry Brent," which he wrote under the pen name Dan Shocker. An episode of the radio adaption of his 'Larry Brent' stories (Episode 9, Snakeheads of Dr. Gorgo) was banned by German censors in 1984.

Larry Brent

- 001: Horror Creeps through Bonnard's House (1968, Magic Circle, ISBN 978-3-96282-110-4)
- 002: Fear Awakens in the Castle of Death (1968, Magic Circle, ISBN 978-3-96282-111-1)
- 003: In the Gallery of Horrors (1968, Magic Circle, ISBN 3-932171-80-2)
- 004: The Demon with the Deadly Eyes (1969, Magic Circle, ISBN 3-932171-80-2)
- 005: At Night, when the Dead come out (1969, Magic Circle, ISBN 978-3-96282-114-2)
