= Jeanne Wyttenbach =

Dutch philosopher and novelist

Jeanne Wyttenbach-Gallien (December 29, 1773 – April 27, 1830), also known as Daniel Jeanne Gallien, was a Dutch philosopher and novelist.

== Early life and education ==
Born in Hanau, Germany, Jeanne Gallien was a daughter of Susanne Katharina Wyttenbach and engraver Louis Jean Gallien who founded and taught at the Hanau Drawing Academy. In 1792, Gallien went to Amsterdam to take care of her uncle, Daniel Wyttenbach Jr, professor of history and rhetoric and of Greek and Latin literature at Athenaeum Illustre. In 1799, both of them moved to Leiden when her uncle was appointed professor and librarian at Leiden University. That is where Gallien studied Classics and philosophy while helping her uncle with his work at the library.

== Marriage and widowhood ==
After the 1807 Leiden Gunpowder Disaster destroyed their house, Gallien and Wyttenbach moved to a country house called ‘d’Hooge Boom’ (The Tall Tree) in Oegstgeest. The couple got married in 1817 after receiving a special dispensation from King Willem I. In the same year, Wyttenbach retired from his professorial post. He died from a stroke four years later.

== Career ==
Jeanne Gallien (later Wyttenbach) started writing in French after 1808 and has five known books to her name: Théagène (1815), Banquet de Léontis (1817), Histoire de ma petite chienne Hermione (1820), Symposiaques ou Propos de table(1823) and Alexis (1823). All five were originally published in Paris and some were later translated to German and Dutch. She started publishing under a pseudonym "Mademoiselle G.", but after her marriage, changed it to "Mme Wyttenbach, née G".
