= Smiling Angel =

Statue of an angel in Reims, France

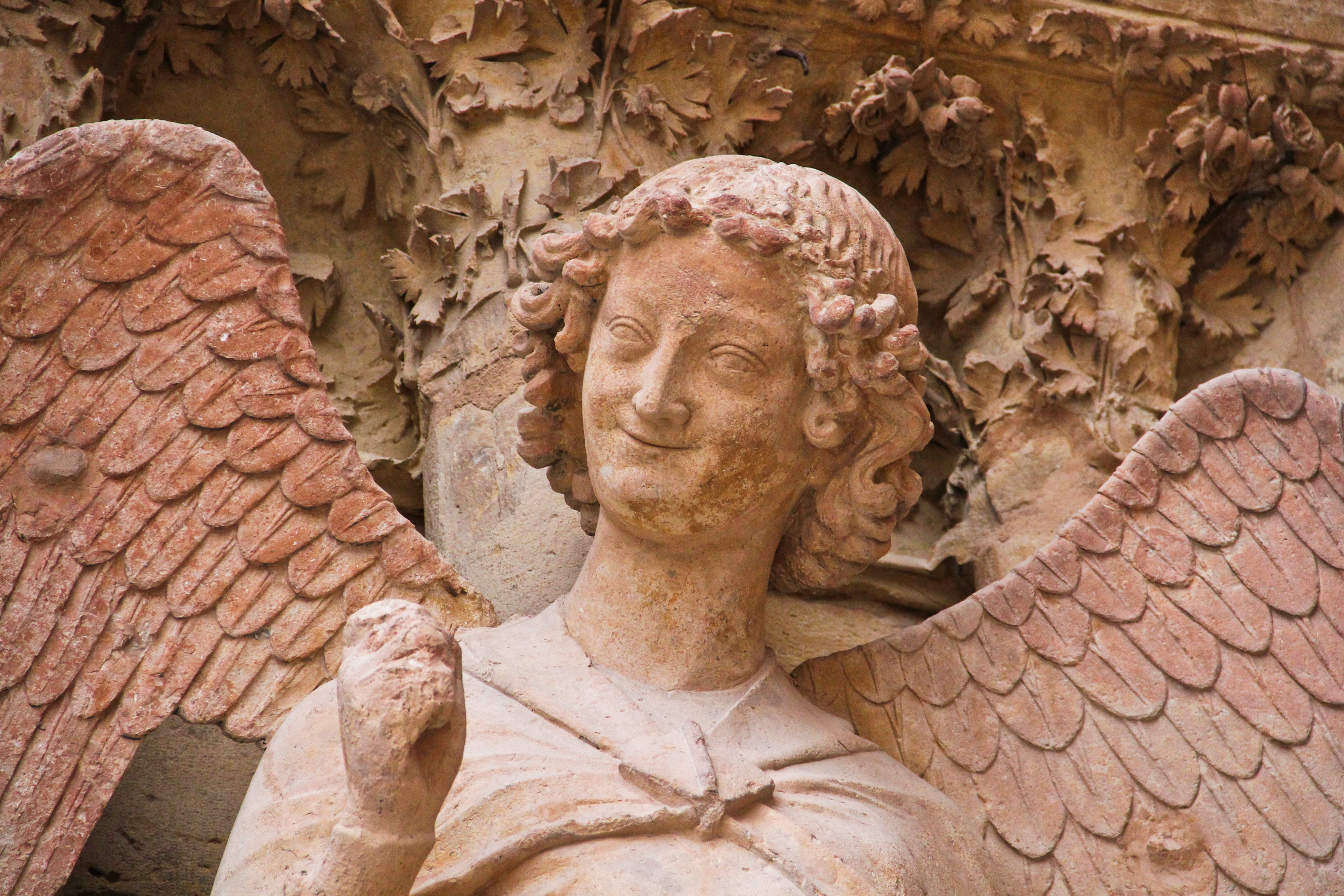
The Smiling Angel

The Smiling Angel (French: L'Ange au Sourire), also known as the Smile of Reims (French: Le Sourire de Reims) or Angel of the Annunciation, is a stone sculpture at the Cathedral of Reims. Sculptors that were pioneers of the Gothic style came from workshops in Chartres, Paris and Amiens to work on the Reims Cathedral.The most striking aspect of the cathedral is its façade, particularly its Annunciation sculpture, which includes the "Smiling Angel". The Angel was carved between 1236 and 1245.This figure is located on the right side of the north portal of the west facade.

The Smiling Angel sculpture is one of thousands at the Reims Cathedral and just one example of the many gothic sculptures in the world. It has gained much popularity throughout history and is recognized today as a tourist attraction in Reims, France. The significance of the sculpture expands beyond the aesthetic and religious ideas that first meet the eye. The Smiling Angel represents a combination of cultural, political, and social trends in art, French history, the Middle Ages, and Christianity.

== Historical Context ==
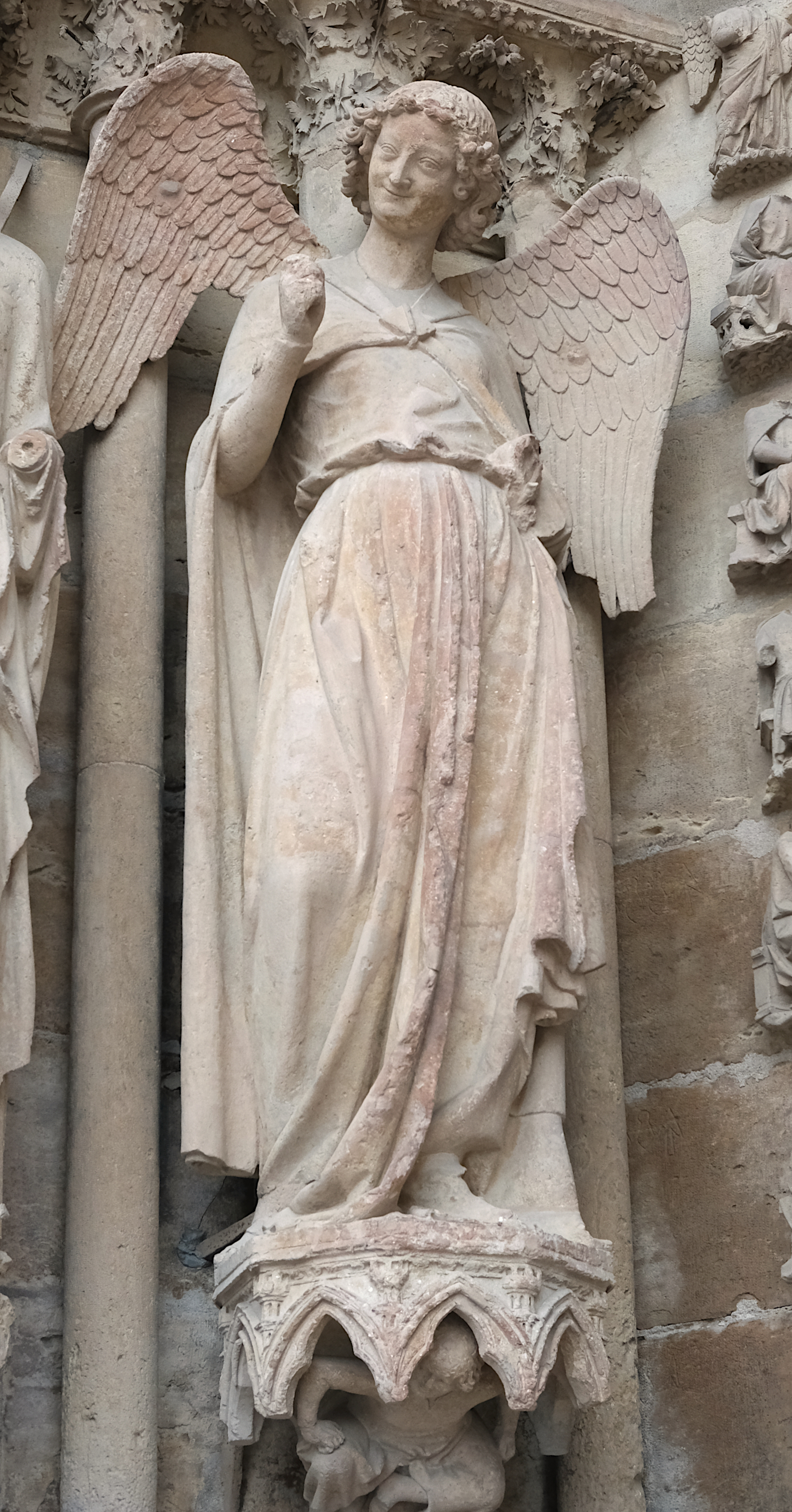
The Smiling Angel in 2019.

=== Local and French History ===
The Reims Cathedral was first built in the 5th century by the bishop, Saint Nicasius. Throughout time, there have been multiple different reconstructions and changes of the Reims Cathedral. Although, the building that stands today was the one commissioned by the archbishop Aubry de Humbert. It is traditionally believed that a fire in 1210 preceded the laying of the first stone of the new cathedral in 1211. Although some historians challenge these dates, arguing both the fire and reconstruction happened in 1207. Archbishop Aubry de Humbert intended to have coronations for French Kings held at the Reims Cathedral.

The Reims Cathedral holds a large historical importance to the city of Reims, France. Archbishop Aubry de Humbert intended to have coronations for French Kings held at the Reims Cathedral. In addition, the Reims Cathedral is historically important to a few religious figures. Saint Nicasius, the original commissioner, was martyred. And in the 5th century St. Remigius baptised King Clovis, which was an influential event for Christianity in Europe.

Due to the large historical importance and intentions behind the new cathedral, the Smiling Angel was built to reflect religious and political history of Reims and France. This is seen through the Smiling Angels placement. The angel is within the Saints Portal and stands next to St. Nicasius. The intentional statue next to St. Nicasius, that one sees when they walk in, demonstrates the significance of local and French history.

=== Middle Ages History ===
Broader Medieval themes are also reflected through the Smiling Angel. At the time, churches were centers of worship and important to daily cultural and religious lives. Unlike current day Christian practices, in the Middle Ages, the church was the only place that one could receive salvation and biblical teachings. Many people of the Middle Ages were also illiterate or at varied literacy levels. The gothic style of the Smiling Angel was important for the church to tell a story through statue and art.

Due to these broader trends, the Smiling Angel reflects religious ideas during the Middle Ages. The angel tells a story through physical representation, reflecting upon literacy rates and education that are linked to status and class divides.

=== Historical Importance ===
Overall, the Smiling Angel is one element to the Cathedral that adds to the overall reinforcement of many historical themes. The angel holds a strong historical and cultural context that reflects upon the City of Reims, France in the Middle Ages, and the broader themes of the Middle Ages in Europe. It is an overall visual representation of Reims history, French history, religious authority, political authority, Medieval history, Catholicism, and more.

== Gothic Influence and Importance ==
The statue's flowing drapery and the illusion that the figure is detached from the façade and jamb columns behind it are typical of the International Gothic style. The Smiling Angel is comparable to a nearby statue of St. Joseph, also situated on the Reims Cathedral facade on the left jamb in the central doorway of the west portal, who shares a similar smirking facial expression. Both works are believed to have been designed by the so-called "Joseph Master" or "Master of the Smiling Angels". Although little is known about this artist, his style is recognizable in the works on the Reims Cathedral facade. The "Joseph Master" of the Amiens school became a master of drapery, shifting poses, and facial expressions.

=== The Emergence of the Gothic Style ===
The Smiling Angel overall reflects the periodization of Gothic Art and the influence the sculpture had on the style. As opposed to the previous art/architecture style of romanesque, the gothic style focused on expression and magnification, which is emphasized the in Smiling Angel. One reason the style emerged is due a broader cultural change in viewing religious figures. As cultural ideas within the religion in Christianity placed an emphasis on the humanism of Jesus and Saints, this was reflected into the Gothic style. This allowed people who viewed the gothic sculptures to feel a closer connection to their God. In addition, it emerged due to cultural ideas that understand how realism allowed everyone access to higher thinking and historical knowledge. Because the Smiling Angel represents the Gothic style, it also represents the cultural and religious ideas that were meant to be expressed through the gothic style like magnification, humanism, and inclusivity.

=== The Expansion of the Gothic Style ===
Shortly after and around the time of the Smiling Angels and Reims Cathedrals building, the Gothic style largely grew in popularity in Europe. The workshops at the Reims Cathedral were "training grounds for stone carvers who, when work there wrapped up or was interrupted, would bring their skills to sires all over Europe." The influence of the Smiling Angel can be demonstrated by the fact that many art historians often label art with a title the "Reims Style."

Although, it must be understood that the Smiling Angel was not the first ever gothic sculpture. This is represented in the understanding that many sculptors working on the Reims Cathedral also worked on the Chartres Cathedral. Therefore, the Smiling Angel further reflects innovativeness and the evolution of art styles. The Smiling Angels immense expression, jamb column, drapery, and hair defined the Gothic style, yet rather proves an evolution of art trends.

== Interpretation ==
The meaning behind "The Smiling Angel's" smile has been much discussed, including what it means and whether it is nurturing or solemn. For instance, it has been described as gaudium aeternum, which translates to the eternal joy of heaven. A person living in the medieval world may have seen the Annunciation or "Smiling Angel" as a representation of John's Revelation 21:2-27, in which he saw angels made of stone standing in doorways with unforgettable smiles of heavenly joy.

=== The Statue During WW1 ===
The Angel statue was beheaded following a fire caused by a German shell on the cathedral of Reims, during World War I, on 19 September 1914, and the head broke into several pieces after falling from a height of four meters. The head was collected by the abbot Thinot the day after the fire, and stored in the cellars of the Archbishop of Reims to be discovered by the architect Max Sainsaulieu on the 30 November 1915. It became an icon for the French wartime propaganda as a symbol of "French culture destroyed by German barbarity". After the war, the original fragments were molded and preserved in the Musée national des Monuments Français. The already famous sculpture was restored and put back on the Reims Cathedral 13, February 1926.

=== Overall Meaning ===
This change in interpretation further demonstrates the significance of the Smiling Angel. It demonstrates how a sculpture from the Middle Ages holds both a historical and present importance. The Smiling Angel is more than just a statue and it reflects the evolution of history and art in many ways.
