= Abaucourt =

- Commune
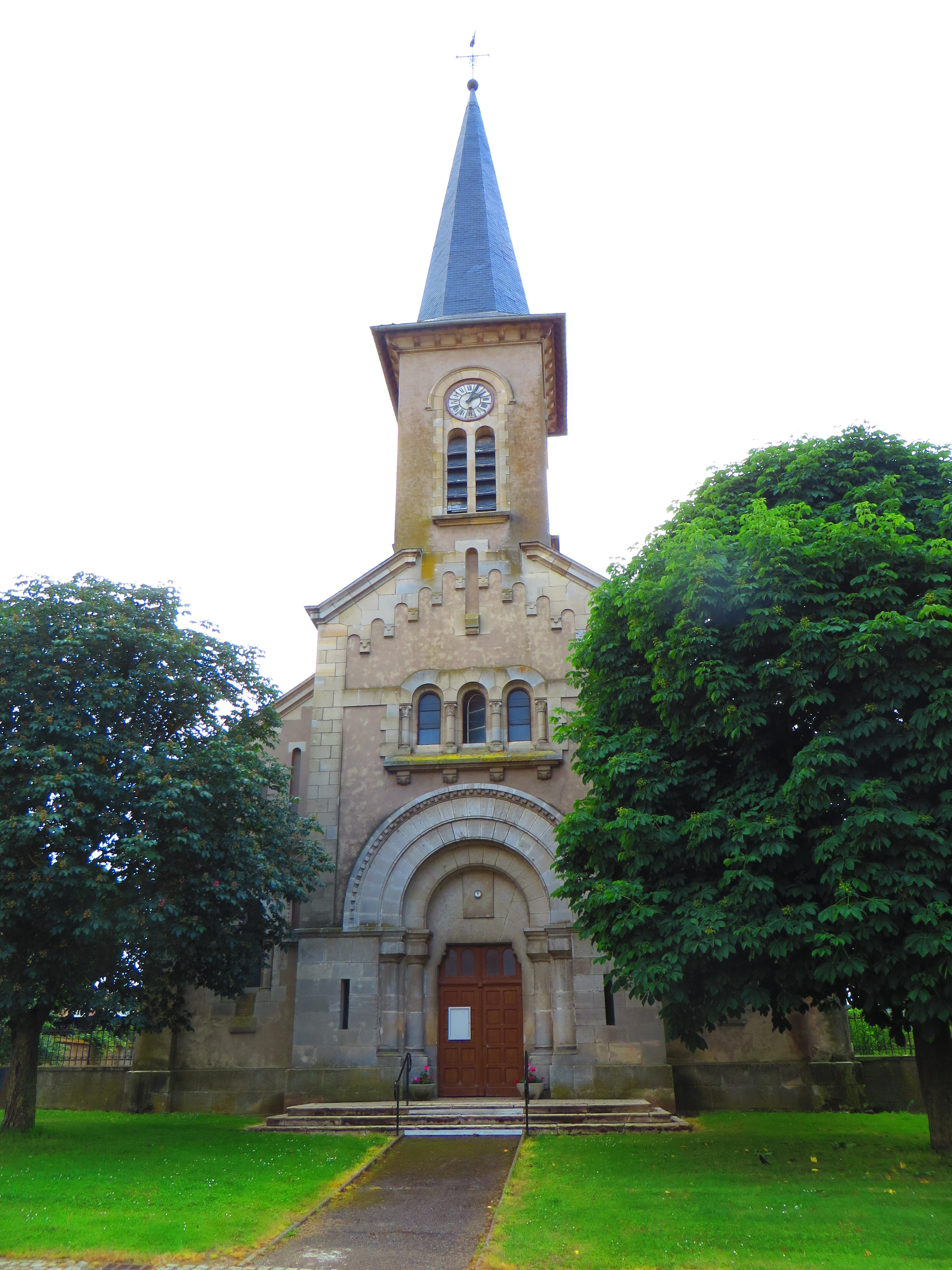
- The church in Abaucourt

- Coat of arms
- Location of Abaucourt
- Location within France Location within Grand Est
- Coordinates: 48°53′52″N 6°15′31″E
- Country: France
- Region: Grand Est
- Department: Meurthe-et-Moselle
- Arrondissement: Nancy
- Canton: Entre Seille et Meurthe
- Intercommunality: Seille et Grand Couronné

Government
  - Mayor (2020–2026): David Renkes
- Area^{1}: 7.8 km^{2} (3.0 sq mi)
- Elevation: 192 m (630 ft)
- Highest elevation: 235 m (771 ft)
- Lowest elevation: 182 m (597 ft)
- Population (2023): 330
  - Density: 42/km^{2} (110/sq mi)
- Demonym(s): Abaucourtois, Abaucourtoises
- Time zone: UTC+01:00 (CET)
  - Summer (DST): UTC+02:00 (CEST)
- INSEE/Postal code: 54001 /54610
- ^{1} French Land Register data, which excludes lakes, ponds, glaciers > 1 km^{2} (0.386 sq mi or 247 acres) and river estuaries.

Abaucourt (French pronunciation: [abokuʁ]) is a commune in the Meurthe-et-Moselle department in northeastern France.

== Geography ==
One arrives in Abaucourt by the D45 by way of Nomeny (by the west) or by Létricourt (by the southwest). 2.6 km separates it from Nomeny and region 15 of Pont-à-Mousson.

== History ==
- Etymology of the name:

Names ending in "court" come from the Latin "cortis", which indicated a farmyard. The name is applied to the farm itself, around which the village formed. Consequently, the etymology of the word Abaucourt could be considered as such :

Ab (preposition) = "of a different place"
Ad (preposition) = "at, towards, around"
Cortem, Cortis = "of the court, farm, property"

- Various titles from the 12th century (originated in the archives of the college of Fénétrange) mention Abaucourt and the court and estate of Vitrimont that depended on this village : one or the other belonged to Abbey of Saint Peter and Saint Paul in Neuwiller-lès-Saverne, Alsace. This it is attested by a papal bull issued by Pope Alexander III in 1178 where the church of Abaucourt was listed as property belonging to the abbey.
- Razing as a result of World War I

== Administration ==
List of Mayors
Election Date	Name
1988–2001	Étienne Messin
2001–2008	Hervé Mazzoli
2008–2020	Christophe Fieutelot
2020–Current	David Renkes

== Population ==
Inhabitants are called Abaucourtois in French.

Historical population

Year	Pop.	±% p.a.
1793	474	—
1800	551	+2.17%
1806	596	+1.32%
1821	622	+0.29%
1831	661	+0.61%
1836	636	−0.77%
1841	632	−0.13%
1846	644	+0.38%
1851	672	+0.85%
1856	614	−1.79%
1861	615	+0.03%
1872	609	−0.09%
1876	616	+0.29%
1881	604	−0.39%
1886	600	−0.13%
1891	567	−1.13%
1896	546	−0.75%
1901	541	−0.18%

Year	Pop.	±% p.a.
1906	506	−1.33%
1911	487	−0.76%
1921	431	−1.21%
1926	363	−3.38%
1931	353	−0.56%
1936	349	−0.23%
1946	273	−2.43%
1954	287	+0.63%
1962	298	+0.47%
1968	279	−1.09%
1975	256	−1.22%
1982	277	+1.13%
1990	273	−0.18%
1999	309	+1.39%
2007	291	−0.75%
2012	303	+0.81%
2017	299	−0.27%
2023	330	+1.66%

Source: EHESS (1793–1999) and INSEE

== Sights ==
- Estate purchased for the Duke de Lorraine in 1562. Destroyed during the Thirty Years War.
- Château de Vintremont destroyed after 1842.

=== Religious buildings ===
- Church rebuilt in 1918

=== Civil buildings ===
- Town hall
- School

== See also ==
- Communes of the Meurthe-et-Moselle department
