= Adelphus =

10th bishop of Metz

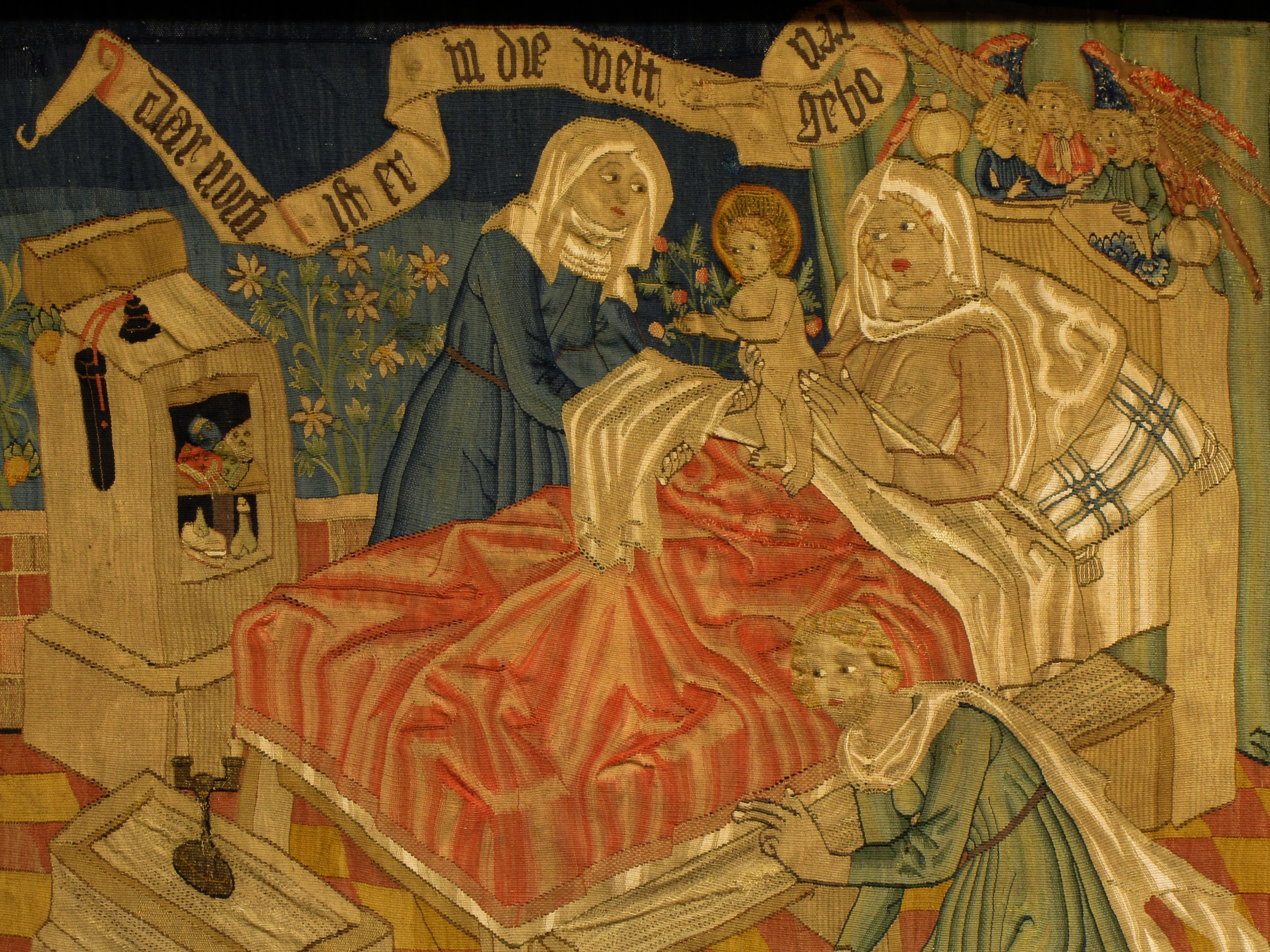
Scene from the life of Adelphus as depicted in the Adelphus tapestries from the 1470s

According to a historical catalogue inserted in the Drogo Sacramentary (folio 126), Adelphe (also known as Adelfus, Adelphus, Adelfius) is the 10th bishop of Metz. Most agree he lived in the fifth century. Louis the Pious moved his remains in the Abbey of Neuwiller-lès-Saverne, in 826. He was canonized on 3 December 1049 by Pope Leo IX. He is commemorated in the Roman Martyrology on 29 August.
