= Fountain of Neptune (Madrid) =

Fountain in Madrid, Spain

- Spanish: Fuente de Neptuno
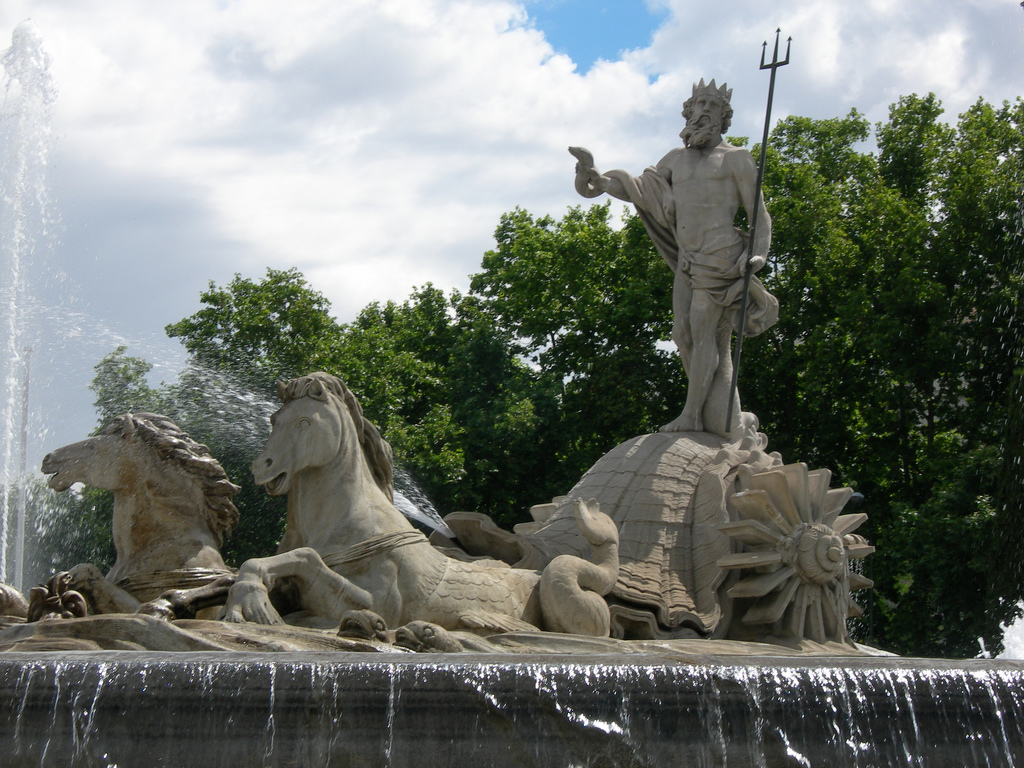
- View from the south
- Artist: Juan Pascual de Mena
- Year: 1781–1786
- Medium: White marble
- Movement: Neoclassicism
- Subject: Neptune
- Location: Plaza de Cánovas del Castillo, Madrid, Spain
- 40.415268°N 3.694153°W

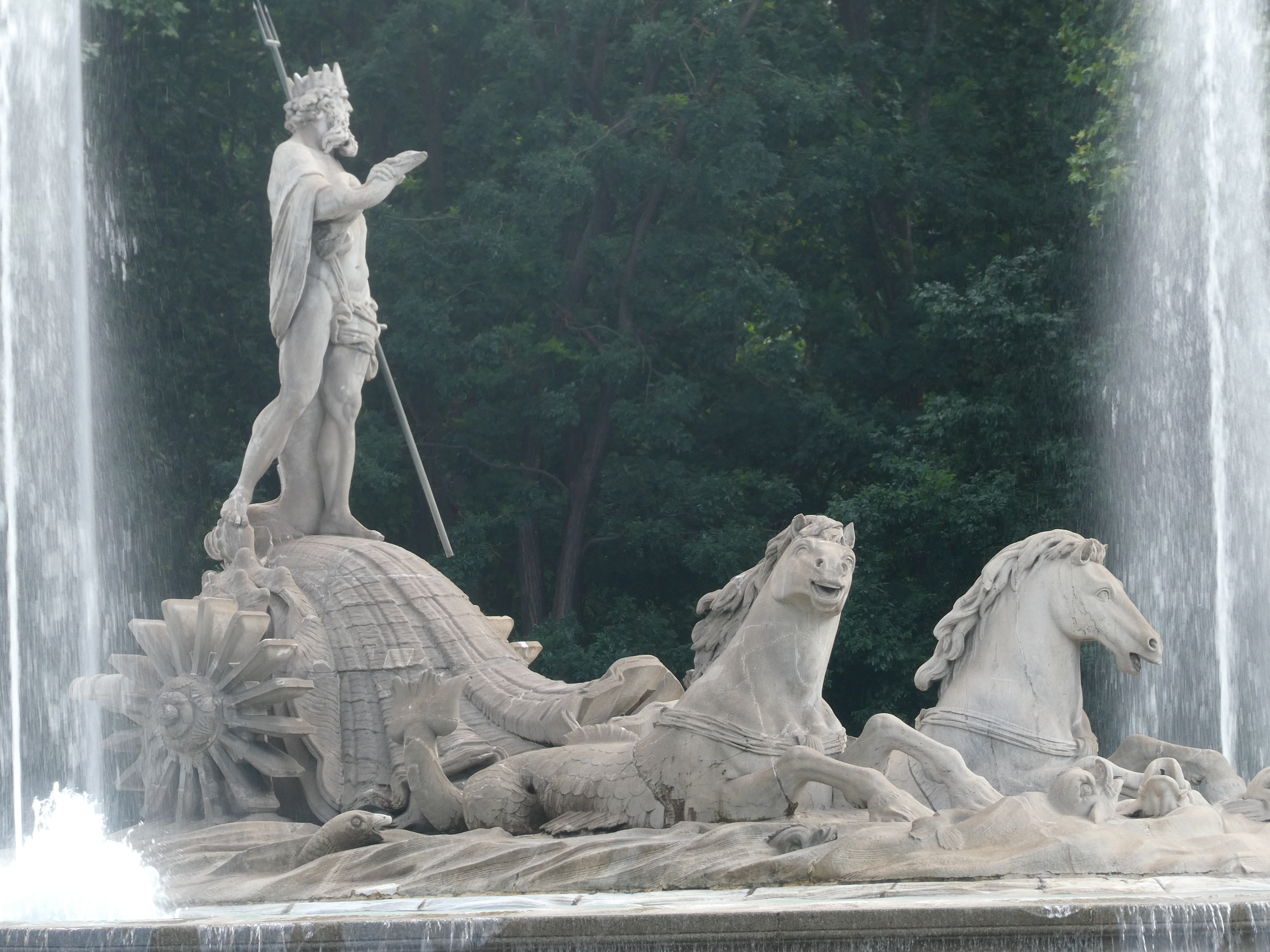
View from the north

The Fountain of Neptune (Spanish: Fuente de Neptuno) is a neoclassical fountain located in Madrid, Spain. It lies on the centre of the Plaza de Cánovas del Castillo, a roundabout in the Paseo del Prado. The sculptural group in its centre represents Neptune, a Roman water deity.

== History and description ==
Designed by Ventura Rodríguez, the sculpture—made of white marble from Montesclaros—was commissioned to Juan Pascual de Mena. Sculptural works began in 1781. Following the master's death in April 1784, the fountain was finished in October 1786 by his disciples.

The fountain is formed by a circular pylon with the sculptural group in its centre. The crowned Roman god wields a trident with one hand while he grabs a sea snake with the other hand.

It has a maximum water capacity of 305 m^{3}.

The fountain is also a site where Atlético Madrid supporters gather to celebrate the team's trophies, sometimes alongside players. When Atléti won La Liga in 2014 – their tenth league title overall but their first since 1996 – captain Gabi climbed the statue of Neptune and draped a club flag over the trident and a club scarf around the statue's head.
