= Carnegie Library of Reims =

Library building in Reims, France

- Bibliothèque Carnegie de Reims
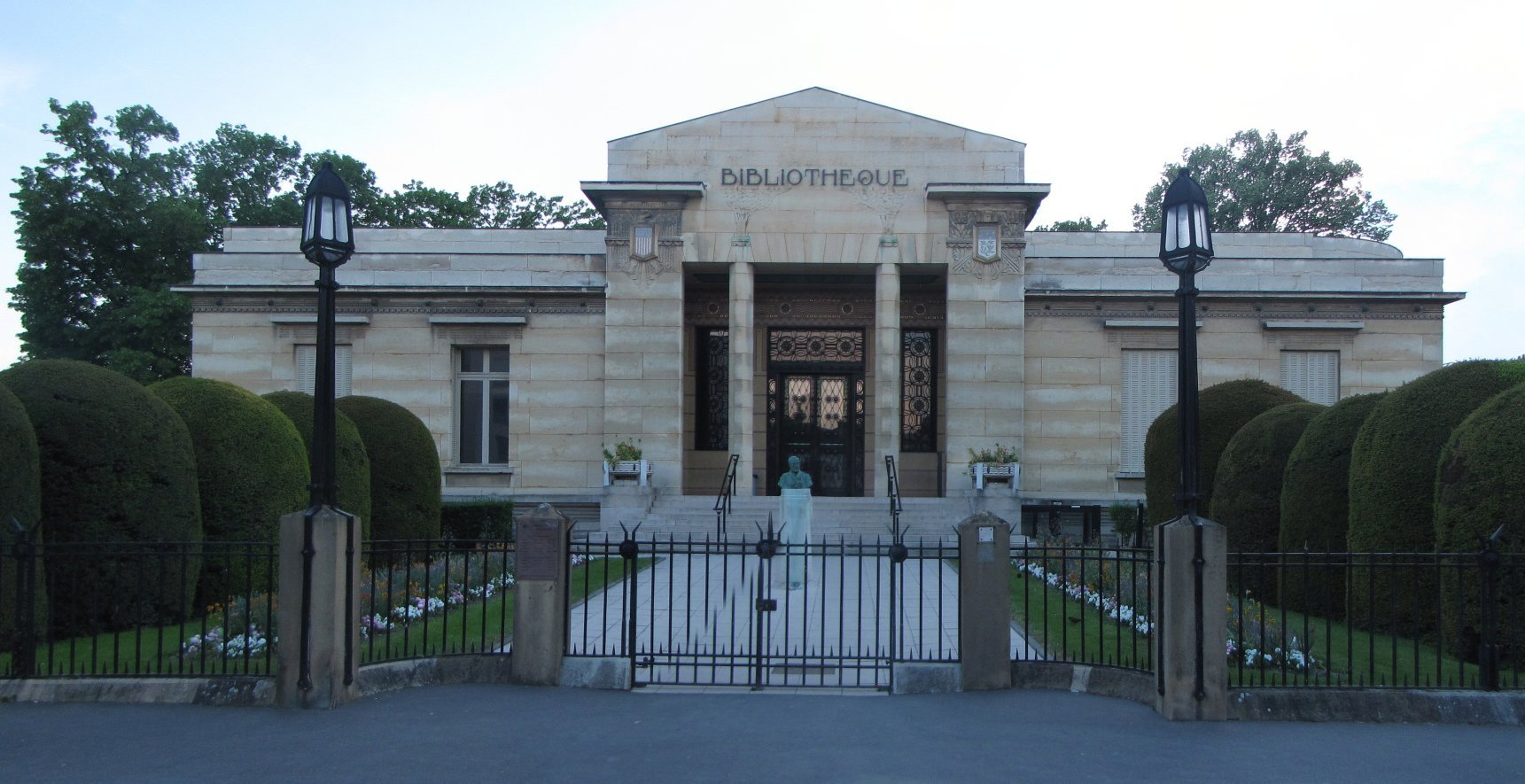
- Carnegie Library of Reims
- Interactive map of the Carnegie Library of Reims area

General information
- Type: Public library
- Architectural style: Art Deco
- Location: Reims, France
- Coordinates: 49°15′10.72″N 4°2′7.63″E
- Construction started: 1921
- Completed: 1927
- Inaugurated: 10 June 1928
- Renovated: 2004-2005
- Cost: US$200,000 (1920)
- Renovation cost: €5.4 million (2005)

Technical details
- Floor area: 4,100 m^{2} (44,000 sq ft)

Design and construction
- Architect: Max Sainsaulieu
- Other designers: Jacques Simon, Jacques Gruber, Madeleine Lacour, Henri Sauvage
- Awards: Gold Medal of the 1925 Exposition Internationale des Arts Décoratifs et Industriels Modernes

Renovating team
- Architects: Jacques Bléhaut, Jean-Loup Roubert

Website
- www.bm-reims.fr

The Carnegie Library of Reims (French: Bibliothèque Carnegie de Reims) is a public library built with money donated by businessman and philanthropist Andrew Carnegie to the city of Reims after World War I. Reims was one of three "front-line" cities to be given a Carnegie library, the other two being Leuven and Belgrade (Belgrade University Library). Built in the 1920s, it combined the mission of heritage conservation and of reading public library. Until 2003, the Carnegie Library was the main library of Reims.

The Art Deco decor of the Carnegie Library, the harmony of its proportions, the elegance of its architecture made it worthy of inclusion in the French inventory of Monuments historiques.

== History ==
The municipal library of Reims was founded in the late eighteenth century with the books belonging to religious orders. In 1764, following the Suppression of the Society of Jesus in France, the books of Reims Jesuit College were confiscated. During the French Revolution, libraries of Reims abbeys and of the chapter of the Cathedral of Reims were also confiscated and added to the collections of Reims public library. The collections were first installed on the first floor of City Hall, where a small reading room opened to the public in 1818.

The First World War marked a profound break in the history of the library. On May 3, 1917, an incendiary shell destroyed the town hall and a large part of the collections. The most valuable works (nearly 100 000 documents) were put away before the War and thus preserved from any damage. In 1918, the city of Reims was devastated. The municipality could not afford to finance the rebuilding of the public library without the Carnegie Endowment for International Peace .

Founded in 1910 by philanthropist Andrew Carnegie, the Carnegie Endowment for International Peace decided after the World War 1 to provide a library to the cities particularly battered by bombings. In France, the city of Reims was chosen to be given a Carnegie library. The Carnegie Endowment offered the city of Reims a sum of US$200 000 (more of 3 million francs at the time) to build the new library.

The construction of the Carnegie Library was entrusted to French architect Max Sainsaulieu (1870–1953). Upon receipt of the order of construction in December 1920, Sainsaulieu undertook a study trip to visit foreign libraries in Switzerland and Belgium. Under the influence of his son Louis, Sainsaulieu reshuffles his first project (initially very classical), opting for the modern look Art Deco style.

Started in 1921, the Art Deco building was finished in 1927. It officially opened to public on June 10, 1928, in the presence of French President Gaston Doumergue and the US ambassador Myron Timothy Herrick. The library stock includes some material which survived the First World War.

== Architecture ==
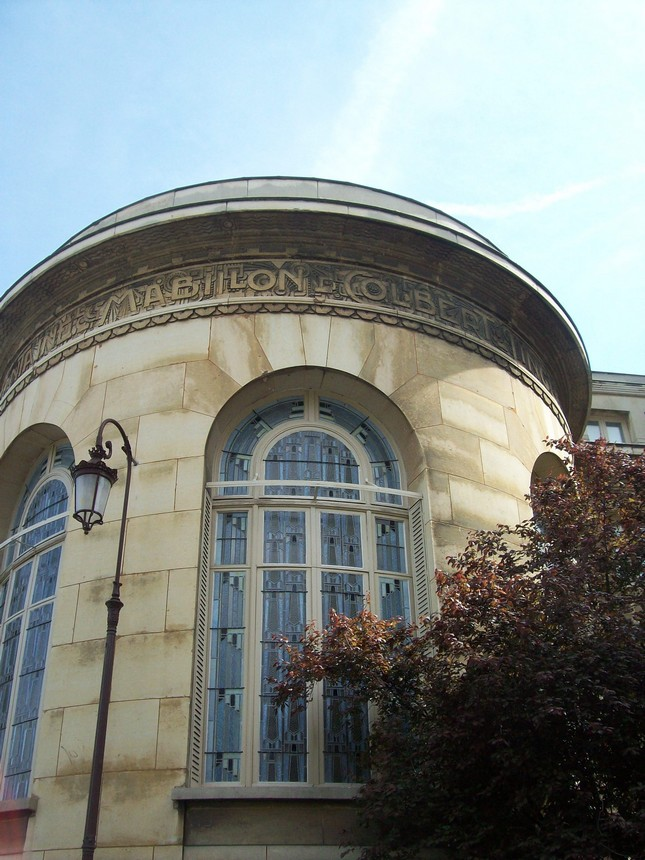
Window detail

The Carnegie library of Reims, remarkable for the quality of materials and luxurious ornamentation, boast a very functional space design, rare in France at that time. A strict distinction is made between public spaces, storage areas and work spaces for staff. The semi-circular shape of the book stacks is rather unusual. It allows storage of almost 400 000 books on five levels. In front of these stacks are the reading room and administrative offices.

Sainsaulieu designed the library as a temple dedicated to knowledge. The visitor enters the building by climbing a few stairs, symbolizing his elevation to knowledge. Two vases executed by the Manufacture nationale de Sèvres adorn the platform steps.

At the entrance, two pilasters without capitals are surmounted by a classicist pediment decorated with engraved flowering shrubs and marked with the iron letters of the word "Bibliothèque" (English: library). The engraved motto of the library reads in Latin "Educunt fructum folia" (English: flowers lead to fruit). Symbolizing the flowering of mind, this bas-relief was made by French sculptor Edouard Sediey. The façade, decorated with mosaics executed by Biret, is pierced by a large wrought iron gate made by Schwartz-Haumont. The entire porch was presented at the 1925 Exposition Internationale des Arts Décoratifs et Industriels Modernes and won a gold medal.

The lobby is 10 by 10 metres (33 ft × 33 ft) and is topped with a cupola with four sides that ended in an art deco lantern pendant designed by the master glass maker Jacques Simon in Reims. Under the pendant, in the center of the lobby, a fountain symbolizes, according to Sainsaulieu, the "source of all science and knowledge". The walls are lined with large panels of Algerian onyx, framed by bands of green marble. Twenty marble mosaics made from cartoons by Henri Sauvage are inserted in the panels and representing the intellectual, physical or manual activities.

The reading room, with its oak floors and mahogany-paneled walls, exudes a calm atmosphere contributing to study. The interior of the reading room consists of shelving wall interrupted by a gallery on the first floor. The light comes mainly from a large glass ceiling due to Jacques Gruber, famous master glassmaker of Nancy, representing an open book on the arms of the City of Reims. The three large windows that adorn this room have a geometric design using frosted glass, cut and worked to get an impression of relief.

== Restoration ==
In 2001, the City of Reims entrusted the renovation of the library to French architects Jacques Bléhaut and Jean-Loup Roubert. Priority was given to bringing the building up to standards, in terms of accessibility and safety, while respecting the original spirit of the place. The renovation aimed also at improving as much as possible the conditions of conservation of collections, with the installation of air conditioning in the book stacks. In the areas accessible to the public, the restoration was also an opportunity to improve the comfort of the readers and offer them new activity areas (conference room, educational workshop), located at the ground-garden. This transformation was made possible with the move in 2002 of the municipal archives, located since 1928 in the building. Great care was also given to the restoration of decorative elements: marble, stained glass, ironwork, and woodwork. The library reopened to the public in June 2005.

== Gallery ==
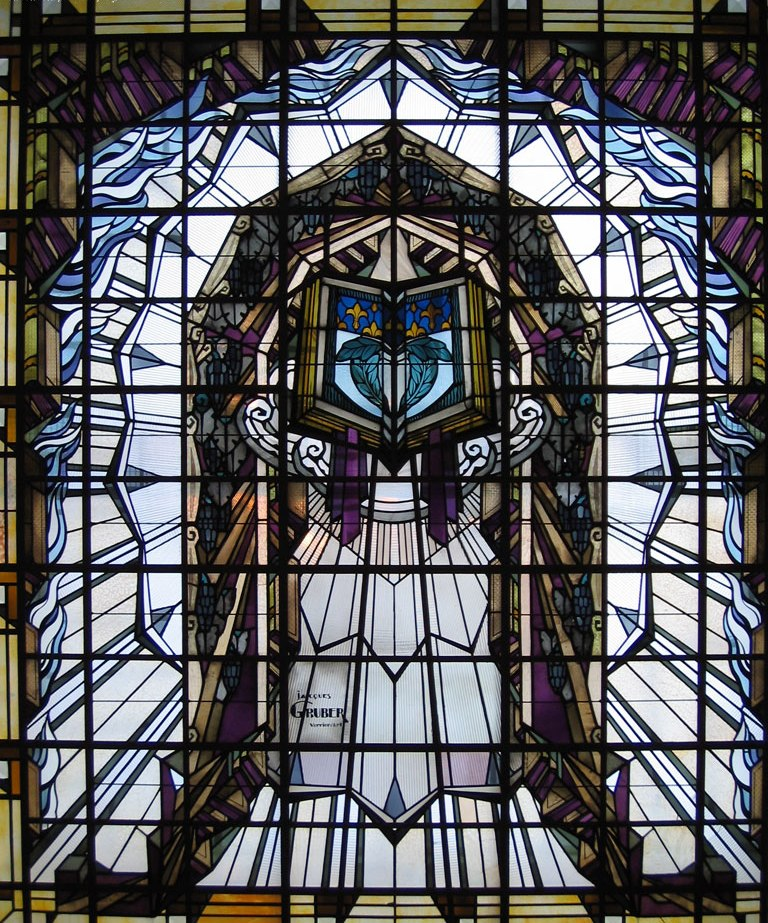
Art Deco stained glass in the reading room by Jacques Gruber.

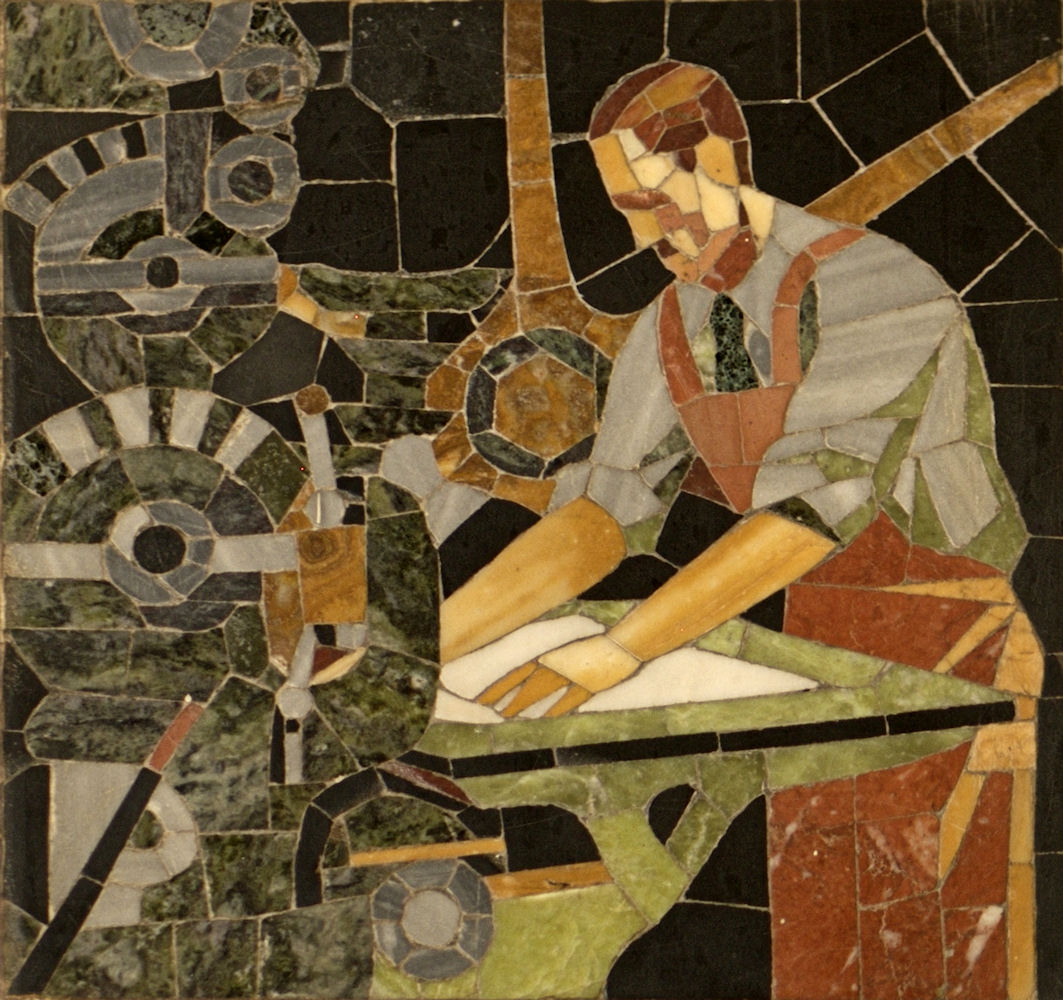
Detail of the mosaics in the entrance hall according to drawings by Henri Sauvage.

== See also ==
- List of libraries in France

== See also ==
- Andrew Carnegie
- Carnegie library
- List of Carnegie libraries in Europe
