= Paul Boeswillwald =

French architect and art historian (1844-1931)

Paul Louis Boeswillwald (October 22, 1844, in Paris – July 17, 1931, in Paris) was a French architect and art historian.

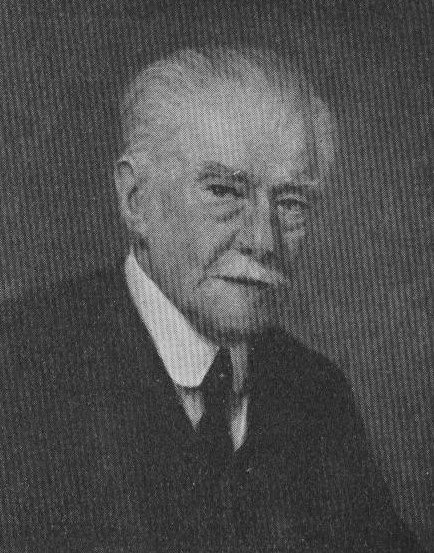
Paul Boeswillwald

== Biography ==
Son of the architect Émile Boeswillwald and father of the painter Émile Artus Boeswillwald, he was a pupil of his father and Charles Laisné and collaborated with Eugène Viollet-le-Duc on the restoration of the ramparts of the historic Fortified City of Carcassonne since 1879.

Like his father, he was an inspector of historical monuments. He succeeded his father in the restoration of the Saint-Étienne cathedral in Toul. He was also a professor and had as students Max Sainsaulieu and Paul Vorin.

A diocesan architect of Bourges, he joined the commission for historical monuments on March 26, 1885, was appointed inspector general on December 21, 1895, to replace his father, and retired on February 11, 1929.

== Restorations ==
- Historic fortified city of Carcassonne, in collaboration with Eugène Viollet-le-Duc;
- Saint-Étienne Cathedral in Toul and Saint-Gengoult Collegiate Church, restored after the death of his father, Émile Boeswillwald;
- Collegiate Church of Saint-Gengoult in Toul and its cloister;
- tower and bridge of Orthez;

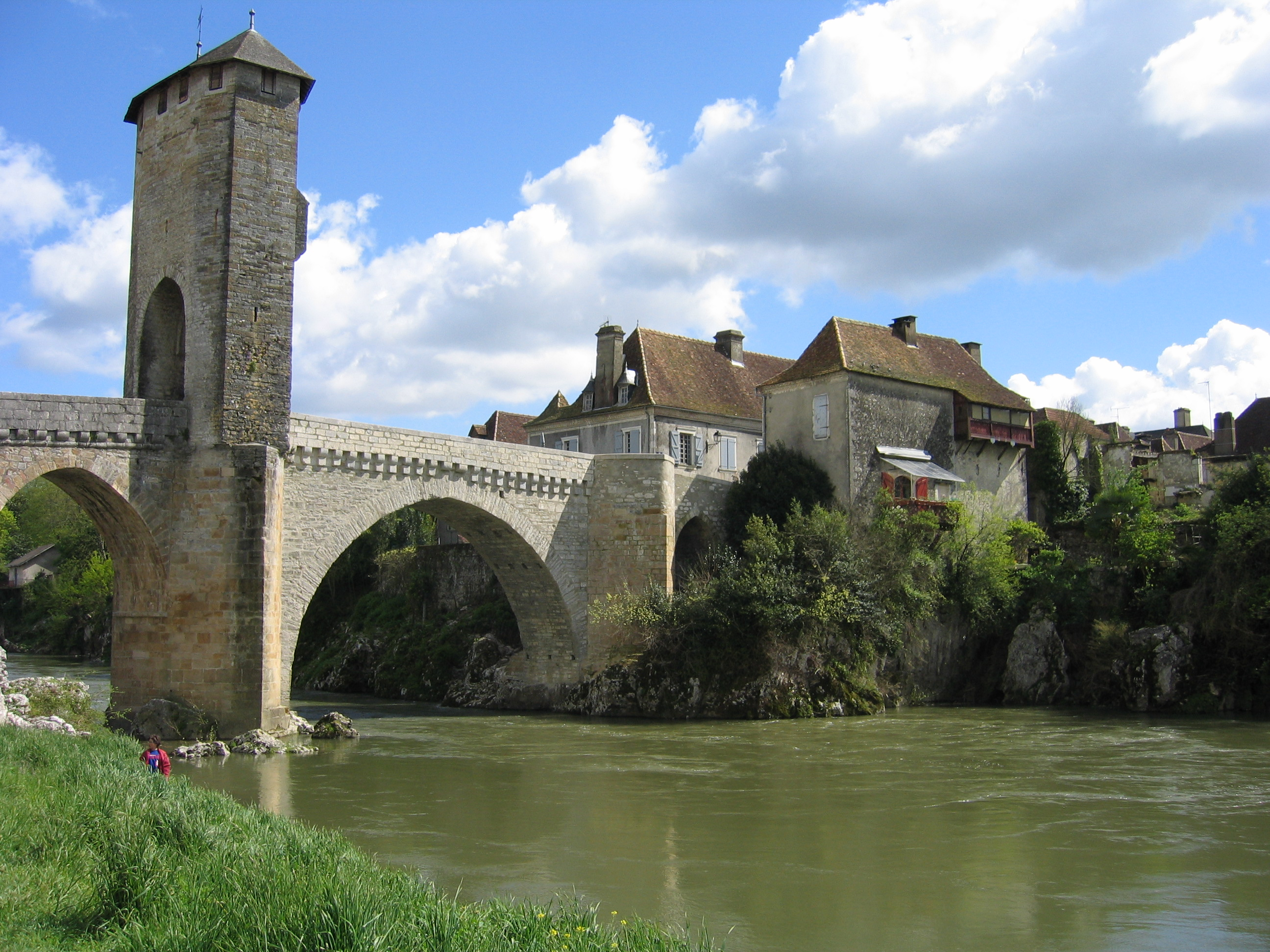
The fortified bridge of Orthez

- ramparts of Guérande;
- Saint-Père-sous-Vézelay;
- Castle of Foix;
- Church of Saint Eliphe of Rampillon;
- church of Appoigny;
- Abbey of the Trinity of Vendôme;
- monuments at Bourges;
- former Notre-Dame de Laon cathedral after the death of Louis Sauvageot in 1907;
- Hôtel de Cluny;
- Sainte-Chapelle.

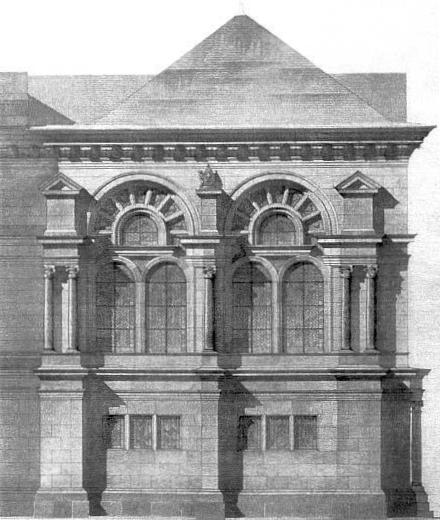
Chapel of the Bishops of Toul by Paul Boeswillwald (1877)

== Iconography ==
His son portrayed him in 1895. This work exhibited at the Salon of French Artists in 1895 was donated, in 1982, to the museum of Nogent-sur-Seine.

== Bibliography ==
- Le service des Monuments historiques. Son histoire: organisation, administration, législation (1830-1934), M.Paul Verdier. in: Congrès archéologique de France XCVIII session, A. Picard, Paris, 1936.
- Frédéric Haeusser, Christian Wolff et Patrick Cabanel, Boeswillwald, famille d'architectes, in Patrick Cabanel et André Encrevé (dir.), Dictionnaire biographique des protestants français de 1787 à nos jours, tome 1 : A-C, Les Éditions de Paris Max Chaleil, Paris, 2015, pp. 338–339 ISBN 978-2846211901
