= Émile Boeswillwald =

French architect (1815–1896)

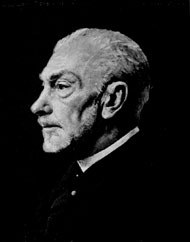
- 1890 painting of Boeswillwald by Léon Bonnat
- Born: 2 February 1815; Strasbourg
- Died: 20 March 1896 (aged 81); Paris, France
- Occupation: Architect
- Known for: Inspector General of Historic Monuments

Émile Boeswillwald (2 February 1815 – 20 March 1896) was a French architect. He succeeded Prosper Mérimée as Inspector General of Historic Monuments and collaborated with Eugène Viollet-le-Duc.

== Life ==
Emile Boeswillwald was born in Strasbourg on 2 February 1815. He learned the trade of stonemason, continuing his apprenticeship in Munich in 1836. He then studied architecture in the workshop of Henri Labrouste and at the École des Beaux-Arts in 1837.

Boeswillwald exhibited at the Salons of 1839, 1841, 1842, 1844 and 1855. In 1860 he was appointed inspector general of historical monuments. He thus became a member of the committee on historical monuments and the Council of Civil Buildings. In 1864 land was purchased beside the Villa Eugénie in Biarritz on which to erect a chapel designed by Boeswillwald. The chapel, dedicated to Our Lady of Guadeloupe, was consecrated in September 1865. It incorporated an eclectic mix of Roman and Byzantine art with Hispano-Moorish elements from Seville and Granada. It was painted by Alexandre-Dominique Denuelle and Louis Steinheil.

Boeswillwald produced a series of watercolor drawings of the soldiers of the First Empire in the years 1890–1891. The painter Léon Bonnat represented his friend in 1890. Emile Boeswillwald died in Paris on 20 March 1896. His son, Paul Boeswillwald, was also an architect. His grandson Émile Artus Boeswillwald was a painter.

== Work ==
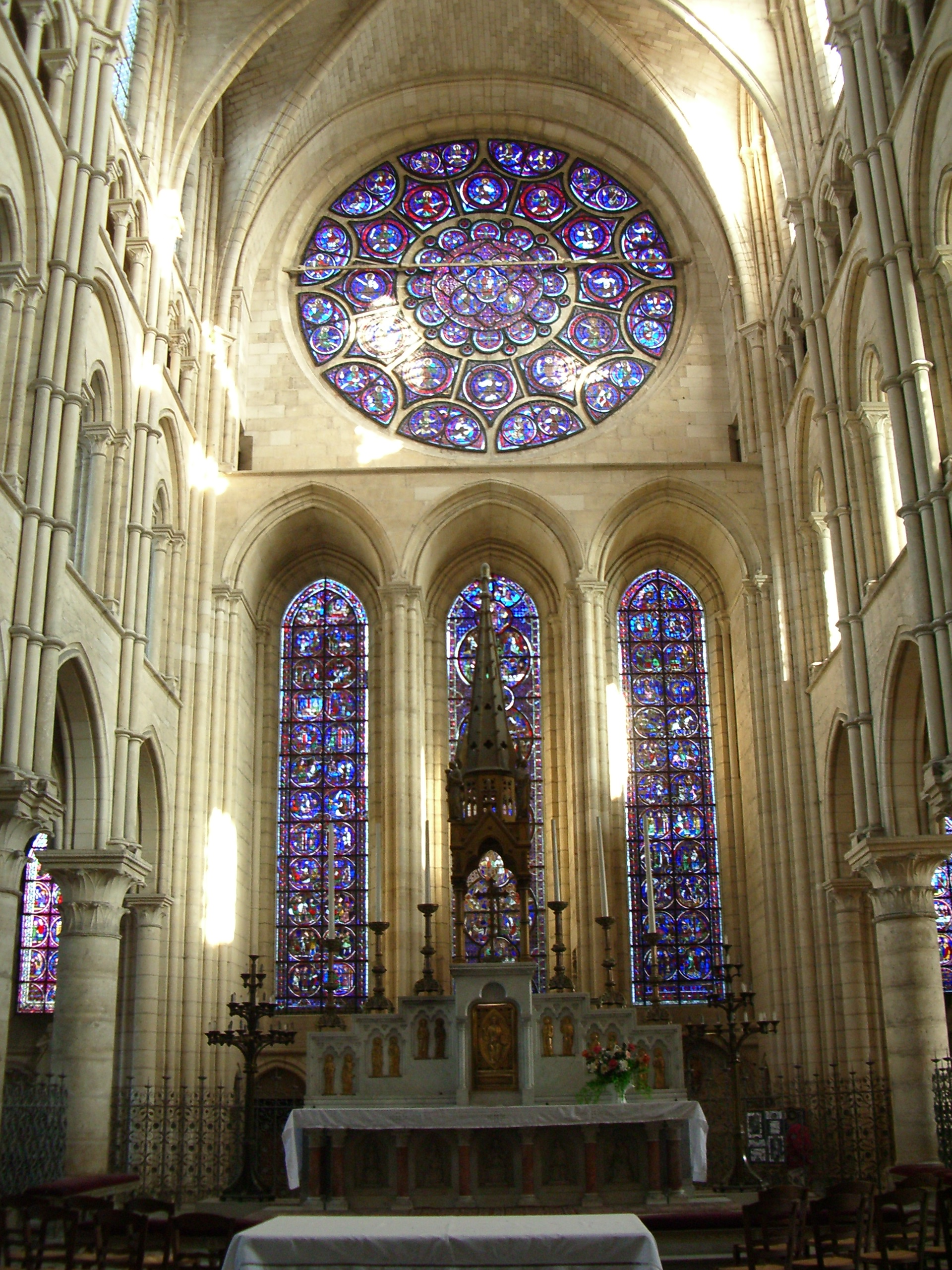
Interior of the Laon Cathedral

- Restoration of the Abbatial church of Notre-Dame de Mouzon
- Transformation of Château de Pontchartrain for the family of Auguste Dreyfus
- Restoration of the Cathédrale Saint-Étienne de Toul, which his son, Paul, continued
- Restoration of the church of Vignory
- Restoration of the Abbey of Saint-Germer-de-Fly
- Restoration of Notre-Dame Cathedral in Laon
- Restoration of the Sainte-Chapelle
- Restoration of Église Saint-Pierre-et-Saint-Paul, Neuwiller-lès-Saverne
- Design of the restoration for the Sainte-Croix de Quimperlé Abbey
- Complete design of Xifré Downing Palace. Madrid. Spain.

== Awards ==
- Second-class medal at the Salon of 1849
- Knight of the Legion of Honor in 1853
- Officer of the Legion of Honor in 1865
- Commander of the Legion of Honor in 1889

== Bibliography ==
- Co-author with René Cagnat and Albert Ballu: Timgad, une cité africaine sous l'Empire romain, Paris, 1895–1905, E. Leroux, (available on Gallica).
