= Juan Pascual de Mena =

Spanish sculptor

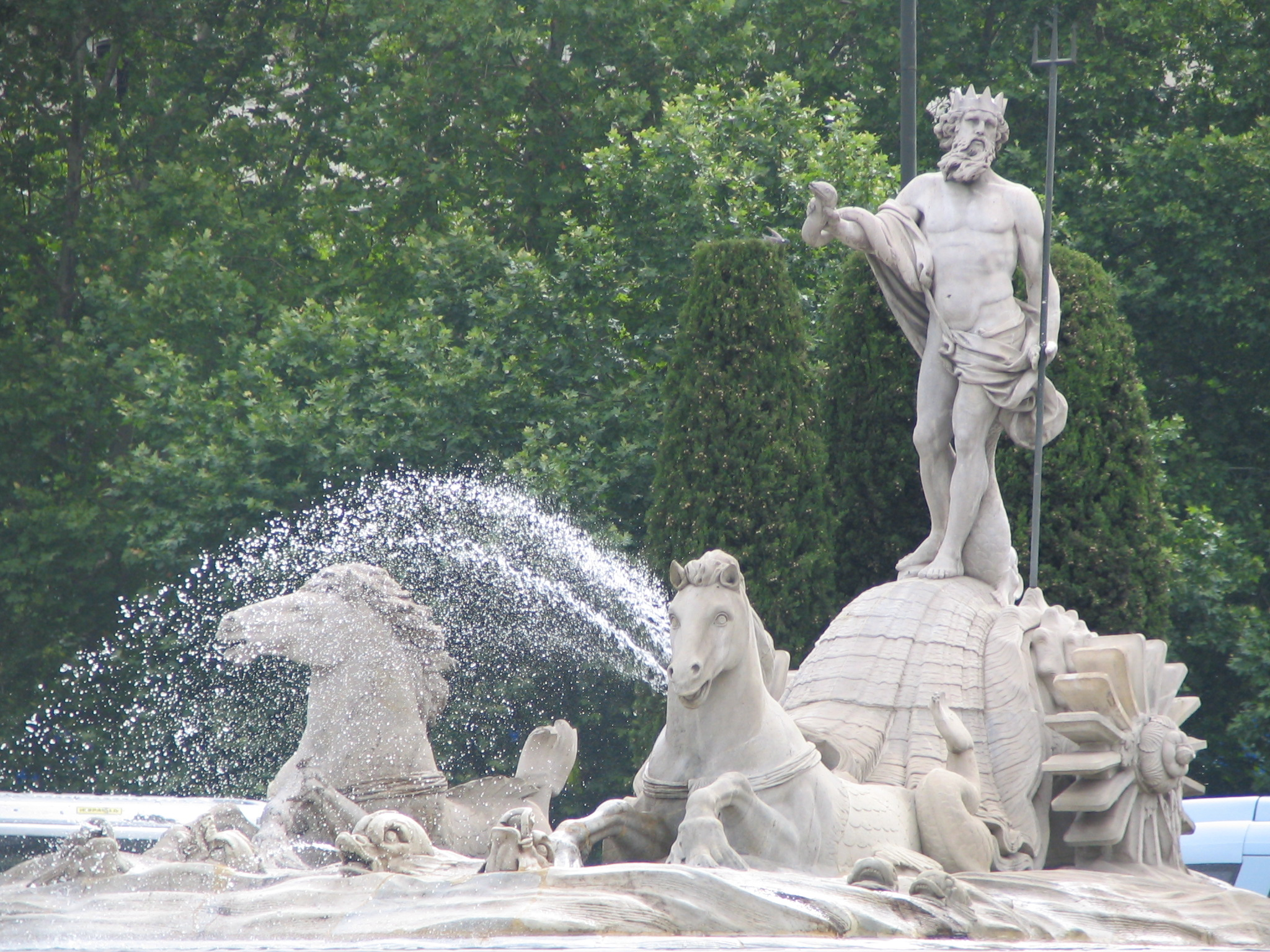
The Fountain of Neptune

Juan Pascual de Mena (1707 in Villaseca de la Sagra – 16 April 1784, in Madrid) was a Spanish sculptor known for his work in the Neoclassical style.

== Life and work ==
At the age of five, his family relocated to Madrid. He began his studies there and soon established connections with foreign sculptors, primarily French, who were involved in decorating the Royal buildings. He was also exposed to new styles originating in Italy, particularly through the work of Spaniards studying in Rome, such as Felipe de Castro. However, it is not known with whom he studied. In 1730, he married Josefa Fernández Pellido.

He contributed to the planning of the Real Academia de Bellas Artes de San Fernando. Upon its opening in 1752, he was appointed lieutenant-director and later became the director of sculpture in 1762. In 1765, his wife died, leaving him with a young daughter. Three months later, he married Juliana Pérez. In 1771, he was appointed general director of the academia. In 1768, he was named an Academician of Merit at the Real Academia de Bellas Artes de San Carlos.

He was highly prolific. His most notable marble sculpture is the Fountain of Neptune, designed by Ventura Rodríguez. He also created a notable bust of King Charles III, along with several statues of previous kings for the Royal Palace of Madrid. Additionally, he provided numerous religious figures for institutions such as the Church of San Jerónimo el Real, the Church of San Marcos, and the Church of San Martín in Torrecilla en Cameros. As one of his final works, he contributed to the decoration of the altar at Toledo Cathedral. However, distinguishing his specific contributions from those of other artists involved has proven challenging. The project remained unfinished at the time of his death.

He also worked in wood. Many of his works have been incorrectly attributed to his contemporary, Luis Salvador Carmona. This issue is further complicated by the fact that few of his works are dated.

== Sources ==
- F. Sánchez Cantón, "Escultura y pintura del siglo XVIII", in Ars XVII, 1965.
- M. E. Gómez Moreno, Breve historia de la escultura española, Imprenta de Blass, 1951.
