= Paseo del Prado =

- Paseo del Prado (Spanish)
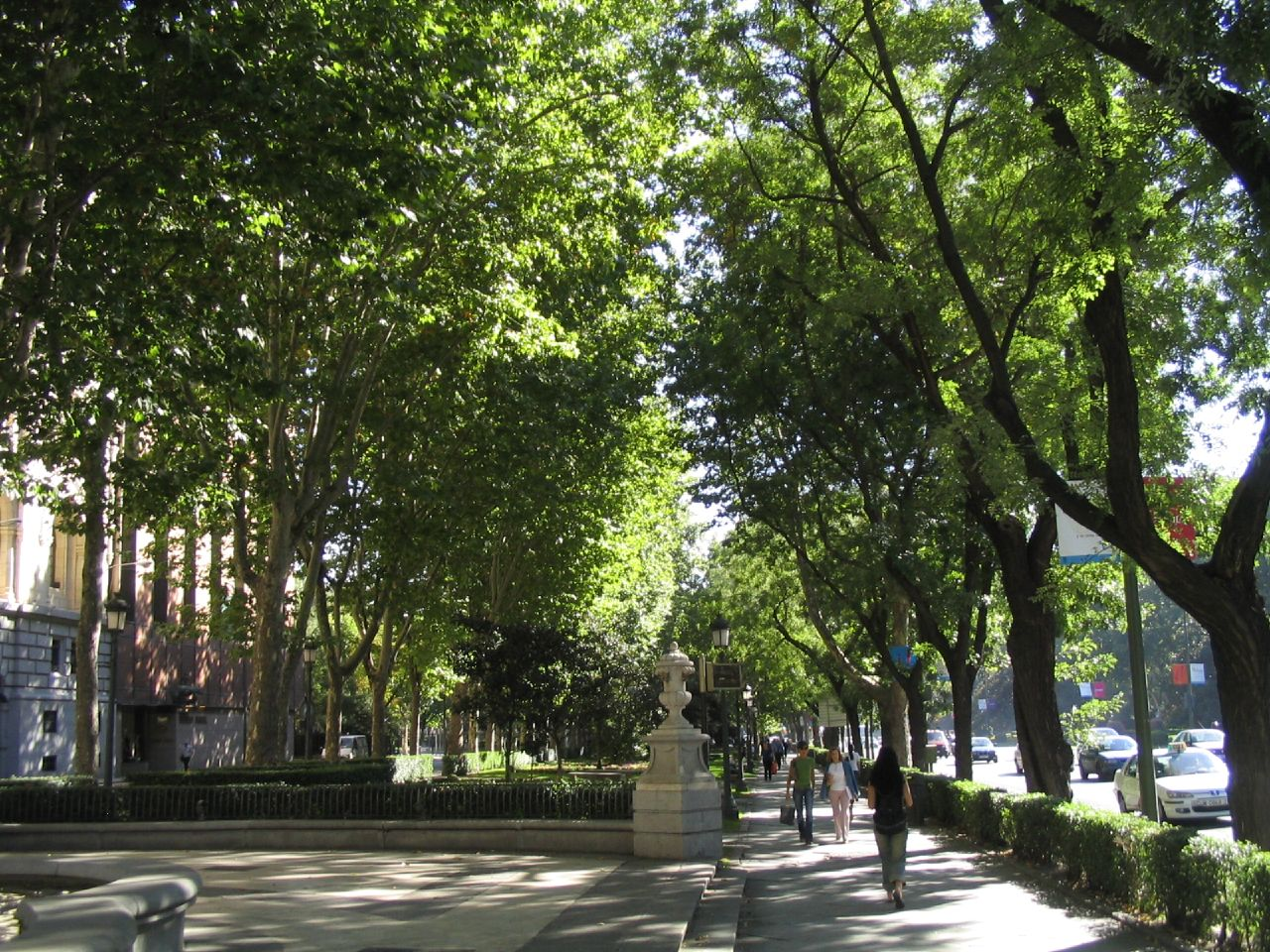

- Location within Spain
- 40.414061°N 3.693688°W
- Location: Madrid, Spain

UNESCO World Heritage Site
- Type: Cultural
- Criteria: ii, iv, vi
- Designated: 2021 (44th session)
- Part of: Paseo del Prado and Buen Retiro, a landscape of Arts and Sciences
- Reference no.: 1618
- Region: Europe and North America

Spanish Cultural Heritage
- Official name: Paseo del Prado
- Type: Non-movable
- Criteria: Monument
- Designated: 1999
- Reference no.: RI-51-0004725

The Paseo del Prado is one of the main boulevards in Madrid, Spain. It runs north–south between the Plaza de Cibeles and the Plaza del Emperador Carlos V (also known as Plaza de Atocha), with the Plaza de Cánovas del Castillo (the location of the Fuente de Neptuno, and of the Ritz and Palace five-star hotels) lying approximately in the middle. The Paseo del Prado forms the southern end of the city's central axis (which continues to the north of Cibeles as the Paseo de Recoletos, and further north as the Paseo de la Castellana). It enjoys the status of Bien de Interés Cultural (BIC), and as part of a combined UNESCO World Heritage Site with Buen Retiro Park.

== Etymology ==
Paseo del Prado takes its name from what was once the Prado de los Jerónimos, a group of fields surrounding the Monastery of San Jerónimo El Real, upon which the boulevard was built.

== Description ==
This densely tree-lined, wide and central avenue is a landmark for the city residents and the location of important cultural and tourist spots in the city, including the so-called Golden Triangle of Art, which encompasses three museums: the Prado Museum (with highlights such as Diego Velázquez's Las Meninas and Francisco de Goya's La maja vestida and La maja desnuda), the Thyssen-Bornemisza Museum (housing a collection that spans eight centuries of European painting), and the Reina Sofia Museum (where Pablo Picasso's Guernica hangs, among a collection of 20th-century art). In the vicinity are the Parque del Buen Retiro, the Casón del Buen Retiro (hosting the 19th-century collection of the Prado Museum), CaixaForum Madrid, the headquarters of the Real Academia Española (the Spanish language academy), the Bolsa de Madrid (the city's stock exchange), and the Congreso de los Diputados (the national congress).

The Paseo del Prado boulevard includes several monuments and enclosures that are of historical and artistic interest, erected in the eighteenth century for the Hall of Prado urban project. Numerous ornamental and landscaping grounds were constructed for this project. The highlights of this project include the Villanueva Building (the Prado Museum's main building), the Royal Botanical Gardens and three sculptural water fountains designed by Ventura Rodriguez, depicting Neptune, Cibeles and Apollo.

A controversial project of thorough reform and revitalization of the Paseo del Prado and the Paseo de Recoletos, known as Plan Especial Recoletos-Prado and authored by an international team of architects led by Álvaro Siza, was approved by the city council on 23 June 2005, but as of December 2010 its environmental impact study is still underway and reconstruction has not been initiated.

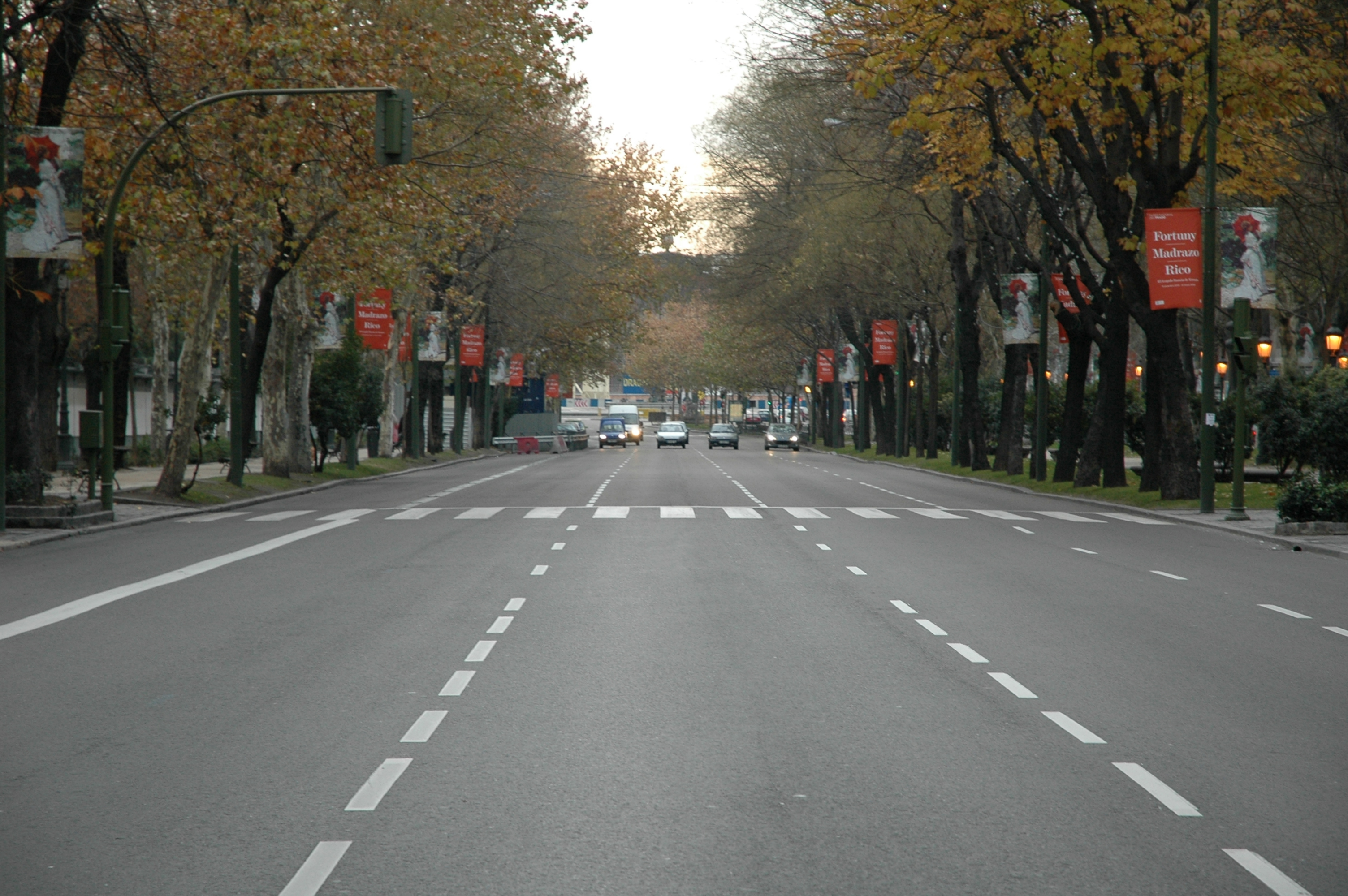
Paseo del Prado, Madrid

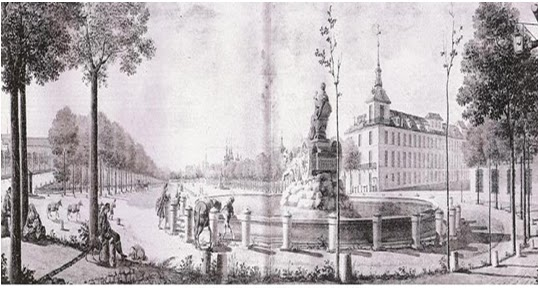
Paseo del Prado with Palacio de los Alcañices

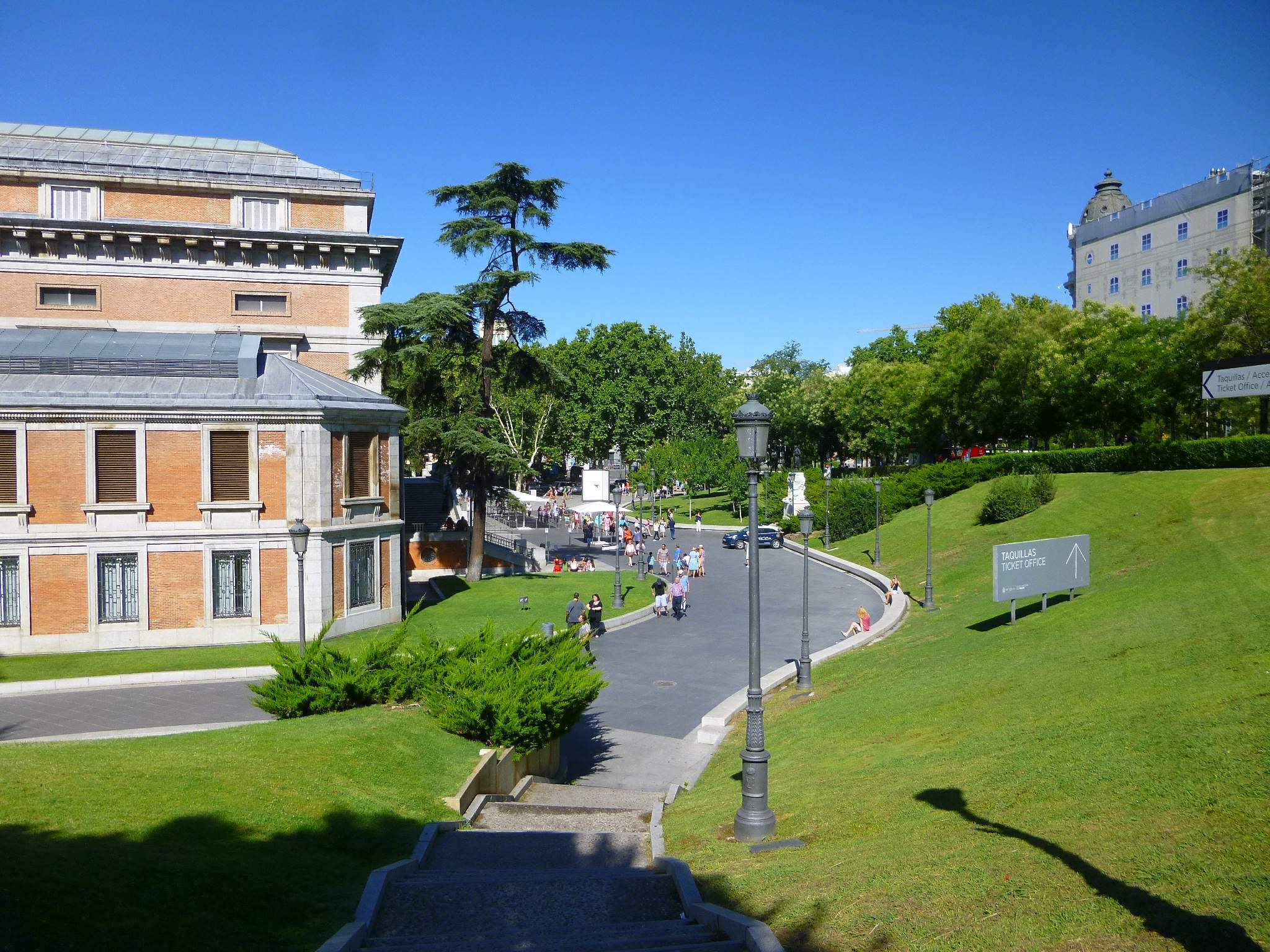
Museo del Prado

== Notable structures ==
- Fountain of Apollo
- CaixaForum Madrid
- Casa Sindical
- Plaza de Cibeles
- Fountain of Cybele
- Cuatro Fuentes
- Cuesta de Moyano
- Bank of Spain building
- Edificio Villanueva del Museo del Prado
- Banco de España metro station
- Fountain of Neptuno
- Monument to Eugenio d'Ors
- Museo Naval
- Hotel Palace
- Palacio de Comunicaciones
- Palacio de Villahermosa
- Palacio de Xifré
- Plaza de la Lealtad
- Plaza de la Platería de Martínez
- Puerta Real
- Real Fábrica de Platería Martínez
- Real Jardín Botánico
- Hotel Ritz
- Statue of Velázquez
- Teatro del Buen Retiro
- Torrecilla de la Música
