= Constant Moyaux =

French architect

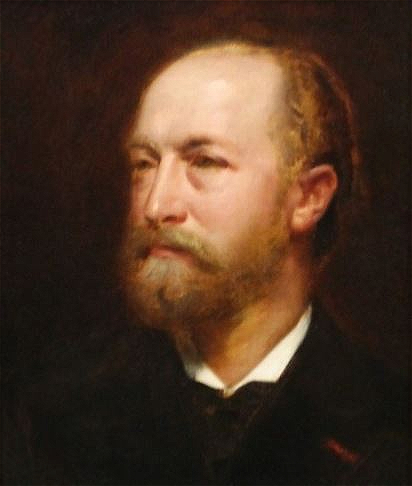
Constant Moyaux, by Édouard Sain (1881)

Constant Moyaux (15 June 1835, Anzin - 11 October 1911, Paris) was a French architect.

== Biography ==
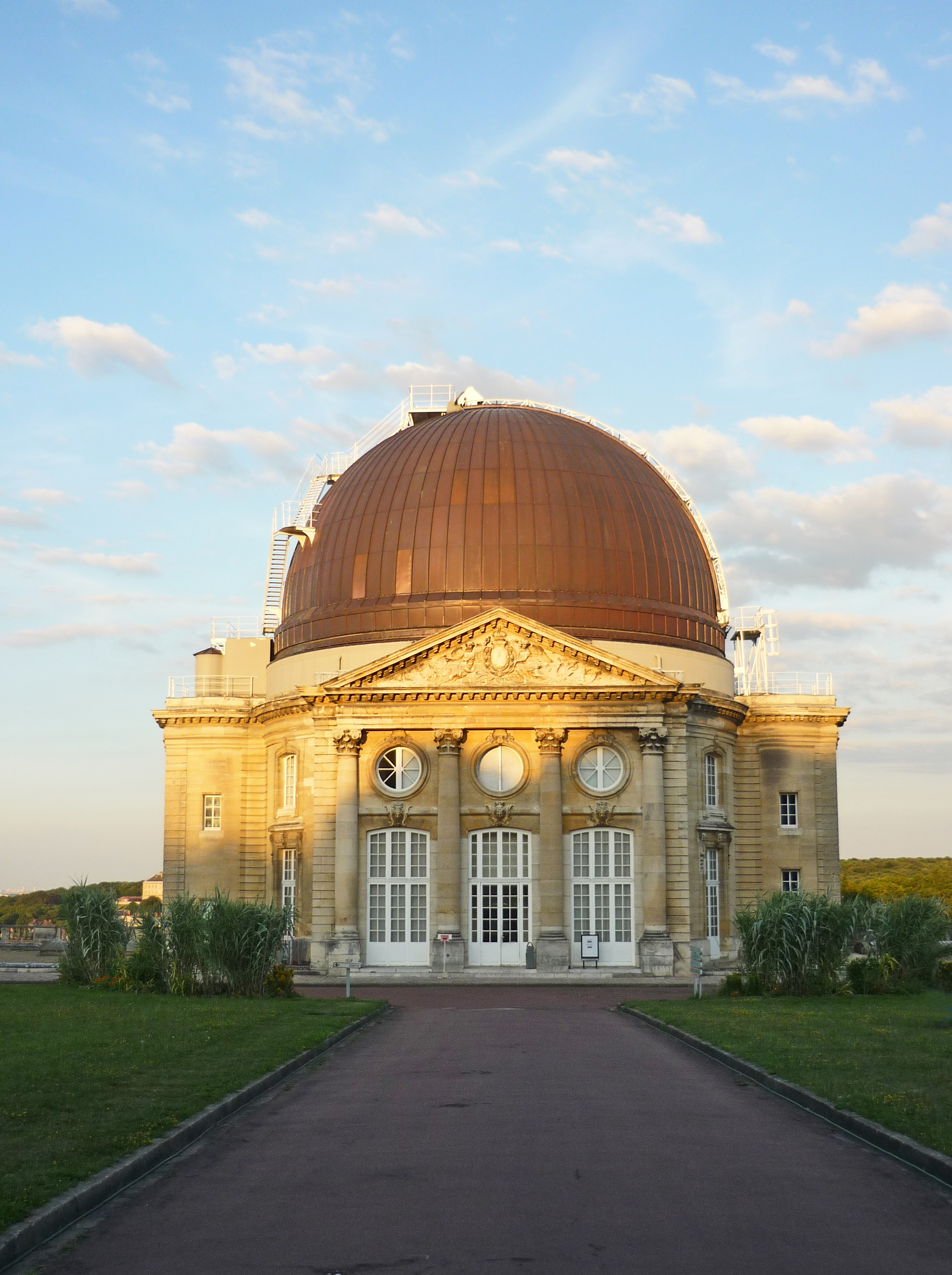
The observatory at Meudon

He was the son of a carpenter. He began studying architecture in 1852, at the academy in Valenciennes, then went to Paris, where he enrolled at the École des Beaux-Arts. His primary instructor there was Louis-Hippolyte Lebas. Over the course of the late 1850s, he won several medals and awards. He was the second student to receive the "Prix de Rougevin" (1857); established by the architect Auguste Rougevin (1794-1878), in memory of his son, who had died while studying there.

In 1861 his honors culminated, when he won the Prix de Rome, with his design for a thermal bathing establishment. From 1862 to 1866, he was at the Villa Medici in Rome, but also travelled extensively; throughout Italy as well as to Athens and Istanbul.

When he returned to Paris, he served as an inspector of civil buildings and national palaces from 1867 to 1874. The following year he was named a professor, and appointed as head of the architecture studio at the École; a position he held until his retirement in 1908. His students there included Max Sainsaulieu, Louis Duthoit, and Adolphe Dervaux.

In 1879, he was made a Knight in the Legion of Honor. He began one of his major works that same year; converting the fire-damaged Château Neuf at Meudon into an observatory. This project would occupy him until 1888. He also performed a major renovation at the Ministry of the Interior from 1882 to 1883. An appointment as Inspector General of Civil Buildings came in 1894. Four years later, he was elected to the Académie des Beaux-Arts, where he took Seat #4 for architecture, succeeding Charles Garnier (deceased).

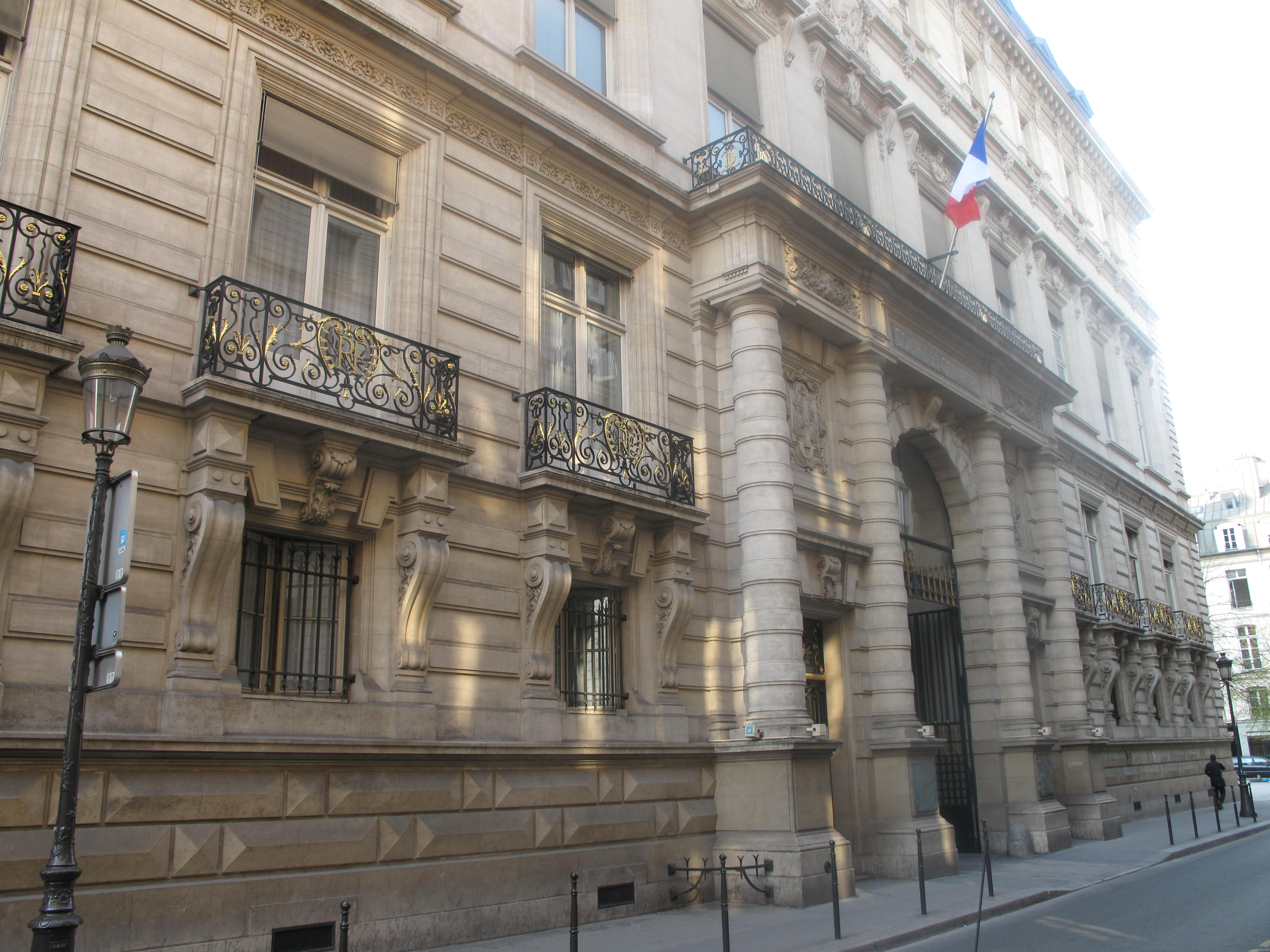
Headquarters of the Cour des Comptes, from a plan by Moyaux; completed after his death.

While attending festivities in his honor, in Anzin, he fell and skinned his head. The wound became infected, and he died of tetanus while undergoing treatment at the Institut Pasteur. His books and papers were bequeathed to the library in Anzin. The Musée des Beaux-Arts de Lille maintains a collection of his drawings.
