= Palacio de Xifré =

Palace in Madrid

Coordinates: 40.4134°N 3.6942°W

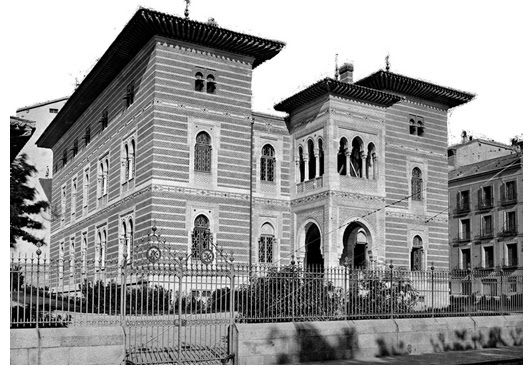
Facade of the Palacio de Xifré

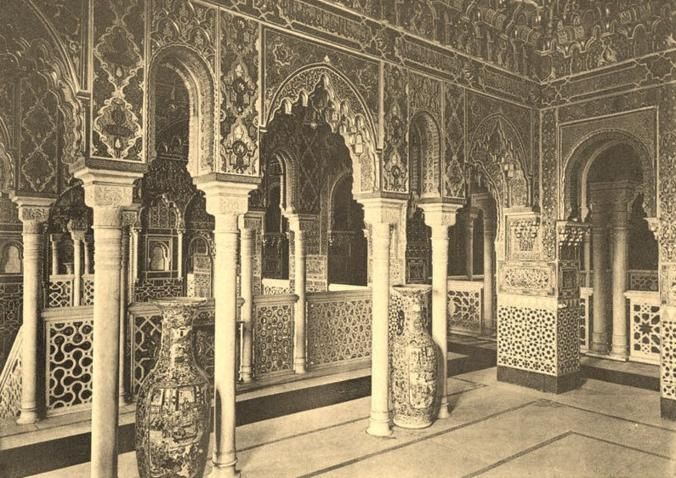
Palacio de Xifré

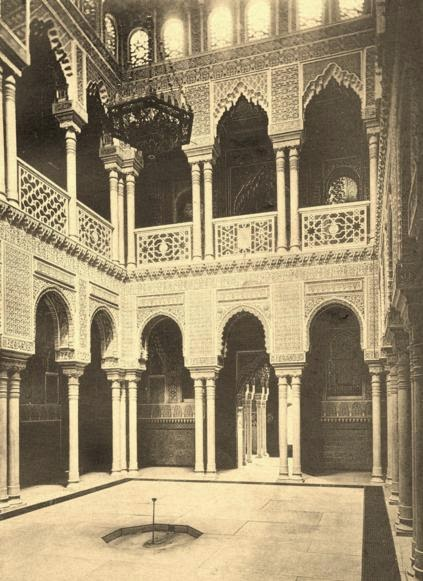
Palacio de Xifré

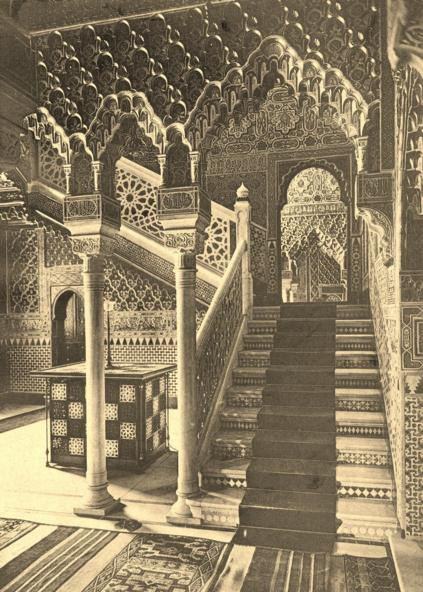
Palacio de Xifré

The Palacio de Xifré is a Madrilenian palace now disappeared that was in the Paseo del Prado, at the corner Calle de Lope de Vega, opposite the Prado Museum. It was one of the best examples of Neo-Mudéjar architecture in Madrid and one of the palaces that the Spanish financial elite of the second half of the 19th century had built along the paseos del Prado, Recoletos and la Castellana.

The architect was Émile Boeswillwald.

== History ==
It was here that was built the Palace of Xifré Downing (son of Josep Xifré i Casas), which was located in the Paseo del Prado on the corner with Calle Lope de Vega. In 1857, the financier bought nine sites located between Calle Lope de Vega and Trajineros (current Paseo del Prado) to the Duke of Medinaceli. The area had begun installing the elite members of Madrid. The construction works discoursed between 1858 and 1862.

== Bibliography ==
- Marc Previ Febrer (2012). El llinatge dels Xifré i la seva contribució social i cultural (1777 – 1920) (PDF) (in Catalan).
- María Isabel Gea (2002). "Palacio de Xifré". Diccionario Enciclopédico de Madrid. Madrid: La Librería.
