= Neuwiller-lès-Saverne =

- Commune
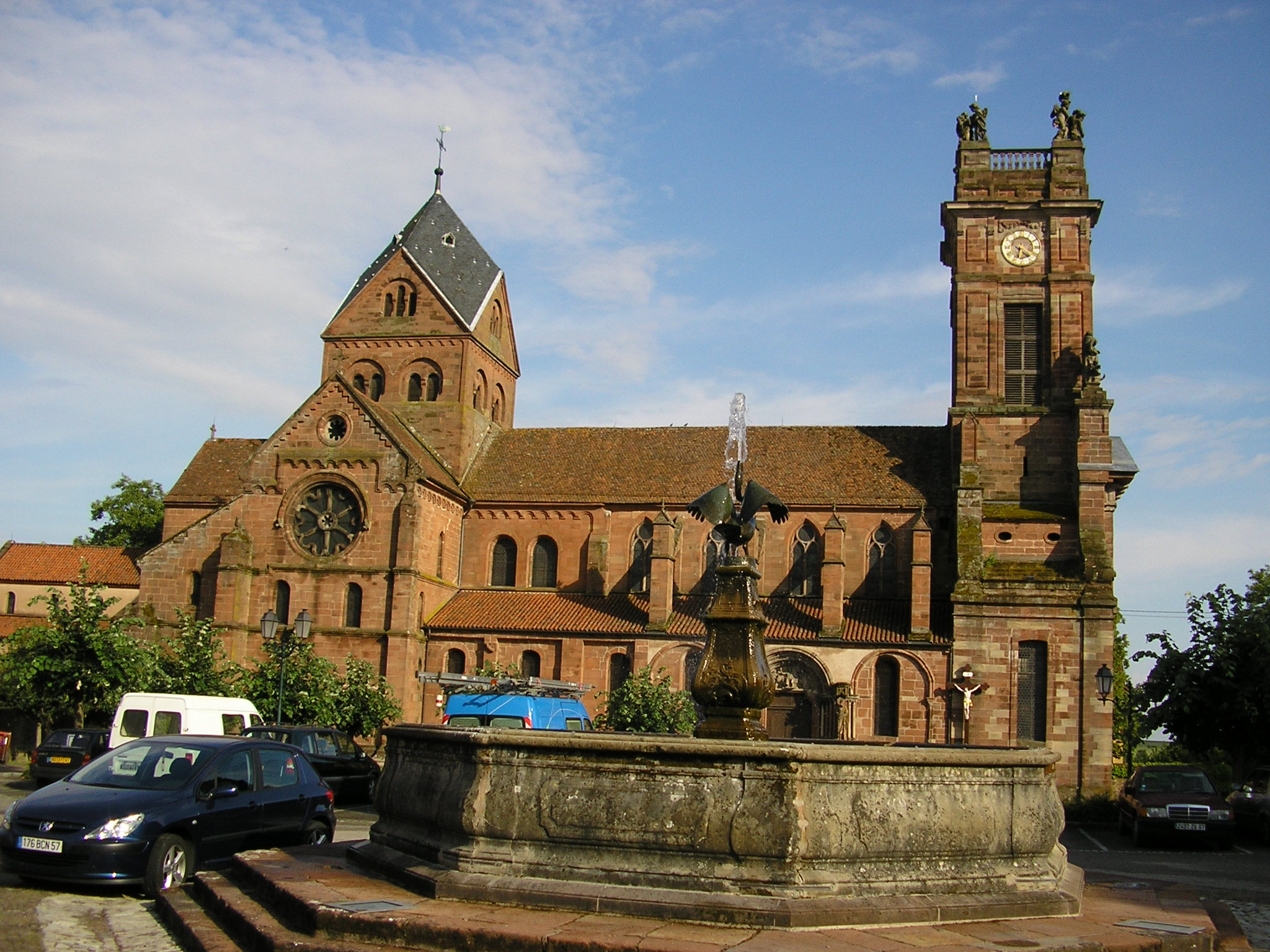
- The Abbey church in Neuwiller-lès-Saverne

- Coat of arms
- Location of Neuwiller-lès-Saverne
- Location within France Location within Grand Est
- Coordinates: 48°49′26″N 7°24′07″E
- Country: France
- Region: Grand Est
- Department: Bas-Rhin
- Arrondissement: Saverne
- Canton: Ingwiller
- Intercommunality: Communauté de communes de Hanau-La Petite Pierre

Government
  - Mayor (2020–2026): Daniel Burrus
- Area^{1}: 31.89 km^{2} (12.31 sq mi)
- Highest elevation: 415 m (1,362 ft)
- Lowest elevation: 187 m (614 ft)
- Population (2023): 1,079
  - Density: 33.84/km^{2} (87.63/sq mi)
- Demonym: Neuwiller(es)
- Time zone: UTC+01:00 (CET)
  - Summer (DST): UTC+02:00 (CEST)
- INSEE/Postal code: 67322 /67330
- ^{1} French Land Register data, which excludes lakes, ponds, glaciers > 1 km^{2} (0.386 sq mi or 247 acres) and river estuaries.

Neuwiller-lès-Saverne (French pronunciation: [nøvilɛʁ lɛ savɛʁn], literally Neuwiller near Saverne; German: Neuweiler; Alsatian: Neiwiller) is a commune located in the historic and cultural region of Alsace and the Northern Vosges Regional Nature Park in northeastern France. Neuwiller-lès-Saverne is within the Bas-Rhin department in the Grand Est region, and since 2021, is part of the European Collectivity of Alsace territorial collective. The commune is also a member of the Hanau-La Petite Pierre commune community.

== Landmarks ==
The Église Saint-Pierre-et-Saint-Paul Catholic parish church of Neuwiller-lès-Saverne was formerly the church of a wealthy Benedictine abbey. It is surrounded by buildings and ruins that had once belonged to the same order. It is classified as a monument historique by the French Ministry of Culture since 1840, making it a part of the first list of such heritage buildings. Thanks to its Romanesque parts, the church is a stage on the Romanesque Road of Alsace.

The handsome 1873 synagogue survived the war.

== History ==
=== Benedictine Abbey ===
The village of Neuwiller-lès-Saverne began while Alsace was under the Christianizing rule of the Merovingian dynasty of Franks. In the year 723, Saint Sigibald, bishop of Metz, founded a Benedictine abbey dedicated to Saints Peter and Paul, including considerable land on both sides of the Vosges mountains. Monasteries formed during this time represented important bases of power and wealth for the landowning elites, and were also a source of educated clergy, crucial in the administration of a diminished post-Roman world, and valued as such by Frankish kings.

In 826, Bishop Drogo of Metz, natural son of Charlemagne, transported the remains of Saint Adelphus to be interred at the abbey's church. In the Middle Ages, these relics became so popular with pilgrims that the Benedictines built a second church nearby to serve as a shrine, so as to remain undisturbed in their own sanctuary.

== See also ==
- Communes of the Bas-Rhin department
