= Aubry de Humbert =

Archbishop of Reims

Aubry of Humbert
- Archbishop of Reims
- Church: Catholic Church
- Archdiocese: Reims
- Diocese: Reims
- See: Reims
- Elected: 1207
- In office: 1207–1218
- Predecessor: Guillaume of Champagne
- Successor: Guillaume II of Joinville

Orders
- Rank: Archbishop

Personal details
- Died: December 24, 1218
- Denomination: Catholic
- Residence: Reims
- Occupation: Warrior prelate

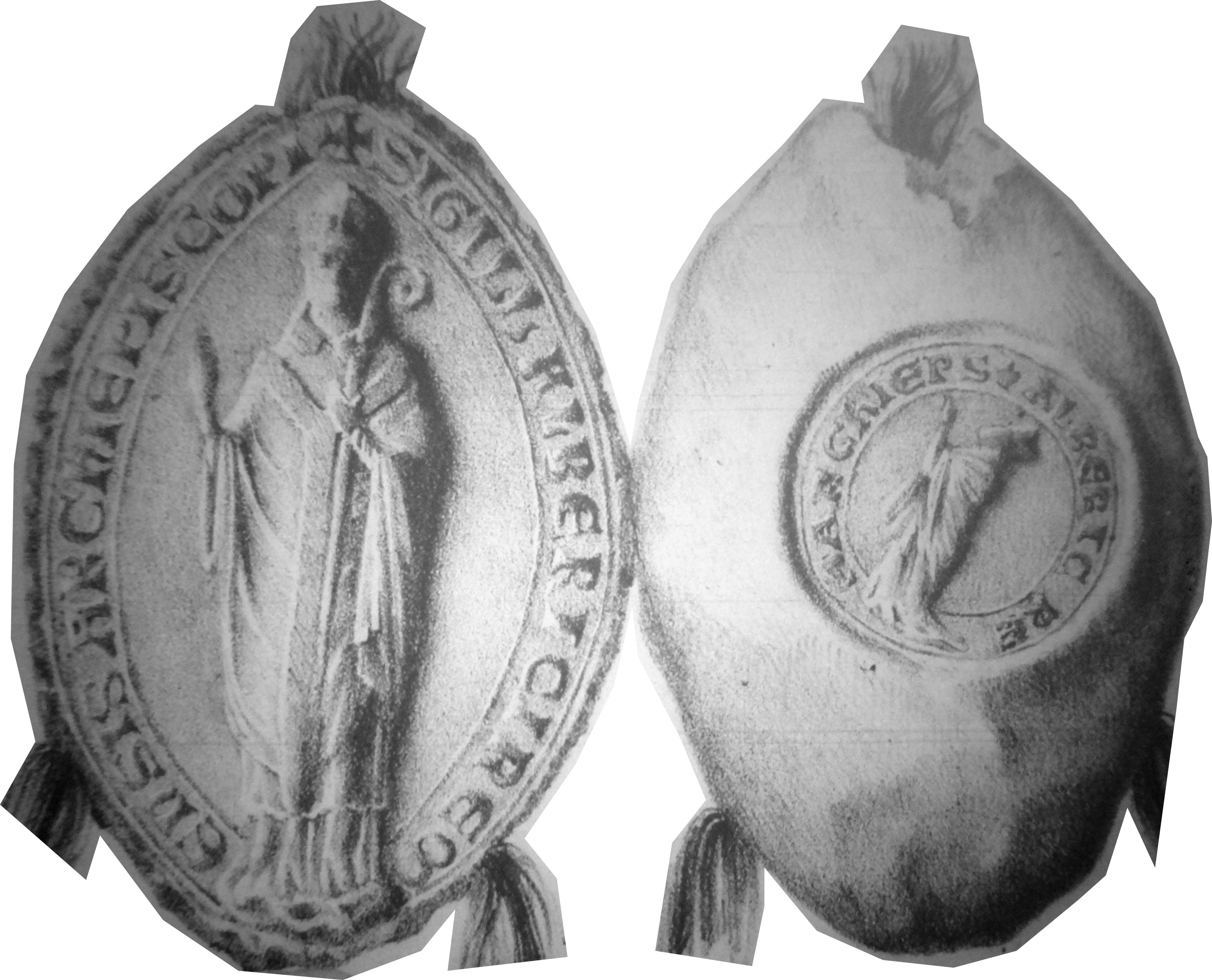

Aubry de Humbert (also spelled Aubrey or Alberic; died 24 December 1218) was the archbishop of Reims from 1207 to 1218. He was a warrior prelate, participating in both the Albigensian Crusade of 1209 and the Fifth Crusade. Upon his return, he was captured in Lisbon, then rescued by the Order of Calatrava.

An inscription states that he laid the first stone of the Reims cathedral on 6 May 1211, though there are doubts about his presence at the ceremony.

Catholic Church titles
| Preceded by Guy Pare | Archbishop of Reims; 1207–1218 | Succeeded by William of Joinville |
