= Église Saint-Pierre-et-Saint-Paul, Neuwiller-lès-Saverne =

Coordinates: 48°49′25″N 7°24′20″E

Église Saint-Pierre-et-Saint-Paul
- Abbatiale Saint-Pierre-et-Saint-Paul
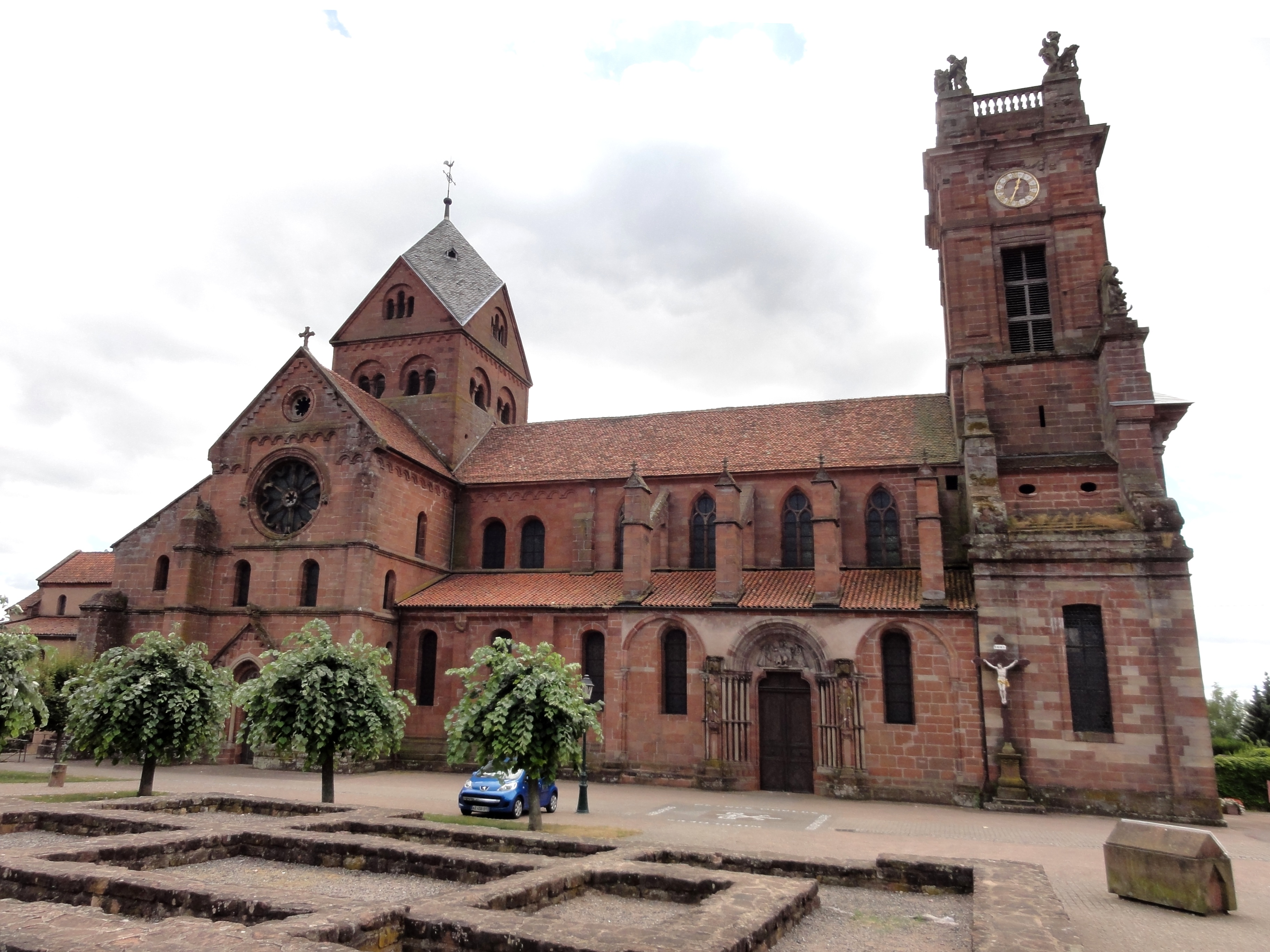
- Église Saint-Pierre-et-Saint-Paul
- Location: Neuwiller-lès-Saverne
- Country: France
- Denomination: Catholic

History
- Founded: 8th century
- Dedication: Saint Peter; Saint Paul

Architecture
- Heritage designation: Monument historique
- Designated: 1840
- Style: Romanesque; Gothic; French Neoclassicism; Romanesque Revival
- Groundbreaking: 9th century
- Completed: 1773

Specifications
- Length: 66 m (217 ft)
- Materials: Pink Vosges sandstone

Administration
- Archdiocese: Archdiocese of Strasbourg
- Parish: Communauté de paroisses catholiques du Bastberg et du Pays de La Petite Pierre

Église Saint-Pierre-et-Saint-Paul is the Catholic parish church of the village of Neuwiller-lès-Saverne, in the Bas-Rhin department of France.

Formerly the church of a rich Benedictine abbey founded in 726, it is surrounded by buildings and ruins that had once belonged to the same order. Thanks to its Romanesque parts, the church is a stage on the Romanesque Road of Alsace. It is classified as a monument historique by the French Ministry of Culture since 1840, making it a part of the very first list of such heritage buildings.

== Architecture ==
The church's exterior architecture is strikingly clear-cut, insofar as its visible parts are growing younger from East to West, or older from West to East. The purely Romanesque superposed chapels behind the choir date from the 11th century; the choir itself, the transept and the easternmost bay of the nave date from the late 12th and early 13th century and reflect a transitional style between Romanesque and Gothic architecture; the rest of the nave was rebuilt later in the 13th century, in a sober but well defined Gothic style; while the facade with its porch tower was rebuilt between 1768 and 1773 in the Louis Quinze style. The crossing tower was modified by architect Émile Boeswillwald during a restoration campaign in the years 1852–1858. Interestingly, the former church of the nearby Marmoutier Abbey has an identical architectural history, but in reverse: the western part is Romanesque, the nave is Gothic and the choir was rebuilt in the 18th century. Each church also has a crypt that is even older than the surfacing parts (in Neuwiller's case, it dates from the 9th century).

Inside, the choir is separated from the rear chapels by a wall that appears to shorten the visible space: while the whole building's length is 66 metres (217 feet), the total combined length of nave, transept and choir is only 43 metres (141 feet).

== Description ==
The church holds the relics of Saint Adelphus since the first half of the 9th century. In the Middle Ages, these relics had become so popular with pilgrims that the Benedictines built a second church nearby (1190–1225, now the village's Protestant church) specially to serve as a shrine, so as to remain undisturbed in their own sanctuary. The reliquary of Saint Adelphus was later moved back into Saint-Pierre-et-Saint-Paul in the 19th century, after the dissolution of the abbey following the French Revolution.

Among the many works of art inside the former abbey church, the four, late 15th or early 16th-century tapestries depicting the life and the miracles of Adelphus, on display in the upper of the superposed Romanesque chapels (dedicated to Saint Sebastian), are perhaps the most notable. A strikingly gory scene depicts a knight being forced by divine wrath to devour his own hand after having tried to break the saint's sarcophagus. The 12th-century baptismal fonts, the 14th-century statue of the Virgin and Child, the 1478 Entombment of Christ, and the 18th-century carved choir stalls are also especially noteworthy. All these objects are classified as monuments historiques.

== Gallery ==
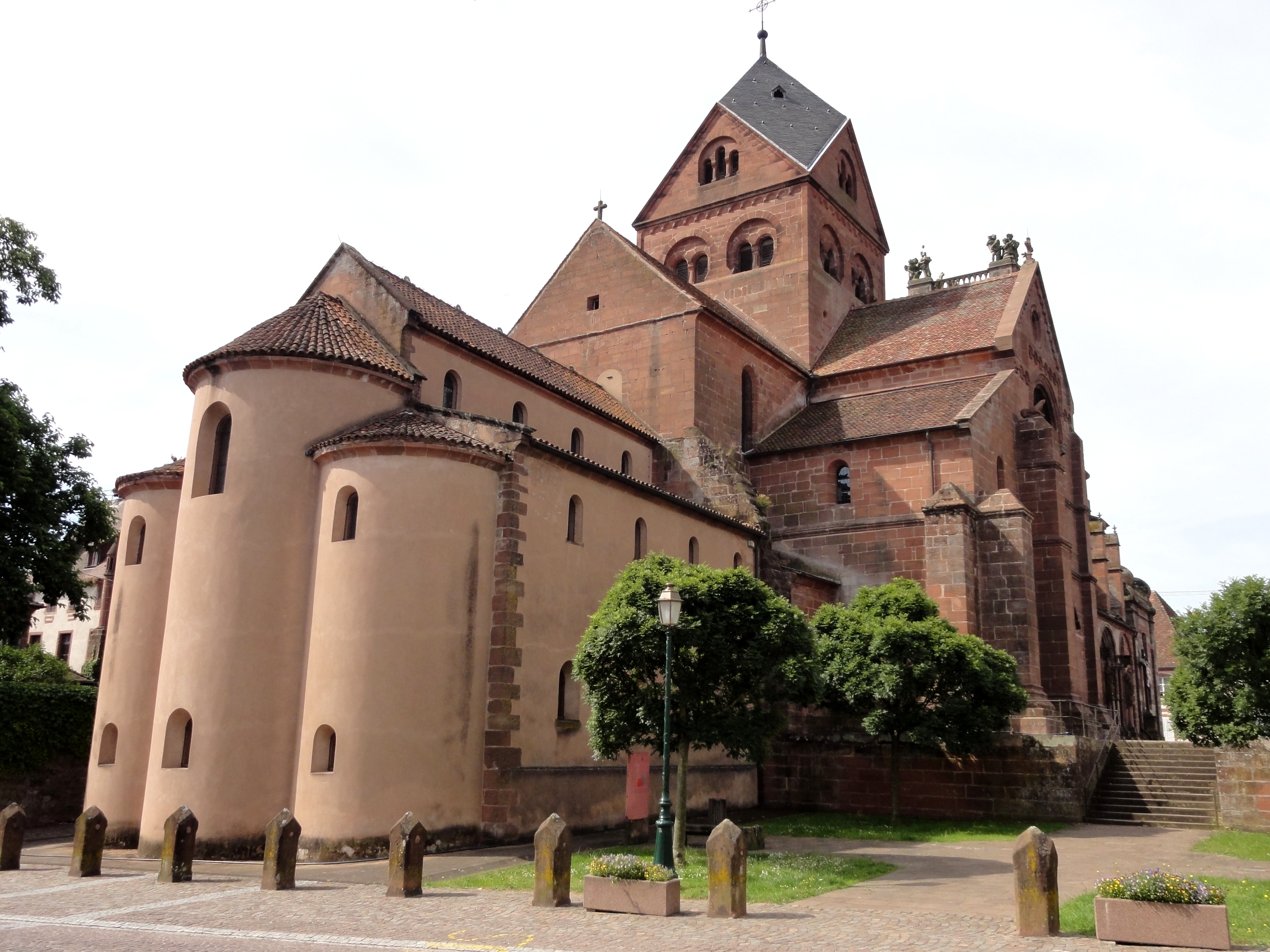
Rear of the church

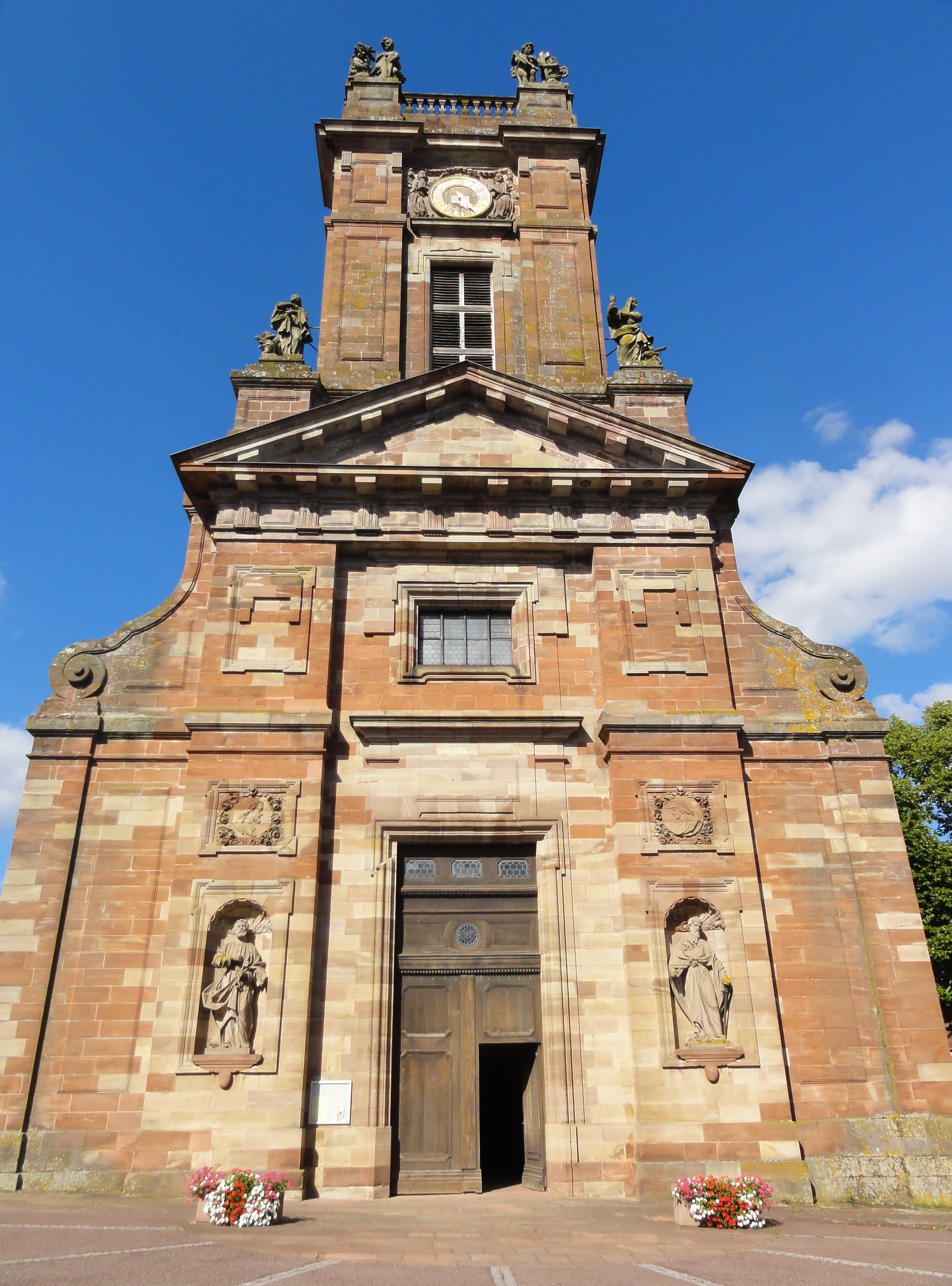
Neoclassical facade and porch tower

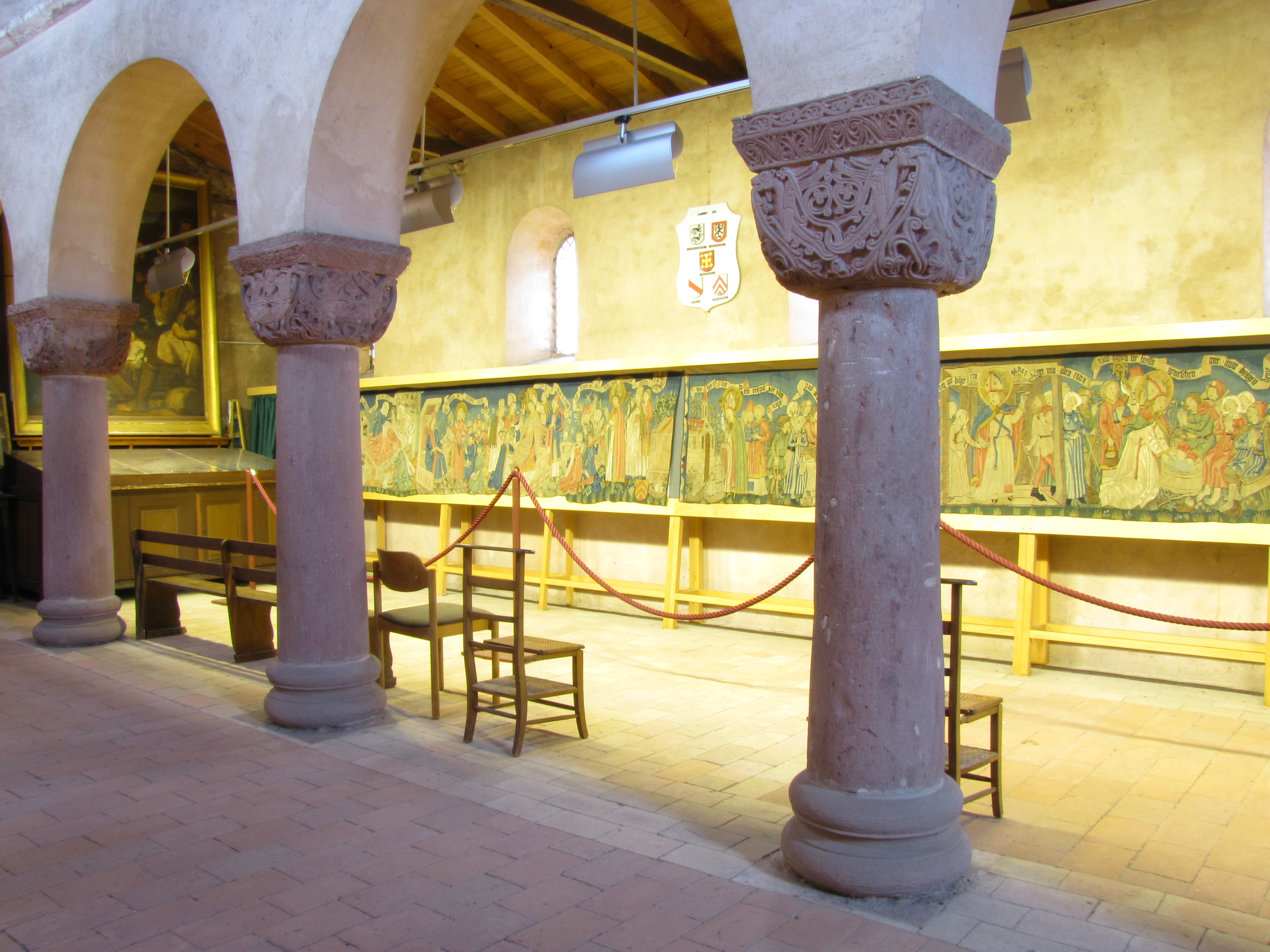
Upper Romanesque chapel with capitals and tapestry

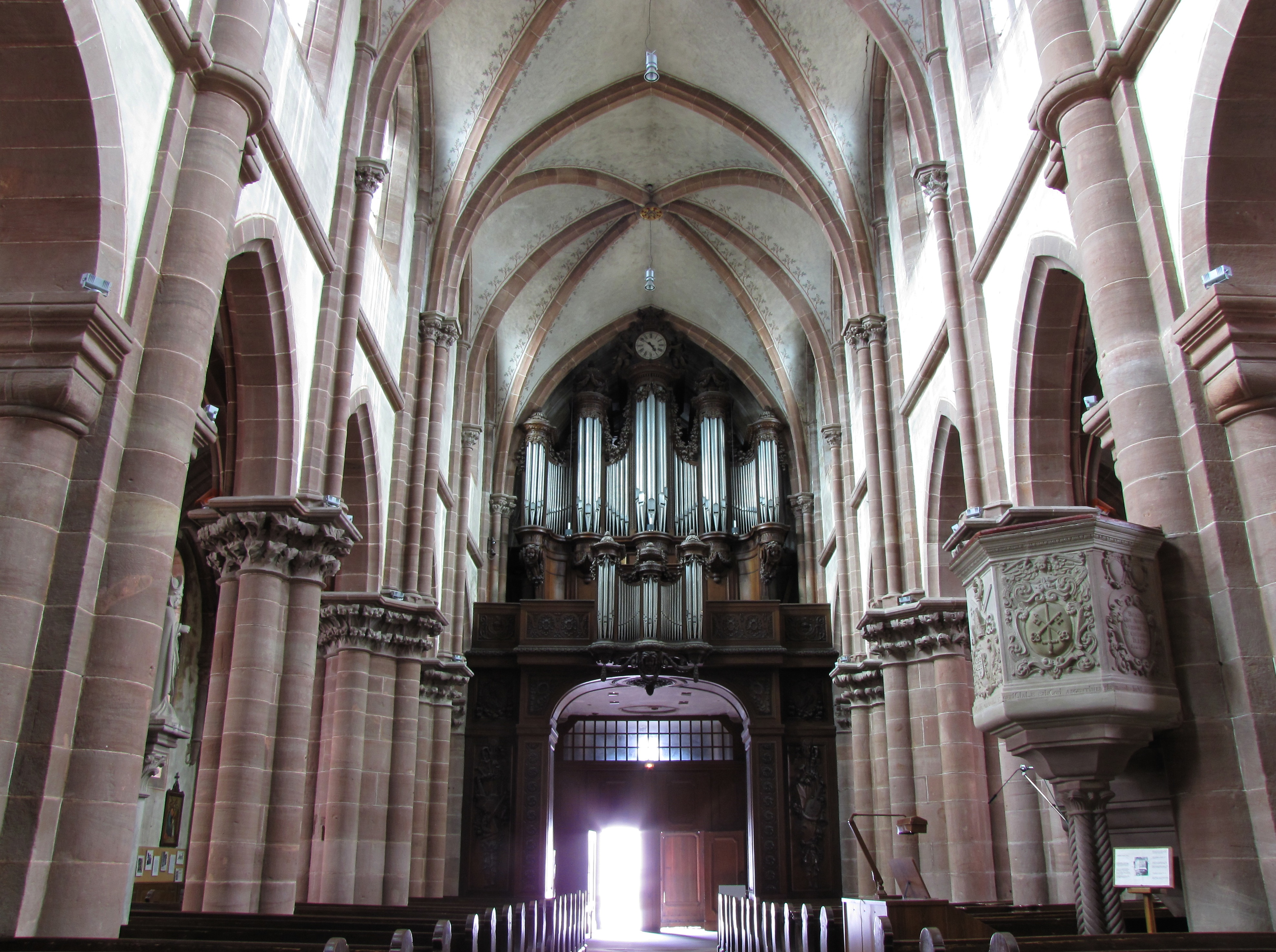
Gothic nave with pulpit and pipe organ

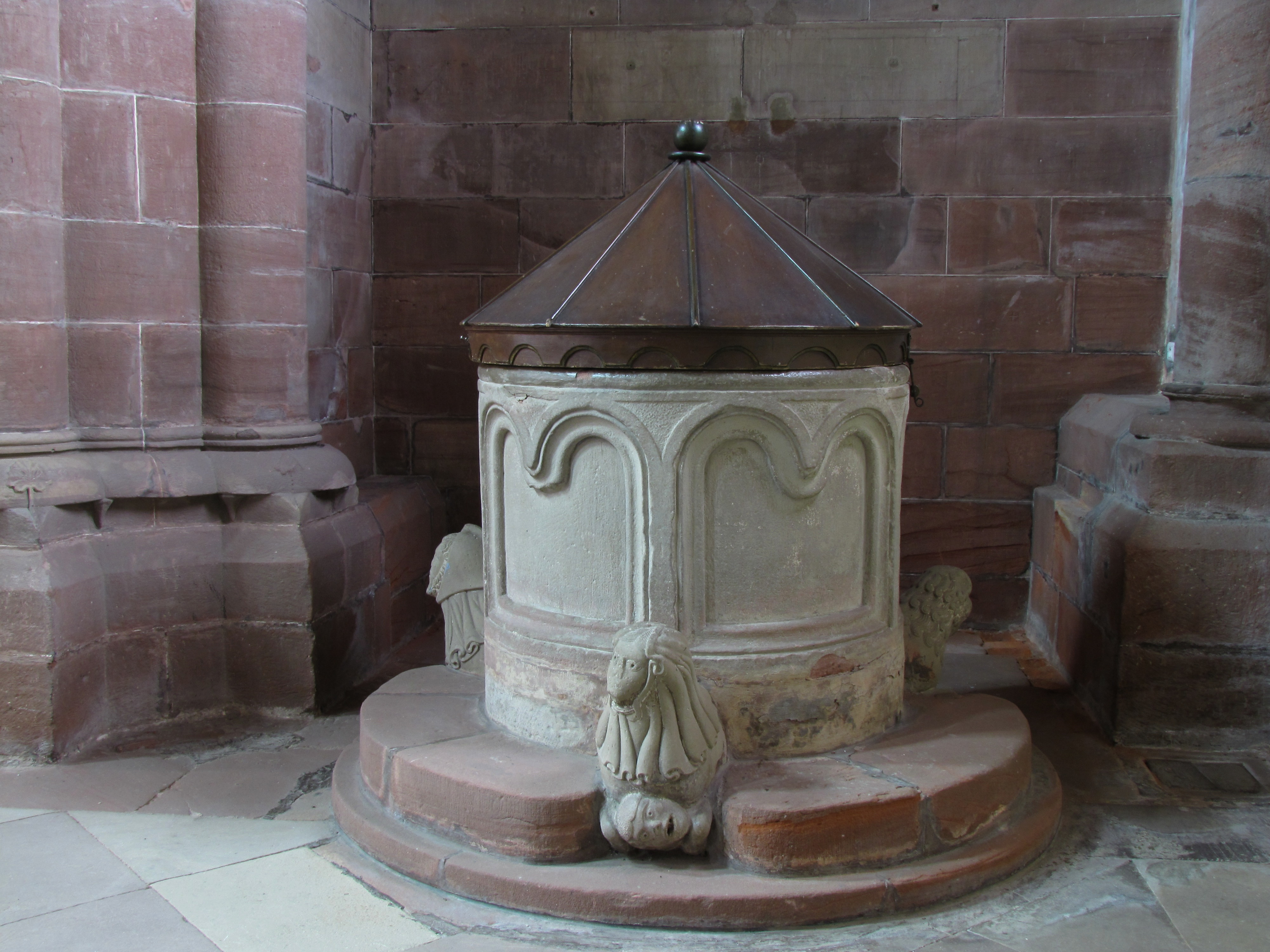
12th-century baptismal fonts

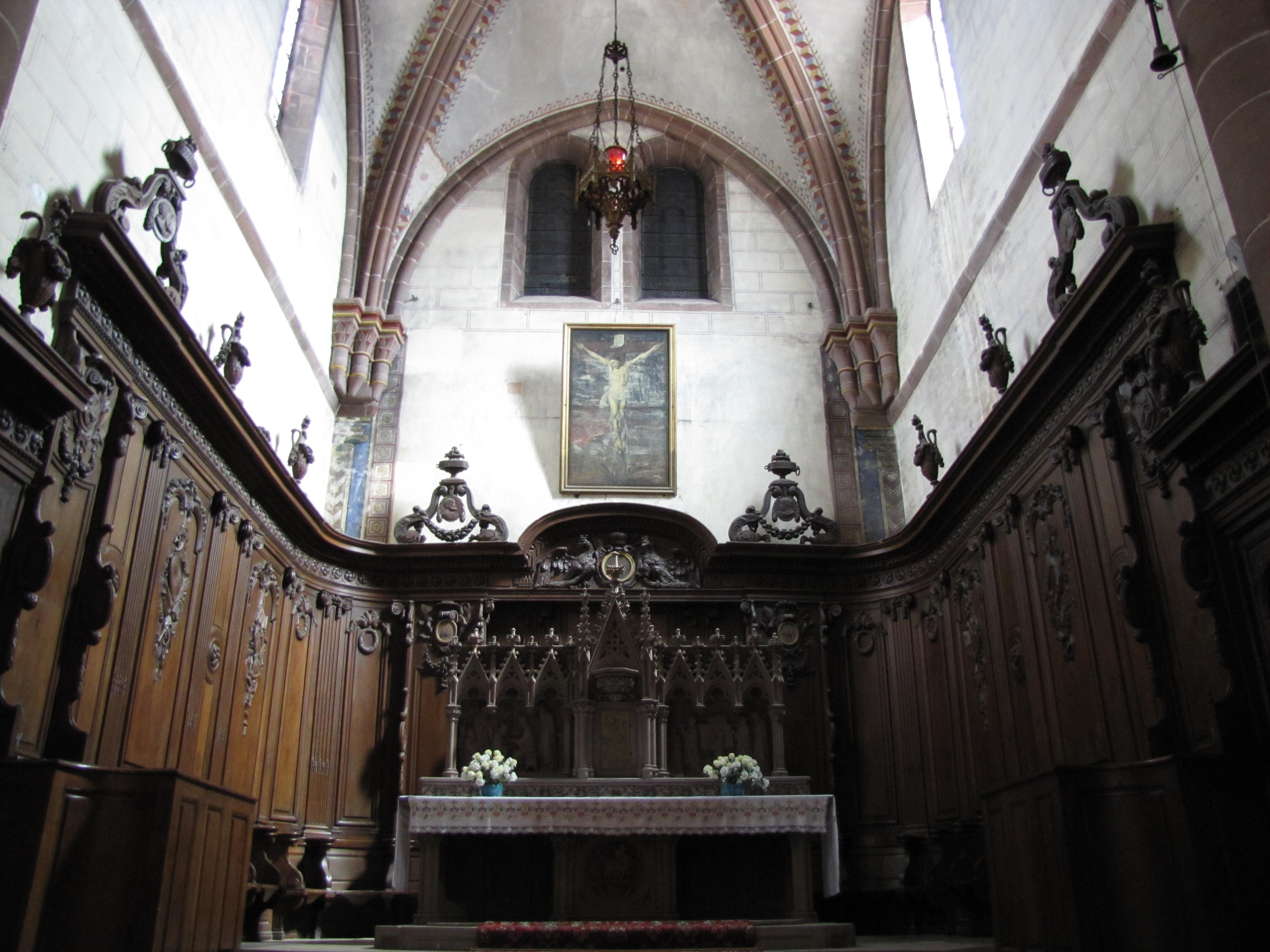
18th-century choir stalls

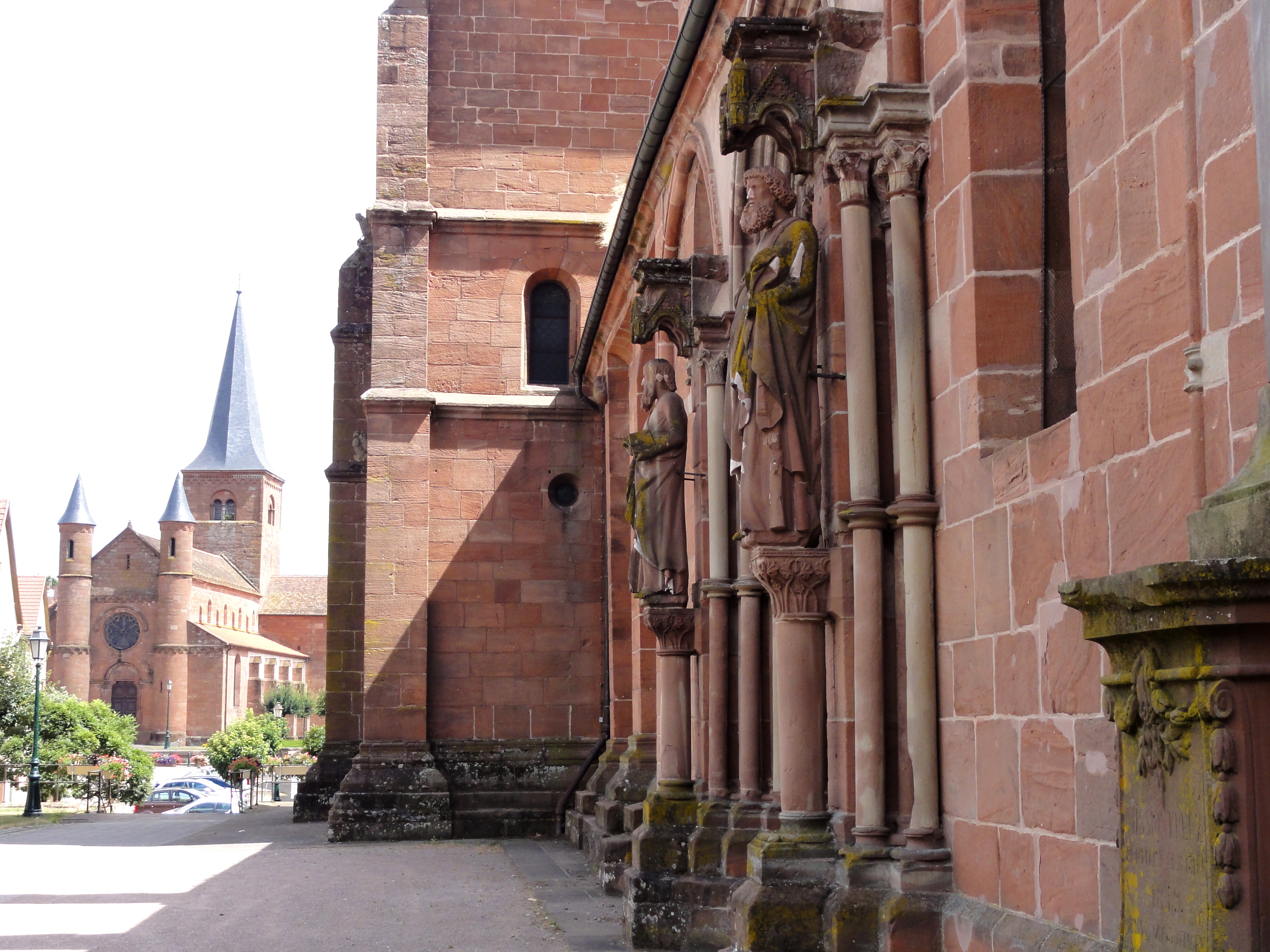
Église Saint-Adelphe, the secondary church, seen from Église Saint-Pierre-et-Saint-Paul
