= Max Sainsaulieu =

French architect

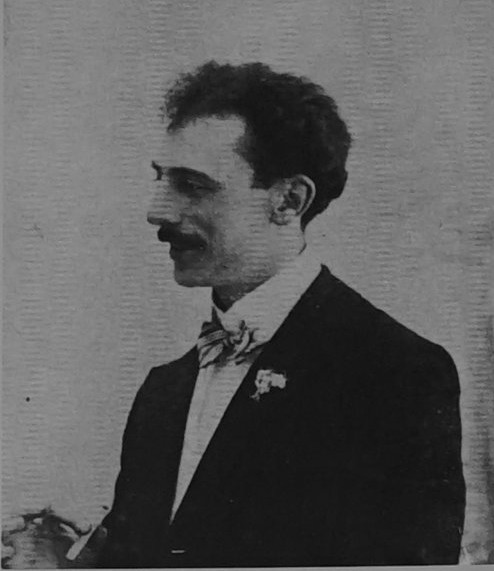
- Born: 17 July 1870; Péronne
- Died: 21 February 1953 (aged 82); Paris
- Education: École Nationale Supérieure des Beaux-Arts
- Occupation: Architect
- Awards: Gold Medal of the 1925 Exposition Internationale des Arts Décoratifs et Industriels Modernes, Knight of Légion d'honneur
- Buildings: Carnegie library of Reims

Max Sainsaulieu (17 July 1870 – 21 February 1953) was a French architect. Author of numerous accomplishments in Reims and Soissons before the First World War (including the completion of the church of Sainte Clotilde, the church of Saint Benoît, and the house of Jacques Simon) he participated actively in the reconstruction of Reims in the immediate post-war period.

== Life ==
Born in 1870 in Péronne, Max Sainsaulieu trained in architecture with Edmond Duthoit, Inspector of Historic Monuments in Algeria, before joining in 1891 the École Nationale Supérieure des Beaux-Arts in Paris. He attended the lessons of Constant Moyaux (1837–1889) and of Paul Boeswillwald (1844–1931). In 1898, he received his architecture degree after a study on the restoration of the Fontenelle Abbey in Saint-Wandrille-Rançon.

He came to Reims to contribute to the completion of the Basilica of St. Clotilde. He married the daughter of local architect Alphonse Gosset (1835–1914). He then settled at Soissons in 1903, where he was appointed architect of historical monuments. In 1909, he returned to Reims to gradually resume the activities of his father-in-law Alphonse Gosset. He designed several houses, mansions and churches in Reims. At the declaration of war, Sainsaulieu left Reims but returned after the First Battle of the Marne. Appointed official architect attached to the Cathedral of Reims, his first mission was to protect the left portal of the western facade of the cathedral. Day after day, he reported the effects of the bombardments on the cathedral and on other monuments of Reims. He took all necessary measures to consolidate the battered buildings of the city.

On 12 January 1918, Sainsaulieu was created a knight of the Légion d'honneur.

== Selected works ==
- Carnegie Library of Reims, 1927
- Railway station of Contrexéville
