= Johanna of Hanau-Lichtenberg, Countess of Eberstein =

German noblewoman (1507–1572)

Johanna of Hanau-Lichtenberg
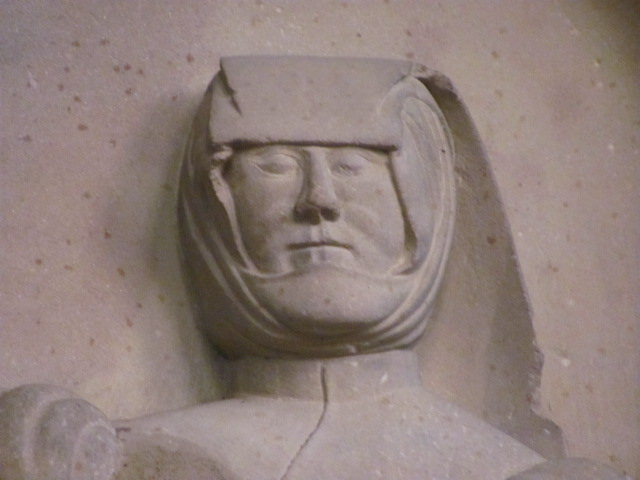
- Born: 1507
- Died: 27 January 1572; Eberstein Castle in Gernsbach
- Buried: St. James Church in Gernsbach
- Noble family: House of Hanau
- Spouse: Wilhelm IV of Eberstein
- Father: Philipp III, Count of Hanau-Lichtenberg
- Mother: Sibylle of Baden

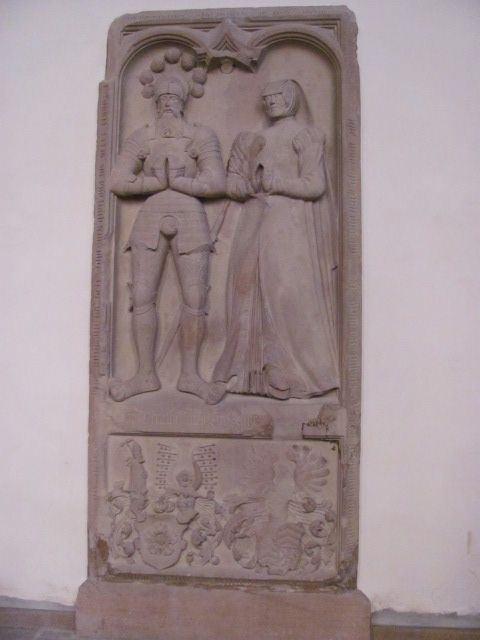
Epitaph of Count William IV of Eberstein and his wife Countess Johanna of Hanau-Lichtenberg in the St. James Church in Gernsbach

Johanna of Hanau-Lichtenberg, Countess of Eberstein (1507 – 27 January 1572) was a German noblewoman, the eldest daughter of Philipp III, Count of Hanau-Lichtenberg (18 October 1482 – 15 May 1538) and Margravine Sibylle of Baden (26 April 1485 – 10 July 1518).

== Life ==
Johanna was married on 6 November 1522 to Count Wilhelm IV of Eberstein (3 May 1497 – 1 July 1562). Her husband chaired the Reichskammergericht from 1546 to 1555. Johanna and William are mentioned several times in the Zimmern Chronicle.

She died on 27 January 1572 at Eberstein Castle in Gernsbach. Two days later, Johanna was buried in the parish church of Gernsbach. An epitaph, which shows her and her husband, can still be seen there.

== Marriage and issue ==
She and Count Wilhelm IV of Eberstein were married on 6 November 1522, and together had the following children:

1. Philip I (1523 – 11 September 1589 in Remlingen), succeeded his father as Count of Eberstein. He was an imperial councillor and governor in the Upper Alsace. He married Johanna de Bailleul, Dame de Douxlieu (d. 12 April 1565). In 1577, he was put under a legal guardian because of his "insanity".
2. Anna (1524–1546)
3. Elisabeth (1526–1555)
4. Felicitas (1527–1565), abbess of the Ladies' Convent St. Hippolyte in Gerresheim
5. Kunigunde (1528 – 13 July 1575), married to Count Froben Christoph of Zimmern (1519–1566)
6. William (1529 – 3 June 1561), canon in Strasbourg, where he later also served as choirmaster and as dean, and canon in Cologne
7. Sibylla (1531–1589), married Count Markus Fugger (1529 – 18 April 1597)
8. Bruno (b. 1532)
9. Otto (1533 – 4 December 1576, drowned in Antwerp), was a canon in Strasbourg. He later reverted to the lay state and became an imperial councillor and later Colonel.
10. Anna (1536–1537)

== Ancestors ==
Ancestors of Johanna of Hanau-Lichtenberg, Countess of Eberstein

8. Philipp I, Count of Hanau-Lichtenberg (1417-1480)
4. Philipp II, Count of Hanau-Lichtenberg (1462-1504)
9. Anna of Lichtenberg (1442-1474)
2. Philipp III, Count of Hanau-Lichtenberg (1482-1538)
10. Louis II of Isenburg-Büdingen (1422-1511)
5. Anna of Isenburg-Büdingen (d. 1522)
11. Maria of Nassau-Wiesbaden-Idstein (1438-1480)
1. Johanna of Hanau-Lichtenberg
12. Charles I, Margrave of Baden-Baden (d. 1475)
6. Christoph I, Margrave of Baden-Baden (1453-1527)
13. Catherine of Austria (1424-1493)
3. Sibylle of Baden (1485-1518)
14. Philip the Younger of Katzenelnbogen (1427-1453)
7. Ottilie of Katzenelnbogen (1453-1517)
15. Ottilie of Nassau-Siegen (1437-1493)

== See also ==
- Zimmern Chronicle
