= Wilhelm IV of Eberstein =

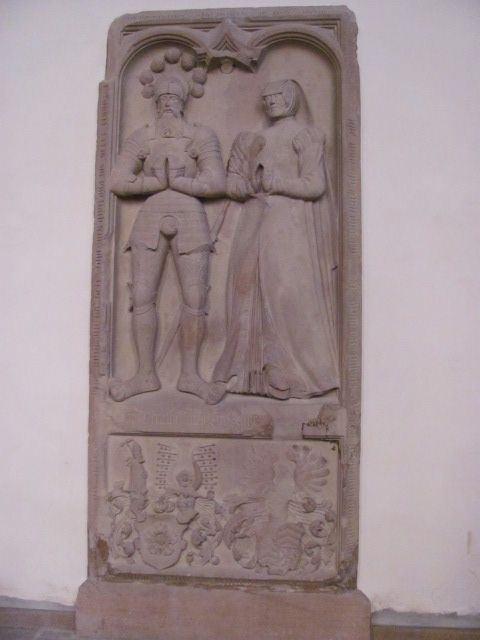
- Tombstone for Wilhelm IV of Eberstein and Johanna of Hanau-Lichtenberg in the St. Jakob church in Gernsbach
- Born: 3 May 1497
- Died: 1 July 1562 (aged 65)
- Buried: St. Jakob church in Gernsbach
- Noble family: Eberstein
- Spouse: Johanna of Hanau-Lichtenberg
- Father: Bernhard III of Eberstein
- Mother: Kunigunde of Sonnenberg

Count Wilhelm IV of Eberstein (3 May 1497 – 1 July 1562) was a member of the Swabian noble Eberstein family. His father, Bernhard III (1459–1526) was president of the Reichskammergericht from 1510 to 1520. His mother was Countess Kunigunde of Sonnenberg (1472–1538).

Like his father, Wilhelm IV served as president of the Reichskammergericht; he presided from 1546 to 1555. He and his wife are mentioned several times in the Zimmern Chronicle, which was written by their son-in-law, Count Froben Christoph of Zimmern.

In 1561, Wilhelm officially converted the County of Eberstein to Protestantism. He had been unofficially promoting the Evangelical faith for some time. He expanded his Neu-Eberstein Castle significantly. A tombstone depicting Wilhelm and his wife, has been preserved in the St. Jakob church in Gernsbach.

== Marriage and issue ==
On 6 November 1522, he married Countess Johanna of Hanau-Lichtenberg (1507–1572), the eldest daughter of Philipp III, Count of Hanau-Lichtenberg (1482–1538) and Margravine Sibylle of Baden (1485–1518). They had the following children:

1. Philipp I (1523 – 11 September 1589 in Remlingen), member of the Imperial Council, Supreme Captain and Reeve in Upper Alsace, married to Johanna of Bailleul, Dame of Douxlieu (d. 12 April 1565). In 1577, Philipp was put under guardianship because of mental problems.
2. Anna (1524–1546)
3. Elisabeth (1526–1555)
4. Felicity (1527–1565), Abbess of Gerresheim Abbey
5. Kunigunde (1528 – 13 July 1575), married to Count Froben Christoph of Zimmern (1519–1566)
6. Wilhelm (1529 – 3 June 1561), a canon in the Strasbourg Cathedral (where he later also served as choirmaster and dean) and in Cologne Cathedral
7. Sibylla (1531–1589), married to Count Markus Fugger (1529 – 18 April 1597)
8. Bruno (b. 1532)
9. Otto (1533 – 4 December 1576, drowned in Antwerp), he was initially a canon in Strasbourg and later returned to the lay state and became an imperial councilor and later colonel. He was killed while trying to stop the Spanish Fury in Antwerp.
10. Anna (1536–1537)

== See also ==
- Zimmern Chronicle
