= Meßkirch Castle =

Historic castle in Sigmaringen, Baden-Württemberg, Germany

Coordinates: 47°59′34.65″N 09°06′36.30″E

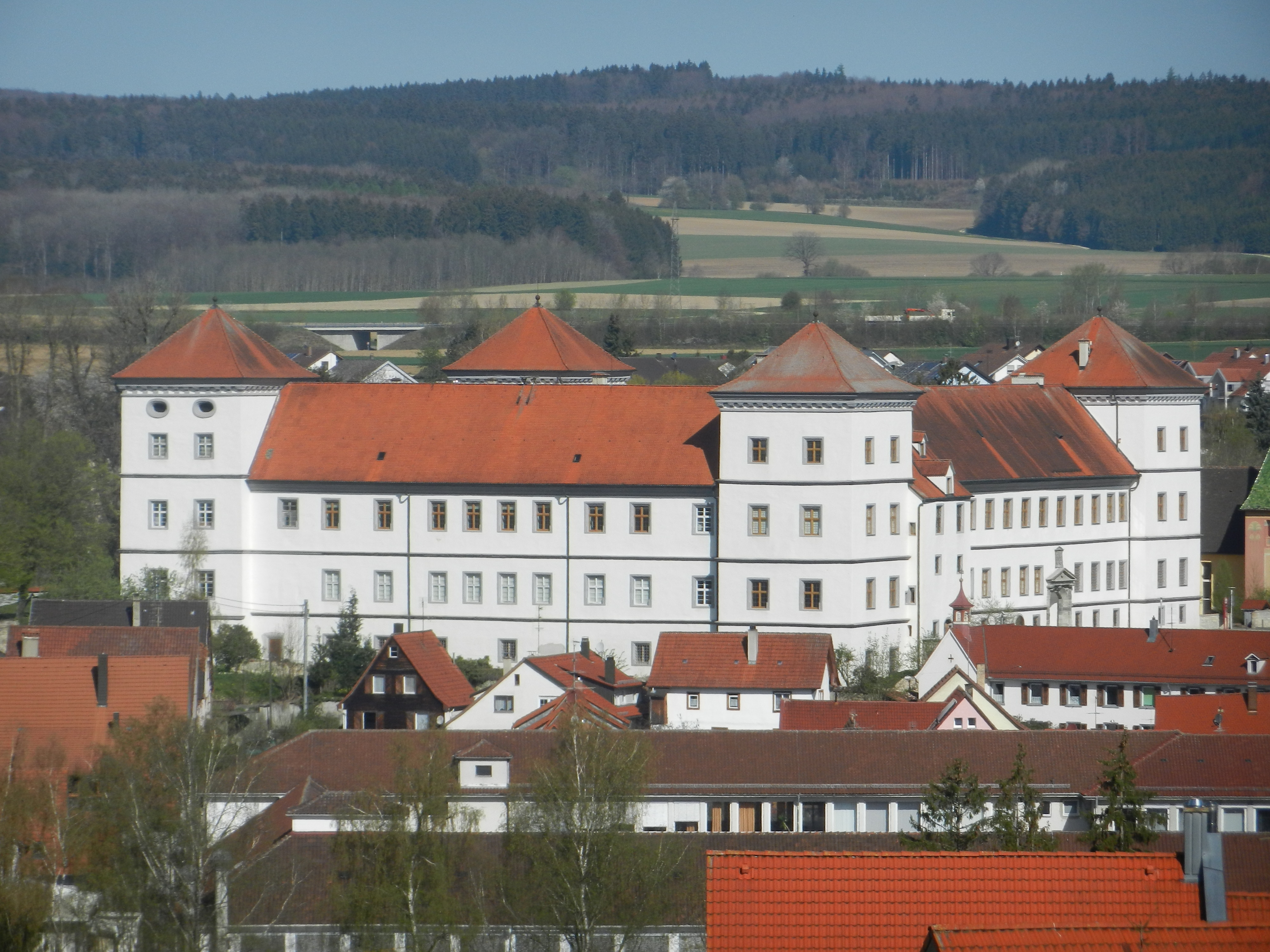
Meßkirch Castle (southern aspect)

Meßkirch Castle or Meßkirch Palace (also spelt "Messkirch", German: Schloss Meßkirch, Schloss der Grafen von Zimmern or Zimmernschloss) is located in the town centre of Meßkirch in the county of Sigmaringen in the German state of Baden-Württemberg. The castle is a cultural and museum centre with castle tours, a county art gallery, a museum about philosopher Martin Heidegger, and the Oldtimer Museum with automobiles and motorcycles.

== History ==
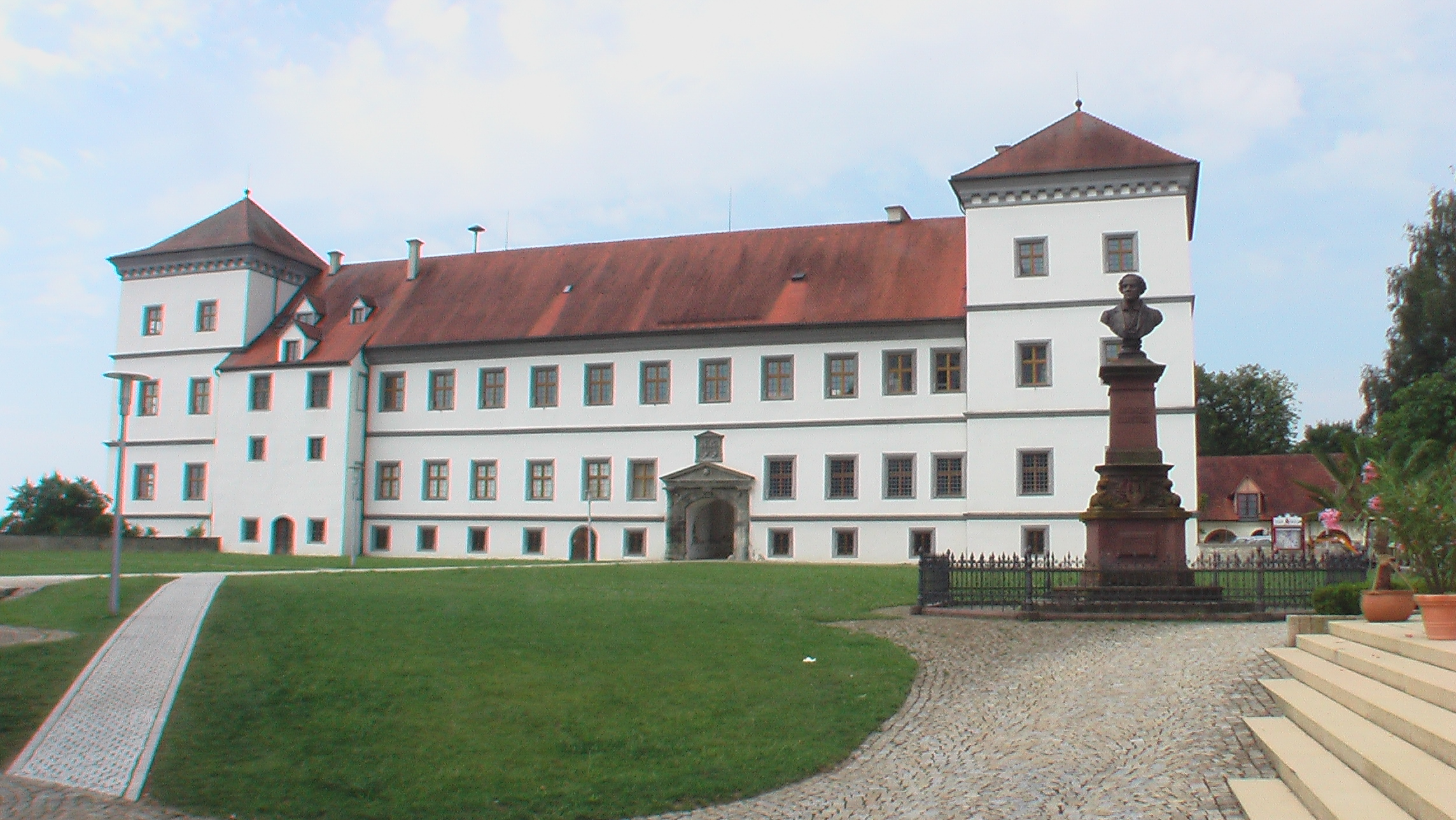
Eastern aspect showing the Conradin Kreutzer Monument

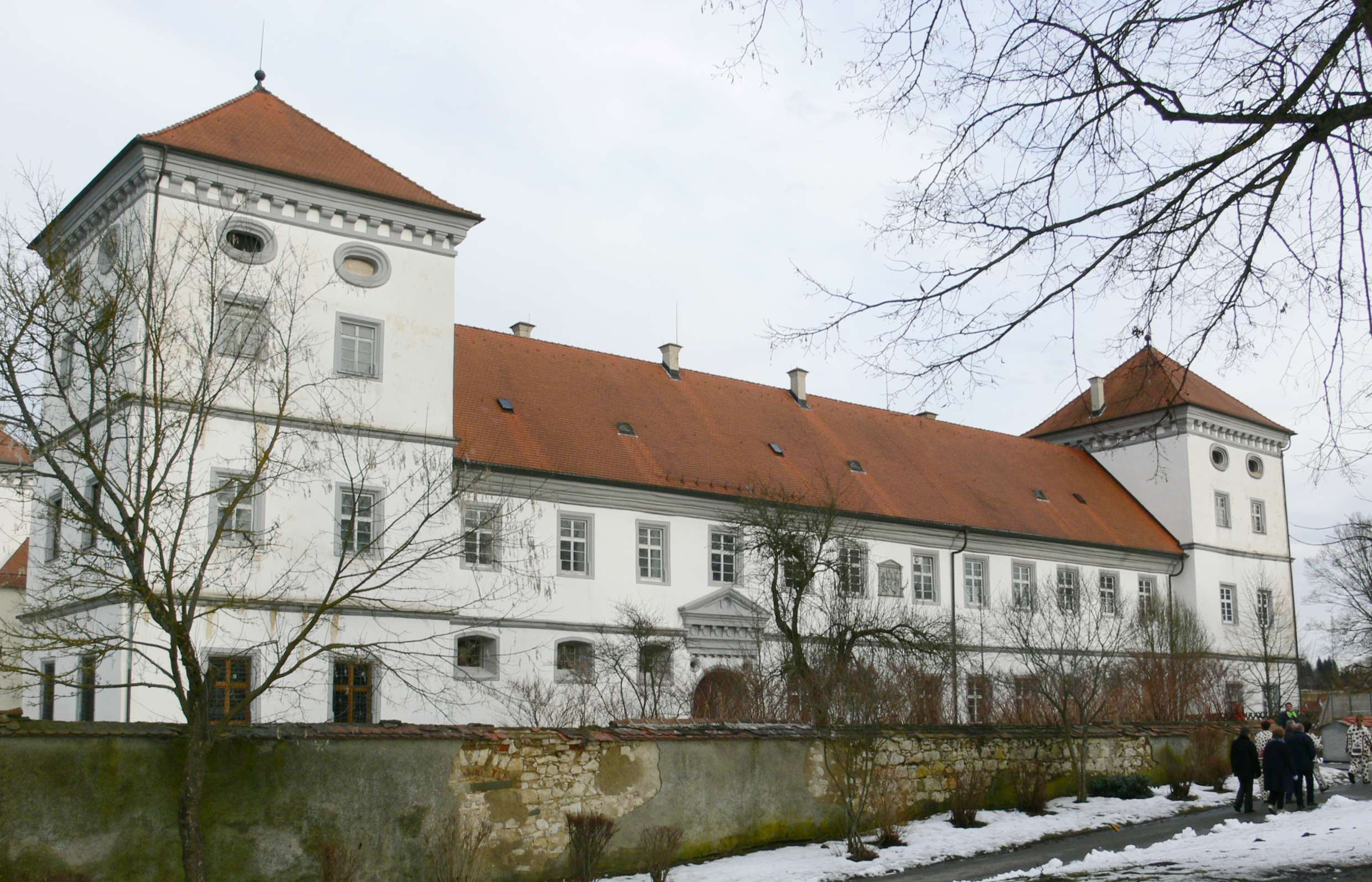
Western aspect seen from the Hofgarten

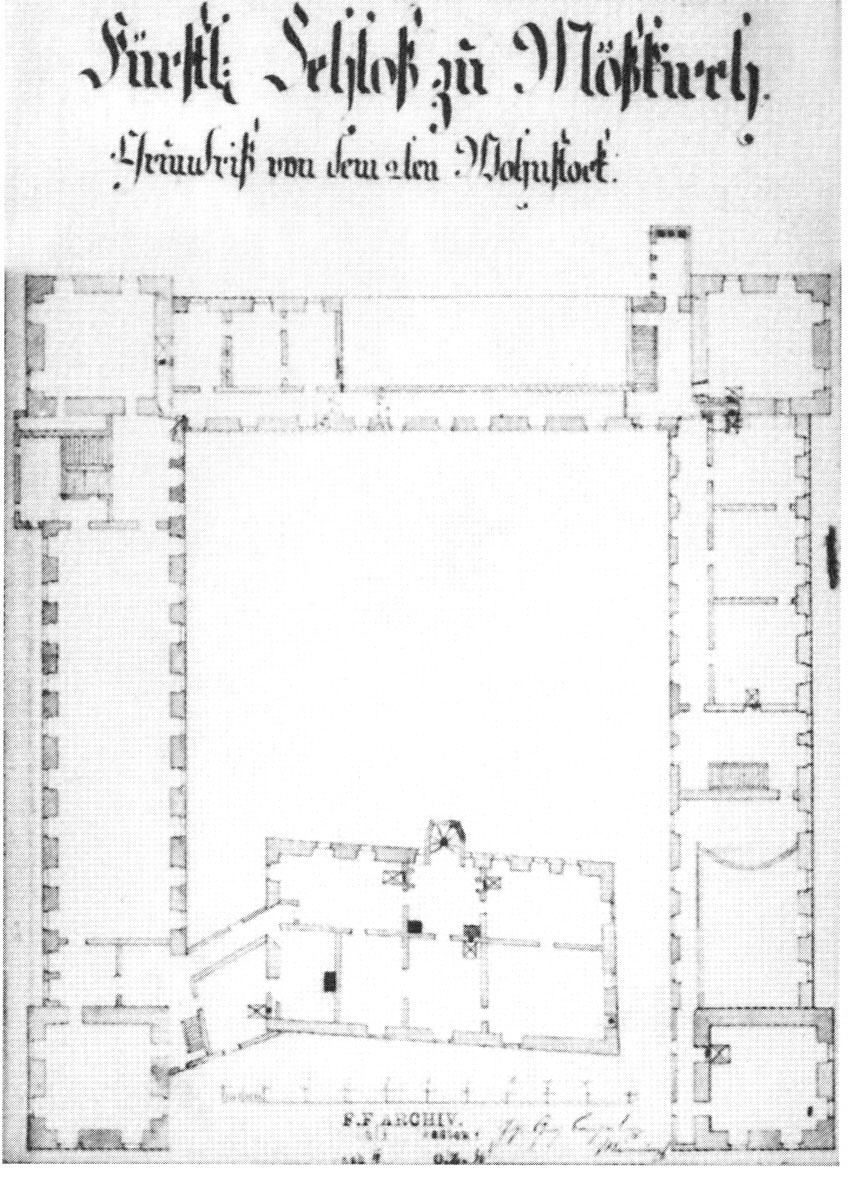
Plan of the second storey around 1820

The castle's origins go back to around 1400. Froben Christoph von Zimmern reported in the Zimmern Chronicle on the remodelling that his uncle, Gottfried Werner had carried out to the old castle beginning in 1520. These measures come in for heavy criticism. The shortcomings in the construction work meant that the castle fell into decay soon thereafter. This gave Froben Christoph also the justification to demolish the old castle completely and replace it with a new schloss.

On 9 May 1557, three years after his accession to power, the new lord of the castle laid the foundation stone for the new building. This is recorded on a capstone with the year 1557 in the town wing of the castle. It is believed that Froben Christoph could have gained inspiration for the palace during his studies between 1534 and 1540 in France (Bourges, Angers and Tours), but construction of the supposed prototype for Meßkirch Castle, Château d'Ancy-le-Franc, which had been completed by Sebastiano Serlio in 1545, had not even begun at that time. The builder of Meßkirch Castle, Jörg Schwarzenberger, is mentioned in 1561 and again in 1566 in Meßkirch. Meßkirch Castle was the first regular, quadrangular Renaissance-style palace to be built north of the Alps.

== Literature ==
- Gabriele Heidenreich: Schloss Meßkirch. Repräsentation adeligen Herrschaftsbewusstseins im 16. Jahrhundert. Bibliotheca-Academica-Verlag, Tübingen 1998, ISBN 3-928471-18-X.
- Hubert Krins: Schloss Meßkirch. Kunstverlag Josef Fink, Lindenberg 2001, ISBN 3-89870-037-2.
