= Ebersteinburg =

- Ortsteil of Baden-Baden
- Interactive map of Ebersteinburg
- Location within Germany Location within Baden-Württemberg
- Coordinates: 48°46′48″N 08°16′12″E
- Country: Germany
- State: Baden-Württemberg
- Admin. region: Karlsruhe
- District: Urban district
- Town: Baden-Baden

Area
  - Total: 5.2 km^{2} (2.0 sq mi)
- Elevation: 415 m (1,362 ft)

Population (2020-12-31)
  - Total: 1,306
  - Density: 250/km^{2} (650/sq mi)
- Time zone: UTC+01:00 (CET)
  - Summer (DST): UTC+02:00 (CEST)
- Postal codes: 76530
- Dialling codes: 07221
- Vehicle registration: BAD
- Website: www.ebersteinburg.de

Ebersteinburg is an Ortsteil of Baden-Baden, Germany. At 426m in elevation it lies between the valleys of the Murg and Oos rivers. The village has a population of 1,300 and since 1972 has been part of the city of Baden-Baden.

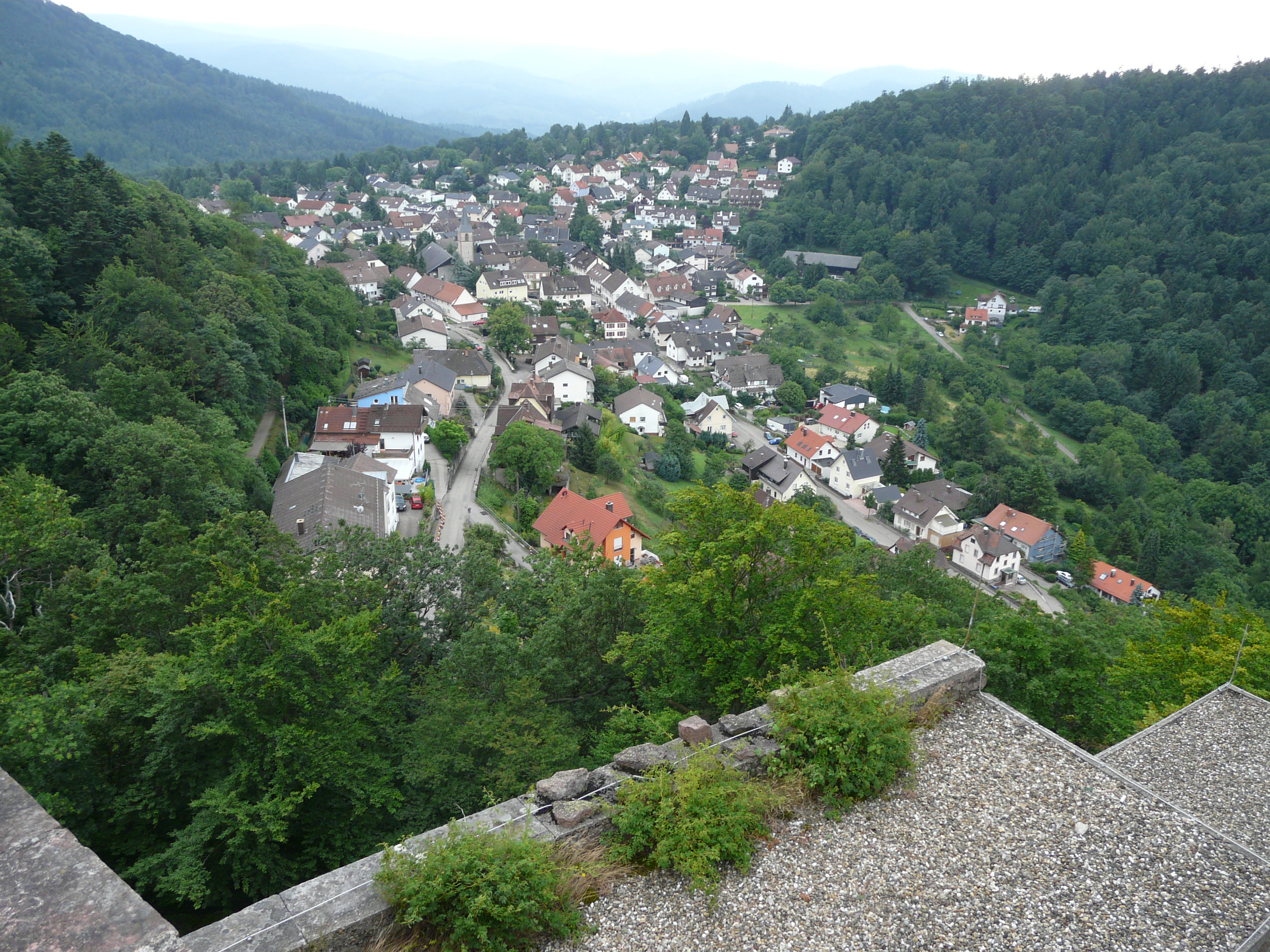
Ebersteinburg seen from the castle

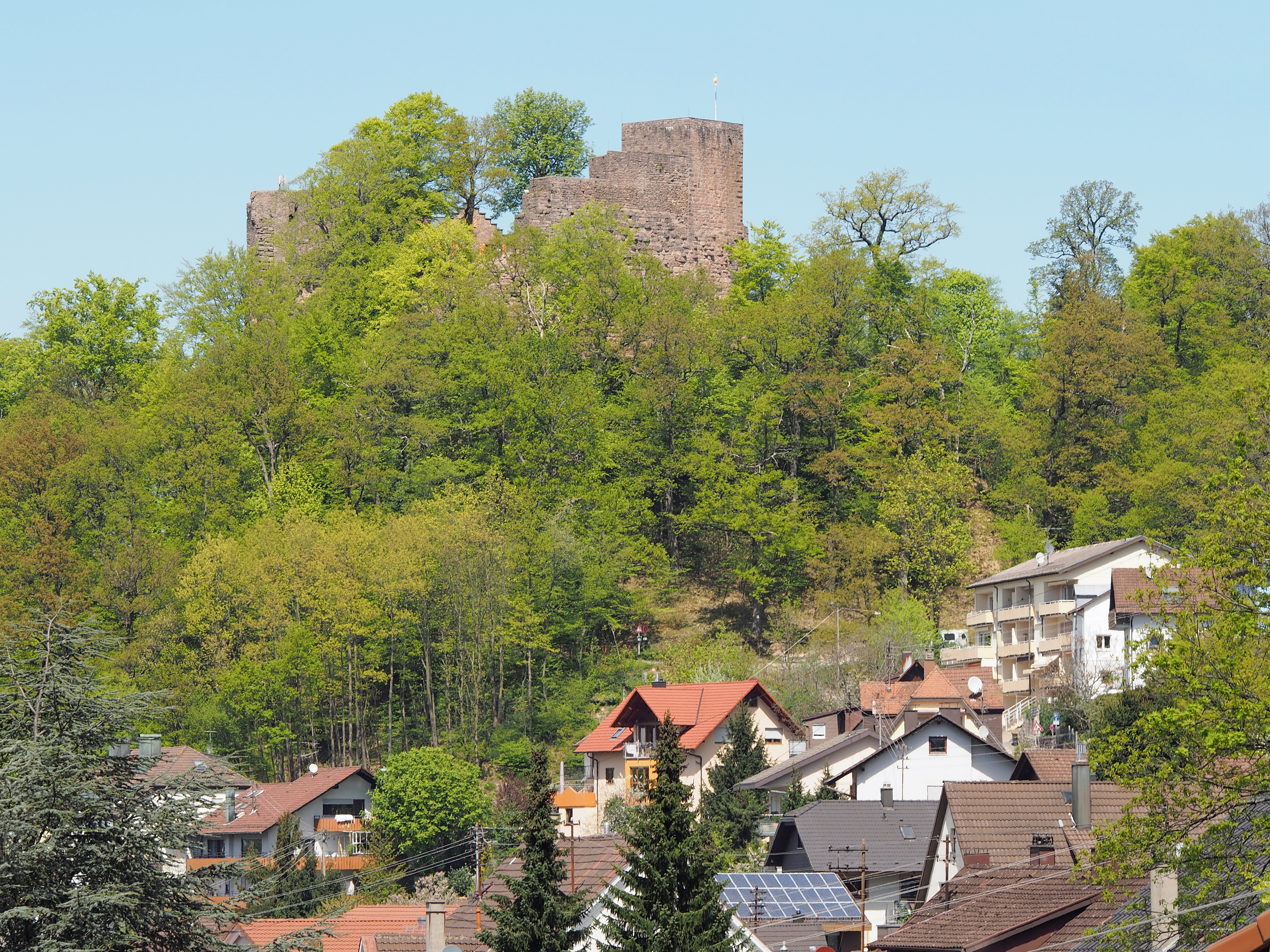
Ebersteinburg and Alt Eberstein castle

By 1100CE the Counts of Eberstein had taken up residence and constructed Alt Eberstein on top of the hill. Today only the bergfried and shield wall remain intact.

The village itself lies south of the ruins of Alt Eberstein. When the castle fell into decline, the stones were used in the district.

Trails lead from the village to Battert and to Hohenbaden Castle as well as Mount Merkur. These trails and walks are used frequently year-round by both locals and visitors.
