= Sibylle of Baden =

Sybille of Baden
- Countess of Hanau-Lichtenberg
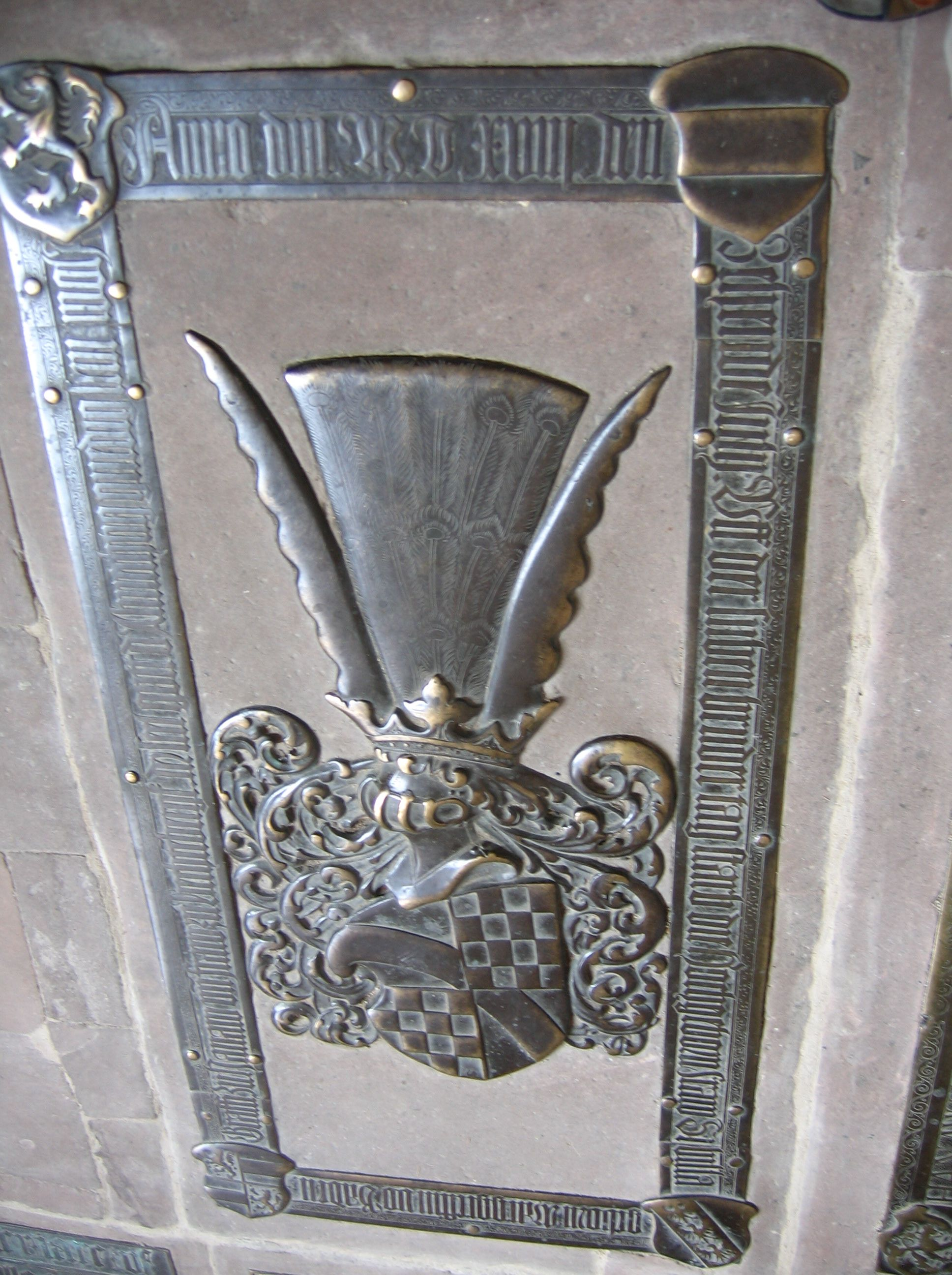
- Grave stone of Sibylle in the City Church of St. Nicholas in Babenhausen
- Born: 26 April 1485
- Died: 10 July 1518 (aged 33); Willstätt
- Buried: City Church of St. Nicholas in Babenhausen
- Noble family: House of Zähringen
- Spouse: Philipp III of Hanau-Lichtenberg
- Father: Christopher I of Baden
- Mother: Ottilie von Katzenelnbogen

Sibylle of Baden (26 April 1485 – 10 July 1518 in Willstätt) was a Margravine of Baden by birth and by marriage, Countess of Hanau-Lichtenberg. She was a daughter of Margrave Christopher I of Baden and his wife, Countess Ottilie von Katzenelnbogen, the daughter of Philip the Younger of Katzenelnbogen and thus a granddaughter of Philipp I of Katzenelnbogen.

== Marriage and issue ==
Sibylle married on 24 January 1505 to Count Philipp III of Hanau-Lichtenberg (18 October 1482 – 15 May 1538). She brought a dowry of 5000 guilders into the marriage. They had six children:

1. Johanna (1507 – 27 January 1572 at Eberstein Castle in Gernsbach), married on 6 November 1522 to Count Wilhelm IV of Eberstein (3 May 1497 – 1 July 1562).
2. Christophora (1509 – 7 March 1582), a nun in Marienborn Abbey from November 1526, and later the last abbess there.
3. Amalie (1512 – 5 February 1578), also a nun in Marienborn Abbey from November 1526.
4. Felicitas (5 March 1513 – November 1513).
5. Philipp IV (20 October 1514 – 19 February 1590), Count of Hanau-Lichtenberg.
6. Felicitas (1516 – 27 August 1551), also a nun in Marienborn Abbey from November 1526.

== Altar in Babenhausen ==
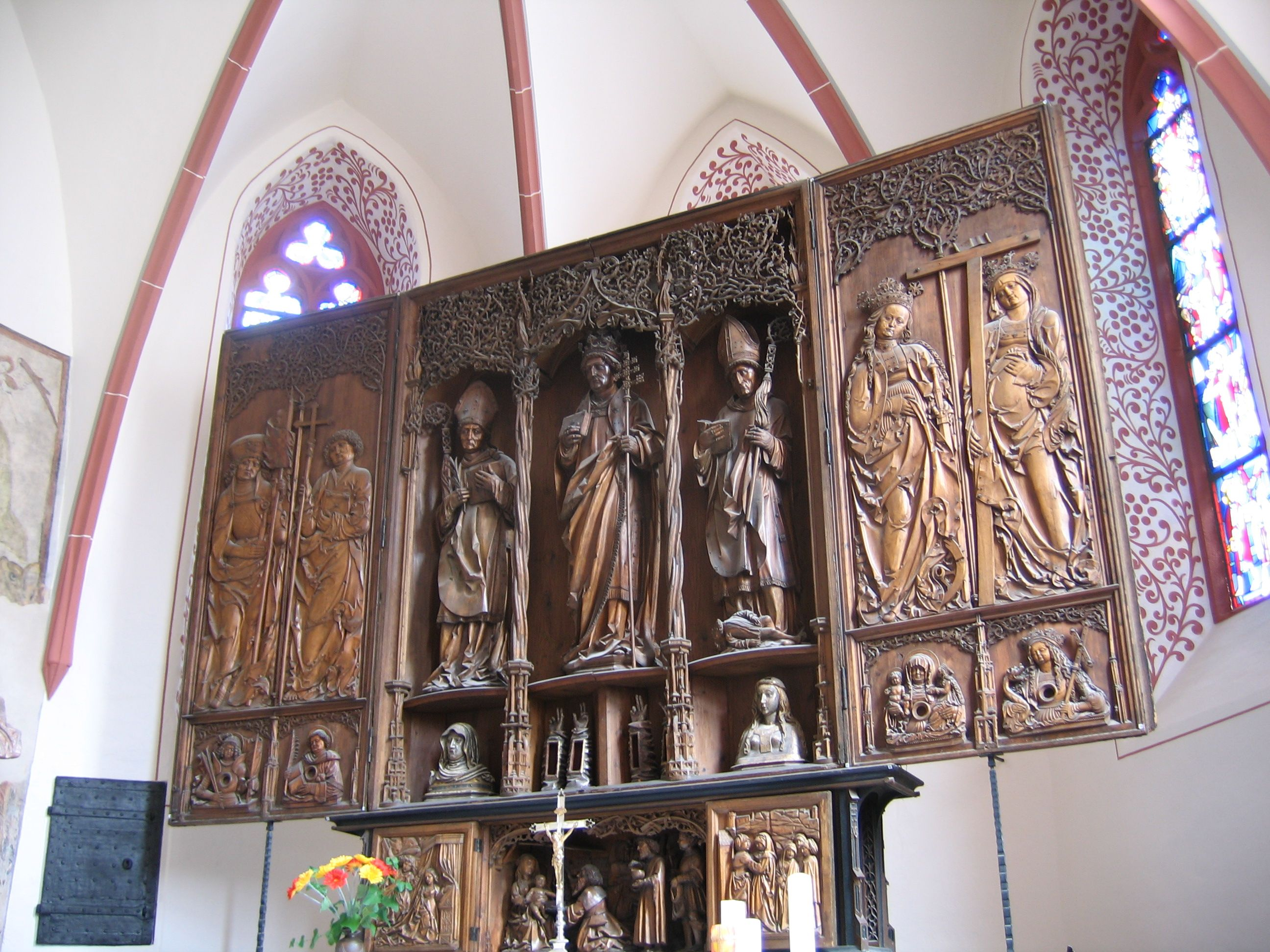
High altar in the Church of Babenhausen, donated by Sibylle of Baden.

By 1513, Sibylle had given birth to four daughters, but no son. She vowed that she would donate an altar if she had a son. In 1514, Philipp was born and Sibylle donated a high altar to the City Church of St. Nicholas in Babenhausen. This altar is considered a major work of art from the Middle Rhine area in this period (artist unknown). With this artist, Sibylle created a monument to herself and her relatives. The left wing of the altar depicts, among other people, her great-uncle, the blessed Bernard II, who was famous for his pious life and was beatified in the 18th century.

== Death ==
Sibylle died on 10 July 1518 and was buried in the family crypt of the Hanau-Lichtenberg dynasty in the City Church of St. Nicholas in Babenhausen, where her husband was later buried.

== Ancestors ==
Ancestors of Sibylle of Baden

16. Bernard I of Baden-Baden
8. Jacob, Margrave of Baden-Baden
17. Anna von Oettingen
4. Charles I of Baden-Baden
18. Charles II of Lorraine
9. Catherine de Lorraine
19. Margaret of the Palatinate
2. Christopher I of Baden
20. Leopold III, Duke of Austria
10. Ernest, Duke of Austria
21. Viridis Visconti
5. Katherine of Austria
22. Siemowit IV of Masovia
11. Cymburgis of Masovia
23. Alexandra of Lithuania
1. Sibylle of Baden
24. Johann IV of Katzenelnbogen
12. Philipp I of Katzenelnbogen
25. Anna von Katzenelnbogen
6. Philipp II of Katzenelnbogen
26. Eberhard IV of Württemberg
13. Anna of Württemberg
27. Henriette of Montbéliard
3. Ottilie von Katzenelnbogen
28. Engelbert I of Nassau
14. Henry II of Nassau-Siegen
29. Johanna van Polanen
7. Ottilie of Nassau-Siegen
30. Rupert IV of Virneburg
15. Genoveva of Virneburg
31. Agnes of Solms-Braunfels
