= Philipp III of Hanau-Lichtenberg =

Philipp III
- Born: 18 October 1482
- Died: 15 May 1538 (aged 55); Bouxwiller
- Buried: St. Nikolaus Church in Babenhausen
- Noble family: House of Hanau
- Spouse: Sibylle of Baden
- Father: Philipp II, Count of Hanau-Lichtenberg
- Mother: Anna of Isenburg-Büdingen

Philipp III of Hanau-Lichtenberg (18 October 1482 – 15 May 1538, Bouxwiller (German: Buchsweiler)) was the third Count of Hanau-Lichtenberg.

== Childhood and youth ==
Philipp III was the eldest son of Count Philipp II of Hanau-Lichtenberg and his wife Anna of Isenburg-Büdingen.

During the War of the Succession of Landshut (1503–1505) between Bavaria and the Electorate of the Palatinate, Philipp's father had remained neutral. Philipp, however, had sided with the Palatinate and against his father. The Palatinate side lost the war and an imperial ban was issued by the King of the Romans and later Emperor, Maximilian I, against their leaders, who were accused of breaching the peace. Wilhelm II, Landgrave of Hesse was tasked with enforcing this ban. He destroyed the rural district of Babenhausen before Philipp II managed, with Maximilian I's help, and the fact that Babenhausen, as a Bohemian fief, indirectly belonged to the Habsburg family, to curb the campaign against his possessions. Nevertheless, Maximilian I resented Philipp III for having fought on the losing side.

== Government ==
Due to his siding with the Palatinate during the Landshut War of Succession, Count Philipp III was under an imperial ban when he succeeded his father in 1504. The final settlement of the war at the Diet of Cologne in 1505 required him to assign his half share in the condominium of Groß-Umstadt and Otzberg Castle to the Landgraviate of Hesse, as compensation for Hesse's war costs. After this settlement, the situation calmed down and the imperial ban was lifted. In 1506, he was again enfeoffed with the district of Babenhausen by King Maximilian I of Bohemia and he was even appointed as an imperial councillor. Nearly two decades later, in 1521, he was partly compensated by Hesse and the Palatinate for his losses after the Landshut War of Succession, with Kleestadt and Langstadt and cash payment of 16000florins. So in the end, his losses were not that big.

Philipp III had to share his inheritance with his younger brothers Ludwig and Reinhard. They decided not to divide the county. In 1513, Ludwig received the district of Buchsweiler, but he later swapped it for an annual pension of 500 florins plus the right to use the Hanau-Lichtenberg residence in Strasbourg. Some territory was assigned to Reinhard, but this fell back to Philipp III when Reinhard died.

After long negotiations, Philipp reached an agreement with his relatives of the House of Zweibrücken-Bitsch. The condominia of Willstätt and Brumath were divided, with Hanau-Lichtenberg receiving Willstätt and Zweibrücken-Bitsch receiving Brumath.

The German Peasants' War also happened during Philipp's reign. On behalf of the Palatinate, he fought against farmers in the Hettgau region, including his own subjects. At the same time, he took advantage of the unrest and invaded the monastery at Neuwiller-lès-Saverne and plundered it. The situation slipped out of his control and on 6 May 1525, farmers looted his castle in Bouxwiller. He had to call in Duke Antoine of Lorraine for help. Antoine defeated the peasants and the 18 municipalities of the Buchsweiler district submitted themselves to Philipp III again. They were sentenced to heavy fines and had to swear a new oath of allegiance. They also had to abandon their weapons and gatherings were banned.

Philipp III was not squeamish. For example, Albrecht von Berwangen, one of his officials, had gone on strike, because his salary had not been paid. Philipp had killed Albrecht and had to answer to murder charges before both the Aulic Council and the Reichskammergericht. He pleaded self-defense – not very credible because of the mangled condition of the corpse. Philipp was sentenced to a fine of 500 florins. The victim's brother felt that that was not enough. He declared a feud on Philipp and allied himself with Franz von Sickingen. Together, they looted the Hanau-Lichtenberg village of Duntzenheim.

Philipp also had a never-ending series of disputes with the City of Strasbourg, due to their conflicting economic, religious and political interests.

He participated in the diets of Worms in 1521, Speyer in 1526 and Regensburg in 1532. He was imperial councillor under Maximilian I and Karl V and also Councillor to Archduke Ferdinand I, the Elector Palatine and the Duke of Württemberg.

In 1528 he founded a hospital in Buchsweiler. He also created an "endowment fund" to finance the hospital. This fund developed over the years in the largest bank in the county.

== Reformation ==
Under the reign of Count Philipp III, the Reformation slowly took hold in the County of Hanau-Lichtenberg from 1525 onwards. For example, the practice of Seelenamt was banned. On the other hand, Johannes Anglicus, who spread the new doctrine in the county, was sent into exile. Philipp III proceeded very carefully on this matter, because of the political consequences. Factors he was taking into account included the revolutionary ideas that had been spread among the peasants, his foreign policy, in particular with regard to the neighbouring Archbishopric of Mainz, his aversion to the bourgeois, Protestant Strasbourg and his wife, who was devoted uncompromisingly to the Roman-Catholic faith.

== Death ==
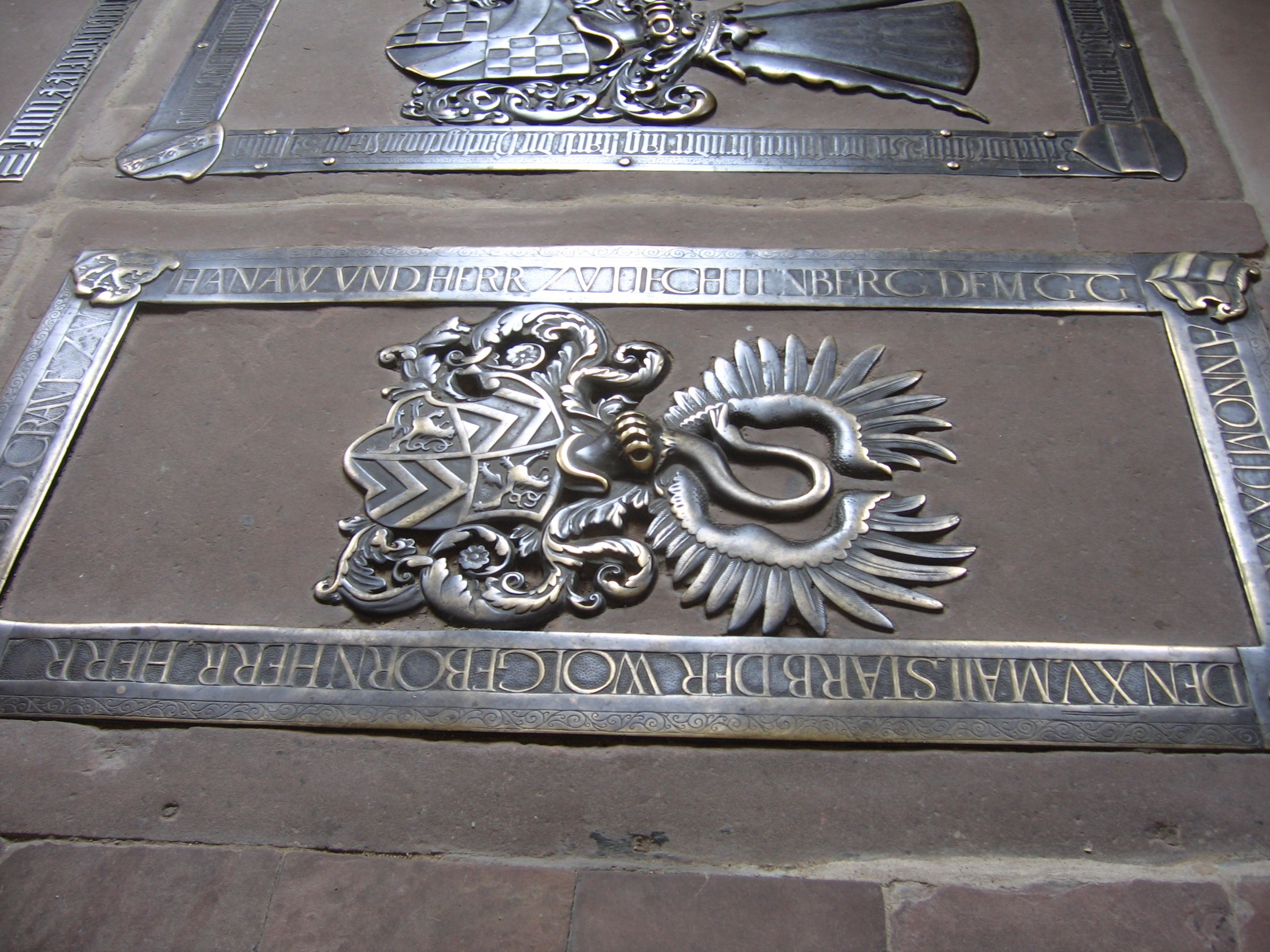
Grave slab of Philipp III of Hanau-Lichtenberg in the St. Nikolaus Church in Babenhausen

A few years before his death, Philipp III became ill and handed the reins of government to his son and successor, Philipp IV.

Philipp III died on 15 May 1538 in Buchsweiler and was buried in the family crypt in the St. Nikolaus Church in Babenhausen. His grave stone can still be seen in the church and his funeral shield is on display in the Palace Museum Darmstadt.

== Marriage and issue ==
Philipp III married on 24 . January 1504 in Baden-Baden with Margravine Sibylle of Baden (born: 26 April 1485; died: 10 July 1518), daughter of the Margrave Christoph I of Baden-Sponheim. She brought a dowry of 5000 florins into the marriage. They had six children:

1. Johanna (born: 1507; died: 27 January 1572 at Eberstein Castle in Gernsbach), married on 6 November 1522 Count Wilhelm IV of Eberstein (born: 3 May 1497; died: 1 July 1562).
2. Christophora (born: 1509, died: 7 March 1582), a nun from November 1526 and later the last nun abbess of Marienborn Abbey, reverted to secular status in 1559, after the dissolution of the monastery.
3. Amalia (born: 1512, died: 5 February 1578), nun in Marienborn Abbey from November 1526, secular after dissolution of the monastery in 1559, buried on 7 February 1578 in the St. Nikolaus church in Babenhausen.
4. Felicitas (born: 5 March 1513; died: November 1513).
5. Philipp IV (born: 20 October 1514; died: 19 February 1590).
6. Felicitas (born: 1516; died: 27 August 1551? at Babenhausen or, according to other sources, after 1559), nun in Marienborn Abbey from November 1526.

== Ancestors ==
Ancestors of Philipp III of Hanau-Lichtenberg

8. Reinhard II, Count of Hanau (1369–1451)
4. Philipp I, Count of Hanau-Lichtenberg (1417–1480)
9. Katharina of Nassau-Beilstein (d. 1459)
2. Philipp II, Count of Hanau-Lichtenberg (1462–1504)
10. Ludwig V of Lichtenberg (1433–1471)
5. Anna of Lichtenberg (1442–1474)
11. Elisabeth of Hohenlohe (d. 1488)
1. Philipp III, Count of Hanau-Lichtenberg
12. Dietrich of Isenburg-Büdingen (1386–1461)
6. Ludwig II of Isenburg-Büdingen (1422–1511)
13. Elisabeth of Solms-Braunfels (1403–1450)
3. Anna of Isenburg-Büdingen (d. 1522)
14. John II, Count of Nassau-Wiesbaden-Idstein (1419–1480)
7. Maria of Nassau-Wiesbaden-Idstein (1438–1480)
15. Maria of Nassau-Dillenburg (1418–1474)

== References and sources ==
- Johannes Beinert: Der Zug Straßburgs gegen Graf Philipp III. von Hanau-Lichtenberg, in: Jahrbuch für Geschichte, Sprache und Literatur Elsaß-Lothringens, vol. 24, 1908, p. 33 ff
- M. Goltzené: Aus der Geschichte des Amtes Buchsweiler, in: Pay d'Alsace, vol. 111/112, p. 64 ff
- J. G. Lehmann: Urkundliche Geschichte der Grafschaft Hanau-Lichtenberg im unteren Elsasse. two vols., 1862 (?), reprinted Pirmasens, 1970.
- Wilhelm Morhardt: Hanau alt's - in Ehren b'halt's - Die Grafen von Hanau-Lichtenberg in Geschichte und Geschichten = Babenhausen einst und jetzt, vol. 10, Babenhausen, 1984
- Sebastian Scholz: Die Inschriften der Stadt Darmstadt und des Landkreises Darmstadt-Dieburg und Groß-Gerau = Die Deutschen Inschriften vol. 49, Mainzer Reihe vol. 6, edited by the Akademie der Wissenschaften Mainz, Wiesbaden, 1999.
- Sebastian Scholz: Ein Totenschild für Graf Philipp III. von Hanau-Lichtenberg, in: Beiträge zur Geschichte der Grafschaft Hanau-Lichtenberg. Herausgegeben zum 20-jährigen Jubiläum der Partnerschaft zwischen den beiden ehemaligen gräflichen Residenzstädten Babenhausen und Bouxwiller = Babenhausen einst und jetzt, vol. 31, 2004, p. 31 ff
- Reinhard Suchier: Genealogie des Hanauer Grafenhauses. In: Festschrift des Hanauer Geschichtsvereins zu seiner fünfzigjährigen Jubelfeier am 27. August 1894, Hanau, 1894
- Ernst J. Zimmermann: Hanau Stadt und Land, third edition, Hanau, 1919, reprinted 1978

== Footnotes ==
Philipp III of Hanau-Lichtenberg House of Hanau Born: 18 October 1482 Died: 15 May 1538
Preceded by Philipp II	Count of Hanau-Lichtenberg; 1504–1538	Succeeded by Philipp IV
