= Ludwig of Hanau-Lichtenberg =

German nobleman

- Born: 5 October 1487; Buchsweiler
- Died: 3 December 1553 (aged 66); Willstätt
- Buried: St. Adelphi church in Neuweiler
- Noble family: House of Hanau
- Father: Philipp II, Count of Hanau-Lichtenberg
- Mother: Anna of Isenburg-Büdingen

Ludwig of Hanau-Lichtenberg (5 October 1487 in Buchsweiler – 3 December 1553) was a German nobleman. He was a younger son of Count Philipp II and his wife Anna of Isenburg-Büdingen.

== Clerical offices ==
Following the medieval tradition, he joined the clergy. This tradition was meant to ensure that only one son — usually the eldest — would inherit the entire county, while his brothers derived an adequate income from their clerical offices. This way, the territorial intergrety of the county could remain intact. The alternative would be to divide the county among all brothers, which would lead to fragmentation. After a few generations, the fragments would be too small to provide their rulers with an adequate income, and their sovereignty would come into question. Giving a younger son an appanage or only an annual allowance was not yet generally considered acceptable in the 16th century (although this would be common practice later). Another consideration was that the clergy did not marry; marrying a befitting noblewoman was expensive, as such ladies were entitled to a large dower, and a wittum if they were widowed.

Ludwig, and his brother Reinhard initially waived their rights and received an annual pension and compensation in kind.

Ludwig studie law at several universities and received his degree in Bologna. He then became a canon in Strasbourg. For unknown reasons, he resigned from this post in 1513. It has been observed elsewhere that is this period, shortly before the Reformation, clerical offices became less attractive as a source of income for the nobility. After Ludwig' resignation, his brother Philipp III provided him with the district of Buchsweiler as an apanage. However, one year later, he returned the district to his brother, arguing that it would be better if a single person were to administer the whole county. The exact reason for this act cannot be inferred from the sparse sources. Nevertheless, a change in thinking during the transition from the Middle Ages to the Early Modern Period is clearly in evidence.

In 1518, he received a château in Willstätt as his residence. In 1519, Elector Palatine Louis V appointed him Judex vicariatus in the Reichskammergericht.

Ludwig died on 3 December 1553 and was buried in the St. Adelphi church in Neuweiler.

== Issue ==
Ludwig never married, he had extramarital relations, possibly with two women. One of them was named Agnes, the other came from Rumpenheim. It is also possible, that these two descriptions describe the same person, i.e. a woman named Agnes who came from Rumpeheim. He had at least two illegitimate daughters, named Felicitas and Agnes.

There was also an illegitimate Caspar of Hanau, but it's not clear whether this Caspar was a son of Ludwig or his father Philipp. Caspar had a son named Philipp Ludwig (d. 3 August 1612).

== Ancestors ==
Ancestors of Ludwig of Hanau-Lichtenberg

8. Reinhard II, Count of Hanau (1369–1451)
4. Philipp I, Count of Hanau-Lichtenberg (1417–1480)
9. Katharina of Nassau-Beilstein (d. 1459)
2. Philipp II, Count of Hanau-Lichtenberg (1462–1504)
10. Ludwig V of Lichtenberg (1433–1471)
5. Anna of Lichtenberg (1442–1474)
11. Elisabeth of Hohenlohe (d. 1488)
1. Ludwig of Hanau-Lichtenberg
12. Dietrich of Isenburg-Büdingen (1386–1461)
6. Ludwig II of Isenburg-Büdingen (1422–1511)
13. Elisabeth of Solms-Braunfels (1403–1450)
3. Anna of Isenburg-Büdingen (d. 1522)
14. John II, Count of Nassau-Wiesbaden-Idstein (1419–1480)
7. Maria of Nassau-Wiesbaden-Idstein (1438–1480)
15. Maria of Nassau-Dillenburg (1418–1474)
