= Von Zimmern =

Coat of arms of Counts von Zimmern

The von Zimmern family (Herren von Zimmern), after 1538 counts (Grafen) of Zimmern, was a Swabian noble family. The family is first mentioned in 1080, and its male line was extinct in 1594. Their name is now mostly known from the Zimmern Chronicle, written in the mid 16th century by count Froben Christoph von Zimmern.

Their original domain was in the Black Forest, in part of the modern Rottweil district. Their original castle was Herrenzimmern near Bösingen (ruined since the 17th century). In 1415, the von Zimmern acquired Wildenstein Castle.

In 1488, the escalation of the Werdenberg feud, Johannes Werner the elder fell under imperial ban and most of the von Zimmern possessions was given to the Werdenberger lords of Sigmaringen; the possessions were eventually regained, by Johannes Werners's son, Johannes Werner the younger, in 1503. In 1508, the von Zimmern possessions were divided into three parts.

The family reached the peak of its influence in 1538, when they were elevated to the rank of count (Graf). It was extinct in 1594 with the death of Wilhelm von Zimmern, only son of Froben Christoph von Zimmern.

== Known family members ==
- Katharina von Zimmern (1478-1547), last abbess of the Fraumünster Abbey
