= Philipp II of Hanau-Lichtenberg =

Philipp II, Count of Hanau-Lichtenberg
- Born: 31 May 1462; Hanau, County of Hanau
- Died: 22 August 1504 (aged 42); Babenhausen, County of Hanau-Lichtenberg
- Noble family: House of Hanau
- Spouse: Anna of Isenburg-Büdingen
- Father: Philipp I, Count of Hanau-Lichtenberg

Philipp II of Hanau-Lichtenberg (born 31 May 1462 in Hanau; died: 22 August 1504 in Babenhausen) ruled the County of Hanau-Lichtenberg from 1480 until his death.

== Early life ==
Philipp II was born on 31 May 1462 between 21:00 and 22:00, as the second son of the Count Philipp I, the Elder of Hanau-Babenhausen and his wife, Anna of Lichtenberg. He was baptized three days after the birth, in the St. Mary's Church in Hanau. His godparents were Konrad Brelle, abbot of Selbold Abbey, Wenceslaus of Cleves and Meze of Gemmingen, the widow of Eber-hard Waißen.

His older brother, Johann, died young, so that Philipp succeeded his father as Count of Hanau-Babenhausen.

== Family ==
=== Marriage and issue ===
He married on 9 September 1480 with Anna of Isenburg-Büdingen (d. 1522). A papal dispensation had been necessary for this marriage because they were related to each other in the fourth degree. They had the following children:

1. Philipp III (18 October 1482 – 15 May 1538).
2. Anna (1485 – 11 October 1559), a nun in the Marienborn Abbey
3. Margaret (1486 – 6 August 1560 in Babenhausen), also nun in the Marienborn Abbey, interned for life at Babenhausen Castle, because of a "slip". She was buried in the St. Nikolaus church in Babenhausen.
4. Ludwig (born: 5 October 1487 in Buchsweiler; died: 3 December 1553 in Willstätt; buried in the St. Adelphi church in Neuweiler), unmarried clergyman
5. Maria (born: c. 1487; died: probably 1526), abbess of Klarenthal Abbey from 1512 to 1525
6. Amalia (born: 7 June 1490 in Buchsweiler; died 11 March 1552 in Pfaffenhoffen; buried in the St. Adelphi church in Neuweiler), a nun
7. Reinhard (born: 19 February 1494 in Klingenberg am Main; died in Buchsweiler; buried in the St. Adelphi in Neuweiler), joined the clergy

=== Ancestors ===
Ancestors of Philipp II of Hanau-Lichtenberg

8. Ulrich IV, Lord of Hanau (c. 1330-1380)
4. Reinhard II, Count of Hanau (1369–1451)
9. Elisabeth of Wertheim (1347–1378)
2. Philipp I, Count of Hanau-Lichtenberg (1417–1480)
10. Henry II, Count of Nassau-Beilstein (d. 1412)
5. Katharina of Nassau-Beilstein (d. 1459)
11. Katharina of Randerode (d. 1415)
1. Philipp II, Count of Hanau-Lichtenberg
12. Ludwig IV of Lichtenberg (1387–1434)
6. Ludwig V of Lichtenberg (1433–1471)
13. Anna of Baden (1399–1421)
3. Anna of Lichtenberg (1442–1474)
14. Albrecht I of Hohenlohe (1370–1429)
7. Elisabeth of Hohenlohe (d. 1488)
15. Elisabeth of Hanau (d. 1475)

== Footnotes ==
Philipp II of Hanau-Lichtenberg House of Hanau Born: 31 May 1462 Died: 22 August 1504
Preceded by Philipp I	Count of Hanau-Lichtenberg; 1489–1504	Succeeded by Philipp III
