= Anna of Isenburg-Büdingen =

German noblewoman

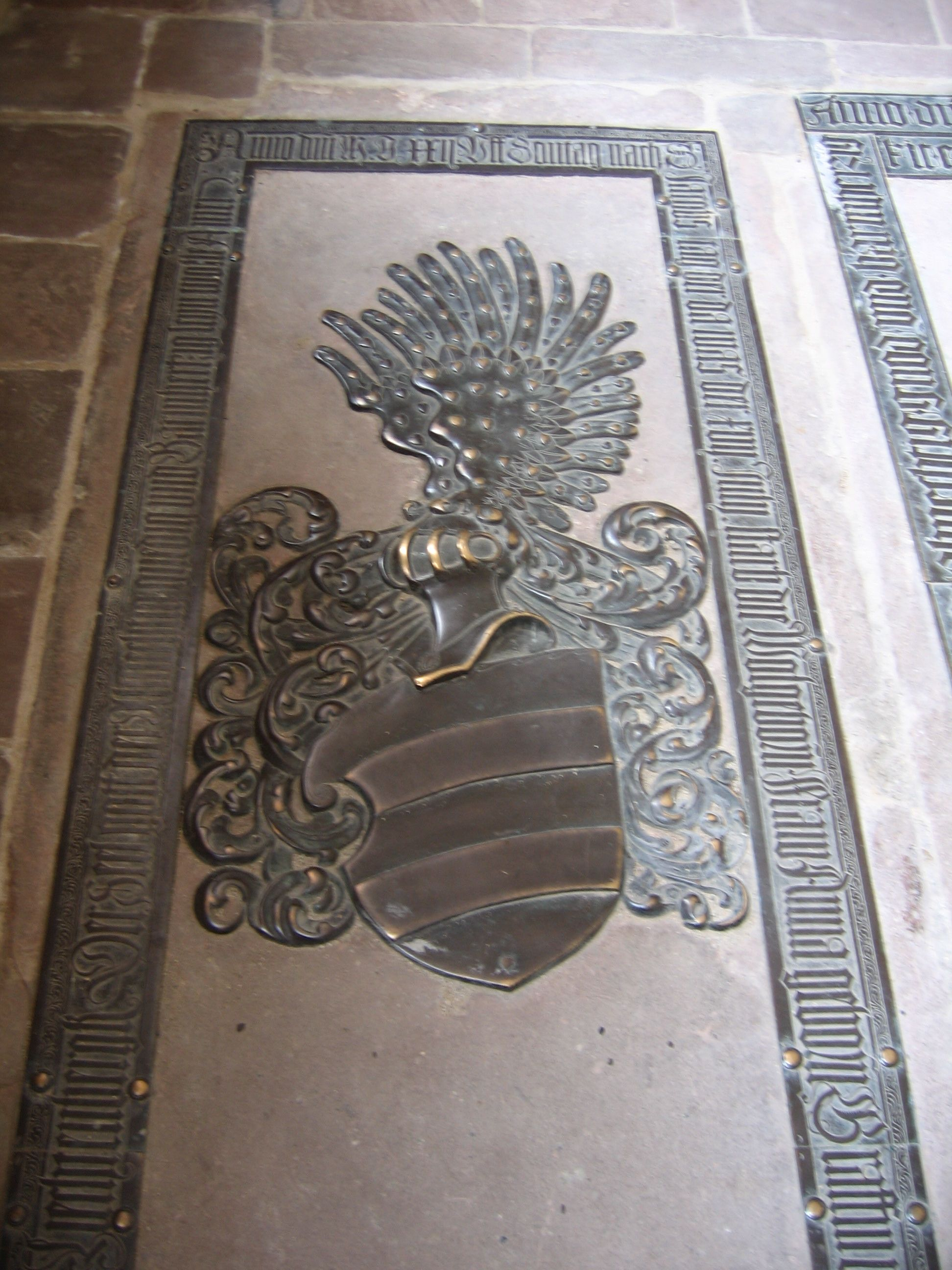
- Anna's grave in the St. Nicholas church in Babenhausen
- Born: 1460
- Died: 27 July 1522; Babenhausen
- Buried: St. Nicholas church in Babenhausen
- Noble family: House of Isenburg
- Spouse: Philipp II, Count of Hanau-Lichtenberg
- Father: Louis II of Isenburg-Büdingen
- Mother: Maria of Nassau-Wiesbaden-Idstein

Anna of Isenburg-Büdingen (1460 – 27 July 1522 in Babenhausen) was a German noblewoman. She was a daughter of Count Louis II of Isenburg-Büdingen and Countess Maria of Nassau-Wiesbaden-Idstein.

== Life ==
She married Philipp II, Count of Hanau-Lichtenberg on 9 September 1480. She needed a papal dispensation for her marriage, because she was a fourth degree relative of Philip. She brought a dowry of 4500 guilders into the marriage. She received a dower of 1000 guilders and a jointure of 450 guilders annually from the revenue of Schaafheim Castle. They both renounced their claims on the Lordship of Büdingen.

Anna died on 27 July 1522 and was buried in the St. Nicholas church in Babenhausen, in front of the altar.

== Issue ==
Anna and Philip had the following children together:

1. Philip III (18 October 1482 – 15 May 1538).
2. Anna (1485 – 11 October 1559), a nun in the Marienborn Abbey
3. Margaret (1486 – 6 August 1560 in Babenhausen), also nun in the Marienborn Abbey, interned for life at Babenhausen Castle, because of a "slip". She was buried in the St. Nicholas church in Babenhausen.
4. Ludwig (5 October 1487 in Buchsweiler – 3 December 1553 in Willstätt; buried in the St. Adelphi church in Neuweiler), unmarried clergyman
5. Maria (c. 1487; – probably 1526), abbess of Klarenthal Abbey from 1512 to 1525
6. Amalia (7 June 1490 in Buchsweiler – 11 March 1552 in Pfaffenhoffen; buried in the St. Adelphi church in Neuweiler), a nun
7. Reinhard (19 February 1494 in Klingenberg am Main – 7 June 1490 in Buchsweiler; buried in the St. Adelphi in Neuweiler), joined the clergy
