= County of Eberstein =

State of the Holy Roman Empire (1085–1660)

County of Eberstein Grafschaft Eberstein
- 1085–1660
- Coat of arms
- Status: County
- Capital: Alt Eberstein^{a} Neu Eberstein^{b} 48°44.97′N 8°20.6′E
- Historical era: Middle Ages
  - Established: 1085
  - Sold land to Baden: 1387
  - Comital line extinct, to Speyer and Württemberg: 1660
Preceded by
Ufgau
Succeeded by
Margraviate of Baden
Bishopric of Speyer
Duchy of Württemberg
- a: Alt Eberstein is in Ebersteinburg, now an outlying district of Baden-Baden. b: Neu Eberstein is now known as Schloss Eberstein, near Gernsbach.

The County of Eberstein was a territory within the Holy Roman Empire, situated in the southwest of modern Germany. From 1085 up into the 13th century, the Counts of Eberstein lived in the castle known today as Alt Eberstein which lies on a mountain top between the valleys of the rivers Murg and Oos (in Ebersteinburg, now an outlying district of Baden-Baden). They then moved to Neu Eberstein, today known as Schloss Eberstein, near Gernsbach.

From 1085, the counts were Vögte of Reichenbach Priory.

After the financial ruin of Wolf von Eberstein in 1387, half of the family possessions had to be sold to the Margraves of Baden. When the last male member of the family died in 1660, the remaining possessions were taken over by the bishopric of Speyer and by the duchy of Württemberg.

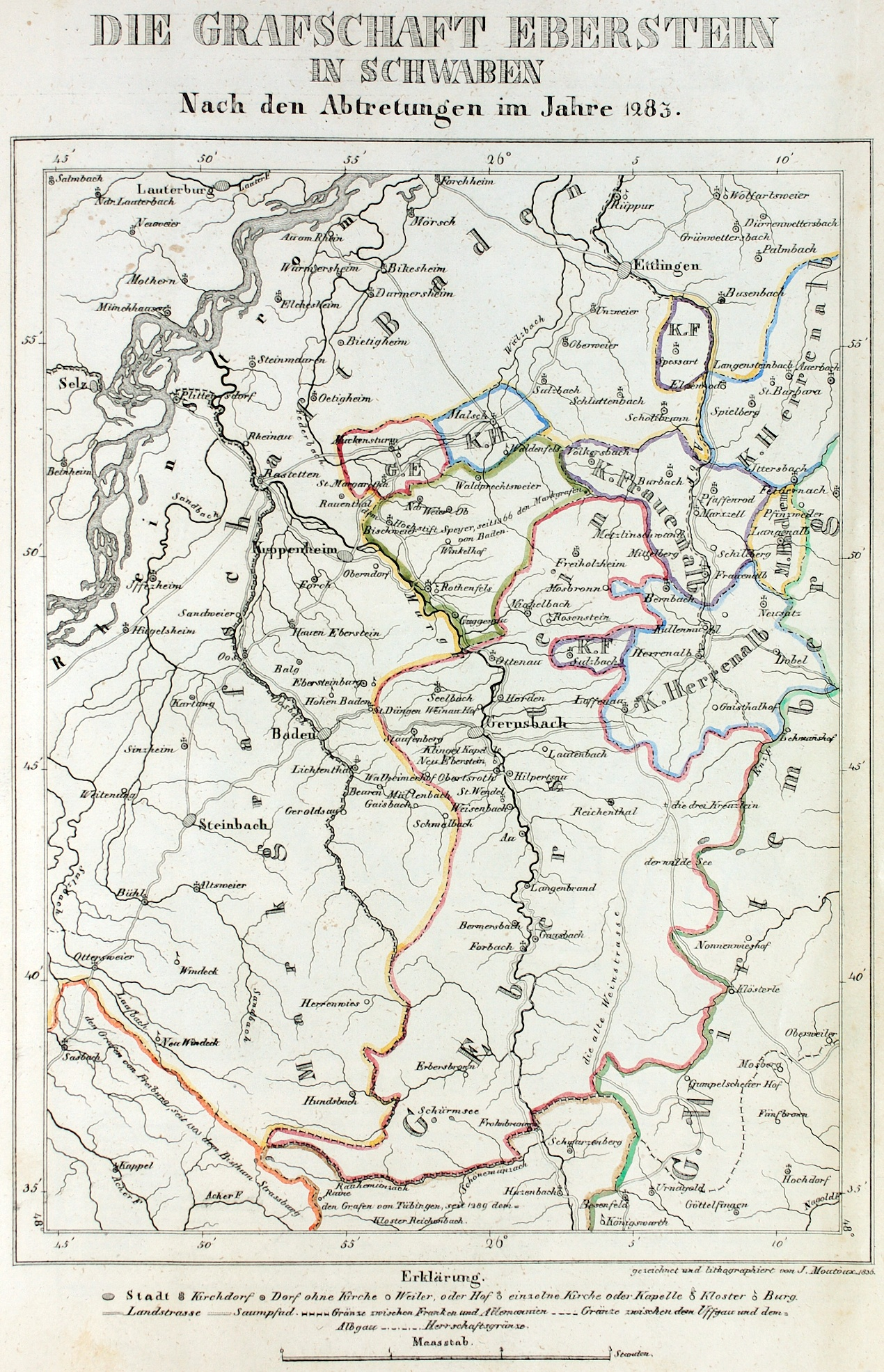
Map of the County of Eberstein in 1283

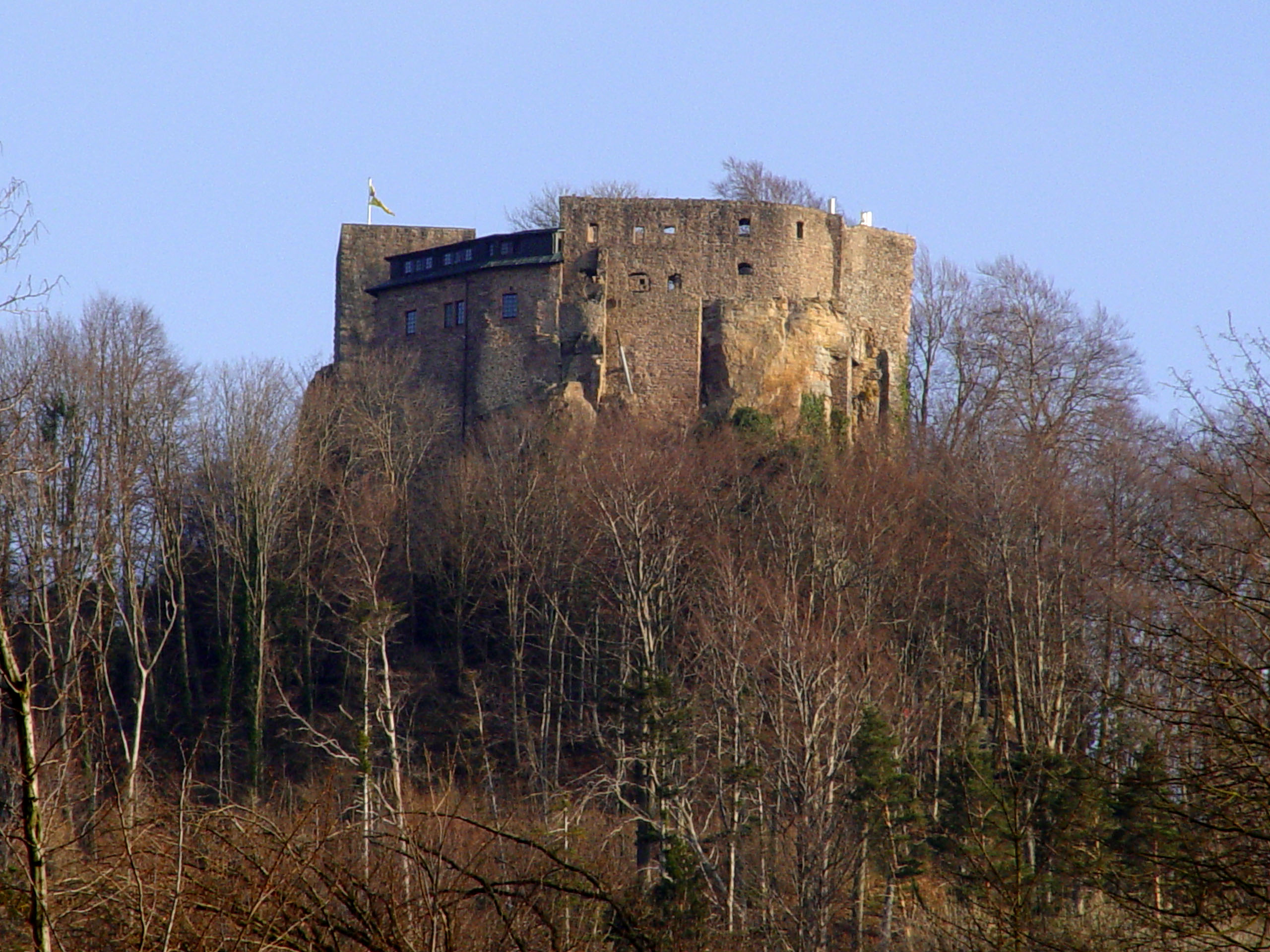
The ruins of Alt Eberstein castle

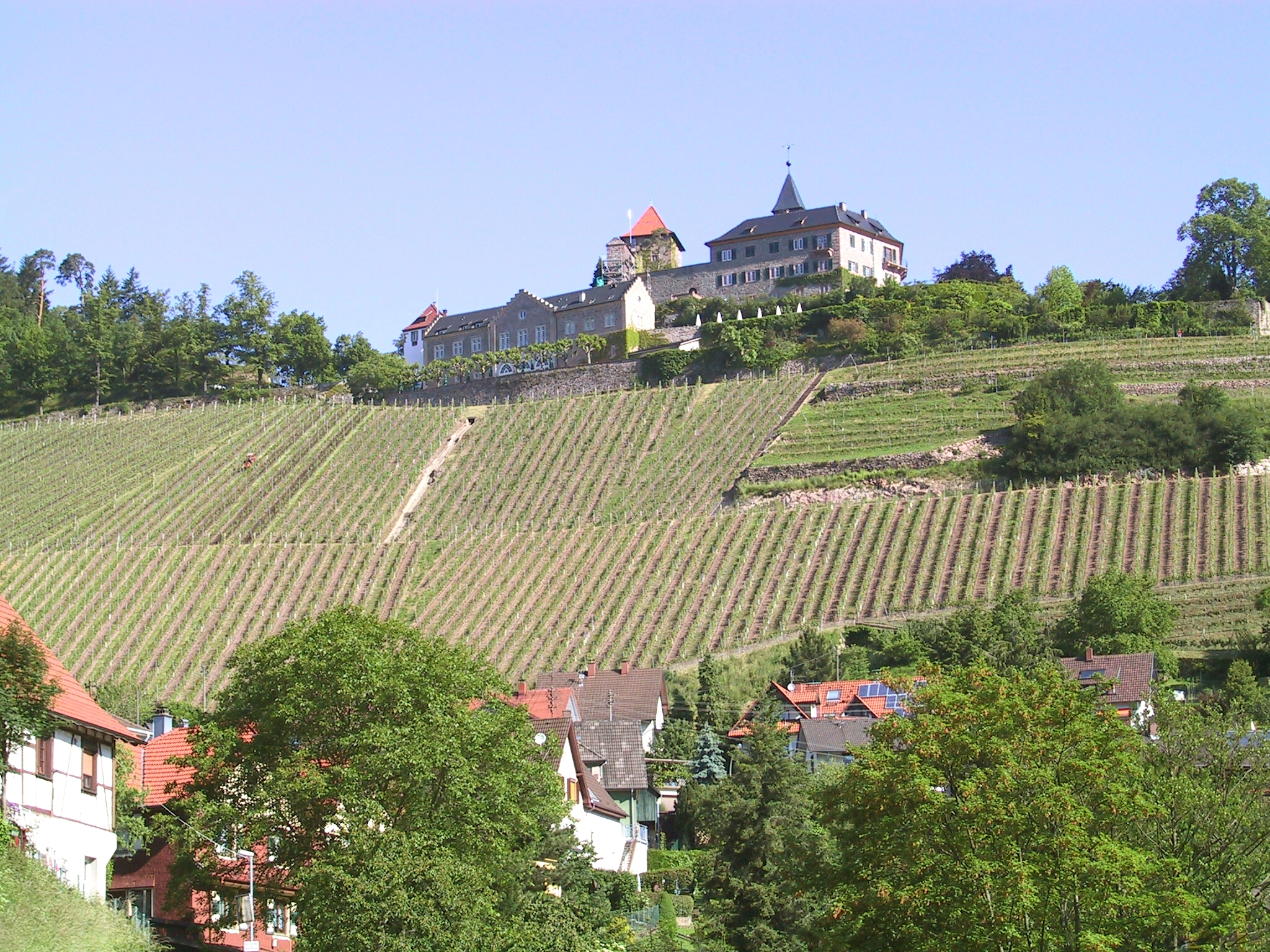
Schloss Eberstein near Gernsbach

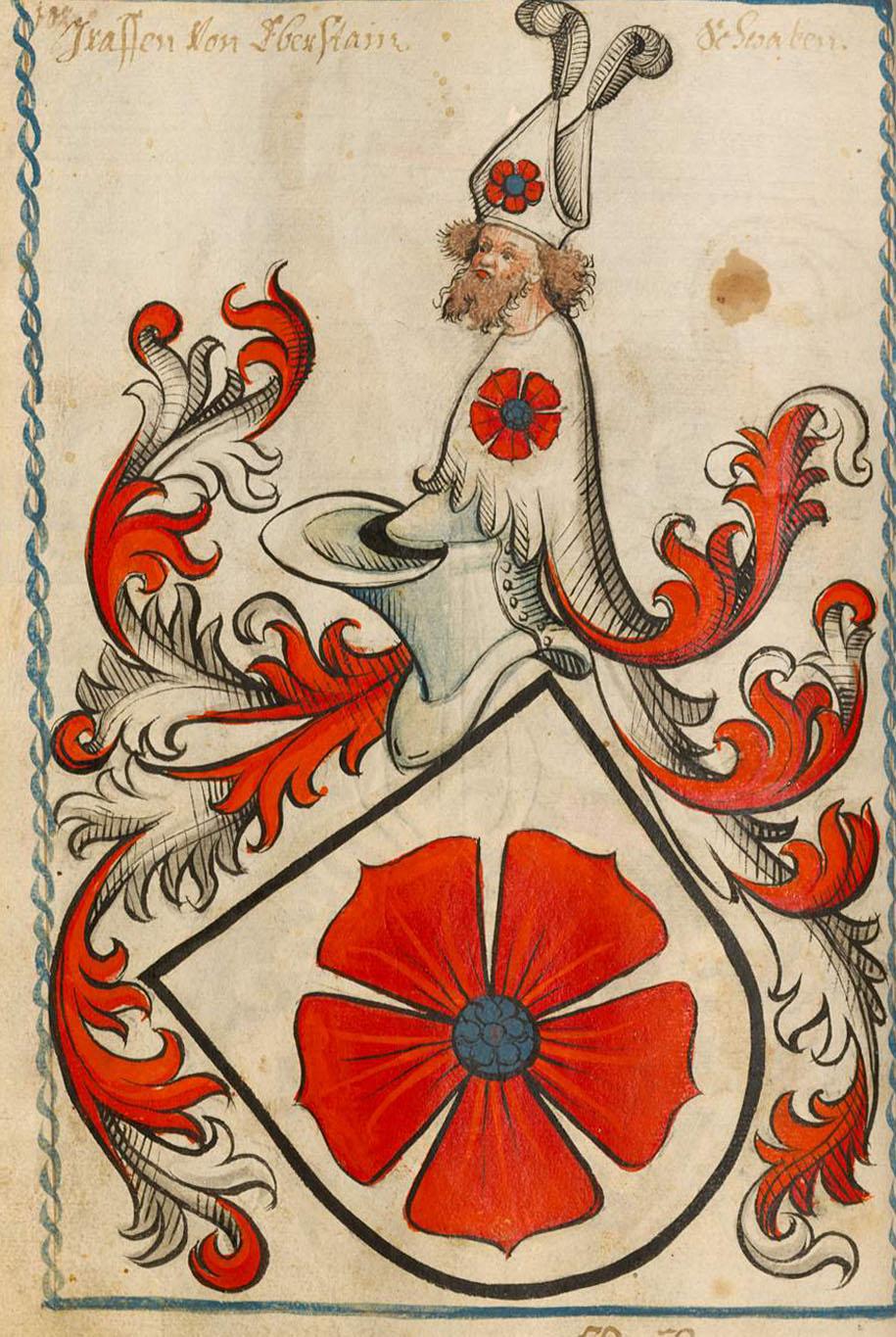
The original coat of arms of the Counts of Eberstein, dated 1450–80, from the Scheibler'sches Wappenbuch

The Counts of Eberstein from south-west Germany should not be confused with the Franconian lords of the same name with their ancestral home at Eberstein Castle near Hilders. Another medieval comital family were the counts of Everstein (sometimes also called Eberstein) from Lower Saxony with their ancestral home Everstein on the Burgberg (ridge).
