= Froben Christoph of Zimmern =

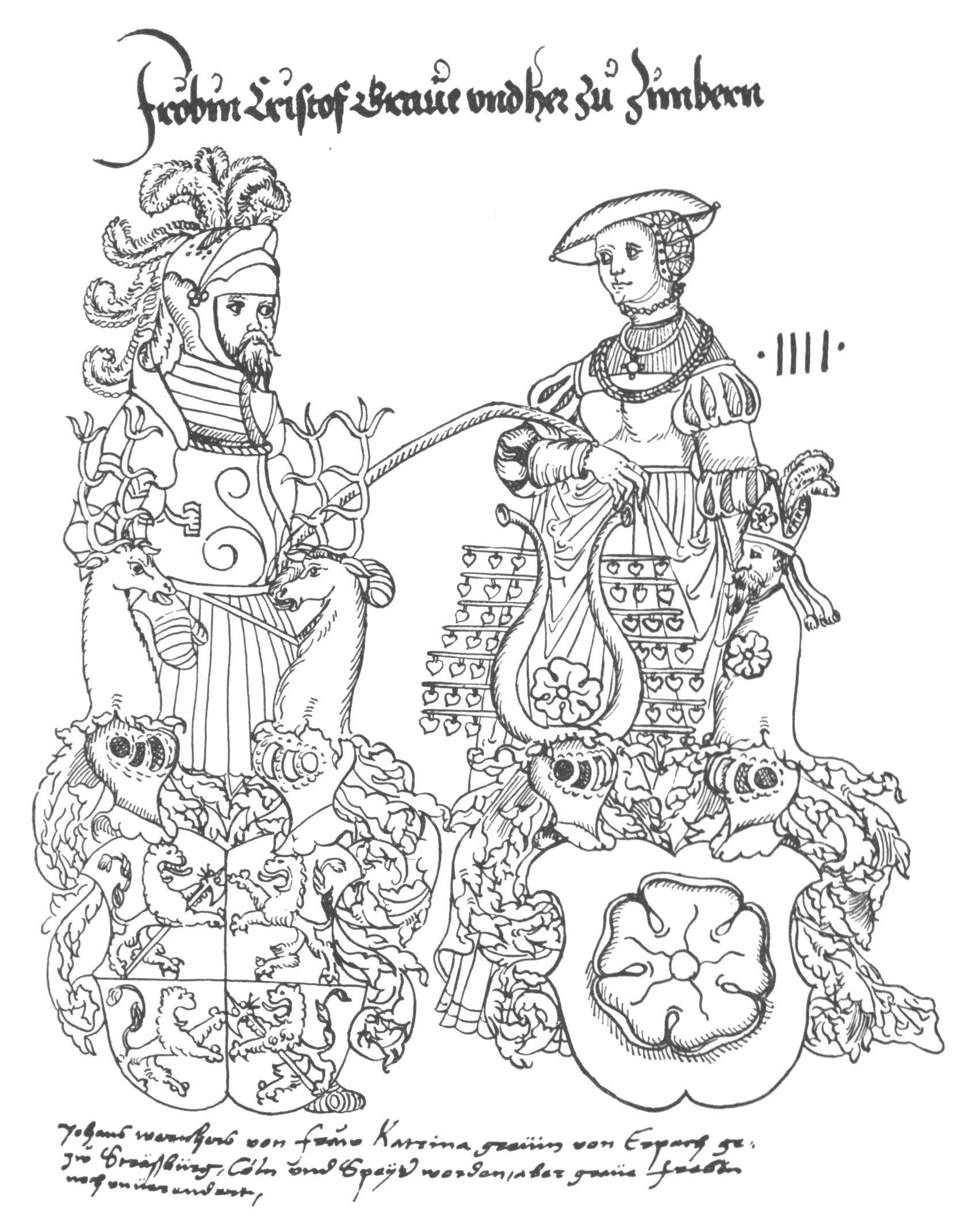
- Froben and his wife Kunigunde, with their heraldic achievements
- Born: 19 February 1519; Mespelbrunn Castle in the Spessart
- Died: 27 November 1566 (aged 47); Meßkirch
- Noble family: Zimmern
- Spouse: Kunigunde of Eberstein
- Father: Johann Werner of Zimmern the Younger
- Mother: Katharina of Erbach

Count Froben Christoph of Zimmern (19 February 1519 – 27 November 1566) was the author of the Zimmern Chronicle and a member of the von Zimmern family of Swabian nobility. This article is based primarily on Beat Rudolf Jenny's biography of him.

== Youth and student years ==
Froben Christoph was born at Mespelbrunn Castle in the Spessart as the son of Johann Werner and his wife Katharina of Erbach. He was raised there and in Aschaffenburg by his step-grandfather Philipp Echter and his grandmother, the Countess of Werdenberg.

He did not visit Meßkirch (Zimmern) until 1531. During a short stay at Falkenstein Castle, he had a conflict-charged meeting with his father. After that meeting, he moved in with his uncle Gottfried Werner in Meßkirch.

In 1533, Froben Christoph and his elder brother Johann began studying at the University of Tübingen. After a stay in Strasbourg, he studied from early 1534 to 1535 in Bourges. During the winter of 1536/37, he studied in Cologne, and from Easter 1537, without his brother, in Leuven, where he remained until July 1539.

After a short stay at home, the travelled to Leuven in November 1539, intending to continue his studies in Spain. He then changed his plans and in December 1539, he travelled via Paris to Angers. On 23 February 1540 in Paris, he completed his first historical work, the liber rerum Cimbriacarum, which is virtually a first (short) version of his Zimmern Chronicle.

Shortly after Easter 1540 Froben traveled to Angers, together with his younger brother Gottfried, whom he had met in Paris. In the winter of 1540/41 but they continued their studies in Tours, as the cost of living in Angers had become too high. Froben became very ill during that period. This may have been a case of smallpox, or the effect of one of his alchemical experiments.

After his recovery, he made a hasty return to Meßkirch, because he, because he feared for his life, due to a feud against his family. He reached Meßkirch at the end of July 1541. His fears proved unfounded, and he continued his studies in the fall in Speyer. In Speyer, he lived in the house of his uncle Wilhelm Werner, who was at that time assessor at the Reichskammergericht and would be promoted to a full judge in 1548. In July 1542, Wilhelm Werner temporarily suspended his work for the Reichskammergericht, and Froben Christoph finished his studies.

== Early years as a Swabian nobleman ==
It is remarkable that Froben had virtually no contact with his father during the first 23 years of his life. He didn't see his father at all during the first twelve years. He met his father only four times in the next 11, for a total time of significantly less than twelve months. Their dislike was mutual.

It is therefore not surprising that Froben spent the years until he'd inherit the county in Meßkirch with his uncle Gottfried Werner, rather than at Falkenstein Castle with his father. Gottfried may have seen Froben as the son he didn't have himself, or at least as a guarantee for the continued existence of the von Zimmerns. In any case, he took care of Froben's education.

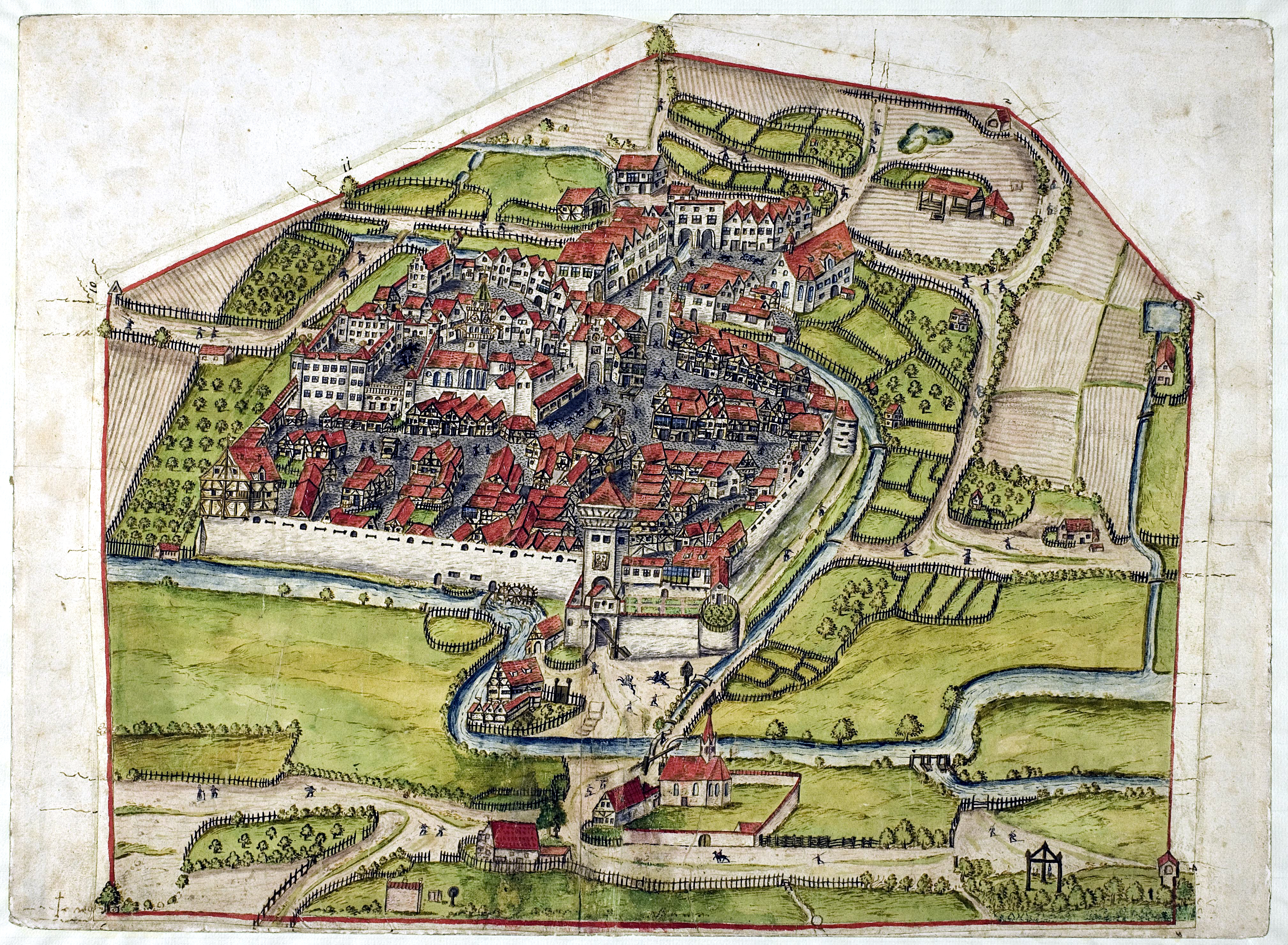
Bird's eye view of Meßkirch in 1575. At the top, the new suburb with Weisenburg Castle and the new hospital. The suburb was founded in 1550.

The next twelve years were hard, as Werner Gottfried kept his protégé very short. Nevertheless, the Zimmer Chronicles suggests a cordial relationship still existed between them. He fulfilled social obligations for his uncle, and after his father's death in January 1548, also for his own properties.

In 1544, Froben married Kunigunde, a daughter of Wilhelm IV of Eberstein. Three years later, in 1547, he took part in the Diet of Augsburg. After his father died in 1548, he took care to secure his inheritance. This included paying his father's mistress and securing his brother's renunciation of his rights to inherit. In June 1549, he traveled to Innsbruck, to receive confirmation of a fief in Austria. His only son, Wilhelm, was born on 17 June 1549. This proved to be a trigger to initiate construction projects, like his uncle Gottfried Werner had done. In 1550, he started construction of a new suburb of Meßkirch.

On 9 March 1554, his uncle suffered his first stroke. His uncle then handed the keys and title to all his worldly possessions to Froben, in the presence of witnesses.

== Ruling count ==
After Gottfried Werner died on 12 April 1554, Froben immediately ask his subjects to swear an oath of fealty to him. He also quickly invited his brothers to renew the renunciation of their right to inherit. When his brother-in-law Philipp of Eberstein married Countess Joanna of Donliers in St. Omer in 1556, Froben and his relatives used the occasion to organize a journey to Flanders via Zweibrücken, Trier, Liège, Tongeren, Leuven and Brussels.

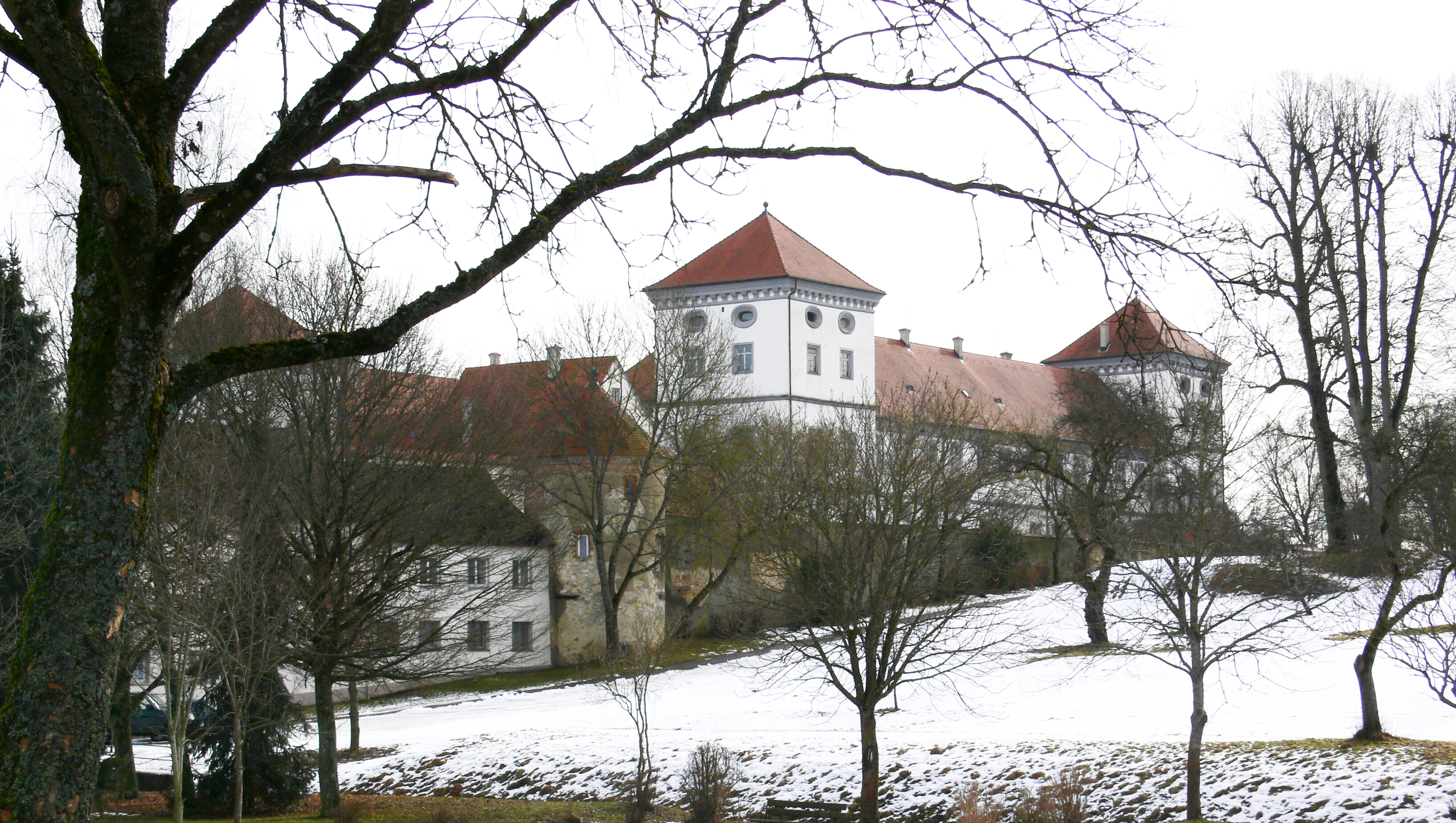
The castle in Meßkirch

On 9 May 1557, he laid the foundation stone for the reconstruction of the castle in Meßkirch. It would be the first four-winged, Italian style castle in southern Germany. In the spring of 1558, he added an orchard modeled after one at the court in Heidelberg. On 8 October 1558, his seventh child was born. This was the last entry in the Zimmern Chronicles (apart from the supplements). In 1559, he retired from all public duties. However, he did attend the Diet in Augsburg.

== Chronicler ==
Manuscript A of the Zimmern Chronicles most likely originated around this time. Manuscript B was drafted from c. 1565.

In the winter of 1565/1566, he probably made a journey to Italy, which had been a long cherished dream from his youth. He had wanted to study in Bologna, but his father had not allowed this. Notes from the Chronicle mention visits to Venice and Rome.

He died on 27 November 1566, probably in Meßkirch.

== Marriage and issue ==
In 1544, Froben married Kunigunde von Eberstein. They had the following children:

- Anna (b. 1544), married Joachim of Fürstenberg
- Apollonia (1547–1604), married Georg of Helfenstein
- Joanna (1548–1613), married Jakob Truchsess of Waldburg-Zeil
- Wilhelm (1549–1594), married Sabine of Thun
- Kunigunde, married:
  1. Johann Truchsess of Waldburg-See-Waldsee
  2. Berthold of Königsegg
- Eleonora (b. 1554), married:
  1. Lazrus von Schwendi
  2. Johann IV of Limpurg-Schmiedelfeld
- Maria (b. 1555), married:
  1. Georg of Thurn
  2. Caspar of Lanthern
- Sybille (b. 1558), married Eitel Friedrich IV, Count of Hohenzollern
- Ursula (b. 1564), married Bernhard of Ortenburg
