= Zimmern Chronicle =

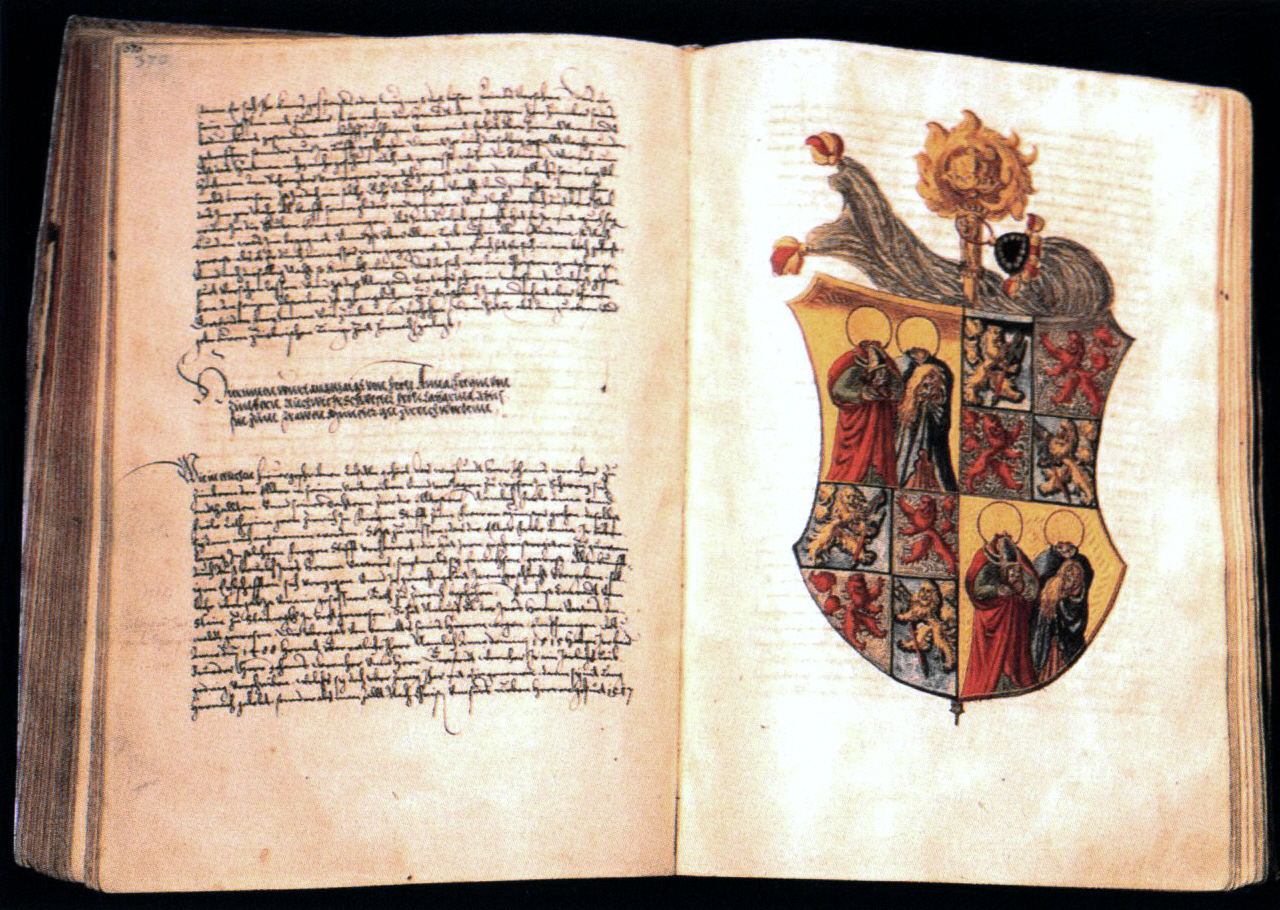
The Zimmern Chronicle, manuscript B

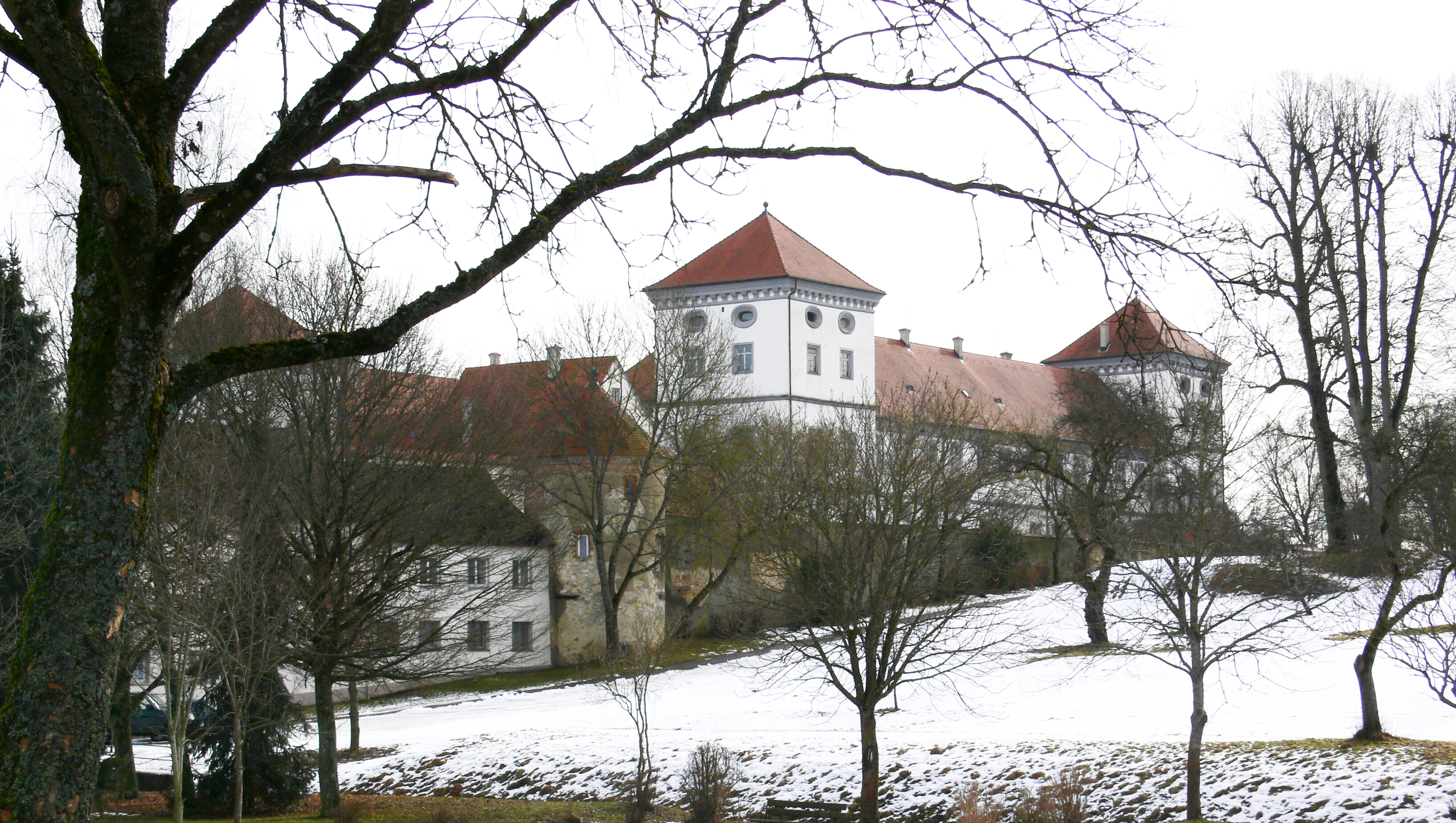
The Renaissance castle of Meßkirch where the work was written

The Zimmern Chronicle (German: Zimmerische Chronik or Chronik der Grafen von Zimmern) is a family chronicle describing the lineage and history of the noble family of Zimmern, based in Meßkirch, Germany. It was written in a Swabian variety of Early New High German by Count Froben Christoph of Zimmern (1519–1566). The chronicle is an eminent historical source of information about 16th century nobility in South-West Germany, its culture and its values. It is also an important literary and ethnological source for its many folkloristic texts. The text has survived in two manuscripts, both in possession of the Württembergische Landesbibliothek in Stuttgart.

== Authorship ==
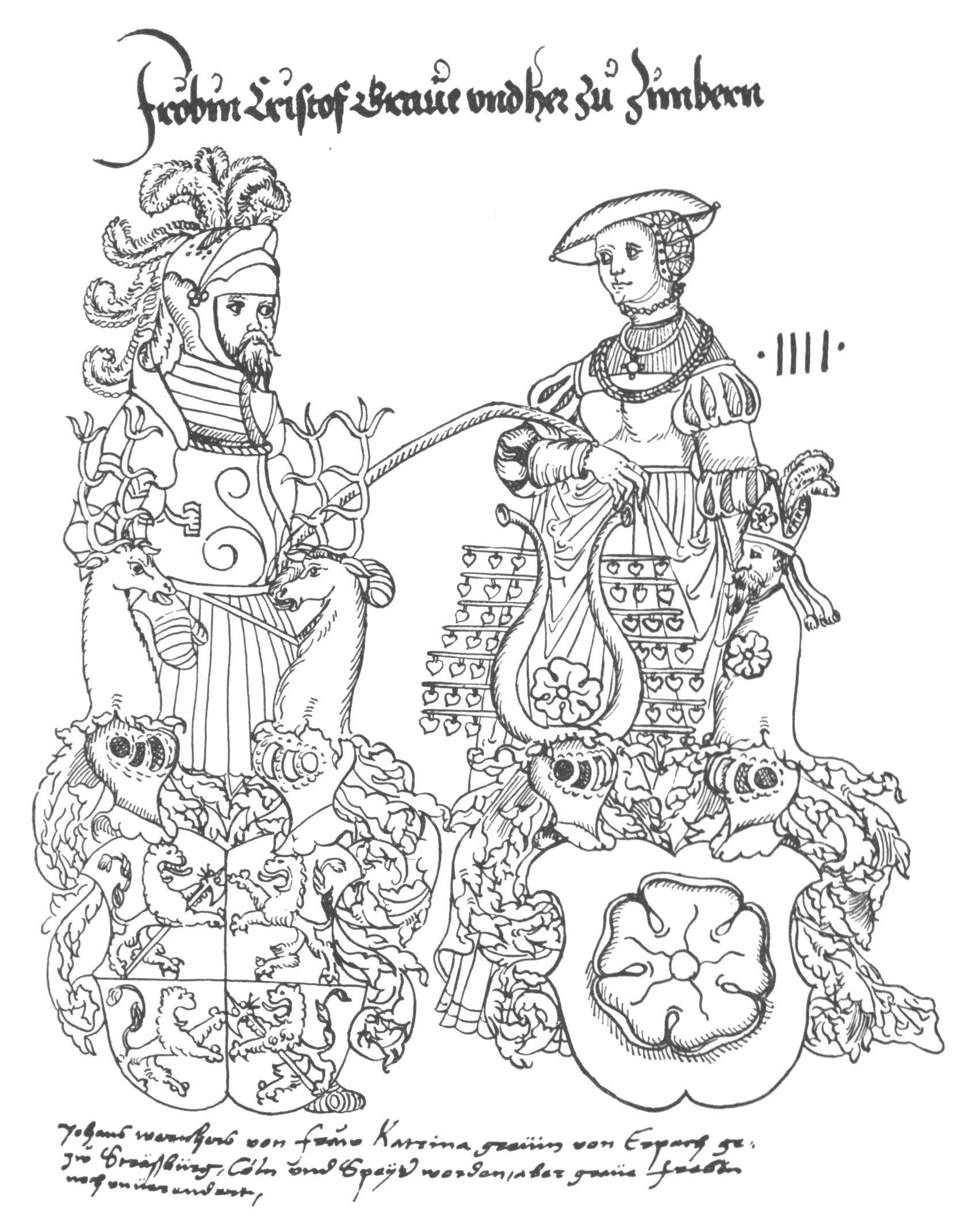
Froben Christopher of Zimmern and his wife (portrait from a manuscript of Froben's uncle Wilhelm Werner, not containing the Zimmern chronicle)

When the anonymous, unpublished chronicle was rediscovered in the 19th century, historians were not sure about the identity of the author (most of the chronicle is written in the third person, while at some times the writer slips into the first person). While some considered the author to be the famous law scholar and Imperial judge, Wilhelm Werner von Zimmern (Froben Christopher's uncle), others believed count Froben Christopher and his secretary Johannes Müller († c. 1600) to be the writers. In 1959, Beat Rudolf Jenny proved in his thoroughly researched book that Froben Christopher is the sole author of the chronicle. However, Wilhelm Werner's influence on his nephew is palpable in some passages.

== Purpose and ambition ==
Writing or ordering a genealogy was a rather common form of representation for Germany's noble families of the time. However, the Zimmern chronicle surpasses other contemporary texts in both volume and scope. It is a compilation of many types of texts, including simple genealogical information, psychologically rich biographies of ancestors and members of other noble families, fables, schwanks (droll stories) and facetiae (comic and/or erotic short stories).

The purpose of the work is probably twofold: Firstly, Froben Christopher wanted to prove the nobility of his family and to preserve that knowledge to posterity. Secondly, the chronicle was a means to educate future family members. The author does not only tell the stories of shining examples of nobility, but he also gives proof of bad examples. He clearly condemns some of his more spendthrift ancestors for selling family goods and hence giving away economic and political power.

== Contents ==
The Zimmern Chronicle begins with the history of the Cimbri, an ancient Germanic tribe, and tells the story of the Cimbri's forced relocation to the Black Forest under the reign of Charlemagne. While the link between the Cimbri and the Zimmern family is fictional and only induced by the similar-sounding name, Froben recounts several episodes woven into a stream of historical information to prove it. The work also includes a complete fictional genealogy starting in the 10th century. Historical evidence is entered with the first actually known family member, Konrad von Zimmern, abbot of Reichenau Abbey from c. 1234 to 1255. Starting with the early 14th century, the genealogical and historical parts of the Zimmern Chronicle are finally reduced to facts. Still, Froben inserts entertaining stories to enliven his characterizations and to prove his political points.

== History ==
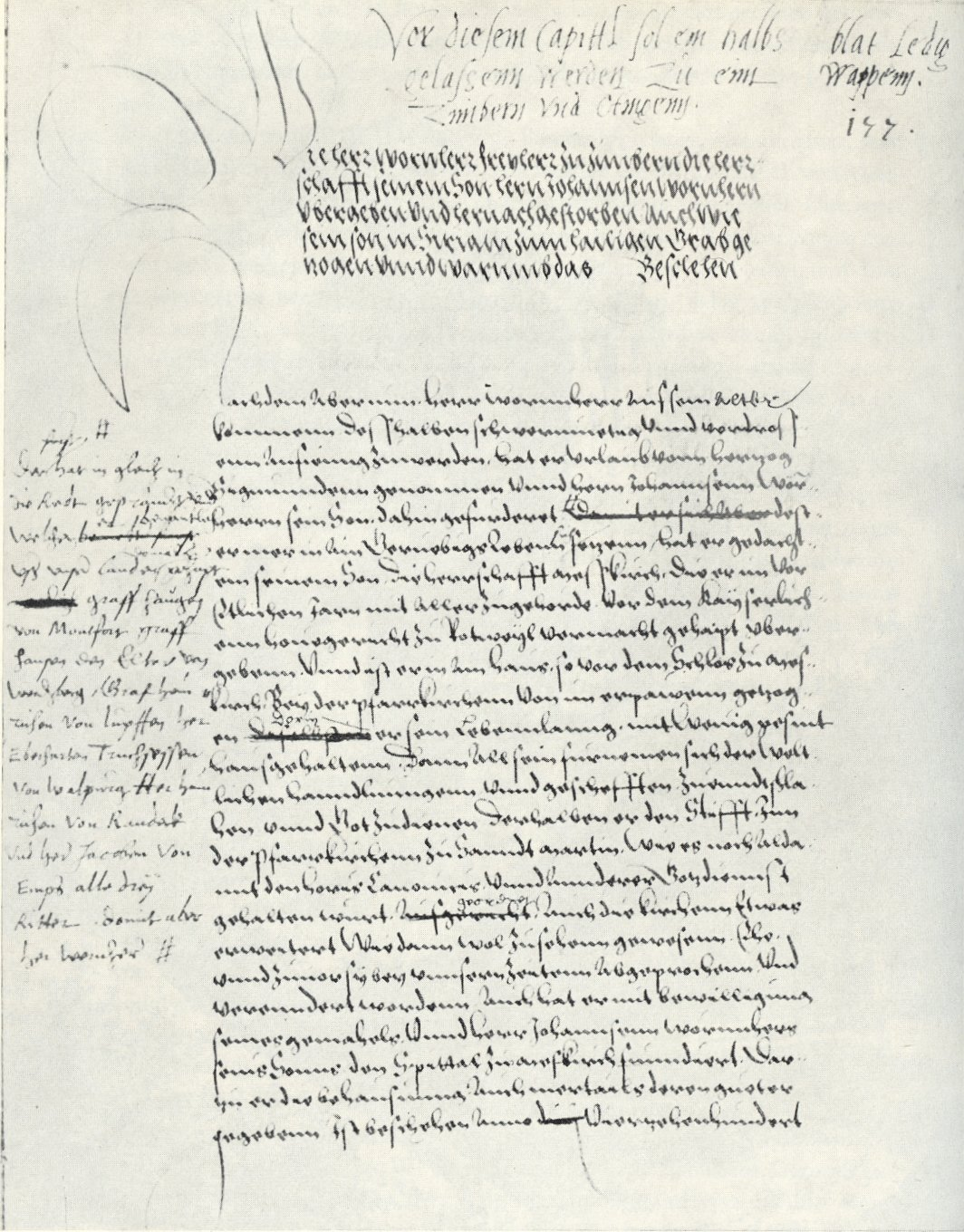
A page from manuscript A showing Froben Christopher's corrections

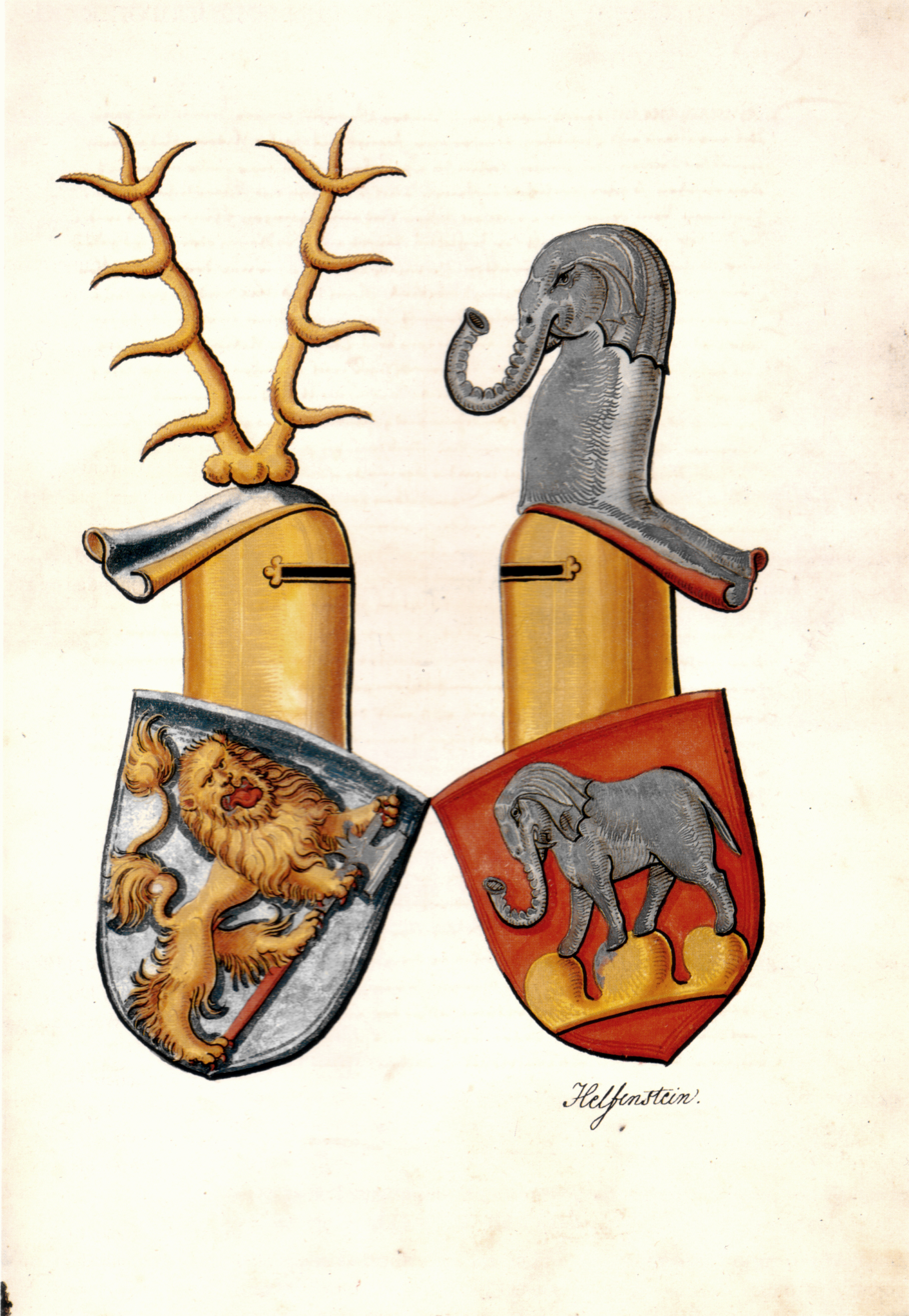
Illustration from manuscript B

In 1540, Froben Christopher had written the genealogical "Liber rerum Cimbriacarum" whose structure shows many resemblances to the later work.

The beginnings of the chronicle as we know it today lie probably in the year 1559, and it was not even finished at Froben Christopher's death in 1566.

Two manuscripts were written by secretary Johannes Müller at Froben Christopher's chancellery at Meßkirch Castle:

- Manuscript A (Cod. Don. 581): 296 sheets, probably started by Müller as a fair copy. Many later corrections by Froben Christopher, some sheets and illustrations removed. Probably eventually used as a draft copy for manuscript B.
- Manuscript B (Cod. Don. 580): 1567 pages (divided in two volumes since 1792, hence also known as B1/B2), illustrated with 43 images of coats of arms, a picture of a flag bearer and three ornamental pages.

With the Zimmern family expiring with the death of Froben Christopher's only male heir Wilhelm von Zimmern as early as 1594, the work never materialized as the memorial and textbook that it was originally intended to become. The chronicle manuscripts eventually wound up in the possession of the counts of Fürstenberg, probably via Appolonia von Helfenstein, a daughter of Froben Christopher's. The books were stored for nearly four centuries in the Fürstenbergische Hofbibliothek at Donaueschingen, until that library was sold and scattered by the princes of Fürstenberg for financial reasons in 1993. Since 1993, the manuscripts are in possession of the Wurttemberg State Library (Württembergische Landesbibliothek) in Stuttgart.

== Reception and editions ==
An archivist named Doeppner rediscovered the chronicle around 1776, but it was the literary scholar and author Joseph von Laßberg who made the text known among scholars and historians by using parts of it in his anthology "Liedersaal". Laßberg's friend Josef Albrecht von Ittner used plots from the chronicle for his own novellas. Laßberg also influenced Friedrich von der Hagen who used parts of the chronicle for his edition of German medieval literature, Minnesinger (1838), and Josef Eiselein who used the chronicle as a source for his collection of German proverbs (1840). Several monographs on regional history in these years used the chronicle as a source: Ernst Münch's history of the house of Fürstenberg (1829), Krieg von Hochfelden's history of the counts of Eberstein (1836), Ruckgaber's history of the counts of Zimmern (1840), and Vanotti's history of the counts of Montfort and Werdenberg (1845). Ludwig Uhland took some plots from the chronicle for his collection of folk tales.

In 1869, Karl August Barack published the first printed edition of the chronicle and hence made it finally available to the public. A revised version of this edition was published in 1882, a further reprint in 1932. Barack's revised edition is the only complete edition and is still widely used. However, Barack did not retain the original sequence of the manuscript and wove Froben Christopher's addenda into the main text, thus giving the lively tale an air of verbosity. This deluded later scholars in both questioning the author's literary abilities and scorning the factual content of the work which now much more resembled a collection of short droll stories than a serious work of genealogy and history.

A new edition was started in the 1960s by Hansmartin Decker-Hauff and Rudolf Seigel, retaining the original sequence of texts in manuscript B. This edition has remained unfinished. Only three volumes have appeared.

Manuscript 580 is available as a digitized version at the website of the Stuttgart library. The revised Barack edition is available as a digitized version at the website of the University Library of Freiburg. Since 2006, an electronic text of that edition is available at Wikimedia's German Wikisource project (see External links).

Modern German renarrations of some parts of the chronicle have been published in 1911, 1940, 1988, 1996 and 1997.

== List of editions ==
- Zimmerische Chronik, edited by Karl August Barack. Stuttgart 1869 (4 vols.)
- Zimmerische Chronik, edited by Karl August Barack. 2nd edition. Mohr, Freiburg 1881-1882 (4 vols.)
- Zimmersche Chronik, edited by Paul Hermann after Barack's edition. Hendel, Meersburg and Leipzig 1932 (4 vols.) – actually a reprint of Barack's 2nd edition
- Die Chronik der Grafen von Zimmern. Handschriften 580 und 581 der Fürstlich Fürstenbergischen Hofbibliothek Donaueschingen, edited by Hansmartin Decker-Hauff with Rudolf Seigel. Thorbecke, Konstanz 1964-1972 (3 vols.), unfinished
