= Alt Eberstein =

Alt-Eberstein
- Baden-Baden-Ebersteinburg, Germany
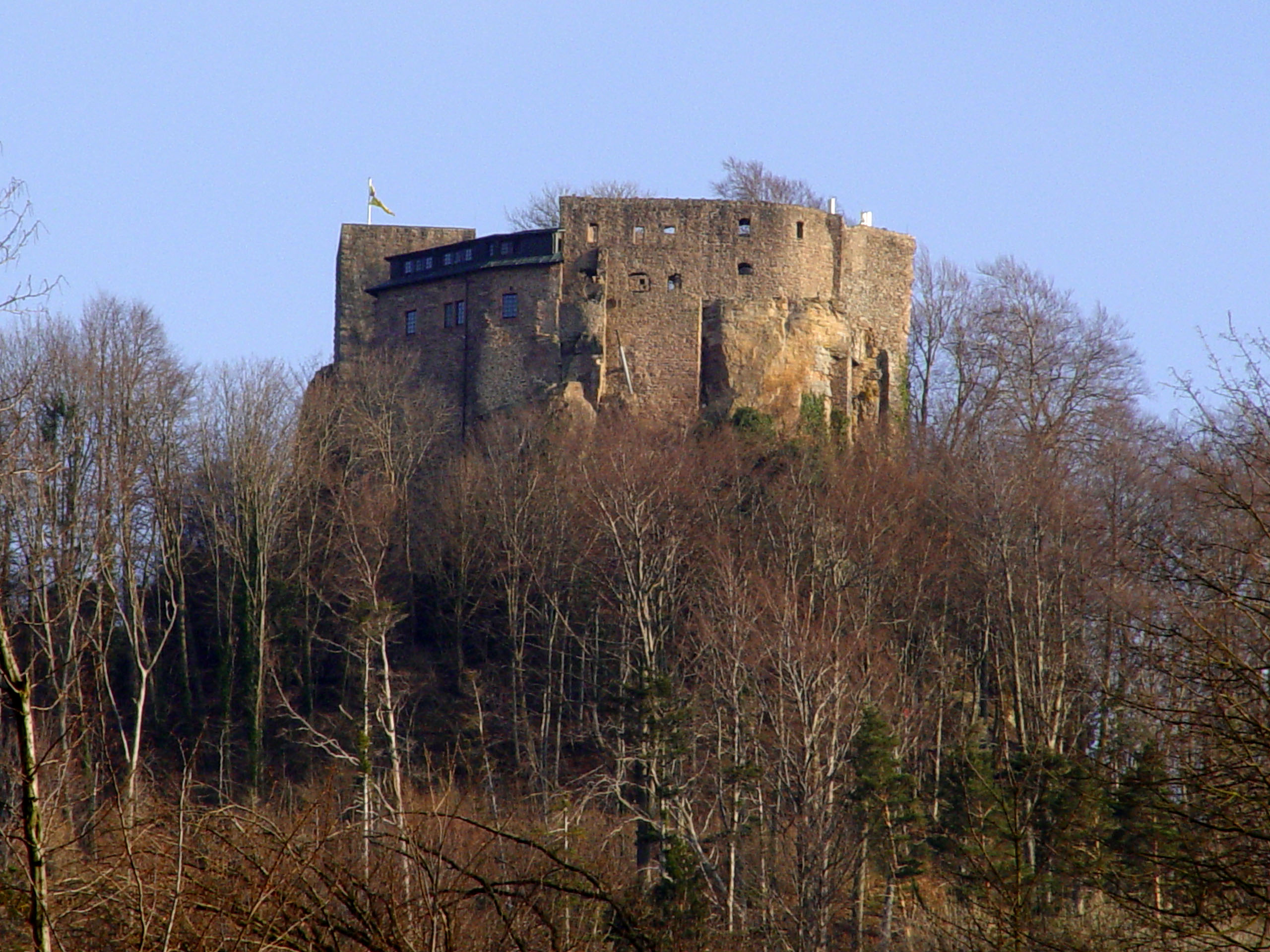
- The ruins of Alt-Eberstein - view of the north side

Site information
- Type: Hilltop castle in spur position
- Open to the public: Limited
- Condition: Ruin

Location
- Shown within Germany
- Coordinates: 48°47′02″N 8°16′14″E
- Height: 480 m (1,570 ft)

The ruins of Alt-Eberstein are the remains of the former Schloss Eberstein (Eberstein Castle), located on a hill near the town of Ebersteinburg and directly upstream of the modern city of Baden-Baden, in the state of Baden-Württemberg, Germany. The original structure was built in 1100 as the primary residence of the Counts of Eberstein, but by the end of the 16th century had been abandoned and much of the castle was torn down to provide materials for other structures. Presently it is a German national monument and a State Palace of Baden-Wuerttemberg.

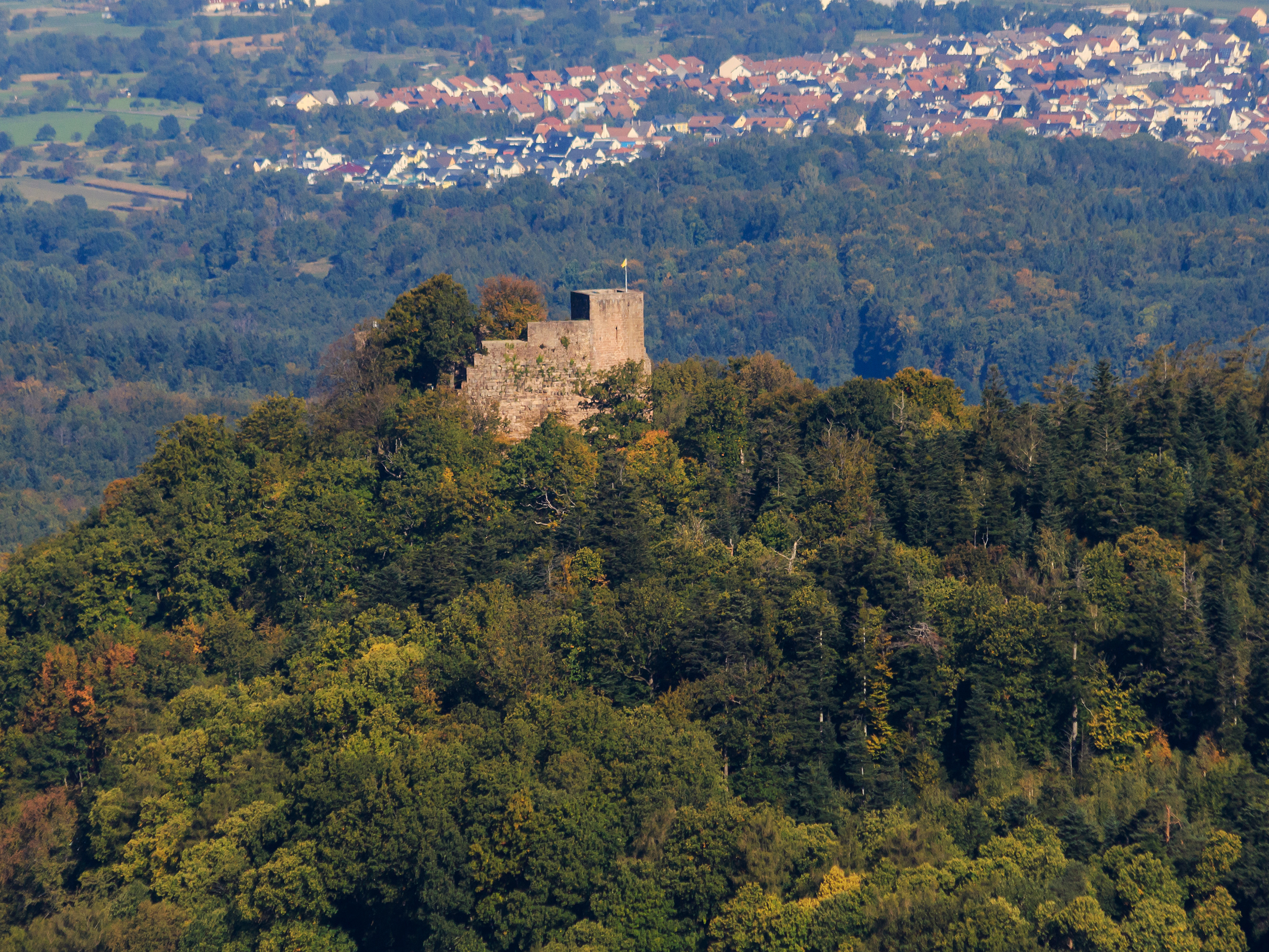
Aerial view of the ruins with Ebersteinburg in background

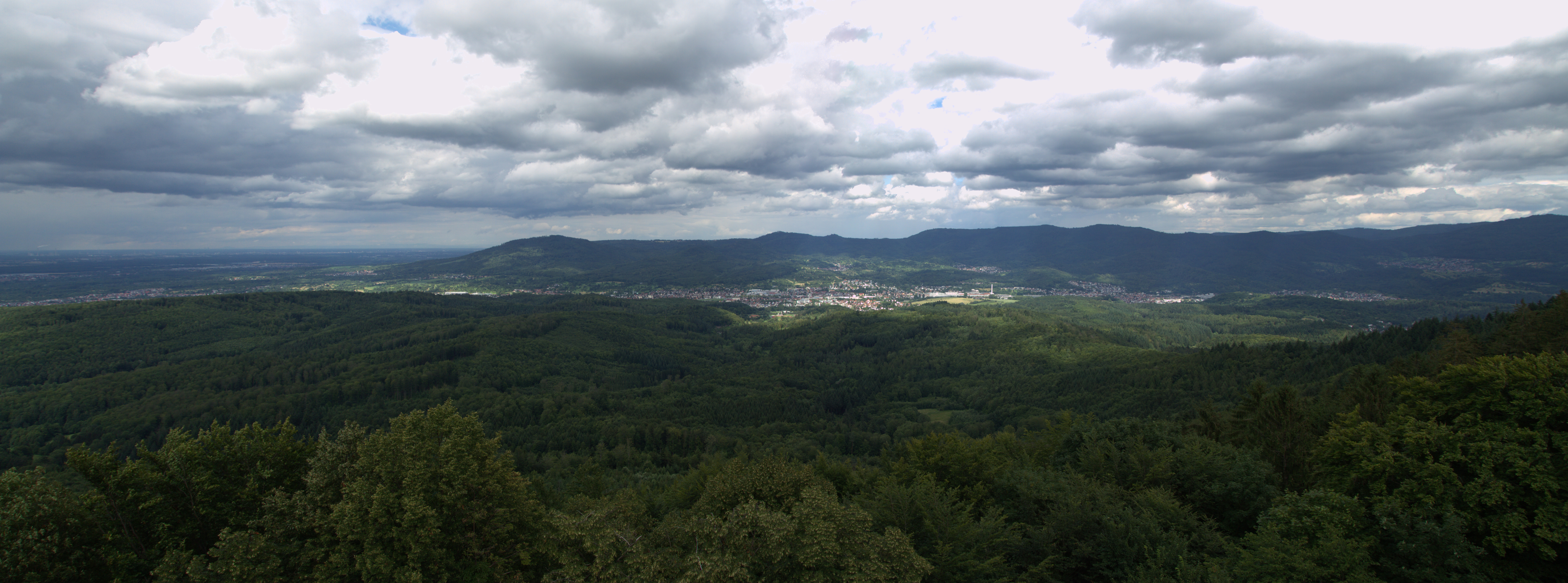
A view of the Murgtal from Alt-Ebersteinburg

== History ==
A spur castle situated on a once-strategic mountain peak, the fortress was constructed as the seat of the Counts of Eberstein perhaps as early as 1100. The oldest part of the castle remaining intact are the ramparts. The first historical mention of the castle occurs in 1197 as Castrum Eberstein. In the second half of the 13th century, the Ebersteins began construction on Castle Neu-Eberstein and the older seat declined in prominence and ultimately fell into disrepair; by 1573, it was uninhabited and thereafter became a quarry used by both the Eberstein descendants and locals. Starting in the 1800s, efforts have been made to preserve the site (which now consists solely of elements of the curtain wall and keep) and it presently one of the State Palaces and Gardens of Baden-Wuerttemberg, housing a restaurant and garden open to tourists.

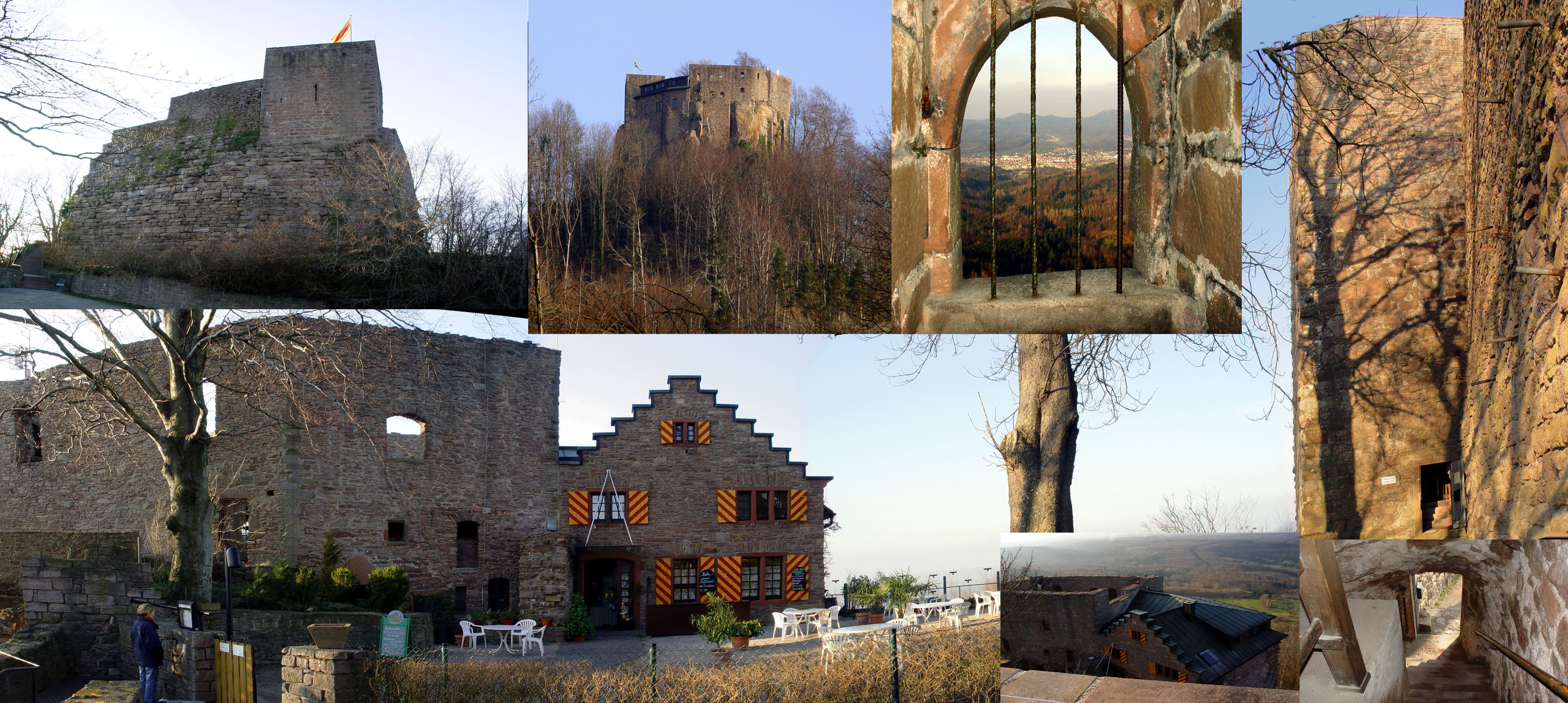
Various images of the ruins, including the remains of the curtain ramparts, bailey, and keep
