= Countess of Hanau =

== Countess of Hanau (1429–1458) ==
Picture	Name	Father	Birth	Marriage	Became Countess	Ceased to be Countess	Death	Spouse
	Katharina of Nassau-Beilstein	Henry II, Count of Nassau-Beilstein (House of Nassau)	—	18 January 1407	1429; Husband raised to Imperial Count	26 June 1451 husband's death	6 September 1459	Reinhard II
	Countess Palatine Margaret of Mosbach	Otto I, Count Palatine of Mosbach (House of Wittelsbach)	2 March 1432	11 July 1446	26 June 1451 husband's accession	20 April 1452 husband's death	14 September 1457	Reinhard III
In 1458, the county was divided in two parts, later named Hanau-Münzenberg and Hanau-Lichtenberg.

== Countess of Hanau-Münzenberg (1458–1736) ==
Picture	Name	Father	Birth	Marriage	Became Countess	Ceased to be Countess	Death	Spouse
	Adriana of Nassau-Siegen	John IV, Count of Nassau-Siegen (House of Nassau-Siegen)	7 February 1449	12 September 1468		15 January 1477		Philipp I
	Katharina of Schwarzburg-Blankenburg	Günther XXXVIII of Schwarzburg-Blankenburg (House of Schwarzburg)	after 1470	13 February 1496	26 August 1500 husband's accession	30 January 1512 husband's death	27 November 1514	Reinhard IV
	Juliana of Stolberg	Bodo III, Count of Stolberg-Wernigerode (House of Stolberg)	15 February 1506	27 January 1523		28 March 1529 husband's death	18 June 1580	Philipp II
	Countess Palatine Helena of Simmern	John II, Count Palatine of Simmern (House of Wittelsbach)	13 June 1532	22 November 1551		14 November 1561 husband's death	5 February 1579	Philipp III
	Magdalene of Waldeck-Wildungen	Philipp IV, Count of Waldeck (House of Waldeck)	1558	5 February 1576		4 February 1580 husband's death	9 September 1599	Philipp Ludwig I
	Countess Catharina Belgica of Nassau	William the Silent (House of Nassau)	31 July 1578	23 October 1596		9 August 1612 husband's death	12 April 1648	Philipp Ludwig II
	Sibylle Christine of Anhalt-Dessau	John George I, Prince of Anhalt-Dessau (House of Ascania)	11 July 1603	26 December 1627		3 August 1638 husband's death	21 February 1686	Philipp Moritz
	Sibylle Christine of Anhalt-Dessau	John George I, Prince of Anhalt-Dessau (House of Ascania)	11 July 1603	26 December 1627	13 May 1647	30 March 1685 husband's death	21 February 1686	Friedrich Casimir
	Countess Palatine Magdalena Claudia of Zweibrücken-Birkenfeld-Bischweiler	Christian II, Count Palatine of Zweibrücken-Birkenfeld (House of Wittelsbach)	16 September 1668	27 February 1689		28 November 1704		Philipp Reinhard
	Princess Charlotte Wilhelmine of Saxe-Coburg-Saalfeld	John Ernest IV, Duke of Saxe-Coburg-Saalfeld (House of Wettin)	14 June 1685	26 December 1705		4 October 1712 husband's death	5 April 1767	Philipp Reinhard
	Dorothea Friederike of Brandenburg-Ansbach	John Frederick, Margrave of Brandenburg-Ansbach (House of Hohenzollern)	12 August 1676	20 (or 30) August 1699		13 March 1731		Johann Reinhard III
In 1736, Hanau-Münzenberg fell to Hesse-Darmstadt.

== Countess of Hanau-Lichtenberg (1458–1736) ==
Picture	Name	Father	Birth	Marriage	Became Countess	Ceased to be Countess	Death	Spouse
	Anna of Lichtenberg	Ludwig V, Lord of Lichtenberg	25 October 1442	6 September 1458	1458	24 January 1474		Philipp I
	Anna of Isenburg-Büdingen	Louis II, Count of Isenburg-Büdingen (House of Isenburg)	1460	9 September 1480		22 August 1504 husband's death	27 July 1522	Philipp II
	Sibylle of Baden	Christoph I, Margrave of Baden-Baden (House of Zähringen)	26 April 1485	24 January 1505		10 July 1518		Philipp III
	Eleonore of Fürstenberg	Frederick II, Count of Fürstenberg (House of Fürstenberg)	11 October 1523	22 August 1538		23 June 1544		Philipp IV
	Agathe of Limpurg-Obersontheim	Friedrich VII, Lord of Limpurg-Obersontheim	17 November 1561	20 June 1586	19 February 1590 husband's accession	2 June 1599 husband's death	6 August 1623	Philipp V
	Countess Maria Elisabeth of Hohenlohe-Neuenstein	Wolfgang, Count of Hohenlohe-Weikersheim (House of Hohenlohe)	12 June 1576	22 October 1593	2 June 1599 husband's accession	21 January 1605		Johann Reinhard I
	Countess Johanna of Oettingen-Oettingen	Ludwig Eberhard, Count of Oettingen-Oettingen	30 August 1602	15 November 1619	19 November 1625 husband's accession	17 September 1639		Philipp Wolfgang
	Wild- and Rhinegravine Dorothea Diana of Salm	John IX of Salm-Kyrburg-Mörchingen (House of Salm)	25 July 1604	18 May 1640		14 February 1641 husband's death	19 December 1672	Philipp Wolfgang
	Sibylle Christine of Anhalt-Dessau	John George I, Prince of Anhalt-Dessau (House of Ascania)	11 July 1603	13 May 1647		30 March 1685 husband's death	21 February 1686	Friedrich Casimir
	Dorothea Friederike of Brandenburg-Ansbach	John Frederick, Margrave of Brandenburg-Ansbach (House of Hohenzollern)	12 August 1676	20 or 30 August 1699		13 March 1731		Johann Reinhard III
In 1736, Hanau-Lichtenberg fell to Hesse-Darmstadt.
