= Albrecht of Hanau-Münzenberg =

Albert of Hanau-Münzenberg
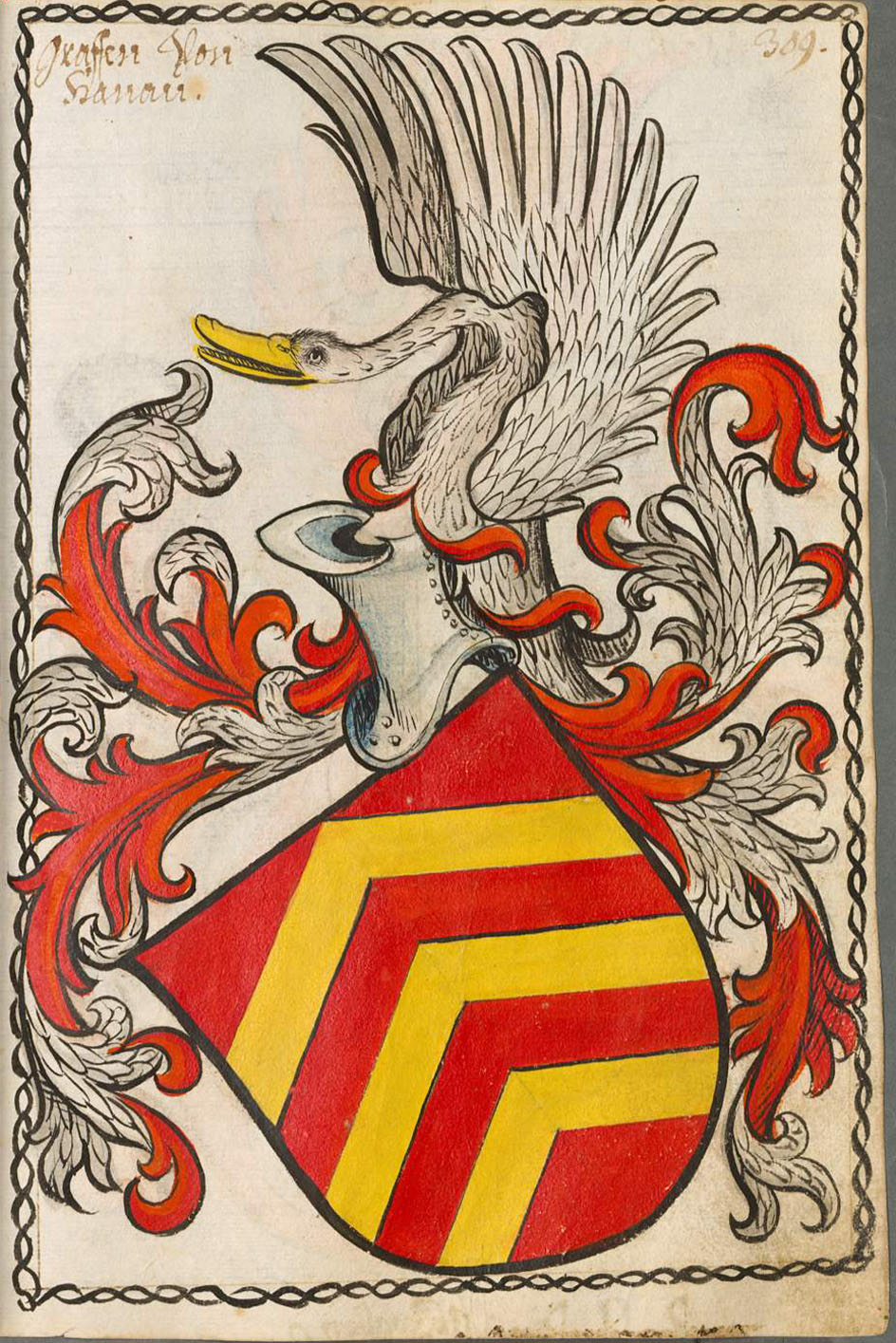
- Coat-of-arms of the count of Hanau
- Born: 12 November 1579
- Died: 19 December 1635 (aged 56); Strasbourg
- Noble family: House of Hanau
- Spouse: Ehrengard of Isenburg
- Father: Philip Louis I, Count of Hanau-Münzenberg
- Mother: Magdalene of Waldeck-Wildungen

Albert of Hanau-Münzenberg (12 November 1579 – 19 December 1635 in Strasbourg) was the younger son of Philip Louis I of Hanau-Münzenberg (1553-1580) and his wife, Countess Magdalene of Waldeck-Wildungen (1558-1599). The only sons of his parents to reach adulthood were Albert and his elder brother Philip Louis II. Albert's son John Ernest was the last male member of the Hanau-Münzenberg line of the House of Hanau.

== Regency ==
When his father died in 1580, Albert and his brother were still minors and a regency was necessary. The regents were Counts John VI, Count of Nassau-Dillenburg (1536–1606), Louis I, Count of Sayn-Wittgenstein (1568–1607) and Philip IV, Count of Hanau-Lichtenberg (1514–1590), who was replaced in 1585 by his son, Count Philip V of Hanau-Lichtenberg (1541–1599).

Albert's mother Magdalena remarried in 1581 to John VII, Count of Nassau-Siegen, the son of his guardian and regent. She and her sons from her first marriage then moved to the Nassau court in Dillenburg. At the time, this was a centre of Calvinism in Germany. The court in Dillenburg maintained cordial relations with the Reformed court of the Electorate of the Palatinate in Heidelberg.

However, Philip IV of Hanau-Lichtenberg, Albert's Lutheran guardian, and later his son Philip V, vehemently resisted this Calvinist influence, though ultimately their resistance was in vain. Philip V tried to have the Lutheran Duke Richard of Simmern-Sponheim, a younger brother of Elector Palatine Frederick III appointed as co-regent. He managed to obtain a mandate to this effect from the Reichskammergericht, however, the Calvinist prevented Richard's installation and prevented the people of Hanau-Münzenberg from paying tribute to Duke Richard. Instead, they installed Duke John Casimir of the Palatinate-Simmern as upper guardian, an honorary position, which nevertheless strengthened the Calvinist hold on Hanau-Münzenberg.

The end of the guardianship is difficult to determine. In 1600, the guardians had a dispute with Philip Louis II and ended their guardianship over him. However, Albert was still a minor in 1600 (at the time, the age of majority was 25), and the guardians continued their guardianship over him at least until he came of age in 1604. The guardians did not file their final account until urged to do so by Elector Palatine Frederick IV in 1608.

== Youth ==
In 1585, Albert enrolled at the Herborn Academy, where his brother also studied. In 1588, he enrolled in the Tertia Classis of the Pädagogicum, also in Herborn. In 1591, he enrolled at the university of Heidelberg, where he was elected rector on 20 December 1591.

== Reign ==
Albert spent most of his life in a violent dispute with his brother Philip Louis II, his cousin Philip Maurice (1605-1638), and his cousin's regent, his sister-in-law Catharina Belgica of Nassau. This dispute was fought partly in court, partly using military means. Albert demanded a partition of the county. Philip Louis II, however, followed a decree from 1375, which prescribed primogeniture in the House of Hanau. When Philip Louis II came of age, his guardians sided with Albert in this dispute, leading to violent clashes between Philip Louis II and his former guardians.

A compromise was reached, in which Albert received the districts of Schwarzenfels, Ortenberg, the territories of the former monastery in Naumburg and Hanau's share of Assenheim. Albert then moved into Schwarzenfels Castle. However, the compromise did not end the dispute. Albert now demanded sovereignty, while Philip Louis II had only granted him economic use of the apanage.

Albert and his family were forced to leave Schwarzenfels Castle during the Thirty Years' War, probably in 1633. He fled to Worms and later to Strasbourg, where he suffered serious financial problems.

== Death ==
Albert died on 19 December 1635, in exile in Strasbourg. The funeral sermon is preserved.

With Albert's death, the sovereignty dispute ended, his son and heir, John Ernest, did not claim sovereignty, at least not until he eventually inherited all of Hanau-Münzenberg.

== Marriage and issue ==
On 16 August 1604, Albert married Countess Ehrengard of Isenburg (1 October 1577 – 20 September 1637 in Frankfurt). Some sources say her given name was Irmgard. They had the following children:

- Albert (1606-1614), buried in the Schlüchtern Monastery. His grave was examined during archaeological excavations in 1938 and 1986 and he was then reburied.
- Maurice (b. 1606; died young)
- Catherine Elizabeth (* on or before 14 September 1607 – 14 September 1647), married to Count William Otto of Isenburg-Birstein (1597-1667)
- Johanna (1610 – 13 September 1673 in Delft), married:
  1. in September 1637 to Wild- and Rhinegrave Wolfgang Frederick von Salm (1589 – 24 December 1638). This marriage remained childless.
  2. on 14 December 1646 to Prince Manuel António of Portugal (1600-1666)
- Magdalena Elisabeth (28 March 1611 – 26 February 1687), married to George Frederick Schenk of Limpurg (1596-1651)
- John Ernest (13 June 1613 – 12 January 1642), betrothed to Princess Susanna Margarete of Anhalt-Dessau (25 August 1610 – 3 October 1663), the last reigning count of the Hanau-Münzenberg branch of the House of Hanau
- Christopher Louis (b. 1614; died shortly after baptism)
- Elisabeth (1615-1665)
- Marie Juliane (15 January 1617 – 28 October 1643), married to Count John Louis of Isenburg-Birstein (1622-1685)

== Ancestors ==
Ancestors of Albrecht of Hanau-Münzenberg

8. Philip II, Count of Hanau-Munzenberg (1501-1552)
4. Philip III, Count of Hanau-Munzenberg (1526-1561)
9. Juliana of Stolberg (1506-1580)
2. Philip Louis I, Count of Hanau-Munzenberg (1553-1580)
10. John II, Count Palatine of Simmern (1509-1557)
5. Countess Palatine Helena of Simmern (1533-1579)
11. Beatrice of Baden (1492-1535)
1. Albert of Hanau-Münzenberg
12. Henry IV, Count of Waldeck-Wildungen (1456-1513)
6. Philip IV, Count of Waldeck (1493-1574)
13. Anastasia of Runkel (1477-1503)
3. Magdalene of Waldeck-Wildungen (1558-1591)
14. Salentin VII of Lower Isenburg (1492-1534)
7. Jutta of Isenburg (d. 1564)
15. Elisabeth of Hunolstein (d, 1538)
