= Philipp Ludwig III of Hanau-Münzenberg =

Philipp Ludwig III, Count of Hanau-Münzenberg
- Born: 26 November 1632; Hanau
- Died: 12 November 1641 (aged 8); The Hague
- Buried: Church of St. Mary in Hanau
- Noble family: House of Hanau
- Father: Philipp Moritz, Count of Hanau-Münzenberg
- Mother: Sibylle Christine of Anhalt-Dessau

Count Philipp Ludwig III of Hanau-Münzenberg (26 November [O.S. 16 November] 1632 in Hanau – 12 November 1641 in The Hague) was the last count of the main Hanau-Münzenberg line of the House of Hanau. After his death, the Hanau-Münzenberg-Schwarzenfels line inherited Hanau-Münzenberg.

== Youth ==
Philipp Ludwig was the eldest son of Count Philipp Moritz of Hanau-Münzenberg and Princess Sibylle Christine of Anhalt-Dessau. He was born in Hanau on 26 November [O.S. 16 November] 1632, and baptized there on 13 January [O.S. 3 January] 1633.

In 1634, the political situation in the Thirty Years' War forced Philipp Moritz to flee with his family. He fled via Metz, Châlons, Rouen and Amsterdam to his Orange-Nassau relatives in Delft and The Hague. Philipp Moritz returned to Hanau-Münzenberg in 1637, however, he left his son with his mother, Countess Catharina Belgica of Nassau.

Philipp Moritz died in 1638, only 33 years old. Thus Philipp Ludwig III inherited Hanau-Münzenberg at the age of 5. The Reichskammergericht appointed his mother as his sole guardian. Unlike earlier rulers of Hanau-Münzenberg, she maintained a relaxed relationship with the Hanau-Münzenberg-Schwarzenfels line of the family.

== Death ==
Philipp Ludwig III died of the measles at the age of 8, on 12 November 1641 in The Hague. He was the last member of the main Hanau-Münzenberg line. His siblings had all died before him. Hanau-Münzenberg was inherited by his first cousin once removed Count Johann Ernst of Hanau-Münzenberg-Schwarzenfels. When Johann Ernst died a year later, Hanau-Münzenberg fell to the Hanau-Lichtenberg line.

Philipp Ludwig III was buried on 18 February 1646 in the family crypt in the Church of St. Mary in Hanau, together with his mother and his successor. His pewter coffin was stolen in 1812, during the chaos of the Napoleonic Wars. He was reburied in a joint coffin, together with corpses from other coffins that had also been stolen.

== Ancestors ==
Ancestors of Philipp Ludwig III of Hanau-Münzenberg

8. Philipp Ludwig I, Count of Hanau-Münzenberg (1553–1580)
4. Philipp Ludwig II, Count of Hanau-Münzenberg (1576–1612)
9. Magdalene of Waldeck-Wildungen (1558–1599)
2. Philipp Moritz, Count of Hanau-Münzenberg (1605–1638)
10. William the Silent (1533–1584)
5. Countess Catharina Belgica of Nassau (1578–1648)
11. Charlotte of Bourbon (1546–1582)
1. Philipp Ludwig III, Count of Hanau-Münzenberg
12. Joachim Ernst, Prince of Anhalt (1536–1586)
6. Johann Georg I, Prince of Anhalt-Dessau (1567–1618)
13. Agnes of Barby-Mühlingen (1540–1569)
3. Sibylle Christine of Anhalt-Dessau (1603–1686)
14. Johann Casimir of the Palatinate-Simmern (1543–1592)
7. Countess Palatine Dorothea of Simmern (1581–1631)
15. Elisabeth of Saxony (1552–1590)

== Footnotes ==
Philipp Ludwig III of Hanau-Münzenberg House of Hanau Born: 26 November 1632 Died: 12 November 1641
Preceded by Philipp Moritz	Count of Hanau-Münzenberg; 1638–1641	Succeeded by Johann Ernst
