= Hanau-Lichtenberg =

Territory of the Holy Roman Empire

County of Hanau-Lichtenberg Grafschaft Hanau-Lichtenberg
- 1456/80 – 1736
- Coat of arms
- Status: State of the Holy Roman Empire
- Capital: Buchsweiler
- Government: County
- History
  - Established: 1456-1480
  - Disestablished: 1736
Preceded by
County of Hanau
Barony of Lichtenberg
County of Zweibrücken-Bitsch
Succeeded by
Landgraviate of Hesse-Darmstadt
Landgraviate of Hesse-Cassel
- Roman Catholic; from 16th-century Lutheran; ruled by counts; language: German

The County of Hanau-Lichtenberg was a territory in the Holy Roman Empire. It emerged between 1456 and 1480 from a part of the County of Hanau and one half of the Barony of Lichtenberg. Following the extinction of the counts of Hanau-Lichtenberg in 1736 it went to Hesse-Darmstadt, minor parts of it to the Hesse-Cassel. Its centre was in the lower Alsace, the capital first Babenhausen, later Buchsweiler.

== History ==
=== The Lichtenberg inheritance ===
In 1452, after a reign of only one year, Count Reinhard III of Hanau (1412–1452) died. The heir was his son, Philip the Younger (1449–1500), only four years old. For the sake of the continuity of the dynasty, his relatives and other important decision-makers in the county agreed not to turn to the 1375 primogenitur statute of the family—one of the oldest in Germany—and to let the heir's uncle and brother of the deceased, Philip I (the Elder) (1417–1480), have the administrative district of Babenhausen from the estate of the County of Hanau as a county in his own right. This arrangement of 1458 allowed him to have a befitting marriage and offspring entitled to inherit, and so increased the chances of survival of the comital house. Philip the Elder was called now "of Hanau-Babenhausen".

In the same year of 1458, Philip the Elder married Anna of Lichtenberg (1442–1474), one of the two daughter-heirs of Louis V of Lichtenberg (1417–1474). After the death of the last of the noble House of Lichtenberg (de), Louis' brother, James of Lichtenberg, in 1480, Philip I the Elder inherited the half of the Barony of Lichtenberg in the Lower Alsace with its capital, Buchsweiler. From this arose the branch and county of Hanau-Lichtenberg. His nephew, Philip I (the Younger) of Hanau and his descendants called themselves, by contrast, the "counts of Hanau-Münzenberg".

=== The Zweibrücken inheritance ===
The next large inheritance occurred in 1570. Count James of Zweibrücken-Bitsch (1510–1570) and his brother, Simon V Wecker, who had died in 1540, each left behind one daughter. The daughter of Count James, Margarethe (1540–1569), married Philip V of Hanau-Lichtenberg (1541–1599). The inheritance included the second half of the Barony of Lichtenberg, the County of Zweibrücken-Bitsch and the Barony of Ochsenstein. Parts of the County of Zweibrücken-Bitsch were a fief of the Duchy of Lorraine.

Initially a dispute broke out after James' death between the husbands of the two cousins, Count Philip I of Leiningen-Westerburg and Count Philip V of Hanau-Lichtenberg. Whilst Philip V of Hanau-Lichtenberg was able to overpower Philip I, his immediate introduction of Lutheranism in the course of the Reformation made himself an enemy of the powerful, Roman Catholic Duchy of Lorraine under Duke Charles III, who had the suzerainty of Bitsch and withdrew the fief. In July 1572 troops of Lorraine occupied the county and reversed the Reformation. Because Philip V could not match Lorraine's military might, he sought legal redress.

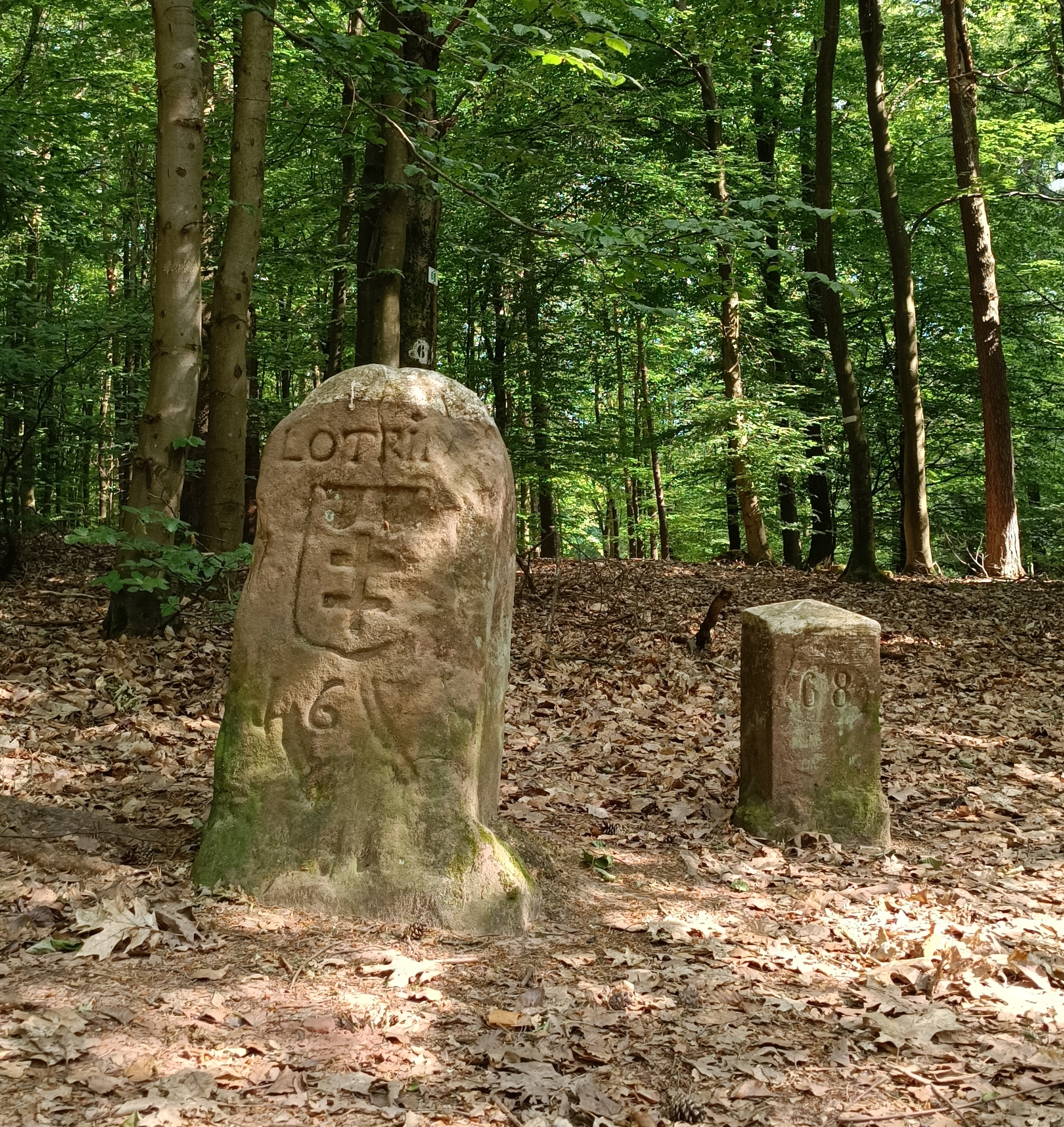
Boundary marker between the Duchy of Lorraine and Hanau-Lichtenberg, installed in 1608

Not until 1604 and 1606 the conflict was solved by a treaty between Hanau-Lichtenberg and Lorraine. It involved a division and took account of the old treaties: the Barony of Bitsch went back to Lorraine and the administrative district of Lemberg, which had been an allod of the counts of Zweibrücken, was allocated to Hanau-Lichtenberg. As a result, the Bitsche territory remained Roman Catholic, whilst the Lutheran confession was introduced into the district of Lemberg.

=== Reunification with Hanau-Münzenberg ===
In 1642 the last male member of the Hanau-Münzenberg family, Count Johann Ernst, died. The next male of kin was Friedrich Casimir, Count of Hanau-Lichtenberg, then still a minor under the guardianship of Georg II of Fleckenstein-Dagstuhl. The relation to count Johann Ernst was quite remote and the inheritance endangered in more than one way. The inheritance happened during the final years of Thirty Years' War, the feudal overlords of Hanau-Münzenberg were partly enemy to Hanau and tried to hold back fiefs traditionally held by Hanau-Münzenberg. Further the county of Hanau-Münzenberg was of Reformed Confession, Friedrich Casimir and the county of Hanau-Lichtenberg were Lutheran. And even to reach the capital of Hanau-Münzenberg, the town of Hanau, was a problem: Friedrich Casimir could do so only in disguise. The inheritance could finally be secured by a treaty of 1643 between Friedrich Casimir and Landgravine Amalie Elisabeth, née countess of Hanau-Münzenberg, daughter to Philipp II. She granted military and diplomatic support against the still resisted overlords. Therefore, Friedrich Casimir granted – should the house of Hanau be without male heirs – the inheritance of Hanau-Münzenberg to the descendants of Amalie Elisabeth. That actually happened in 1736.

For economical and political reasons Friedrich Casimir was married to Sibylle Christine of Anhalt-Dessau, the widow of Count Philipp Moritz, who had been the ruling count in Hanau-Münzenberg until 1638. She had received Steinau Castle as her widow seat. As widow of a ruling count, she could raise substantial claims against the county. The marriage was arranged to avoid such claims and to take advantage of the fact that she was Calvinist as the majority of the population in Hanau-Münzenberg, contrary to Friedrich Casimir who was a Lutheran. The disadvantage of this arrangement was that Sibylle Christine was already 44 years of age at the time, almost 20 years older than Friedrich Casimir. The marriage was plagued by differences and remained childless.

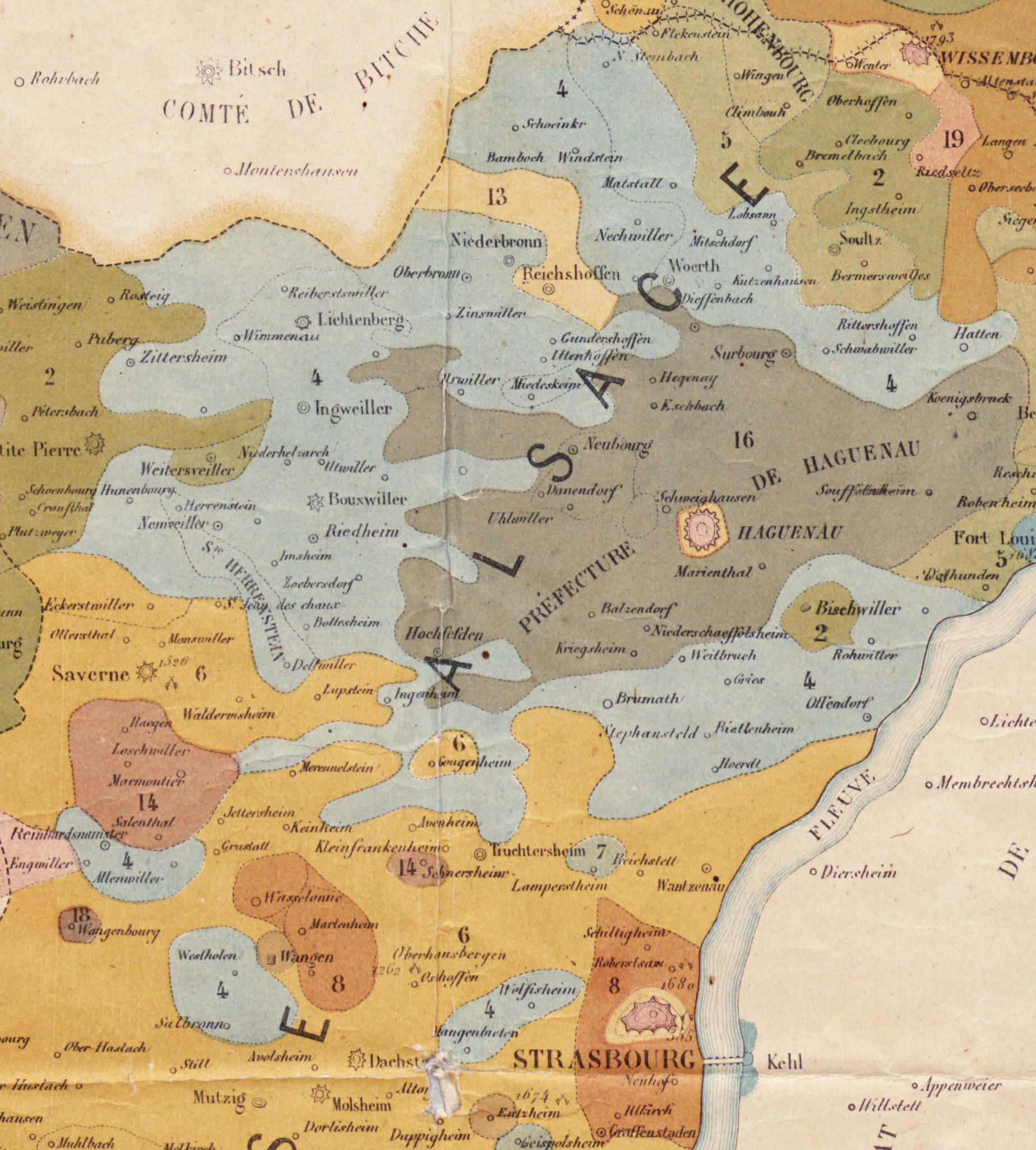
The portion of Hanau-Lichtenberg (in blue) within Alsace at the time it was annexed by France in 1680

In 1680 the county of Hanau-Lichtenberg came under the souvereignity of France, as a result of the politics of “reunion” by king Louis XIV of France.

Friedrich Casimir died childless in 1685. His inheritance was divided between his two male nephews, count Philipp Reinhard, who inherited Hanau-Münzenberg and count Johann Reinhard III, who inherited Hanau-Lichtenberg. Both were sons of Friedrich Casimir's younger brother count Johann Reinhard II. When in 1712 count Johann Reinhard II died count Johann Reinhard III inherited the county of Hanau-Münzenberg and for a last time both counties were united. With count Johann Reinhard III the last male member of the Hanau family died in 1736. Hanau-Münzenberg and Hanau-Lichtenberg fell to different heirs: Due to the treaty of succession of 1643 Hanau-Münzenberg was inherited by the Landgraviate of Hesse-Kassel, Hanau-Lichtenberg fell to the Landgraviate of Hesse-Darmstadt because Countess Charlotte of Hanau-Lichtenberg, daughter to Johann Reinhard III, was married to the heir of Hesse-Darmstadt, reigning later as landgrave Louis VIII.

Regarding the question if the administrative district of Babenhausen was part of Hanau-Münzenberg or Hanau-Lichtenberg nearly led into a war of both landgraviats in 1736 and into an extensive lawsuit at the Reichskammergericht during the next decades. The suit ended with a compromise to divide the administrative district of Babenhausen into two equal parts between the parties. But it took until 1771 to realize that.

In 1803 due to territorial reforms following the French Revolution the former county of Hanau-Lichtenberg was divided: All of it left of the Rhine became part of France, all of it right of the river fell to the Grand Duchy of Baden. A few bits left of the Rhine (Pirmasens) became part of the Kingdom of Bavaria in 1816.

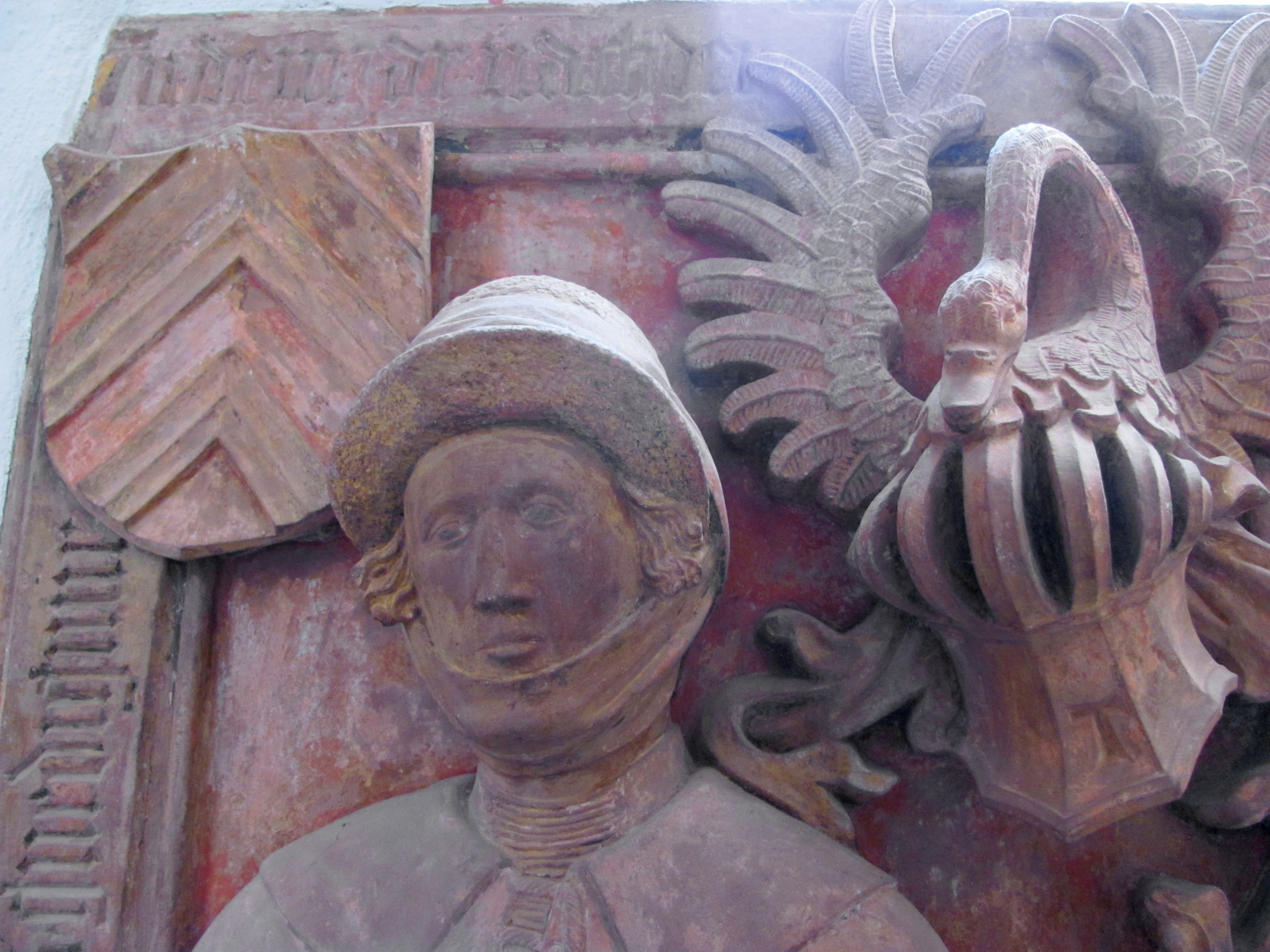
Philip I (the Elder), progenitor of the line of Hanau-Lichtenberg on his epitaph in the municipal church of St. Nicholas in Babenhausen

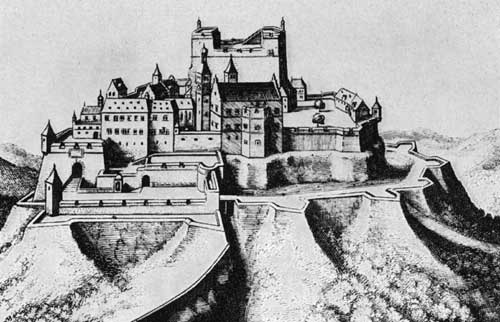
Lichtenberg Castle from a Merian copperplate

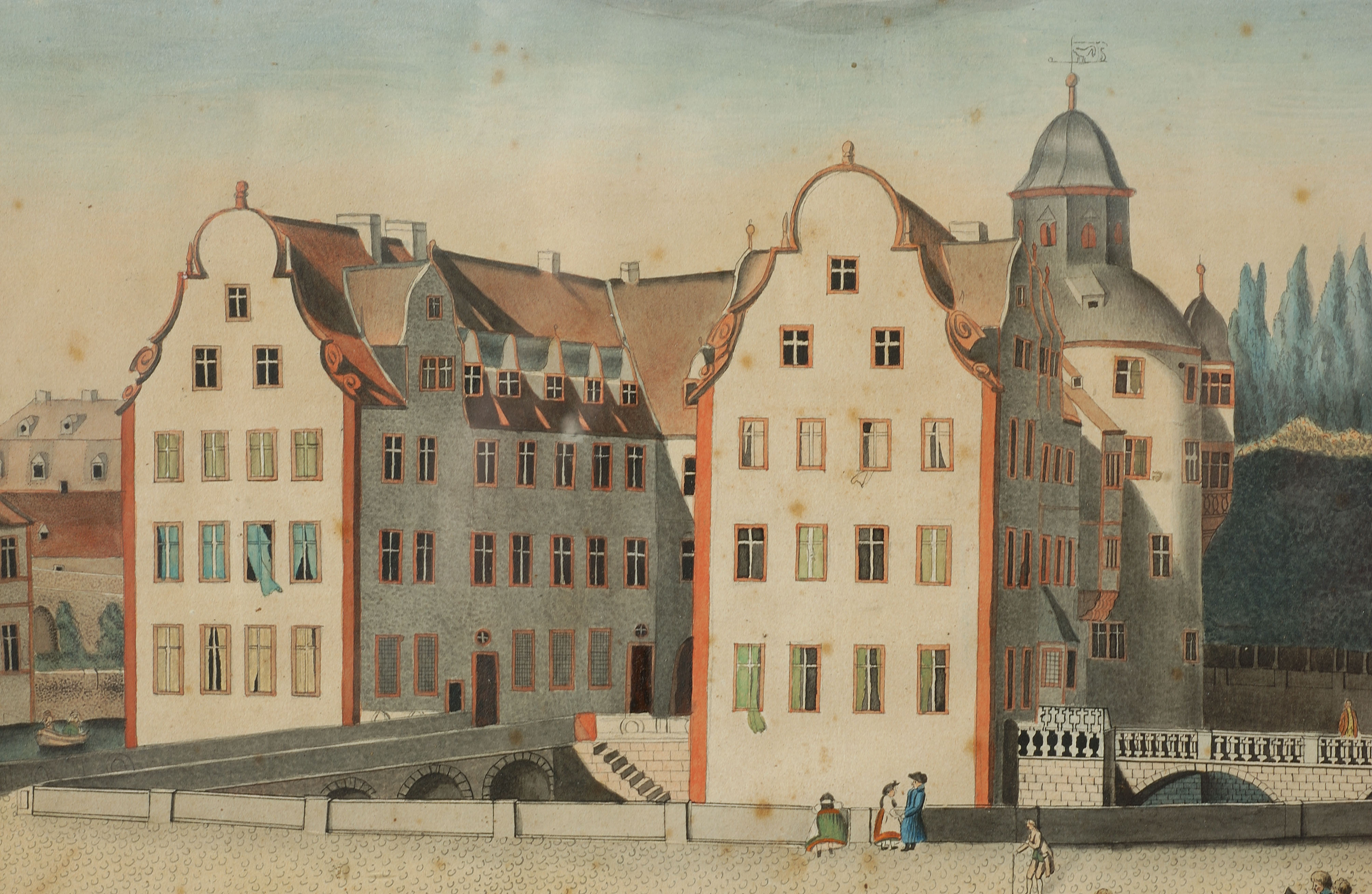
Buchsweiler Castle

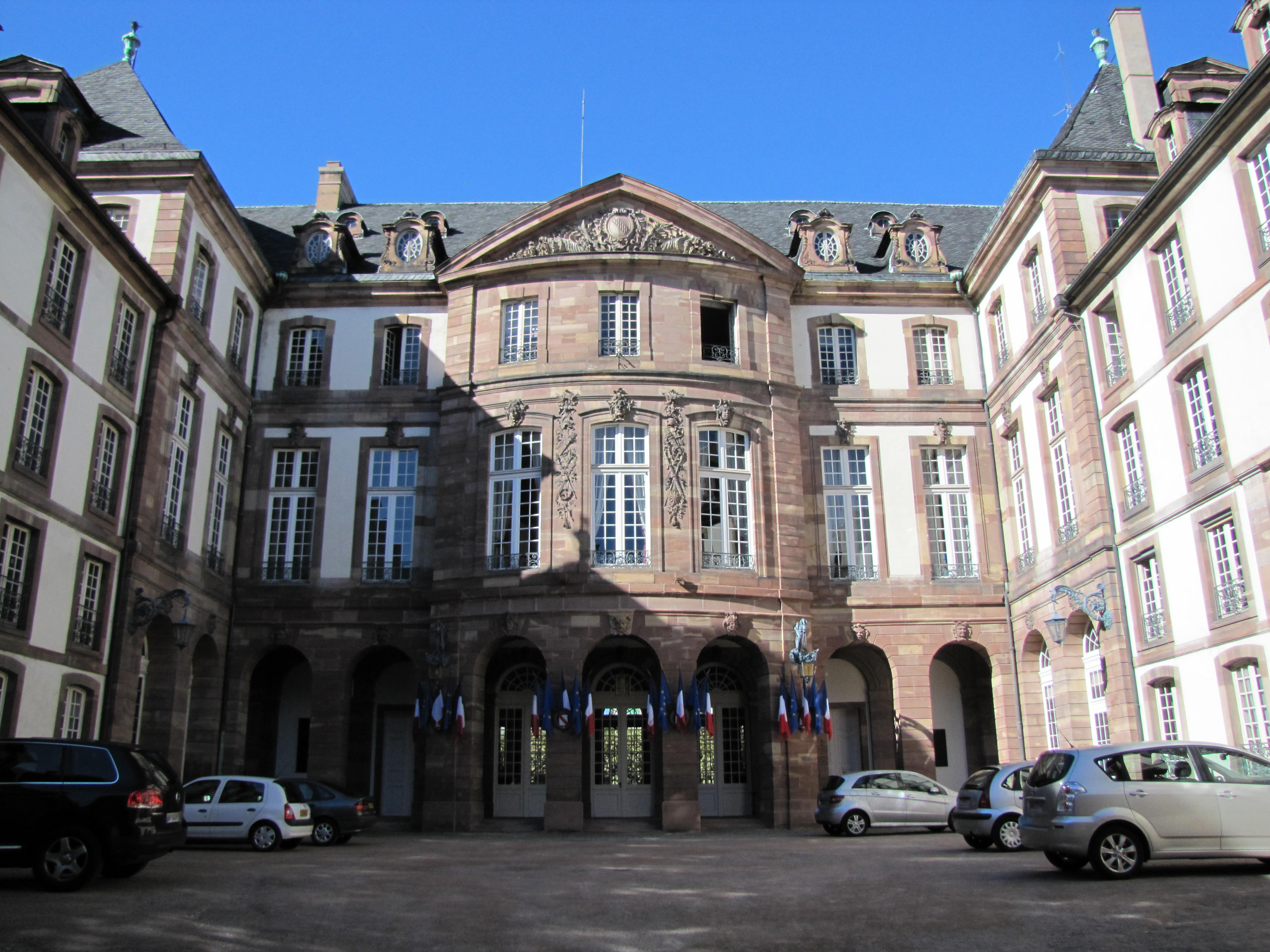
The Hanauer Hof, the city residence of the counts of Hanau-Lichtenberg in Strasbourg

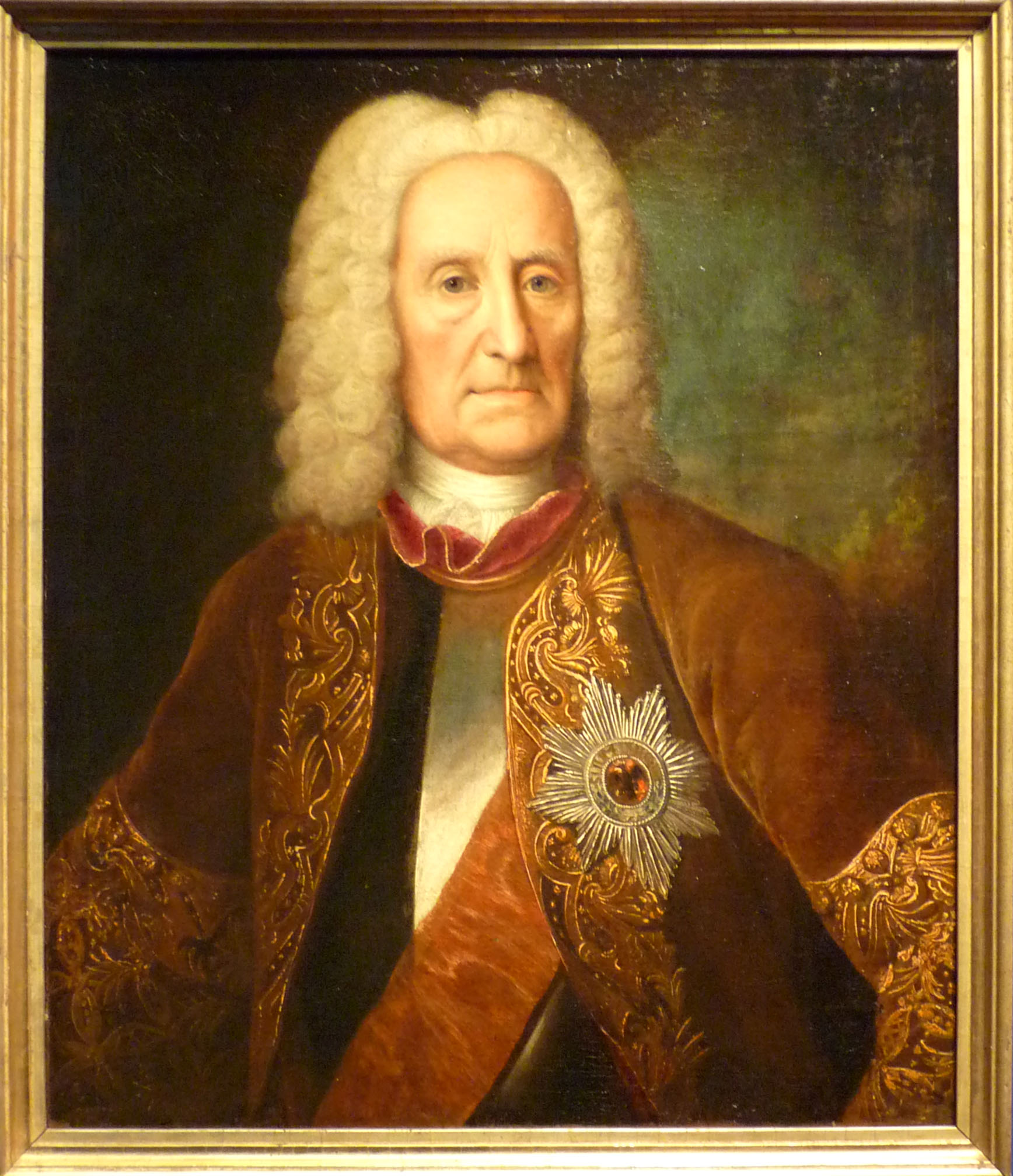
Johann Reinhard III. of Hanau-Lichtenberg, the last of the house of Hanau

== See also ==
- County of Hanau
- Hanau-Münzenberg
- List of rulers of Hanau
- Zweibrücken-Bitsch

== Literature ==
- Reinhard Dietrich: Die Landesverfassung in dem Hanauischen. Die Stellung der Herren und Grafen in Hanau-Münzenberg aufgrund der archivalischen Quellen. Selbstverlag des Hanauer Geschichtsvereins, Hanau, 1996, ISBN 3-9801933-6-5 (Hanauer Geschichtsblätter 34).
- Hans-Walter Herrmann: Die Grafschaft Zweibrücken-Bitsch. In: Hans-Walter Herrmann, Kurt Hoppstädter (ed.): Geschichtliche Landeskunde des Saarlandes. Band 2: Von der fränkischen Landnahme bis zur französischen Revolution. Historischer Verein für die Saargegend, Saarbrücken 1977, ISBN 3-921870-00-3, pp. 323–332 (Mitteilungen des Historischen Vereins für die Saargegend NF 4).
- Johann Georg Lehmann: Urkundliche Geschichte der Grafschaft Hanau-Lichtenberg. 2 Bände. Schneider, Mannheim, 1862 (Neudruck: Zeller, Osnabruck, 1974).
