= Georg II of Fleckenstein-Dagstuhl =

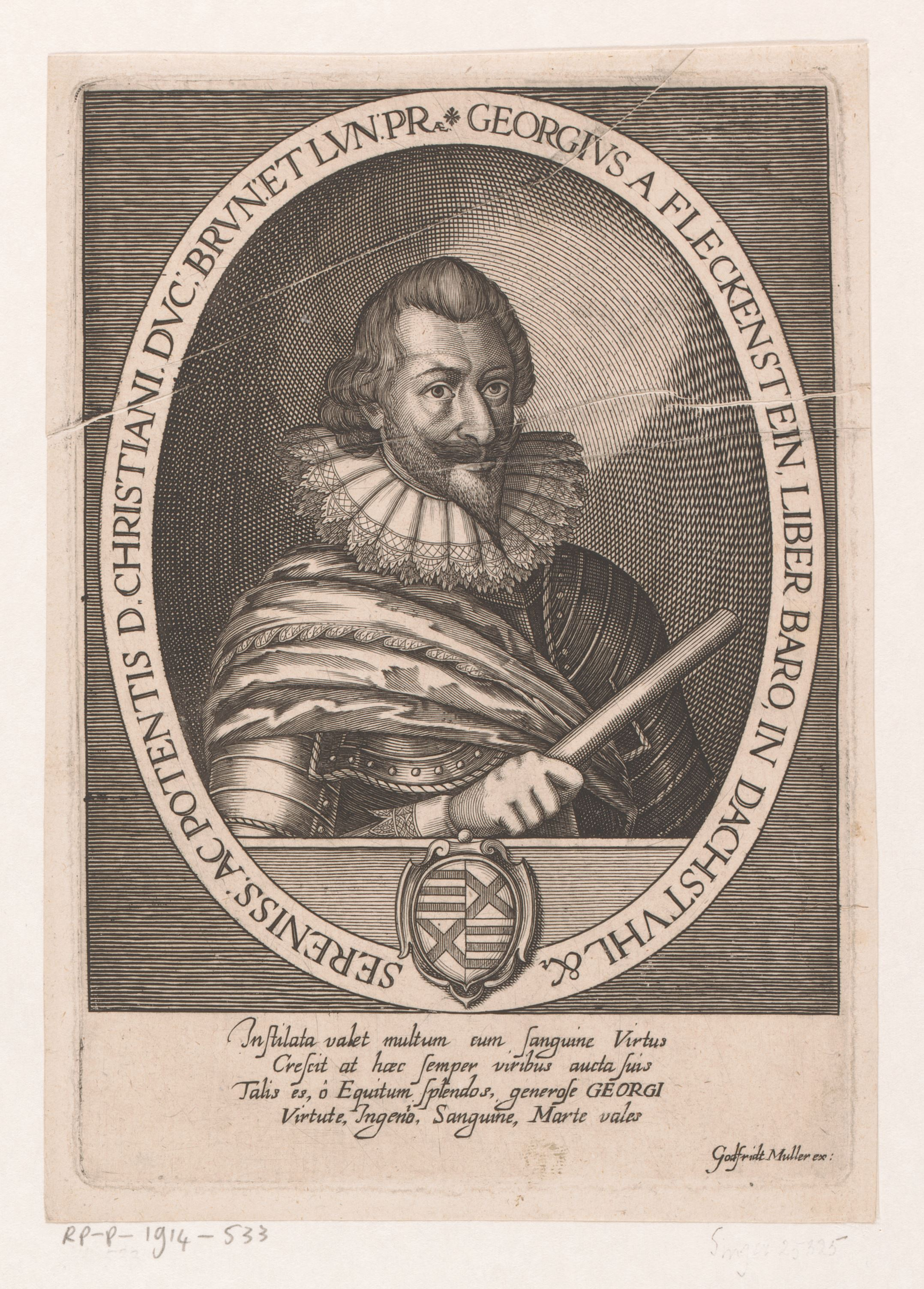
- Georg II of Fleckenstein-Dagstuhl
- Born: 2 February 1588
- Died: 31 January 1644 (aged 55); Hanau
- Buried: St. Mary's Church in Hanau.
- Noble family: House of Fleckenstein
- Father: Philipp Wolfgang of Fleckenstein-Dagstuhl
- Mother: Anna Alexandria of Rappoltstein

Georg II of Fleckenstein Dagstuhl (2 February 1588 – 31 January 1644) was the last baron of the house of Fleckenstein. He was the eldest son of Philipp Wolfgang of Fleckenstein-Dagstuhl (d. 1618) and his first wife, Anna Alexandria of Rappoltstein (7 March 1565 – 9 April 1610). Georg II gained considerable power as guardian and regent of the still underage Count Friedrich Casimir and the counties of Hanau-Lichtenberg and Hanau-Münzenberg during the final phases of the Thirty Years' War.

== Childhood ==
At twelve, he became a squire at the court in Nancy of Duke Charles III of Lorraine. Later, he was employed by Württemberg on a diplomatic mission to England. After that, he began a career in the military.

== Military career ==
He served in Hungary during the Long War. He climbed to the rank of colonel in the army of the Protestant Union. After the Union was dissolved in 1621, he entered the service of Margrave Friedrich V of Baden-Durlach. During a feud between the Hanseatic League and the Duke of Brunswick-Lüneburg, he killed a member of the House of Isenburg with a pistol shot. He retired in 1622 — turning down offers to become a general in the Danish, English or Swedish army — and focussed on the administration of his own barony.

== Reign ==
The Lordship of Fleckenstein came to feel the full force of the Thirty Years' War in 1622, when commander Ernst von Mansfeld spent the winter in the Upper Rhine area. Georg tried to follow the example of Counts Johann Reinhard I and his cousin Philipp Wolfgang of Hanau-Lichtenberg (1595–1641) and remain neutral. However, when the imperial side grew stronger, he found it impossible to maintain this policy. He sold the Dagstuhl part of his territory to Archbishop Philipp Christoph of Trier. Georg II went into exile in Strasbourg, where he was joined by the ruling family of Hanau-Lichtenberg. He resided at "Fleckenstein Court" on Münstergasse street. Fleckenstein was administered by a member of the Fleckenstein-Bickenbach-Sulz line of his family.

== Regency of Hanau ==
=== Hanau-Lichtenberg ===
In Strasbourg, Count Philipp Wolfgang of Hanau-Lichtenberg wrote his will, in which he made his son Friedrich Casimir his sole hier and successor, based on the primogeniture decree, which was in force in the ruling family of Hanau since 1375. In case Friedrich Casimir was still underage when he inherited the county, his regents would be Georg II and Count Johann Ernst of Hanau-Münzenberg. Georg II was selected, because there were no male-line members of the Hanau-Lichtenberg line left, and Georg II was related in the female line, his grandmother being Anna Sibylle of Hanau-Lichtenberg, a daughter of Count Philipp IV. This was the only case in the history of Hanau where a regent was appointed who was of lower rank than his ward. However, Count Johann Ernst, who was the closest living relative, and had the proper feudal rank, however, he lived in faraway Hanau.

Philipp Wolfgang died on 24 February [O.S. 14 February] 1641. He was survived by his second wife, Dorothea Diana of Salm and his underage children Friedrich Casimir, Johann Philipp, Johann Reinhard II, Sophie Eleonore and Agatha Christine. As these children were underage, a guardian was needed. Georg II took up this task, although he had been offered an attractive alternative: to become governor of the Duchy of Württemberg, which had been confiscated by the Emperor.

=== Hanau-Münzenberg ===
Count Johann Ernst died on 12 January 1642, leaving Georg II as the only remaining guardian and regent. His ward, Count Friedrich Casimir, inherited Hanau-Münzenberg in a politically precarious situation:

- Even travelling to Hanau-Münzenberg through enemy territory was difficult. Friedrich Casimir had to travel in disguise, with only a numerically small company, including Georg II.
- The liege lords of several of Hanau-Münzenberg's possessions, especially the Archbishop of Mainz, but also the Elector of Saxony, the Landgrave of Hesse-Darmstadt, the Bishop of Würzburg, and the Abbey of Fulda, held that Friedrich Casimir was only distantly related to Johann Ernst and saw this as an opportunity to terminate the fief. Their legal position was fairly weak, since there was a clear family relationship between Johann Ernst and Friedrich Casimir, and moreover the inheritance treaty from 1610 between the Hanau-Lichtenberg and Hanau-Münzenberg lines clearly applied. However, in the confusion of the Thirty Years' War, things were decided by a nobleman's military power, not by the legality or otherwise of his legal position. Georg II acknowledged the problem and ensured his position was supported by Hesse-Kassel. Landgravine Amalie Elisabeth, the widow of Landgrave Wilhelm V who had been born a Countess of Hanau-Münzenberg and was Regent of Hesse-Kassel at the time, provided Georg II with diplomatic and political support. She aimed to preserve all of Hanau-Münzenberg's territory, because the county was heavily indebted to Hesse-Kassel. In return, Georg II as regent of Hanau-Münzenberg, signed an inheritance treaty with Hesse-Kassel, promising that if the House of Hanau were to die out in the male line, then Hanau-Münzenberg would fall to Hesse-Kassel. He also gave Hesse-Kassel the district of Schwarzenfels and the territory of the former monastery in Naumburg as securities for the debt.
- Hanau, the capital of the county, consisted to two legally separate cities: The old and the new town. The latter had been created at the turn of the 16th and 17th centuries to settle Calvinist refugees from France and the Spanish Netherlands (today's Belgium). City politics in New Hanau were dominated by wealthy merchants and traders who had acquired a very strong position in Hanau-Münzenberg due to their economic power. They intended to use the weak position of the new count and his regent to demand some concessions before he would accept his inheritance. After negotiating for ten days, Georg II concluded that he had no option but to give in to their demands. Their main demand was continuation of the religious status quo. Friedrich Casimir, like all counts from the Hanau-Lichtenberg line, was a Lutheran. Hanau-Münzenberg, however, had been Calvinist since the reign of Count Philipp Ludwig II (1576–1612). Fifty years earlier, Philipp Ludwig II had been able to prescribe the confession in his county under the principle cuius regio, eius religio. Georg II, however, found himself forced, not only to allow Calvinists to worship freely, but even to limit Lutheranism to the chapel in Hanau's city palace. Only in 1658 was Friedrich Casimir able to build a Lutheran church in Hanau, the St. Johann's church. In 1670, Hanau-Münzenberg officially became bi-confessional, although that did not stop the fierce debate among the confessions. It wasn't until 140 years later that the two churches in Hanau-Münzenberg could be united.

== Death ==
Georg II of Fleckenstein died on 31 January 1644 at Hanau, the last baron of the Fleckenstein-Dagstuhl line. He was buried in St. Mary's Church, Hanau.

Count Friedrich Casimir of Hanau was still considered underage in 1644, as the coming of age only happened at age 25. Count Georg Albrecht of Erbach was appointed as the new regent.

== Ancestors ==
Ancestors of Georg II of Fleckenstein-Dagstuhl

8. Georg I of Fleckenstein-Dagstuhl (d. 1553)
4. Ludwig of Fleckenstein-Dagstuhl (1542–1577)
9. Joanna of Salm-Kyrburg (d. 1595)
2. Philipp Wolfgang of Fleckenstein-Dagstuhl (d. 1618)
10. Philipp IV, Count of Hanau-Lichtenberg (1514–1590)
5. Anna Sibylle of Hanau-Lichtenberg (1542–1580)
11. Eleonore of Fürstenberg (1523–1544)
1. Georg II of Fleckenstein
12. Ulrich IX of Rappoltstein (c. 1493-1531)
6. Egenolf IV of Rappoltstein (1527–1585)
13. Anna Alexandria of Fürstenberg (1504–1581)
3. Anna Alexandria of Rappoltstein (1565–1610)
14. Johann V of Sayn-Hachenburg (1493–1529)
7. Elisabeth of Sayn (1529–1549)
15. Ottilie of Nassau-Saarbrücken (1492–1554)
