= Dorothea Diana of Salm =

- Born: 25 July 1604; Criechingen
- Died: 19 December 1672 (aged 68); Wörth
- Buried: Buchsweiler
- Noble family: House of Salm
- Spouses: Philip Louis of Rappoltstein; Philip Wolfgang, Count of Hanau-Lichtenberg
- Father: John IX of Salm-Kyrburg-Mörchingen
- Mother: Anna Catherine of Criechingen

Diana Dorothea of Salm (25 July 1604 in Criechingen – 19 December 1672 in Wörth) was the daughter of Wild- and Rhinegrave John IX of Salm-Kyrburg-Mörchingen and his wife, Baroness Anna Catherine of Criechingen and Puttigny. An hour after her birth, her twin sister Anna Amalia, later Countess of Königseck, was born.

== Life ==
Her father died while the twin sisters were still young. During the Thirty Years' War, their brothers and uncle served in the Swedish army; her brother Otto Louis rose to the ranke of General. The two girls and their mother often had to flee for the Catholic troops. Eventually they settled in Strasbourg. Here, Dorothea Diana married twice:

1. On 1 March 1636, she married Count Philip Louis of Rappoltstein (d. 25 February 1637). However, he died after nearly one year of marriage. This marriage remained childless.
2. On 18 May 1640, she married Count Philip Wolfgang of Hanau-Lichtenberg. (1595–1641). He, too, died after less than a year of marriage. This marriage also remained childless.

After her second marriage, she left Strasbourt. The couple first live at Lichtenberg Castle and later in Buchsweiler, the capital of Hanau-Lichtenberg. Philip Wolfgang died after less than a year after their marriage. At this time, five of the ten children from his first marriage, viz. Frederick Casimir, John Philip, Johann Reinhard II, Sophie Eleonore and Agatha Christine were still alive; they were all minors. Dorothea Diana took up their education and also provided some continuity to the regency of the county, when there were several deaths among the official regents of the county. Initially, the official regents were Count John Ernest of Hanau-Münzenberg and Baron George II of Fleckenstein-Dagstuhl. George II was a grandson of Anna Sibylle of Hanau-Lichtenberg, who was a daughter of Count Philip IV. After John Ernest died in 1642, George II acted as the sole regent. After George II died in 1644, Count George Albert of Erbach took up the guardianship. He died in 1647. Since this was only a few months before Frederick Casimir came of age on his 25th birthday, no new regent was appointed.

In 1651, Dorothea Diana decided that her step-children were old enough to fend for themselves. She left the residence in Buchsweiler and retired to her widow seat in Wörth, where she lived until she died in 1672.

== Death ==
She died on 19 December 1672 and was buried in Buchsweiler. A funeral sermon was published by Günther Heiler, Superintendent and Consistorial Councillor of Hanau-Lichtenberg, with contributions by Philipp Jacob Spener, Quirinus Moscherosch, and Georg Wilhelm Spener.
