= Friedrich Casimir =

Friedrich Casimir may refer to:

- Friedrich Casimir, Count of Hanau-Lichtenberg (1623–1685)
- Frederick Casimir Kettler (1650–1698), 1698), Duke of Courland and Semigallia
