= Magdalena Elisabeth of Hanau =

- Born: 28 March 1611
- Died: 26 February 1687 (aged 75)
- Noble family: House of Hanau
- Spouse: George Frederick Schenk of Limpurg-Speckfeld
- Father: Albert of Hanau-Münzenberg
- Mother: Ehrengard of Isenburg

Countess Magdalena Elisabeth of Hanau-Münzenberg (28 March 1611 – 26 February 1687) was a German noblewoman. She was a daughter of Count Albert of Hanau-Münzenberg-Schwarzenfels (1579-1635) and his wife, Countess Ehrengard of Isenburg (1577-1637).

== Life ==
On 28 March 1636, she married the Imperial Cupbearer, George Frederick Schenk of Limpurg-Speckfeld (27 June 1596 – 5 December 1651). He was a son of Eberhard Schenk of Limpurg-Speckfeld (1560-1622) and Countess Catherine of Hanau-Lichtenberg. During the Thirty Years' War, George Frederick served in the armies of Ernst von Mansfeld and King Gustavus Adolphus of Sweden.

Magdalena Elisabeth and George Frederick had at least three children:

- Francis (1637-1673)
- Vollrat (1641-1713), the last member of the Limpurg-Speckfeld line
- George Eberhard (1643-1705)

== Ancestors ==
Ancestors of Magdalena Elisabeth of Hanau

8. Philip III, Count of Hanau-Münzenberg (1526-1561)
4. Philip Louis I, Count of Hanau-Münzenberg (1553-1580)
9. Countess Palatine Helena of Simmern
2. Albert of Hanau-Münzenberg (1579-1635)
10. Philip IV, Count of Waldeck (1493-1574)
5. Magdalene of Waldeck-Wildungen (1558-1599)
11. Jutta of Isenburg (d. 1564)
1. Magdalena Elisabeth of Hanau-Münzenberg
12. Philip of Isenburg-Ronneburg (1467-1526)
6. Philip II of Ysenburg-Büdingen (1526-1596)
13. Amalia of Rieneck (1478-1543)
3. Ehrengard of Isenburg-Büdingen (1577-1637)
14. Philip of Solms-Braunfels (1494-1581)
7. Ehrengard of Solms-Braunfels (1536-1577)
15. Anna of Tecklenburg (d. 1554)
