= Sibylle Christine of Anhalt-Dessau =

Sibylle Christina of Anhalt-Dessau
- Countess of Hanau-Münzenberg; Countess of Hanau-Lichtenberg
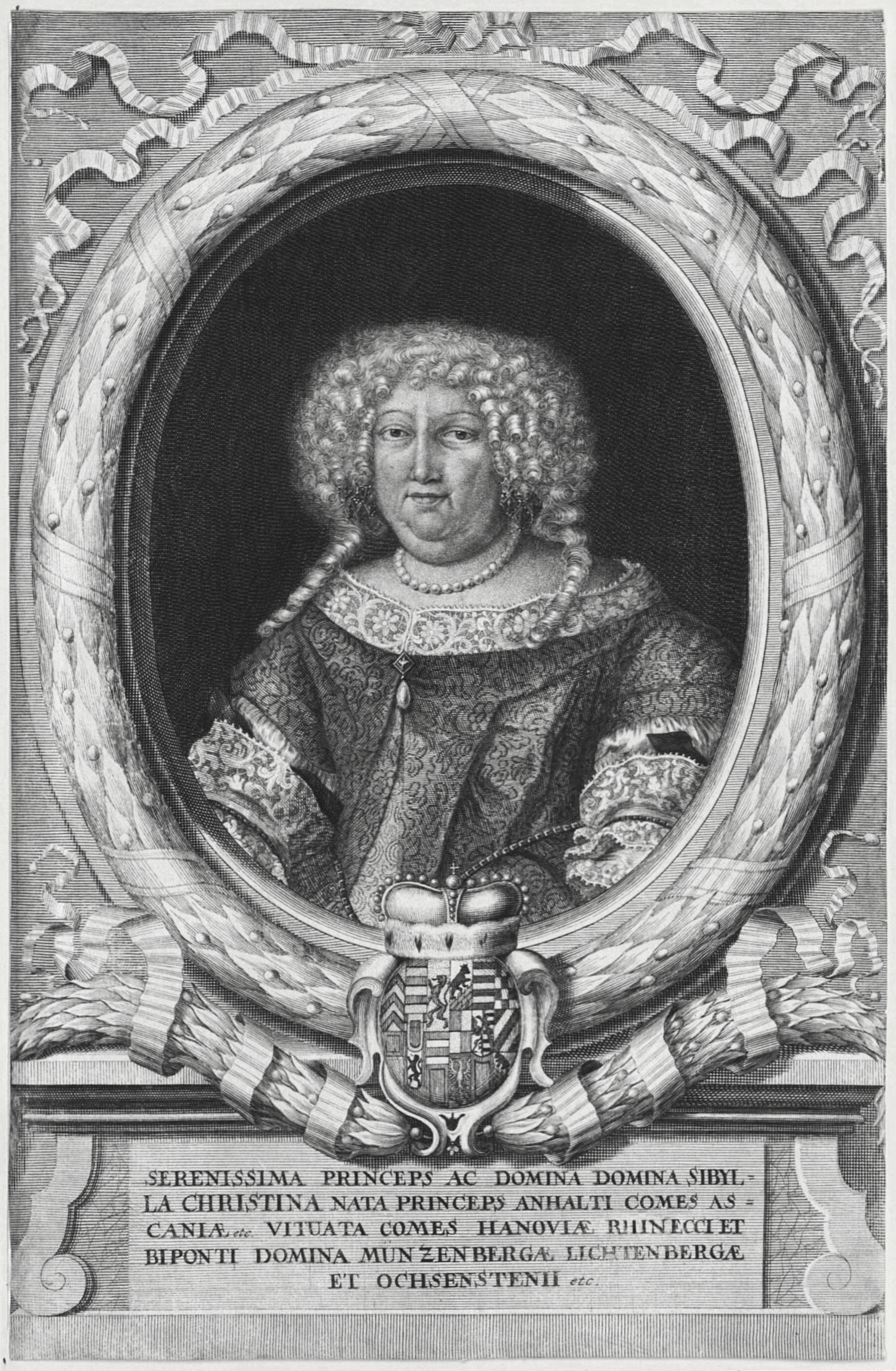
- Born: 11 July 1603; Dessau
- Died: 21 February 1686 (aged 82); Weimar
- Spouse: Philip Maurice, Count of Hanau-Münzenberg; Friedrich Casimir, Count of Hanau-Lichtenberg
- Issue: Philipp Ludwig III, Count of Hanau-Münzenberg
- House: House of Ascania
- Father: John George I, Prince of Anhalt-Dessau
- Mother: Countess Palatine Dorothea of Simmern

Sibylle Christine of Anhalt-Dessau (11 July 1603 in Dessau – 21 February 1686 in Hanau), was by birth a member of the House of Ascania and princess of Anhalt-Dessau. Through her two marriages she became Countess of Hanau-Münzenberg and Hanau-Lichtenberg.

Sibylle Christine was the sixth daughter of John George I, Prince of Anhalt-Dessau, but third-born daughter of his second wife Dorothea, daughter of John Casimir of Simmern.

== Life ==
In Dessau on 26 December 1627 Sybille Christine married Philip Maurice, Count of Hanau-Münzenberg. They had five children, 2 sons and 3 daughters, but all of them, except the eldest son and heir, Philip Louis III, died before their first year of life.

After the death of her husband in 1638, she acted as regent on behalf of his son Philip Louis III. After the premature death of her son in 1641, Sybille Christine moved to the official dower house of the House of Hanau, Schloss Steinau in Steinau an der Straße.

Philip Louis III was succeeded by his first cousin once removed John Ernest (a cousin of his late father and the last surviving male of the branch of Hanau-Münzenberg); however, he died in 1642 unmarried and childless. His successor was Frederick Casimir, head of the Lutheran branch of the Hanau-Lichtenberg family.

The accession of Frederick Casimir took place during the Thirty Years' War, which left him in a financially awkward situation. As Dowager Countess, Sibylle Christine put considerable strains on the county for her upkeep. To minimize her own expenses and avoid the required financial support for a new wife, she and Frederick Casimir were married on 13 May 1647. This union with the Dowager Countess had the effect of calming Frederick Casimir's Reformist subjects in Hanau-Münzenberg who looked upon the new Lutheran Count with suspicion. The marriage remained childless probably due to the great difference in age between the spouses: Sybille Christine was 20 years older than Frederick Casimir. The union was characterized by other differences as well, partly because Frederick Casimir relied on his wife's property to subsidize his spending habits.

After the death of her second husband in 1685, Sibylle Christine withdrew again to her dower house, Schloss Steinau. She died there one year later and was buried on 25 March 1686 in the family vault of the Marienkirche in Hanau.
