= Princess Dorothea Friederike of Brandenburg-Ansbach =

Dorothea Friederike of Brandenburg-Ansbach
- Countess of Hanau-Münzenberg; Countess of Hanau-Lichtenberg
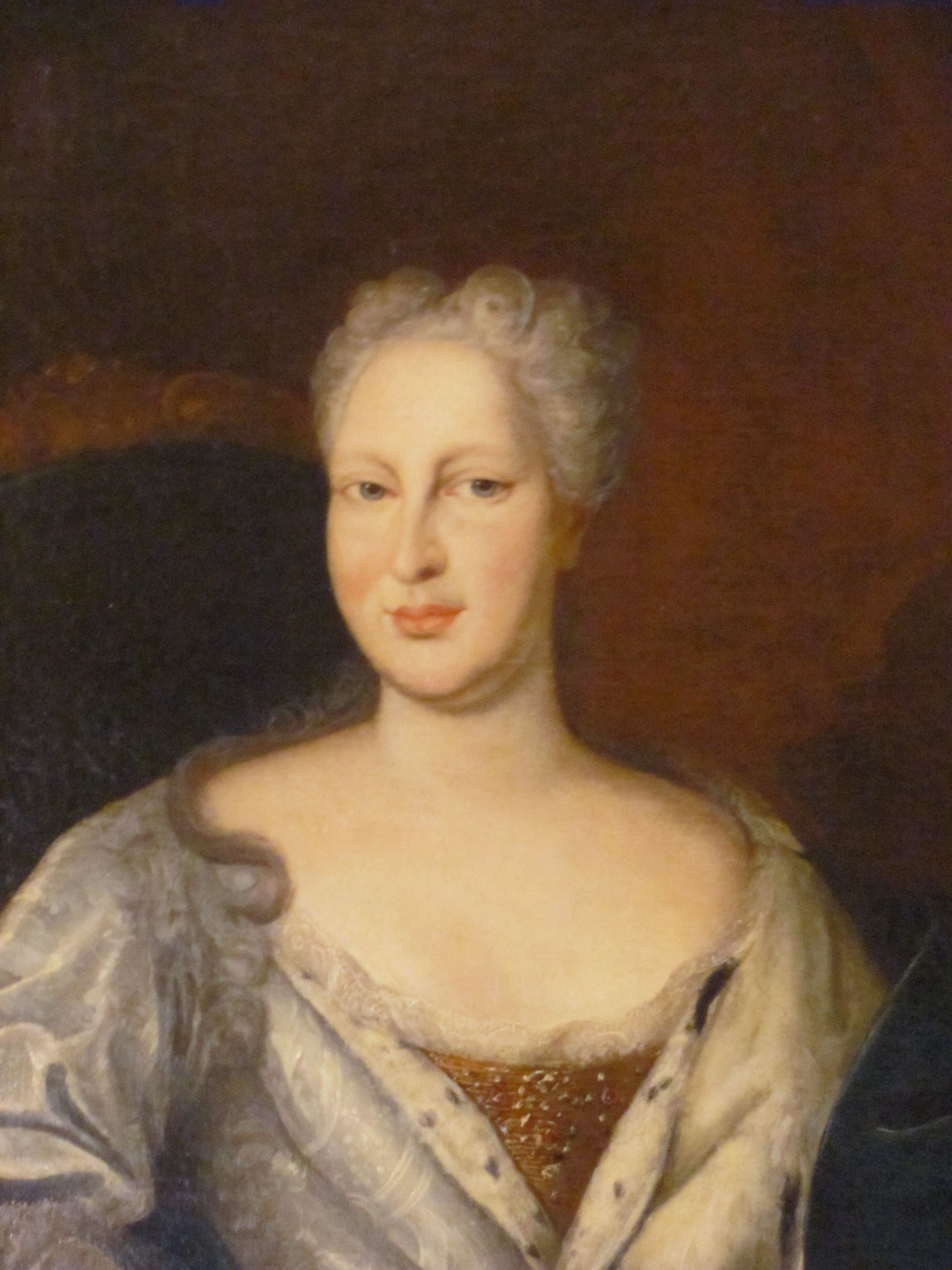
- Born: 12 August 1676; Ansbach
- Died: 13 March 1731 (aged 54); Hanau
- Burial: 17 or 25 March 1731; St. John's Church, Hanau (currently known as Old St. John's Church)
- Spouse: Johann Reinhard III of Hanau-Lichtenberg (m. 1699)
- Issue: Charlotte, Hereditary Princess of Hesse-Darmstadt
- House: Hohenzollern
- Father: John Frederick of Brandenburg-Ansbach
- Mother: Johanna Elisabeth of Baden-Durlach

Dorothea Friederike of Brandenburg-Ansbach (12 August 1676 – 13 March 1731) was the daughter of Margrave John Frederick of Brandenburg-Ansbach (1654–1686) and his first wife, Margravine Johanna Elisabeth of Baden-Durlach (1651–1680). She was a paternal half-sister of Queen Caroline of Great Britain, the wife of King George II.

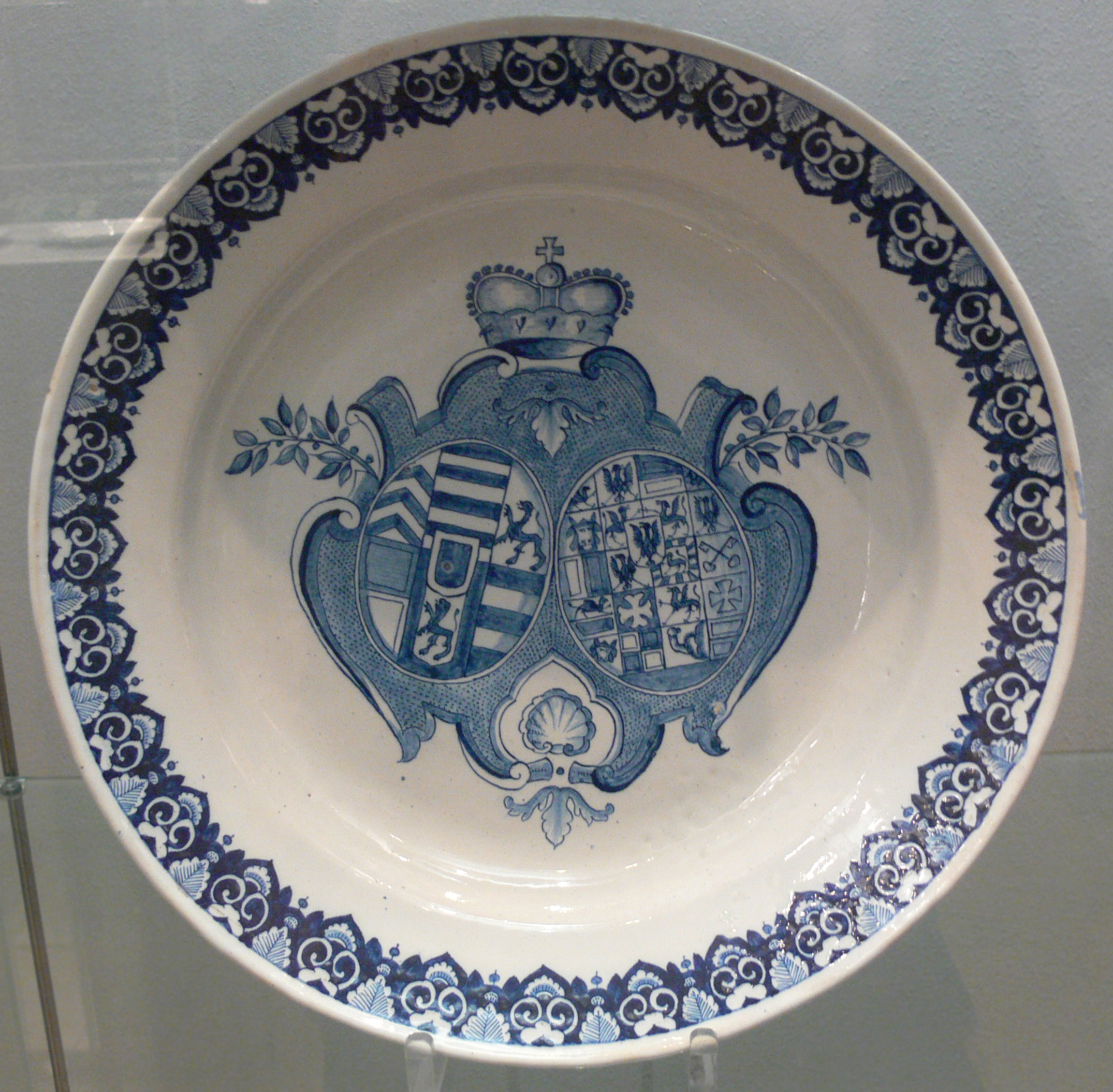
Alliance coat of arms of Johann Reinhard III of Hanau-Lichtenberg and Frederike Dorothea of Brandenburg-Ansbach, faience from Ansbach, probably made in 1724 on the occasion of their silver wedding

On 20 (or 30) August 1699, Dorothea Friederike married Count Johann Reinhard III of Hanau-Lichtenberg. She was the last Countess of Hanau. The marriage produced one daughter: Charlotte Christine Magdalene Johanna (1700–1726). Charlotte was the sole heiress of the county of Hanau and married on 5 April 1717 Crown Prince Louis VIII of Hesse-Darmstadt (1691–1768).

Friederike Dorothea died on 13 March 1731 and was buried on 17 or 25 March 1731 in the family vault of the Hanau counts in the St. John's Church (Hanau) (currently known as Old St. John's Church) in Hanau. The tomb was largely destroyed in the bombing of the Second World War.

== Ancestry ==
Ancestors of Princess Dorothea Friederike of Brandenburg-Ansbach

8. Joachim Ernest, Margrave of Brandenburg-Ansbach
4. Albert II, Margrave of Brandenburg-Ansbach
9. Sophie of Solms-Laubach
2. John Frederick, Margrave of Brandenburg-Ansbach
10. Joachim Ernst, Count of Oettingen-Oettingen
5. Sophie Margarete of Oettingen-Oettingen
11. Anne Sybille of Solms-Sonnenwalde
1. Princess Dorothea Friederike of Brandenburg-Ansbach
12. Frederick V, Margrave of Baden-Durlach
6. Frederick VI, Margrave of Baden-Durlach
13. Barbara of Württemberg
3. Johanna Elisabeth of Baden-Durlach (1651-1680)
14. John Casimir, Count Palatine of Kleeburg
7. Christina Magdalena of the Palatinate-Zweibrücken
15. Catherine of Sweden
