= Friedrich Casimir, Count of Hanau-Lichtenberg =

Count of Hanau-Lichtenberg

Friedrich Casimir
- Count of Hanau-Lichtenberg
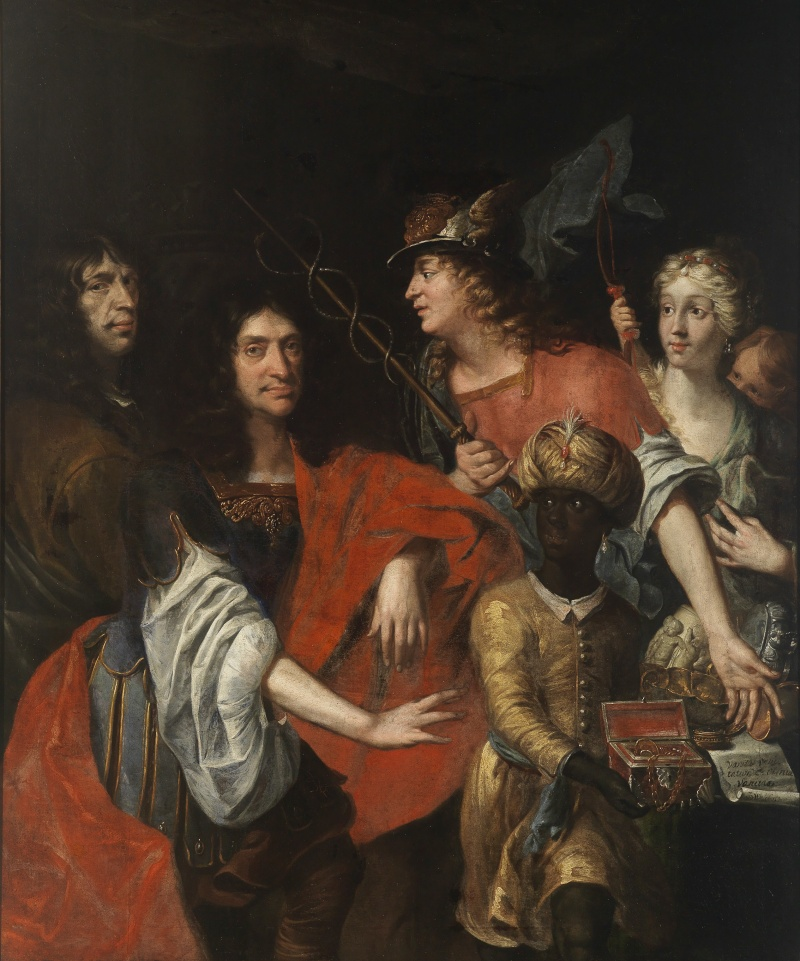
- Johann David Welcker :Allegory of the acquisition of Suriname by Count Friedrich Casimir of Hanau in 1669 (1676). Staatliche Kunsthalle Karlsruhe Inv. #1164
- Born: 4 August 1623; Bouxwiller
- Died: 30 March 1685 (aged 61); Hanau
- Buried: St. Johann Church in Hanau
- Noble family: House of Hanau
- Spouse: Sibylle Christine of Anhalt-Dessau
- Father: Philipp Wolfgang, Count of Hanau-Lichtenberg
- Mother: Johanna of Oettingen

Friedrich Casimir of Hanau (born 4 August 1623 in Bouxwiller; died 30 March 1685 in Hanau) was a member of the Hanau-Lichtenberg branch of the House of Hanau.

He was the ruling Count of Hanau-Lichtenberg from 1641 and of Hanau-Münzenberg from 1642.

== Childhood and youth ==
Friedrich Casimir was born in Bouxwiller (German: Buchsweiler), the residence of the county of Hanau-Lichtenberg, as the son of Count Philipp Wolfgang (1595–1641) and his wife, Countess Johanna of Oettingen-Oettingen (1602–1639). During his childhood, his parents and he had to flee to Strasbourg several times, due to the Thirty Years' War.

On 14 February 1641, Friedrich Casimir succeeded his father as ruler of the county of Hanau-Lichtenberg. Legally, he was still a minor at the time, so that a guardianship had to be set up. Just one year later, in 1642, he also inherited the County of Hanau-Münzenberg. For the first time since 1458 all parts of Hanau were again united in one hand.

From 1643 to 1645, he made the Grand Tour that was usual for youngers of his standing. He visited countries that were not affected by the Thirty Years' War: France, Spain, Italy, England and the Netherlands. He was probably safer there than in his war-torn homeland.

== Guardianship ==
Under the law at the time, he was a minor until the age of 25. A committee of guardians was established for him and his two brothers, Johann Philipp and Johann Reinhard II. Initially, the committee consisted of Johann Ernst of Hanau-Münzenberg and Baron Georg II of Fleckenstein-Dagstuhl, who was a great-grandson of Count Philipp IV of Hanau-Lichtenberg. When Johann Ernst died in 1642, the Baron remained as the sole guardian. After he died in 1644, Count Georg Albrecht of Erbach acted as guardian, until his death in 1647. Since only a few months remained until the age of majority, no further attempt was made to establish a guardianship.

== Family ==
When Friedrich Casimir took office in Hanau-Münzenberg, the county was financially in a precarious situation, due to the Thirty Years' War. When he arrived in Hanau, he was greeted by Sibylle Christine of Anhalt-Dessau, the widow of Count Philipp Moritz, who had been the ruling count until 1638. She had received Steinau Castle as her widow seat. As widow of a ruling count, she could raise substantial claims against the county. To avoid this, it was decided to marry Friedrich Casimir to the widow, who was 44 years old at the time, almost 20 years older than he. An added advantage of this marriage was that the Calvinist majority in the county was suspicious that the Lutheran count might undermine their position; the marriage with the Calvinist widow laid their fears to rest. The marriage was plagued by differences. One problem was that the count was continuously in financial difficulties and he sometimes dipped into his wife's resources to alleviate his problems.

The marriage with the elderly widow remained childless. Shortly before his death, Friedrich Casimir adopted his nephews Philipp Reinhard and Johann Reinhard III as his heirs.

== Rule ==
=== Inheriting Hanau-Münzenberg ===
When Count Johann Ernst of Hanau-Münzenberg died on 12 January 1642, Friedrich Casimir was his next-of-kin. He was only a distant relative, but he was nevertheless the closest male relative and his hereditary claims were confirmed in a treaty of inheritance between Hanau-Lichtenberg and Hanau-Münzenberg dated 1610. Accepting the throne was not without its problems. Friedrich Casimir had to travel through enemy territory in disguise, accompanied by his guardian Georg II of Fleckenstein-Dagstuhl and a small security detail. He arrived in Hanau on 21 January 1642.

Several liege lords of Hanau-Münzenberg, in particular the Archdiocese of Mainz, but also the Electorate of Saxony, Hesse-Darmstadt, the Bishopric of Würzburg and the Imperial Abbey of Fulda held that the family relationship between Friedrich Casimir and Johann Ernst was too distant and that Johann Ernst therefore had no male heir, so the fief was completed and should be terminated. However weak their position might have been legally, in the confused situation of the Thirty Years' War, the current power structure weighed more heavily than legal niceties. Georg of Fleckenstein-Dagstuhl appreciated the situation and made sure that Hesse-Kassel would back Friedrich Casimir. Amalie Elisabeth of Hanau-Münzenberg, the widow of Landgrave Wilhelm V of Hesse-Kassel, who was regent of Hesse-Kassel for her minor son Wilhelm VI, would provide diplomatic and political support. She aimed at Hanau-Münzenberg keeping all its territories, not least because the county was heavily indebted to Hesse-Kassel. In return, Friedrich Casimir signed a treaty of inheritance, promising that if Hanau-Münzenberg were to die out in the male line, the country would fall to Hesse-Kassel. This would eventually happen in 1736. Friedrich Casimir also gave Hesse-Kassel the district of Schwarzenfels and the Winery of Naumburg (the secularized Naumburg Abbey) as collateral for the debt.

Hanau, the capital of Hanau-Münzenberg, consisted at the time of the legally separate cities: Althanau ("Old Hanau") and Neuhanau ("New Hanau"). The latter had been settled at the turn of the 16th to the 17th century by Calvinist refugees from France and the Spanish Netherlands (present-day Belgium). Its leadership was composed of wealthy merchants and traders who took advantage of the weak position of the new count to negotiate favourable conditions, in particular, they demanded guarantees that the religious status quo would be maintained. After ten days of negotiating, Georg of Fleckenstein-Dagstuhl gave this guarantee, so that Friedrich Casimir could finally accept his inheritance.

Friedrich Casimir was a Lutheran, like the rest of the Hanau-Lichtenberg family. Hanau-Münzenberg, however, had been Calvinist since the days of count Philipp Ludwig II. Back then, Philipp Ludwig II had been able to decide the denomination for himself and his subjects under the principle of Cuius regio, eius religio, Friedrich Casimir not only had to allow the Calvinists to retain their religion; initially Friedrich Casimir could only hold Lutheran services for himself and his court in the chapel in the City Palace. It wasn't until 1658 that he was able to build the Lutheran Johann Church, with substantial contributions from foreign Lutherans, in particular Elector Johann Georg I of Saxony, after whom the church was named. Lutheran congregation were formed in many communities in the county, leading to considerable controversy.

In 1650 and 1670, the two sides in the religious dispute came to agree on a compromise. The 1670 compromise is known as the Religionshauptrezeß ("religious main recess"). The compromise puts the two Protestant denominations on an equal footing and gives each its own church administration, so that there were two established churches in the County of Hanau and the count had to waive his jus reformandi. The Religionshauptrezeß became a permanent and solid foundation for a bi-confessional county until the early 19th century. It did not, however, stop the continuing debate between the two confessions. It wasn't until 1818 that the two churches formally merged.

=== The political framework ===
Under the Peace of Westphalia the county of Hanau got off lightly. The county was allowed to keep most of the territory it had held before 1618. Friedrich Casimir succeeded in re-establishing a balanced relationship with the imperial court in Vienna and was appointed as imperial councillor by Emperor Ferdinand II. Even so, the county suffered from a substantial debt, which burdened Friedrich Casimir's entire reign. This was particularly problematic because Friedrich Casimir lacked any sense of financial matters. His court was modeled on the large Baroque courts and his expenses exceeded the capacity of his county. In order to finance his expenses, such as his art collection and his wax museum, he resorted to selling off real estate, ultimately selling the district of Rodheim to Hesse-Homburg for 9000 taler.

The political landscape in which Friedrich Casimir had to operate, remained marked by uncertainty, even after the Peace of Westphalia. This was particularly true for the Hanau-Lichtenberg part of the country, which was within reach of Louis XIV and had repeatedly been occupied during the war. The part of Hanau-Lichtenberg on the left bank of the Rhine had been separated from the Holy Roman Empire by the Peace of Westphalia and were placed under the sovereignty of the French crown. After the Peace of Nijmegen of 1678 and a verdict of the Chamber of Reunion in 1681, Friedrich Casimir had to pay homage to the French king for these areas. In 1672, French troops even occupied Friedberg, Aschaffenburg and Seligenstadt. Hanau had declared itself neutral, but was completely surrounded by French troops.

Among his advisors were the doctor and Alchemist Friedrich Kretschmar, a vagabond and princely advisor with a dubious reputation, Swedish councillor Bengt Skytte, a self-styled philosopher, Johann Joachim Becher, a doctor and economic theorist, Landgrave Georg Christian, a soldier and diplomat, and the author Johann Michael Moscherosch. They provided no counterweight to Friedrich Casimir's ambition.

=== Successful projects ===
After decades of construction, the construction of the National High School was completed in 1665. The Lutheran School in Hanau, which had been founded in 1647, was expanded to a Lutheran High School in 1680. In 1813, it would be converted to a Realschule. During Friedrich Casimir's reign, one of the first faience manufacturing plants in Germany was founded by Daniel Behaghel and Jacob van der Walle, using a countly privilege issued on 5 March 1661; it would operate successfully until the early 19th century. In 1678, the Hanauer Zeitung, one of Germany's oldest newspapers, was founded. Friedrich Casimir was a member of the literary Fruitbearing Society.

Several treaties were concluded with the Archdiocese of Mainz and the Bishopric of Würzburg, which were both administered by Johann Philipp von Schönborn in apersonal union, on the one hand resolving disputes which had arisen during the Thirty Years' War, on the other hand exchanging territories in order to make both countries more convex.

To compensate for the loss of population of the war, he promoted immigration of Swiss people from the Bernese Oberland into the county of Hanau-Lichtenberg. These people held Calvinist beliefs and Hanau-Lichtenberg was still predominantly Lutheran, but Calvinism was tolerated.

=== Fantasies ===
Many of Count Friedrich Casimir's projects remained castles in the sky. These include an Academy of Sciences and Arts. It would be established in Hanau and named Sophopolis.

The high point of his fantastic projects was the foundation of the Hanauish Indies, a colony that would arise on the Orinoco river on the north coast of South America. The idea probably came from Johann Joachim Becher. This project progressed as far as a final contract with the Dutch West India Company. Friedrich Casimir probably already saw himself as king of a tropical empire, however, he was derided as King of Cockaigne by the population of Hanau.

What was lacking was the money to implement such a project. Consequently, nothing happened in South America, and the project left behind huge debts in the county of Hanau. To compensate for this financial disaster, Friedrich Casimir considered pledging the county of Hanau-Lichtenberg to the Duke of Lorraine and converting to the Catholic faith in order to secure support from the Catholic side. Landgrave Georg Christian of Hesse-Homburg was alleged to have stood behind this project. He was also alleged to try to transfer the district of Dorheim to his own Landgraviate, including the salt mine of Bad Nauheim, which was vital for the economy of Hanau. Friedrich Casimir's relatives opposed this plan; to get them out of the way, Georg Christian tried to have himself appointed regent of Hanau.

=== Disempowerment ===
Friedrich Casimir's relatives then pulled the emergency brake. His brother, Johann Philipp of Hanau-Lichtenberg staged a coup in November 1669 and seized power while Friedrich Casimir was absent. However, his emergency government broke down after three days. His relatives and the guardians of successors, Christian II, Count Palatine of Zweibrücken-Birkenfeld and Countess Palatine Anna Magdalena of Birkenfeld-Bischweiler asked Emperor Leopold I to be appointed regents and heads of a new administration. They were appointed co-regent and given the right to veto any decision made by Friedrich Casimir. Friedrich Casimir's councillor were dismissed and a new government was installed, led by President of the Chamber Johann Georg Seyfried, who was later ennobled as Baron von Edelsheim. In practice, this limitation of the Count's power often led to conflicts with the government. The regents tried to implement rigorous financial policies to repay government debt; the Count was still far more generous. In the end, a sweeping financial turnaround did not materialize.

== Death and inheritance ==
Friedrich Casimir died on 30 March 1685 in Hanau. He was buried in the crypt of the Lutheran St. Johann Church in Hanau.

The County of Hanau-Münzenberg was inherited by his nephew Philipp Reinhard, the County of Hanau-Lichtenberg by his nephew Johann Reinhard III. This division was reconfirmed in a treaty in 1691.

Friedrich Casimir's widow, Sibylle Christine of Anhalt-Dessau, survived him by less than a year. She was buried in the crypt of the Reformed St. Mary's Church, also in Hanau.

== Ancestors ==
Ancestors of Friedrich Casimir, Count of Hanau-Lichtenberg

8. Philipp V, Count of Hanau-Lichtenberg (1541–1599)
4. Johann Reinhard I, Count of Hanau-Lichtenberg (1568–1625)
9. Ludowika Margaretha of Zweibrücken-Bitsch (1540–1569)
2. Philipp Wolfgang, Count of Hanau-Lichtenberg (1595–1641)
10. Wolfgang of Hohenlohe-Neuenstein (1546–1610)
5. Maria Elisabeth of Hohenlohe-Neuenstein (1576–1605)
11. Magdalena of Nassau-Dillenburg (1547–1643)
1. Friedrich Casimir, Count of Hanau-Lichtenberg
12. Gottfried of Öttingen (1554–1622)
6. Ludwig Eberhard of Öttingen-Öttingen (1577–634)
13. Johanna of Hohenlohe-Neuenstein (1557–1585)
3. Johanna of Oettingen (1602–1639)
14. Georg III, Count of Erbach-Breuberg (1548–1605)
7. Margarethe von Erbach (1576–1636)
15. Anna of Solms (1557–1586)

== Footnotes ==
Friedrich Casimir, Count of Hanau-Lichtenberg House of Hanau Born: 4 August 1623 Died: 30 March 1685
Preceded by Philipp Wolfgang	Count of Hanau-Lichtenberg; 1641–1680	Succeeded by Johann Reinhard III
Preceded by Johann Ernst	Count of Hanau-Münzenberg; 1642–1680	Succeeded by Philipp Reinhard
