= John IX of Salm-Kyrburg-Mörchingen =

Wild- and Rhinegrave of Kyrburg, Count of Salm

- Born: 1575
- Died: 1623 (aged 47–48)
- Noble family: House of Salm
- Spouse: Anna Catherine of Criechingen
- Father: Otto I of Salm-Kyrburg-Mörchingen
- Mother: Ottilie of Nassau-Weilburg

John IX of Salm-Kyrburg-Mörchingen (1575–1623) was Wild- and Rhinegrave of Kyrburg and Count of Salm. He was the son of Otto I (1538–1607) and Ottilie of Nassau-Weilburg (1546-1604). Many of his relatives served as soldiers in Swedish service, including his brother John Casimir of Salm-Kyrburg (1577–1651). Because of this, the family was often on the run during the Thirty Years' War.

== Marriage and issue ==
He had since about 1593 married to Anna Catherine of Criechingen (d. 1638). They had the following children:

- John Casimir (died young)
- John Philip (died in 1638 in the Battle of Rheinfelden)

married in 1634 Countess Anna Juliane of Erbach-Erbach (1614–1637)

- Otto Louis (1597–1634)
- John X (died: c. 1634)
- George (died: c. 1634)
- Mary Elizabeth (died: after 1626)
- Dorothea Diana (1604–1672)

married firstly in 1636 Lord Philip Louis of Rappoltstein (born: 22 September 1601 – died: 25 February 1637)
married secondly in 1640 Count Philip Wolfgang of Hanau-Lichtenberg (1595–1641)

- Anna Amalia (1604–1676) (twin sister of Diana Dorothea)

married firstly c. 1630 with Michael of Freyberg, Baron of Justingen and Öpfingen (d. 1641)
married secondly c. 1642 with Count Kaspar Bernhard II of Rechenberg and Aichen (1588–1651)
married thirdly c. 1653 with Count Hugo of Königsegg-Rothenfels (1596–1666)

- Esther (?)
