= Otto Louis of Salm-Kyrburg-Mörchingen =

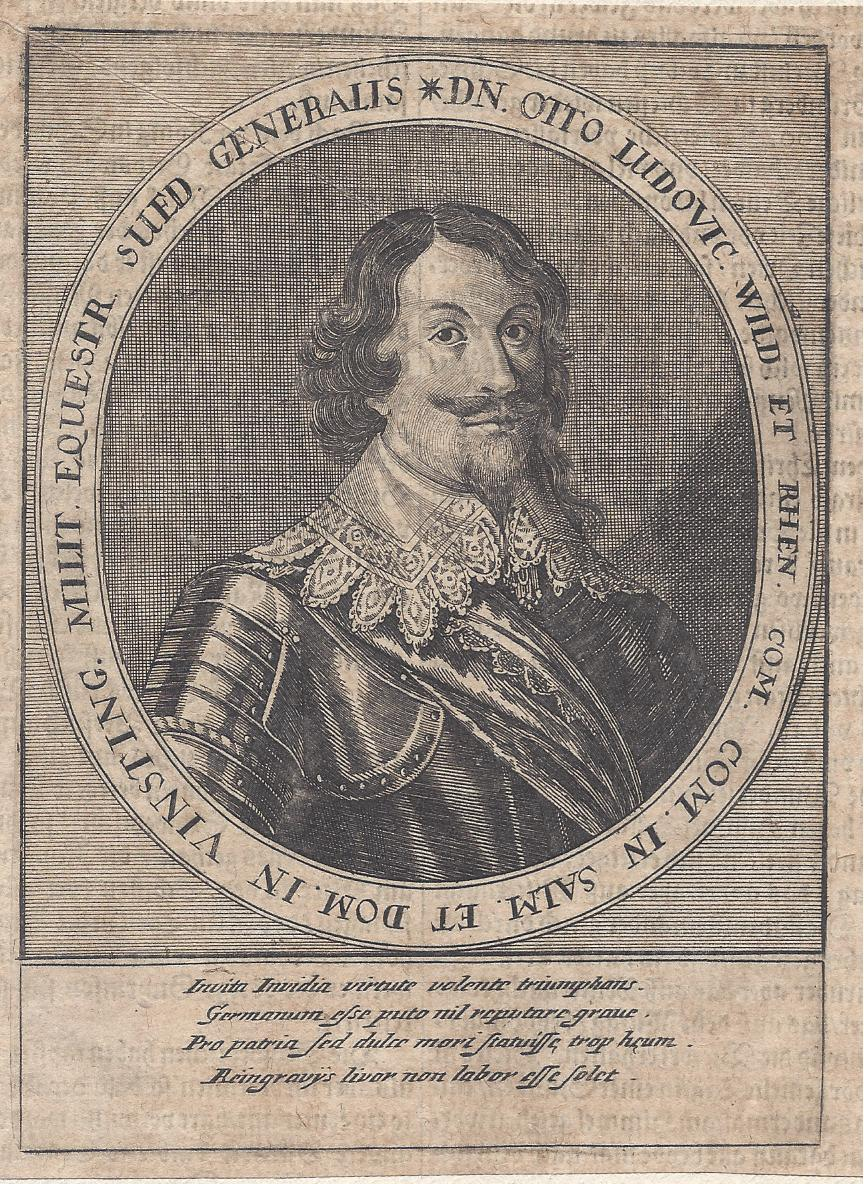
- Engraving of Otto Louis
- Born: 13 October 1597
- Died: 6 October 1634 (aged 36); Speyer
- Spouse: Anna Magdalene of Hanau
- Issue: Wild- and Rhinegrave John XI of Salm-Kyrburg-Mörchingen
- Father: John IX of Salm-Kyrburg-Mörchingen
- Mother: Anna Catherine, Baroness of Criechingen

Otto Louis of Salm, Wild- and Rhinegrave of Kyrburg and Mörchingen (13 October 1597 – 6 October 1634, Speyer) was a Swedish general during the Thirty Years' War. He was governor in the Alsace and Commander of the Swedish troops in the Upper Rhine. He died of the plague at Speyer and was buried in Strasbourg Cathedral.

His parents were John IX of Salm-Kyrburg-Mörchingen (1575–1623) and Anna Catherine, Baroness of Criechingen (d. 1638).

== Married and issue ==
In August 1633 he married Anna Magdalene of Hanau. She was the daughter of Count Johann Reinhard I of Hanau-Lichtenberg (1569–1625) and Countess Maria Elisabeth of Hohenlohe-Neuenstein (1576–1605). She was also the widow of Lothar of Criechingen (d. 1629) with whom she had a son: Francis Ernest III, Count of Criechingen (d. 1677).

With Otto Louis she had another son, Wild- and Rhinegrave John XI (born: 17 April 1635; died: 16 November 1688 in Flonheim, buried in the church of Kirn). He was born after his father's death. John XI married on 27 December 1669 to Countess Palatine Elisabeth Johanna of Veldenz (born: 22 February 1653; died: 5 February 1718). They had no children. The line Salm-Kyrburg-Mörchingen died out with John XI's death.

== Bibliography ==
- Karl Wittich (1887). "Otto Ludwig, Wild- und Rheingraf" . Allgemeine Deutsche Biographie (in German). Vol. 24. Leipzig: Duncker & Humblot. pp. 730–734.
