= Johann Ernst, Count of Hanau-Münzenberg =

- Born: 13 June 1613; Schwarzenfels
- Died: 12 January 1642 (aged 28); Hanau
- Noble family: House of Hanau
- Father: Albrecht of Hanau-Münzenberg
- Mother: Ehrengard of Isenburg-Büdingen

Johann Ernst of Hanau-Münzenberg-Schwarzenfels (13 June 1613 in Schwarzenfels – 12 January 1642 in Hanau), was the last Count of the Hanau-Münzenberg line. He succeeded his grand-nephew Philipp Ludwig III in 1641. When Johann Ernst died in 1642, Hanau-Münzenberg fell to the Hanau-Lichtenberg line.

== Youth ==
Johann Ernst was the son of Count Albrecht of Hanau-Münzenberg-Schwarzenfels and his wife, Countess Ehrengard of Isenburg-Büdingen.

Johann Ernst was educated at the school of the former convent in Schlüchtern, which is now called the Ulrich-von-Hutten-Gymnasium, and the University of Basel. After completing his studies, he undertook a Grand Tour to France. He returned home in 1633. The Thirty Years' War forced him and his family to Worms and later to Strasbourg, where they faced great financial difficulties. After his father died there, he followed his mother to Frankfurt.

Unlike his father, he did not challenge his nephew's right to rule Hanau-Münzenberg alone and did not demand a role as co-regent. He got on well with the ruling count, his nephew Philipp Moritz and his wife Sibylle Christine of Anhalt-Dessau.

== Reign ==
Philipp Ludwig III died on 21 November 1641 at the age of 9. With his death, the main Hanau-Münzenberg line died out in the male line, and the county fell to Johann Ernst, as the only male representative of the collateral line Hanau-Münzenberg-Schwarzenfels.

Shortly after ascending the throne, he became engaged to Susanna Margarete of Anhalt-Dessau, a sister of Sibylle Christine. However, he died before they could marry. Susanna Margarethe later married Johann Philipp of Hanau-Lichtenberg. Her sister, Sibylla Christina, married Johann Philipp's elder brother, who was Johann Ernst's successor, Friedrich Casimir. Both marriages remained childless.

== Death ==
Johann Ernst died of smallpox on 12 January 1642, after reigning for only seven weeks. The attending physicians, including Peter de Spina III, had only recognized the disease very late and had treated him with laxatives and bloodletting when he was dying.

He was buried on 26 February 1642 in the family vault in the St. Mary's Church in Hanau, which had to be extended first, as it was full. The metal coffin in which he was buried, was stolen in 1812, during the Napoleonic Wars. His body and corpses from other stolen coffins, were reburied in a common coffin.

Johann Ernst was succeeded by Friedrich Casimir, who was also Count of Hanau-Lichtenberg, thereby reuniting Hanau in a single hand, after a 184-year split. As Friedrich Casimir was still a minor, he stood under the regency of Baron Georg II of Fleckenstein-Dagstuhl.

== Ancestors ==
Ancestors of Johann Ernst, Count of Hanau-Münzenberg

8. Philipp III, Count of Hanau-Münzenberg (1526–1561)
4. Philipp Ludwig I, Count of Hanau-Münzenberg (1553–1580)
9. Countess Palatine Helena of Simmern
2. Albrecht of Hanau-Münzenberg (1579–1635)
10. Philipp IV, Count of Waldeck (1493–1574)
5. Magdalene of Waldeck-Wildungen (1558–1599)
11. Jutta of Isenburg (d. 1564)
1. Johann Ernst, Count of Hanau-Münzenberg
12. Philipp of Isenburg-Ronneburg (1467–1526)
6. Philipp II of Ysenburg-Büdingen (1526–1596)
13. Amalia of Rieneck (1478–1543)
3. Ehrengard of Isenburg-Büdingen (1577–1637)
14. Philipp of Solms-Braunfels (1494–1581)
7. Ehrengard of Solms-Braunfels (1536–1577)
15. Anna of Tecklenburg (d. 1554)

Johann Ernst, Count of Hanau-Münzenberg House of Hanau Born: 13 June 1613 Died: 12 January 1642
Preceded by Philipp Ludwig III	Count of Hanau-Münzenberg; 1641–1642	Succeeded by Friedrich Casimir
