= Countess Catharina Belgica of Nassau =

Countess of Hanau-Münzenberg (1578–1648)

- Countess of Hanau-Münzenberg
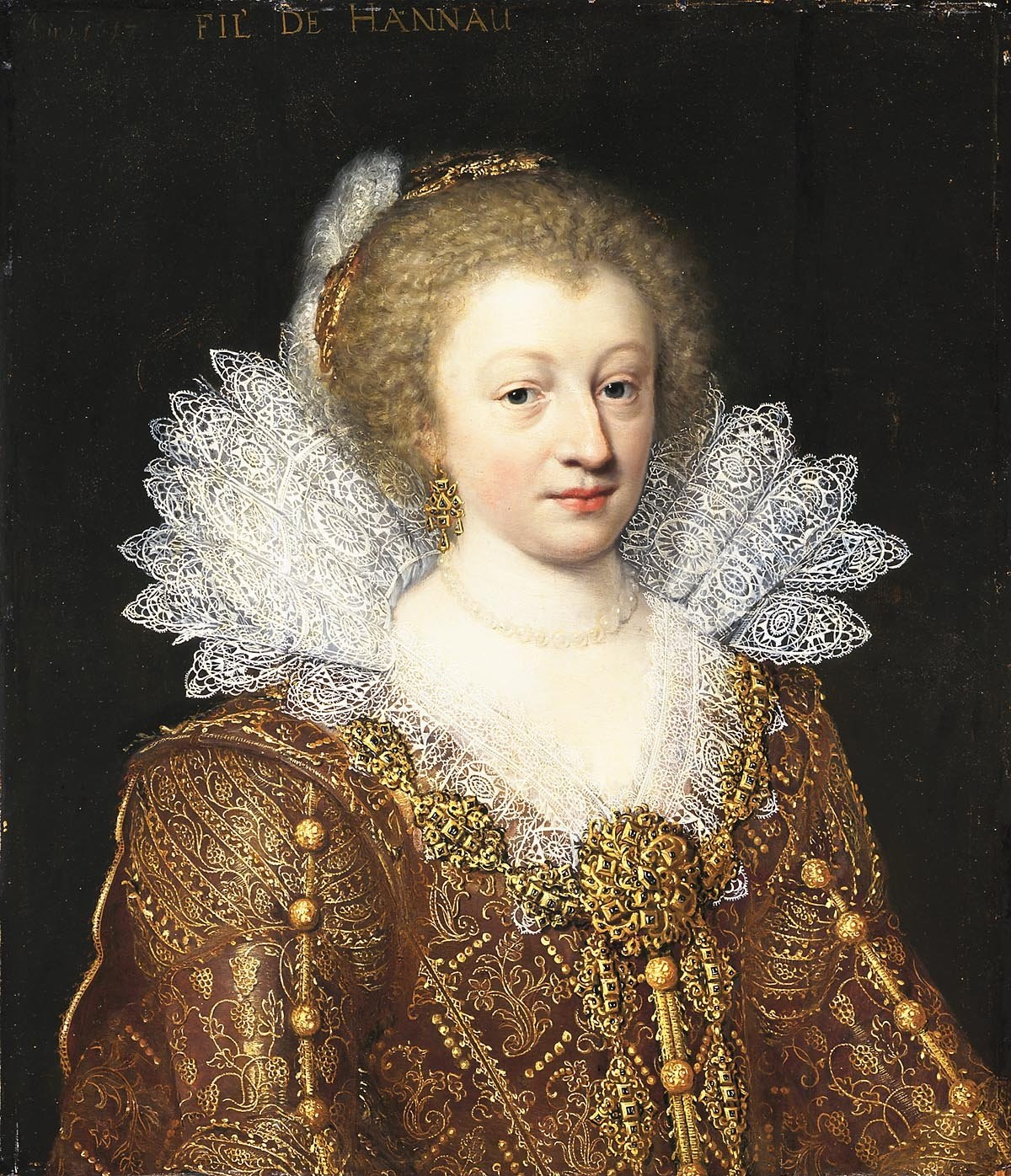
- Countess Catharina Belgica of Nassau, by Jan Anthonisz van Ravesteyn (1617)
- Born: 31 July 1578; Antwerp
- Died: 12 April 1648 (aged 69); Hanau
- Noble family: Nassau
- Spouse: Philip Louis II, Count of Hanau-Münzenberg
- Issue Detail: Amalia Elisabeth; Philipp Moritz
- Father: William the Silent
- Mother: Charlotte of Bourbon

Catharina Belgica of Nassau (31 July 1578 – 12 April 1648) was a countess of Hanau-Münzenberg by her marriage to Philip Louis II, Count of Hanau-Münzenberg. She was regent of Hanau-Münzenberg during the minority of her son from 1612 until 1626.

== Biography ==
=== Early life ===
She was the third daughter of William the Silent and his third spouse Charlotte of Bourbon.

Catharina Belgica was born in Antwerp. After her father had been assassinated in 1584, her aunt Catherine took her to Arnstadt, while most of her sisters were raised by Louise de Coligny. Her older sister Juliana would later criticize Catharina's Lutheran education.

In 1596, during a wedding feast in Dillenburg that lasted from 23 October - 3 November, she married Philip Louis II, Count of Hanau-Münzenberg, with whom she had ten children in just fifteen years.

=== Regent ===
When her husband died in 1612, Catharina Belgica became regent for her son Philip Maurice. When emperor Ferdinand II requested passage through Hanau for his coronation in Frankfurt in 1618, she refused him entry. Her territories were ravaged by imperial troops in 1621, and she and her children had to evacuate to The Hague.

In 1626, her son took over government. When king Gustavus Adolphus of Sweden liberated Hanau from Imperial occupation in 1631, it was Catharina Belgica who issued negotiations with the Swedish king and successfully secured the state for her son, and she guarded the alliance between Sweden and Hanau in cooperation with her daughter, the regent of Hesse-Cassel.

She died, aged 69, in The Hague.

== Family ==
Her marriage with Philip Louis II of Hanau-Münzenberg produced 10 children, of which eight lived to adulthood:

1. Charlotte Louise (1597–1649 Kassel), died unmarried
2. Daughter (29 July 1598 – 9 August 1598), died unbaptised
3. Philip Ulrich (2 January 1601 – 7 April 1604 Steinau), died in childhood
4. Amalia Elisabeth (1602–1651 Kassel), married to William V, Landgrave of Hesse-Kassel
5. Katharina Juliane (1604–1668 Hanau), married first on 11 September 1631 to Count Albert Otto II of Solms-Laubach, Rödelheim and Assenheim and second on 31 March 1642 to Moritz Christian von Wied-Runkel
6. Philip Maurice (1605–1638), buried in the Marienkirche in Hanau
7. Wilhelm Reinhard (1607–1630 Aachen), buried in the Marienkirche in Hanau
8. Henry Louis (1609–1632) died during the Siege of Maastricht
9. Frederick Louis (27 July 1610 – 4 October 1628 Paris), buried in the family tomb of the Duke of Bouillon in Sedan
10. Jakob Johann (1612–1636 Zabern), buried in St. Nicholas in Strasbourg

== Ancestry ==
Ancestors of Countess Catharina Belgica of Nassau

8. John V, Count of Nassau-Siegen
4. William I, Count of Nassau-Siegen
9. Elisabeth of Hesse-Marburg
2. William the Silent
10. Bodo III, Count of Stolberg-Wernigerode
5. Juliana of Stolberg-Wernigerode
11. Anna of Eppstein-Königstein
1. Catharina Belgica of Nassau
12. Louis, Prince of La Roche-sur-Yon
6. Louis, Duke of Montpensier
13. Louise de Bourbon, Duchess of Montpensier
3. Charlotte of Bourbon
14. Jean de Longwy
7. Jacqueline de Longwy
15. Jeanne of Angoulême

== Sources ==
- Catharina Belgica: biography on Worldroots
