= Philipp Moritz, Count of Hanau-Münzenberg =

17th century Holy Roman Empire count

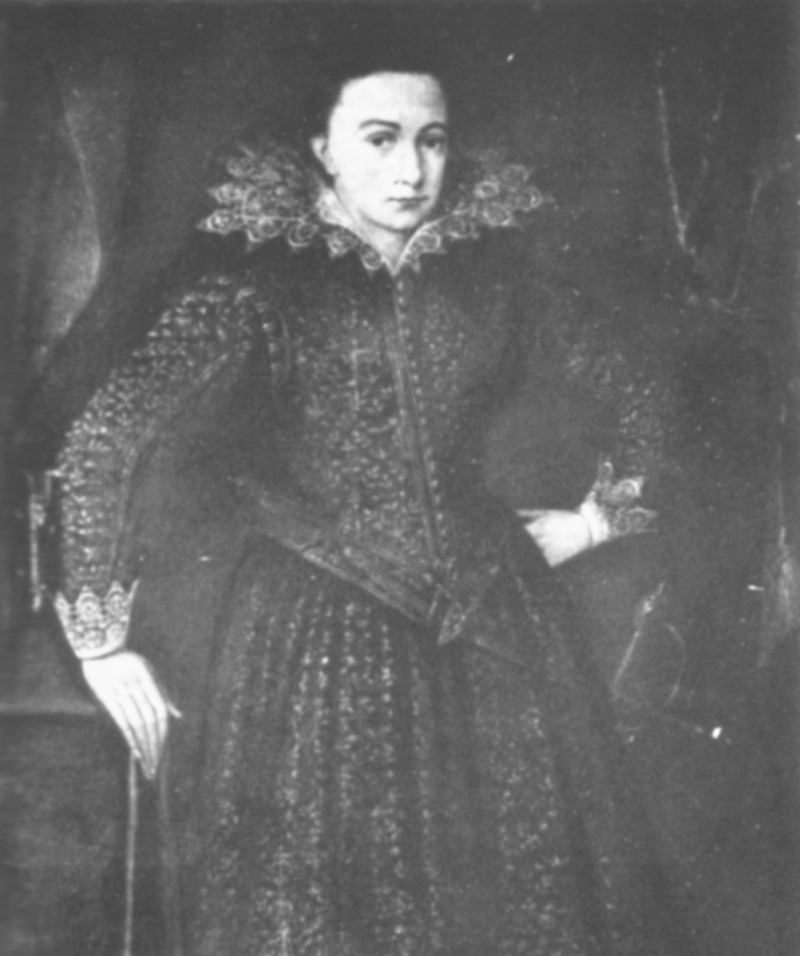
- Philipp Moritz, Count of Hanau-Münzenberg
- Born: 25 August 1605
- Died: 3 August 1638 (aged 32); Hanau
- Buried: Church of St. Mary in Hanau
- Noble family: House of Hanau
- Spouse: Sibylle Christine of Anhalt-Dessau
- Issue: Philipp Ludwig III, Count of Hanau-Münzenberg
- Father: Philipp Ludwig II, Count of Hanau-Münzenberg
- Mother: Countess Catharina Belgica of Nassau

Philipp Moritz of Hanau-Münzenberg (25 August 1605 – 3 August 1638 in Hanau) succeeded his father as Count of Hanau-Münzenberg in 1612.

== Life ==
Philipp Moritz was the son of Count Philipp Ludwig II of Hanau-Münzenberg and his wife, Princess Catharina Belgica (1578–1648), a daughter of William the Silent.

== Youth ==
Philipp Moritz was seven years old when his father died and he inherited Hanau-Münzenberg. His father's will stipulated that his mother, Princess Catharina Belgica of Nassau, should be the sole regent and guardian, and the Imperial Supreme Court confirmed this.

At the age of eight, he was sent to the school that had been established after the Reformation in the buildings of the former monastery at Schlüchtern, which is today the Ulrich von Hutten-Gymnasium. In 1613, he continued his education at University of Basel (where his grandfather had also studied), in Geneva and Sedan.

== Reign ==
=== End of the regency ===
Count Philipp Moritz's rule began with an altercation between himself and his mother, Princess Catharina Belgica, about the termination of the regency and nature and the size of her widow seat. She wanted to act as co-regent, even after his 25th birthday, the age of consent under the common law, despite an agreement closed in 1628 and an opinion from the Law Faculty of the University of Marburg. Philipp Moritz, tried to remove his mother from the government. They took their case to the Imperial Supreme Court and treated each other rudely; Philipp Moritz even removed his mother from the countly palace in Hanau. However, he compensated her for this in 1629. They never managed to properly wind up the regency. On the other hand, Philipp Moritz did manage to settle with his cousin Johann Ernst the fierce dispute which his father had had with Johann Ernst's father, his uncle Albrecht of Hanau-Münzenberg-Schwarzenfels, about the primogeniture and Albrecht's apanage.

=== The Thirty Years' War and exile ===
One reason the regency was never properly wound up, was the Thirty Years' War, which approached Hanau around 1630. When the Imperial troops reached Hanau, Philipp Moritz chose their side, in order to retain the military command of his capital. He was appointed Colonel and was expected to provide three companies. In November 1631, Swedish troops occupied Hanau and King Gustavus Adolphus of Sweden entered the city. Philipp Moritz decided to change sides. He was a Calvinist and for him choosing between the Catholic Emperor and the Lutheran Swedish king may have been like a choice between Scylla and Charybdis. Gustavus Adolphus appointed him to colonel and gave him a Swedish regiment. As a reward for his changing side, he gave him the district of Orb and the shares the Electorate of Mainz had held in the former County of Rieneck and the districts of Partenstein, Lohrhaupten, Bieber and Alzenau. He gave Philipp Moritz's brothers, Heinrich Ludwig (1609–1632) and Jakob Johann (1612–1636) the town and district of Steinheim, which was also a former possession of Mainz. These possessions were lost when the Catholic side gained the upper hand after the Battle of Nördlingen in September 1634. Changing sides again would make Philipp Moritz seem untrustworthy, so he decided to flee. He fled to Metz and from there via Chalon, Rouen and Amsterdam to his Orange-Nassau relatives in the Hague and Delft. He left his youngest brother, Jakob Johann, as regent in Hanau, because Jakob Johann was considered politically neutral.

Hanau was a well-developed fortress town and remained occupied until 1638 by Swedish troops under General Jakob von Ramsay, who controlled the surrounding countryside from Hanau. He excluded Jakob Johann from any influence and so the later left the city.

Hans Jakob Christoffel von Grimmelshausen used the occupation of Hanau by the Swedish as background in his picaresque novel Simplicius Simplicissimus.

=== Return from exile ===
From September 1635 to June 1636, Hanau was unsuccessfully besieged by imperial troops under General Guillaume de Lamboy. This siege proved the value of the modern defensive system, which had been constructed only a few years before. Thousands of refugees fled from the surrounding villages into the city. After a nine-month siege, the city was relieved by an army under Landgrave Wilhelm V of Hesse-Kassel. He was Philipp Moritz's brother-in-law, as he had married Philipp Moritz's sister, Amalie Elisabeth. A church service was held annually to commemorate the relief. After 1800, this developed into an annual Lamboy festival.

In 1637, Philipp Moritz reconciled with the new Emperor, Ferdinand III and changed sides again, back to the Catholic side. He returned to Hanau on 17 December 1637. General Ramsay ignored this and interned Philipp Moritz in the City Castle. He was obviously hoping to receive Hanau as a fief.

However, on 11 February [O.S. 2 February] 1638, Johann Winter von Güldenborn, a major in the Hanau army, supported by members of the Wetterau Association of Imperial Counts, staged a coup against the Swedes. He drove them out of Hanau and restored Philipp Moritz to power. General Ramsay was arrested and taken to Dillenburg, where he died months later from injuries he sustained during this action.

== Trivium ==
Philipp Moritz was a member of the Fruitbearing Society, under the nickname der Faselnde.

== Death ==
Philipp Moritz died on 3 August 1638 and was buried in the family crypt his father had established in the Church of St. Mary in Hanau.

== Marriage and issue ==
Philipp Moritz returned to Hanau in 1626 and married Princess Sibylle Christine of Anhalt-Dessau. They had the following children:

1. Sibylle Mauritania (2 November 1630 – 24 March 1631). She was buried in the family vault in the St. Mary's Church in Hanau. The remains were reburied in 1879 in a new coffin, as the old one had rotted.
2. Adolphine (31 October 1631 – 22 December 1631). Baptized on 4 December 1631. Her Godfather was King Gustaf II Adolf of Sweden, with Count Reinhard of Solms acting on his behalf.
3. Philipp Ludwig III (26 November 1632 – 12 November 1641), who succeeded his father as ruler of the county of Hanau-Münzenberg.
4. Johann Heinrich (3 May 1634 – 28 October 1634 in Metz). Johann Heinrich died while his relatives had fled from Hanau to the Netherlands. Because of the war, he was initially buried in Zweibrücken in 1635. His mother had his body transported to Hanau as soon as it was possible again, and on 30 November 1638, he was buried in a metal coffin in the family vault in the Church of St. Mary in Hanau.
5. Louise Eleanor Belgica (born: 3 March 1636 in Metz; died later that year in the Hague, where she was buried).

== Ancestors ==
Ancestors of Philipp Moritz, Count of Hanau-Münzenberg

8. Philipp III, Count of Hanau-Münzenberg (1526–1561)
4. Philipp Ludwig I, Count of Hanau-Münzenberg (1553–1580)
9. Countess Palatine Helena of Simmern
2. Philipp Ludwig II, Count of Hanau-Münzenberg (1576–1612)
10. Philipp IV, Count of Waldeck (1493–1574)
5. Magdalene of Waldeck-Wildungen (1558–1599)
11. Jutta of Isenburg (d. 1564)
1. Philipp Moritz, Count of Hanau-Münzenberg
12. William I, Count of Nassau-Siegen (1487-1559)
6. William the Silent (1533–1584)
13. Juliana of Stolberg (1506–1580)
3. Countess Catharina Belgica of Nassau (1578–1648)
14. Louis, Duke of Montpensier (1513-1582)
7. Charlotte of Bourbon (1546–1582)
15. Jacqueline de Longwy (1538–1561)

== Footnotes ==
Philipp Moritz, Count of Hanau-Münzenberg House of Hanau Born: 25 August 1605 Died: 3 August 1638
Preceded by Philipp Ludwig II	Count of Hanau-Münzenberg; 1612–1638	Succeeded by Philipp Ludwig III
