= Schwarzenfels =

German village in Hesse

Coordinates: 50°18′N 9°40′E

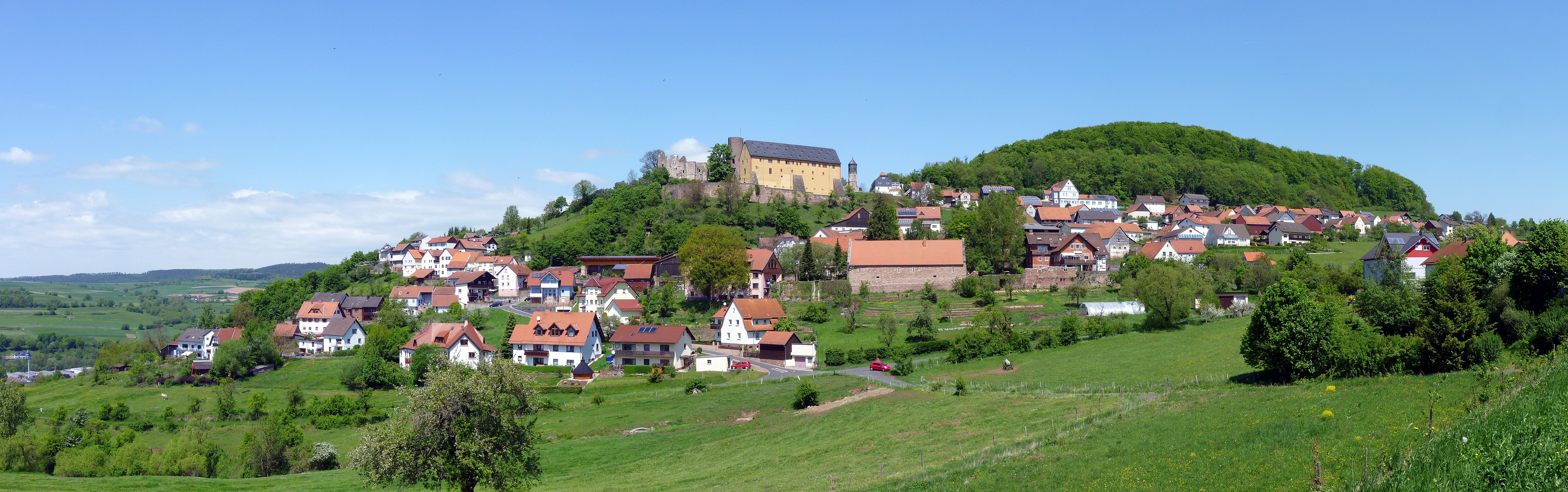

Schwarzenfels is a village in the German municipality of Sinntal in Main-Kinzig-Kreis in the state of Hesse.

The population in 2009 was 577.
