= Philipp Ludwig II of Hanau-Münzenberg =

Count of Hanau-Münzenberg

Philipp Ludwig II, Count of Hanau-Münzenberg
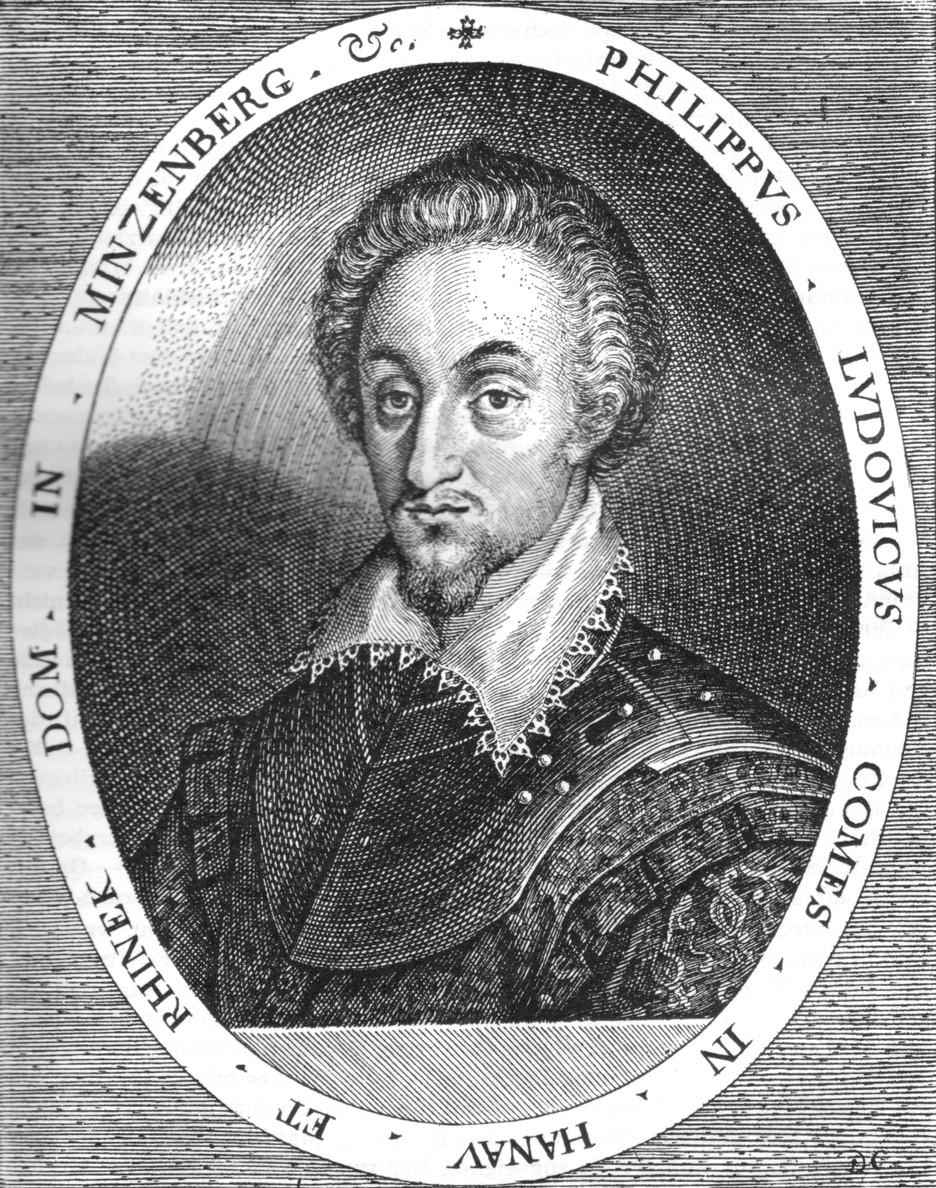
- Philipp Ludwig II by Dominicus Custos
- Born: 18 November 1576; Hanau, County of Hanau-Münzenberg, Holy Roman Empire
- Died: 9 August 1612 (aged 35); Hanau, County of Hanau-Münzenberg, Holy Roman Empire
- Noble family: Hanau
- Spouse: Catharina Belgica
- Issue Detail: Amalia Elisabeth; Philipp Moritz
- Father: Philipp Ludwig I, Count of Hanau-Münzenberg
- Mother: Magdalene of Waldeck-Wildungen

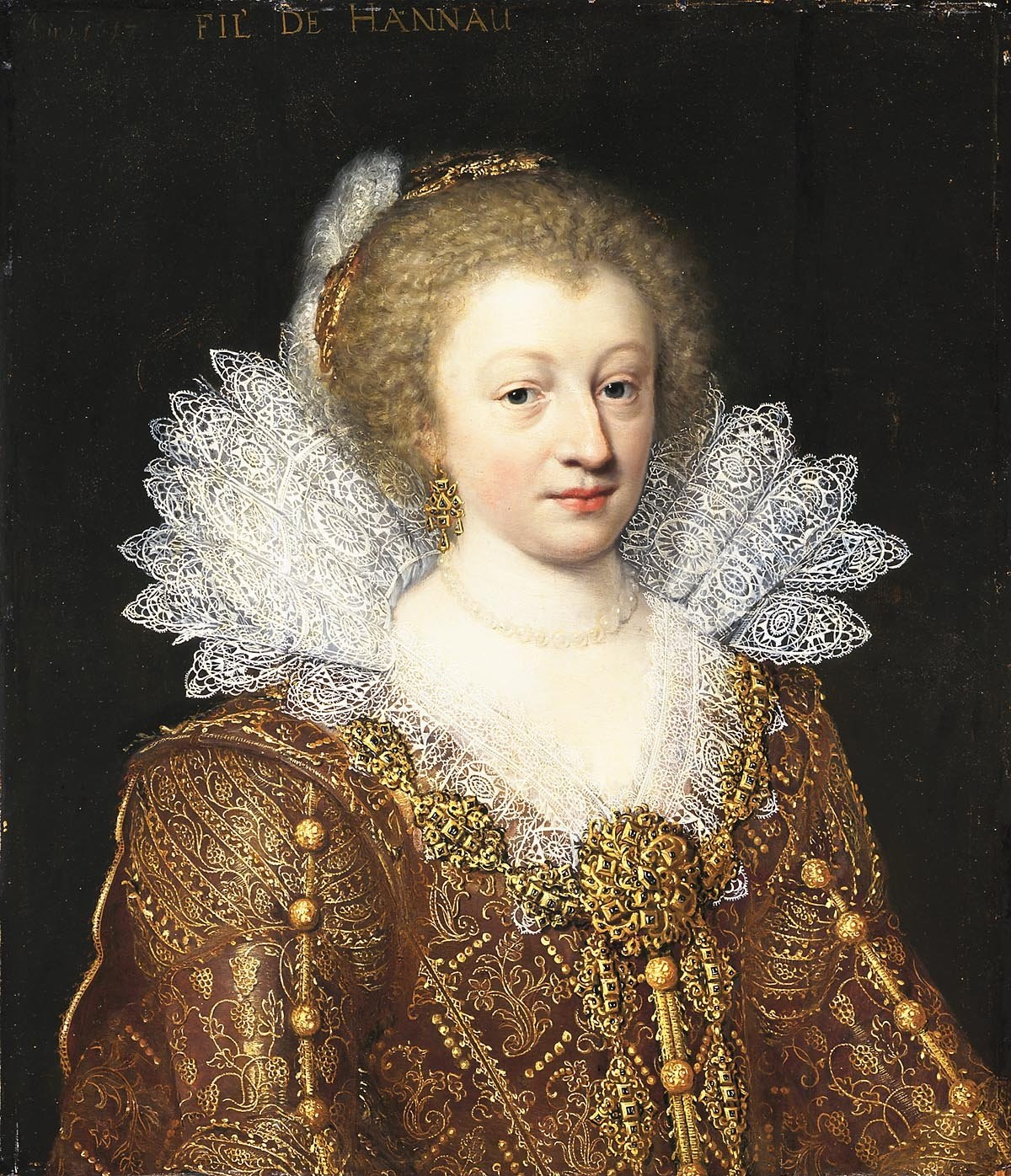
Catharina Belgica in 1617 by Jan Antonisz van Ravesteyn

Philipp Ludwig II of Hanau-Münzenberg (18 November 1576, in Hanau – 9 August 1612, in Hanau), was one of the most notable counts of Hanau of the early modern period, his policies bringing about sweeping changes.

Count Philipp Ludwig II of Hanau-Münzenberg was born in the castle at Hanau and baptised two weeks later on 3 December. His parents were Count Philipp Ludwig I of Hanau-Münzenberg (1553–1580) and Countess Magdalene of Waldeck-Wildungen (1558–1599).

== Guardianship ==
He nominally succeeded his deceased father on 4 February 1580, albeit under the guardianship of Counts John VI, Count of Nassau-Dillenburg (1536–1606), Louis I, Count of Sayn-Wittgenstein (1568–1607) and Philipp IV, Count of Hanau-Lichtenberg (1514–1590), who was replaced in 1585 by his son, Count Philipp V of Hanau-Lichtenberg (1541–1599).

His widowed mother, Magdalena, remarried on 9 December 1581 to Count John VII, the Middle, of Nassau-Siegen (1561–1623), the son of one of the guardians. In consequence Philipp Ludwig II and his younger brother, Count Albrecht, joined the Nassau-Dillenburg court, a centre of the Reformation movement in Germany and closely tied to the Electorate of the Palatinate of the Rhine. The new ideas he encountered here greatly influenced his life.

The guardianship was ended only in 1608 at the behest of the Elector Palatine Friedrich IV (1574–1610).

== Family ==
During a wedding feast in Dillenburg that lasted from 23 October 1596 - 3 November 1596, he married Katharina Belgica, third daughter of William the Silent, producing the following children:

1. Charlotte Louise (1597–1649 Kassel), not married
2. Daughter (29 July 1598 – 9 August 1598), died unbaptised
3. Philipp Ulrich (2 January 1601 – 7 April 1604 Steinau)
4. Amalia Elisabeth (1602–1651 Kassel), married to Wilhelm V, Landgrave of Hesse-Kassel
5. Katharina Juliane (1604–1668 Hanau), married first on 11 September 1631 to Count Albrecht Otto II of Solms-Laubach, Rödelheim and Assenheim and secondly on 31 March 1642 to Moritz Christian of Wied-Runkel
6. Philipp Moritz (1605–1638), who succeeded him, buried in the Marienkirche in Hanau
7. Wilhelm Reinhard (1607–1630 Aachen), buried in the Marienkirche in Hanau
8. Heinrich Ludwig (1609–1632) died during the Siege of Maastricht
9. Friedrich Ludwig (27 July 1610 – 4 October 1628 Paris), buried in the family tomb of the Duke of Bouillon in Sedan
10. Jakob Johann (1612–1636 Zabern), buried in St. Nikolaus in Strasbourg

== Policies ==
Count Philipp Ludwig II's policies are notable for their drive of modernisation for his tiny state. With his marriage, he came of age, although the regency continued for his younger brother Albrecht. By using his rights under the Cuius regio, eius religio rule, he changed the confession of his county to Calvinism. He succeeded with this nearly everywhere in his sphere of influence, except in a few villages in the district Bornheimerberg, which surrounded Frankfurt and the condominiums shared with the Roman Catholic archbishop-elector of Mainz. The villages in the vicinity of Frankfurt had strong ties to this (mainly) Lutheran city and a majority of the villagers just went to Lutheran services in “foreign” Frankfurt territory. Also in the condominiums Philipp Ludwig II shared with the Archbishopric of Mainz he couldn’t change anything — whether they had become Lutheran during the reformation or had remained Roman Catholic.

The introduction of Calvinism and its location, at only half a day's journey away from Frankfurt with its trade fair, made Hanau an attractive place to settle for Calvinist refugees from France and later from the Southern Netherlands. They were often wealthy traders and were attractive subjects for a ruler in need of tax revenues. In 1597 and 1604, the count and the refugees entered into two treaties which gave them a large degree of self-government and founded the “New Town” of Hanau, south to the historic mediaeval settlement. This proved to be a big success and initiated an economic growth for Hanau which lasted even into the 19th century.

Philipp Ludwig II also reinstated a Jewish community in Hanau. Space was allocated for the Jews on the southern fortifications of the historic town, which was no longer needed, due to the new town which protected this side of the old town. This Ghetto was not part of one either town, but placed directly under the administrative control of the county.

Count Philipp Ludwig II also tried to found a university. He founded the “Hohe Landesschule” in Hanau. It was modeled on the Herborn Academy, where he had studied himself. Although it did not develop into a university, it still exists today as a secondary school.

== Ancestors ==
Ancestors of Philipp Ludwig II of Hanau-Münzenberg

8. Philipp II, Count of Hanau-Münzenberg (1501–1552)
4. Philipp III, Count of Hanau-Münzenberg (1526–1561)
9. Juliana of Stolberg (1506–1580)
2. Philipp Ludwig I, Count of Hanau-Münzenberg (1553–1580)
10. Johann II, Count Palatine of Simmern (1509–1557)
5. Countess Palatine Helena of Simmern (1533–1579)
11. Beatrice of Baden (1492–1535)
1. Philipp Ludwig II, Count of Hanau-Münzenberg
12. Henry VIII, Count of Waldeck-Wildungen (1465–1513)
6. Philipp IV, Count of Waldeck (1493–1574)
13. Anastasia of Runkel (1477–1503)
3. Magdalene of Waldeck-Wildungen (1558–1591)
14. Salentin VII of Lower Isenburg (1492–1534)
7. Jutta of Isenburg (d. 1564)
15. Elisabeth of Hunolstein (d, 1538)

Philipp Ludwig II of Hanau-Münzenberg House of Hanau Born: 18 November 1576 Died: 9 August 1612
Preceded by Philipp Ludwig I	Count of Hanau-Münzenberg; 1580–1612	Succeeded by Philipp Moritz
