= Philipp V of Hanau-Lichtenberg =

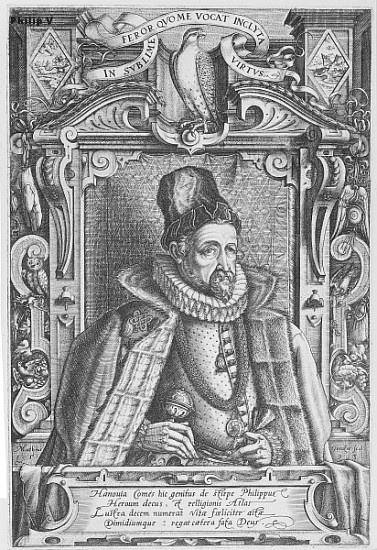
- Born: 21 February 1541; Bouxwiller
- Died: 2 June 1599 (aged 58); Niederbronn
- Buried: Lichtenberg
- Noble family: House of Hanau
- Spouses: Ludowika Margaretha of Zweibrücken-Bitsch; Katharina of Wied; Agathe of Limpurg-Obersontheim
- Father: Philipp IV, Count of Hanau-Lichtenberg
- Mother: Eleonore of Fürstenberg

Philipp V of Hanau-Lichtenberg (21 February 1541, in Bouxwiller – 2 June 1599, in Niederbronn) was Count of Hanau-Lichtenberg from 1590 until his death.

== Life ==
Philipp V was the eldest son, heir and successor of Count Philipp IV of Hanau-Lichtenberg (1514–1590) and the Countess Eleonore of Fürstenberg (1523–1544).

Philipp V was baptized in Bouxwiller on the day he was born. On 18 June 1553 he enrolled at the University of Tübingen, where he focussed on mathematics and astronomy. It was said that for a long time the Hanau family possessed a silver "terrestrial and celestial sphere" that Philipp had manufactured himself.

In his last years, Philipp V was sick. He died in 1599 during a visit to the spa in Bad Niederbronn. He was buried in Lichtenberg.

== Government ==
=== Inheritance of Zweibrücken-Bitsch ===
In 1570, Philipp's father-in-law, Count Palatine Jakob of Zweibrücken-Bitsch (1510–1570), died without male heir and Philipp's first wife, Countess Ludowika Margaretha inherited the County of Bitsch, the Lordship of Ochsenstein and half the Lordship of Lichtenberg (his father already held the other half). Jakob's older brother, Simon V Wecker, had already died in 1540, also without a male heir. A dispute about the inheritance erupted between the husbands of Ludowika Margaretha and her cousin Amalie, Philipp V of Hanau-Lichtenberg and Philipp I of Leiningen-Westerburg, respectively. Formally, the County of Bitsch and he district of Lemberg were fiefs of the Duchy of Lorraine and such fiefs could only be inherited in the male line.

Philipp V was initially successful in the dispute with Philipp I about Zweibrücken-Bitsch. However, he immediately introduced the Lutheran confession in his newly gained territories. This made the powerful and Catholic Duke of Lorraine unhappy. The Duke terminated the fief and in July 1572 Lorraine troops occupied the county. Since Philipp V's army was no match for Lorraine, he took his case to the Reichskammergericht. During the trial, Lorraine argued that, firstly, a significant part of the territory of Zweibrücken-Bitsch had been obtained in an exchange with Lorraine in 1302 and, secondly, the Counts of Leiningen had sold their hereditary claims to Lorraine in 1573. In 1604, Hanau-Lichtenberg and Lorraine decided to settle out of court. In a treaty signed in 1606, it was agreed that Bitsch would revert to Lorraine and Hanau-Lichtenberg would retain Lemberg. This was reasonable, as it corresponded approximately to the religious realities of the territories.

=== Ascent to the throne ===
Because of his advanced age, Philipp IV delegated successively larger parts of the government business to Philipp V during the final years of his life. After Philipp IV died in 1590, Philipp V took up rule in his own name. As early as 1579, Philipp V introduced the Statutes of Solms in the district of Babenhausen, "on the advice" of his father. This was part of a program to have the same statute law in all territories rules by members of the Wetterau Association of Imperial Counts. In 1585, he took over from his father the guardianship of Philipp Ludwig II and Albrecht, the underage sons of Philipp Ludwig I of Hanau-Münzenberg, who had died in 1580.

=== Guardianship in Hanau-Münzenberg ===
The other guardian in Hanau-Münzenberg, beside Philipp V, were Count Johann VI "the Elder" of Nassau-Dillenburg and Count Ludwig I of Sayn-Wittgenstein. With respect to Albrecht, who reached adulthood in 1608, there were considerable religious disputes between the parties — Hanau-Lichtenberg was Lutheran, Hanau-Münzenberg was Calvinist — and the guardianship could only be finalized in 1608.

Philipp V tried to have the Lutheran Count Palatine Richard of Simmern-Sponheim appointed as an extra guardian. This attempt failed, despite a ruling in his favour by the Reichskammergericht. The Calvinist majority of the guardians prevented the population of Hanau-Münzenberg from paying homage to Richard. The majority then had the Electoral Administrator Count Palatine Johann Casimir of Simmern appointed as "upper guardian" — a purely honorary position — thereby strengthening the Calvinist majority among the guardians. In this conflict, Philipp V eventually succumbed.

=== Domestic policies ===
In 1588, he built the first mint in his county in Wörth an der Sauer; this was probably induced by the excellent economic situation in the county during his reign.

Witch hunts were widespread in this period. Philipp V issued a proclamation on the subject, but did not involve himself any further. This led to fewer executions than in other territories. Even so, there was at least one execution, in Schaafheim.

== Marriage and issue ==
Philipp V married three times:

1. 14 October 1560 in Bitsch with Countess Palatine Ludowika Margaretha of Zweibrücken-Bitsch (born: 19 July 1540 in Ingwiller; died: 15 December 1569 in Bouxwiller). She was the only child of Count Jakob of Zweibrücken-Bitsch (born: 19 July 1510; died: 22 March 1570) and was his heiress. She was buried in Ingweiler. With her, Philipp V had the following children:
  1. Johanna Sybille (born: 6 July 1564 in Lichtenberg; died on 24 March 1636 Runkel), married to Count Wilhelm V of Wied-Runkel and Isenburg (died: 1612)
  2. Philipp (born: 7 October 1565 in Bouxwiller; died: 31 August 1572 in Strasbourg; buried in Neuwiller-lès-Saverne)
  3. Albrecht (born: 22 November 1566 in Bouxwiller; died: 13 February 1577 in Haguenau; buried in Neuwiller)
  4. Katharina (born: 30 January 1568 in Bouxwiller; died 6 August 1636), married Schenk Eberhard of Limpurg-Speckfeld (1560–1622)
  5. Johann Reinhard I (born: 13 February 1569 in Bitsch, died: 19 November 1625 in Lichtenberg)
2. On 18 February 1572 in Bitsch Countess Katharina of Wied (born: 27 May 1552; died: 13 November 1584 in Lichfield). She was buried in Ingweiler. With her, Philipp V had the following children:
  1. Juliane (born: 6 March 1573 in Babenhausen; died on 8 April 1582 in Bouxwiller; buried in Neuwiller)
  2. Eleanor (born: 13 June 1576; died young)
  3. Philipp (born: 21 July 1579 in Babenhausen; died 23 February 1580 in Bouxwiller; buried in Neuwiller)
  4. Amalie (born: 14 March 1582 in Bouxwiller; died: 11 July 1627;) buried in Lichtenberg
3. On 20 June 1586 in Bouxwiller with Schenkess Agathe of Limpurg-Obersontheim (born: 17 November 1561; died: 1623; buried in Lichtenberg), daughter of Schenk Friedrich VII, Lord of Limpurg-Obersontheim (born: 6 August 1536; died: 29 January 1596). She married after 1605 in her second marriage to Count Rudolf of Sulz, Landgrave in Klettgau (born: 13 February 1559; died: 5 May 1620), who had previously married Barbara of Staufen. Philipp V and Agathe had the following children:
  1. Agathe (born: 17 June 1587; died after 1605)
  2. Reinhard (born: 21 January 1589; died 7 February 1589; buried in Neuweiler)
  3. Anna Margarethe (born: after 1590; died shortly after birth). She was once assumed to be identical with Agathe, this assumption is contradicted by a contemporary document in the Hessian State Archives, Marburg, which lists all members of the family.

== Ancestors ==
Ancestors of Philipp V of Hanau-Lichtenberg

8. Philipp II, Count of Hanau-Lichtenberg (1462–1504)
4. Philipp III, Count of Hanau-Lichtenberg (1482–1533)
9. Anna of Isenburg-Büdingen (d. 1522)
2. Philipp IV, Count of Hanau-Lichtenberg (1514–159)
10. Christoph I, Margrave of Baden-Baden (1453–1527)
5. Sibylle of Baden (1485–1518)
11. Ottilie of Katzenelnbogen (1453–1517)
1. Philipp V of Hanau-Lichtenberg
12. Wolfgang of Fürstenberg (1465–1509)
6. Friedrich II of Fürstenberg (1496–1559)
13. Elisabeth of Solms-Braunfels (1469–1514)
3. Eleonore of Fürstenberg (1523–1544)
14. Christoph of Werdenberg (d. 1534)
7. Anna of Werdenberg (d. 1554)
15. Eleonora Gonzaga of Mantua (d. 1512)

== Footnotes ==
Philipp V of Hanau-Lichtenberg House of Hanau Born: 21 February 1541 Died: 2 June 1599
Preceded by Philipp IV	Count of Hanau-Lichtenberg; 1590–1599	Succeeded by Johann Reinhard I
