= Johann Reinhard I of Hanau-Lichtenberg =

Johann Reinhard I, Count of Hanau-Lichtenberg
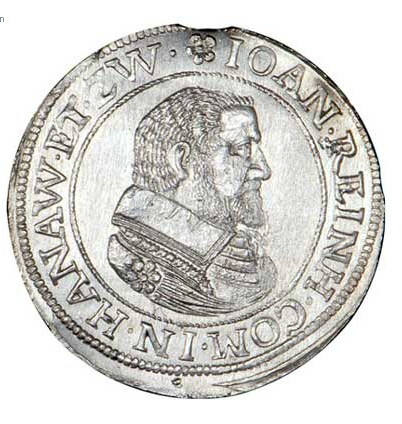
- Silver coin of Johann Reinhard I of Hanau-Lichtenberg
- Born: 13 February 1569; Bitche
- Died: 19 November 1625 (aged 56); Lichtenberg
- Noble family: House of Hanau
- Spouse: Maria Elisabeth of Hohenlohe-Neuenstein
- Father: Philipp V, Count of Hanau-Lichtenberg
- Mother: Countess Ludowika Margaretha of Zweibrücken-Bitsch

Count Johann Reinhard I of Hanau-Lichtenberg (13 February 1569, Bitche (German: Bitsch) – 19 November 1625 Lichtenberg) ruled the county of Hanau-Lichtenberg from 1599 to 1625.

== Life ==
Johann Reinhard I, was the son of Philipp V, Count of Hanau-Lichtenberg (1541–1599) and his first wife, Countess Ludowika Margaretha of Zweibrücken-Bitsch (1540–1569). Johann Reinhard I was christened on 28 February 1569 in Bitche.

Johann Reinhard I studied at the University of Strasbourg and completed a Grand Tour of France, Italy, the Netherlands and England. After his marriage, he was assigned Babenhausen Castle as a residence. He had the nave of the local St. Nikolaus Church embellished and painted. He was interested in history, genealogy and heraldry.

Johann Reinhard I died on 19 November 1625 in Lichtenberg in the Alsace and was also buried there.

== Government ==
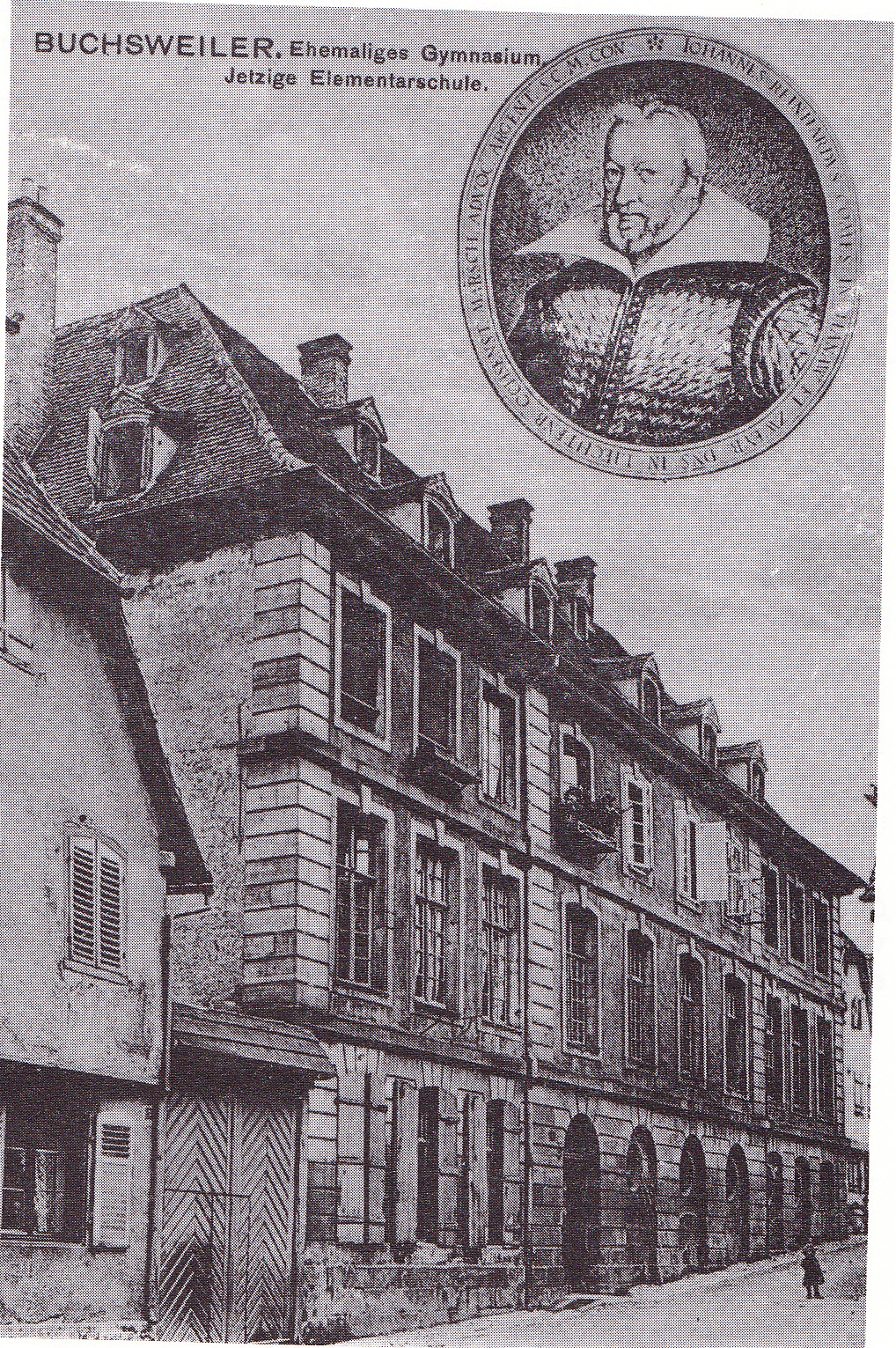
Postcard from Bouxwiller showing the Latin School and a portrait of Johann Reinhard

The counts of Hanau had had a court case before the Reichskammergericht against the Dukes of Lorraine since 1572 about the inheritance of Zweibrücken-Bitsch. In 1606, they settled out of court. At issue were two fiefs in Lorraine: Bitche and Lemberg Castle. A compromise was found: Bitche reverted to Lorraine, and Hanau-Lichtenberg was allowed to keep Lemberg Castle. This made sense, as it corresponded roughly to the religious realities in the territories. Johann Reinhard also settled a case against the County of Isenburg about conflicting rights in the Dreieich area.

He established a Protestant Latin school in his capital of Bouxwiller (German: Buchsweiler), which existed until 1792. It was a counterpart to the Hohe Landesschule in Hanau-Münzenberg. In 1613, a school regulation for the county was issued. Also in 1613, construction started of the new City Church in Bouxwiller.

In 1610, Johann Reinhard I concluded a treaty of inheritance with Count Philipp Ludwig II of Hanau-Münzenberg, stipulating that if one of the ruling family branches were to die out, the other branch would inherit their county. This treaty was updated in 1618 and confirmed by the Emperor. At the time, it appeared that Hanau-Münzenberg was likely to benefit from this treaty, as it had several male family members, whereas Hanau-Lichtenberg had only one male heir. This might explain why Johann Reinhard I received some generous loans after the treaty was signed. He needed a lot of money, because he maintained an extensive court. Contrary to expectations, the Hanau-Münzenberg branch of the family died out in 1642 and Johann Reinhard's grandson Friedrich Casimir inherited the county of Hanau-Münzenberg.

Johann Reinhard I played a role in the coronation celebrations of Emperor Matthias 1612 and the election of Emperor Ferdinand in 1619.

The county of Hanau-Lichtenberg suffered badly during the Thirty Years' War. Count Johann Reinhard I tried to maintain a strict neutrality, but the county's location near the Electorate of the Palatinate, the highways along the Rhine valley and the French-German border area made that very difficult. The district of Babenhausen was the hardest hit. It was occupied several times by the warring armies and its villages were destroyed in the first years of the war. The inhabitants fled. Some 2500 of them fled to the City of Babenhausen. The plague then broke out in the city. The parts of the county on the right bank of the Upper Rhine were also seriously damaged. The part of the county in the Lower Alsace was spared when Johann Reinhard I managed to buy protection for 100000florins.

Count Johann Reinhard I operated a "hedge mint" in Willstätt: a mint which brought debased coins into circulation. He earned substantial profits with this scam. In the financial year 1621–1622 alone he minted 110 cwt of silver coins and syphoned off more than 70000florins as "seignorage".

== Marriage and issue ==
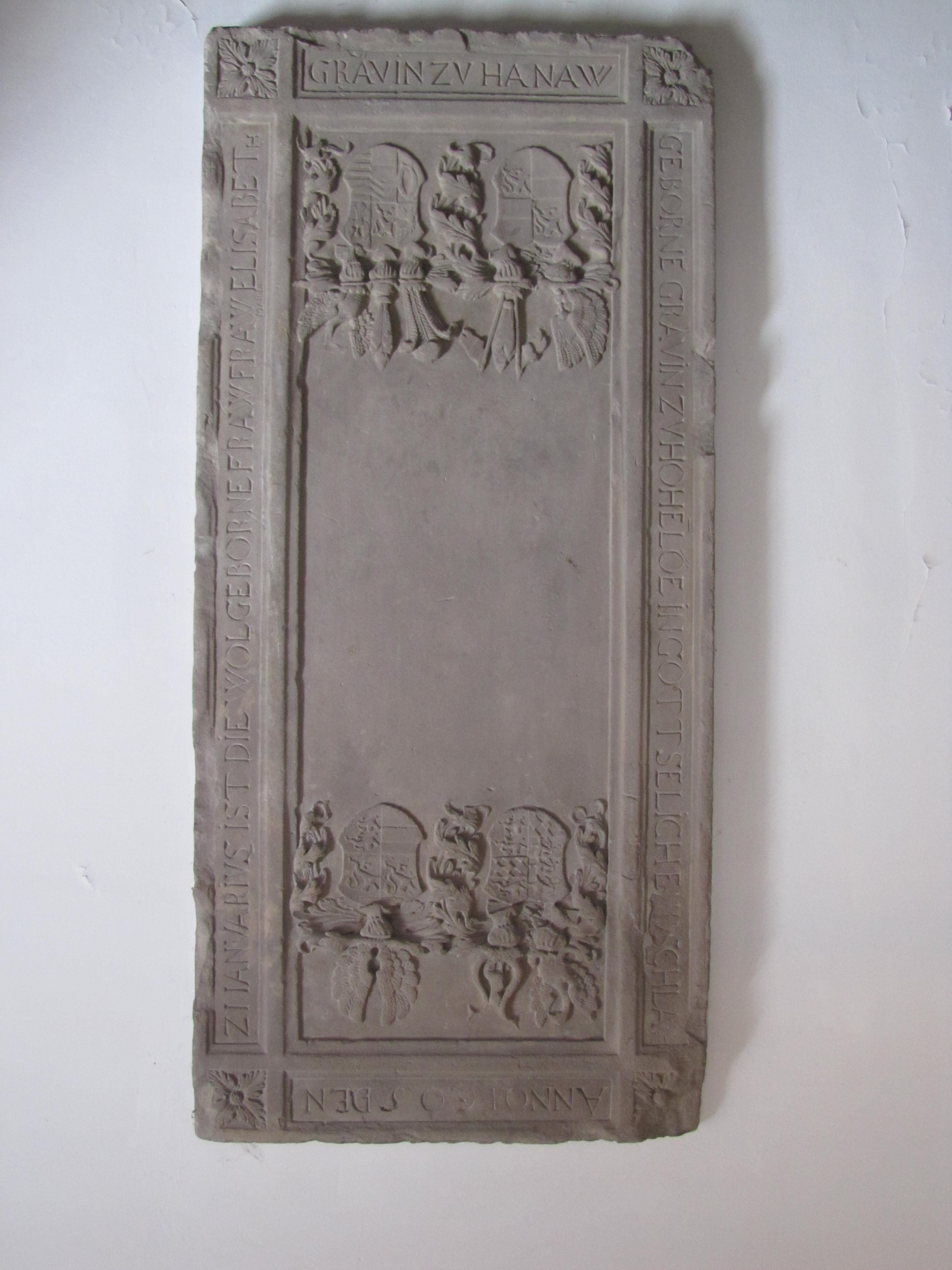
Tombstone of the Countess Maria Elisabeth of Hohenlohe, the wife of Count Johann Reinhard I, in the old city church of Bouxwiller

Johann Reinhard I married on 22 October 1593 in Weikersheim Countess Maria Elisabeth of Hohenlohe-Neuenstein (born: 12 June 1576, died: 21 January 1605 in Wœrth. She was the daughter of Count Wolfgang of Hohenlohe-Weikersheim (born: 14 June 1546; died: 28 March 1610) and Countess Magdalena of Nassau-Dillenburg (born: 15 December 1547; died: 16 May 1643), a daughter of William I, Count of Nassau-Siegen and Juliana of Stolberg. Maria Elisabeth was the last member of the family to be buried in the old city church of Bouxwiller.

They had four children:

1. Philipp Wolfgang (born: 31 July 1595 in Bouxwiller (German: Buchsweiler; died: 24 February [O.S. 4 February] 1641 in Bouxwiller).
2. Agatha Marie (August 22, 1599 in Bouxwiller; † May 23, 1636 in Baden), married Georg Friedrich of Rappoltstein (1593–1651).
3. Anna Magdalena (born: 14 December 1600 in Bouxwiller; died: 22 February 1673), married several times.
4. Elisabeth Juliana (born: 29 June 1602 in Bouxwiller; died: 21 April 1603 in Wörth am Rhein, also buried there)

After the death of his first wife, Johann Reinhard I married on 17 November 1605 with Wild- and Rhinegravine Anna of Salm-Neuweiler (born: 14 March 1582; died: 1636), daughter of Wild- and Rhinegrave Friedrich I of Salm-Neuweiler (born: 3 February 1547; died: 26 October 1608). This marriage remained childless. She was buried in Schwarzach Abbey.

== Ancestors ==
Ancestors of Johann Reinhard I of Hanau-Lichtenberg

8. Philipp III, Count of Hanau-Lichtenberg (1482–1538)
4. Philipp IV, Count of Hanau-Lichtenberg (1514–1590)
9. Sibylle of Baden (1482–1538)
2. Philipp V, Count of Hanau-Lichtenberg (1541–1599)
10. Friedrich II of Fürstenberg (1496–1559)
5. Eleonore of Fürstenberg (1523–1544)
11. Anna of Werdenberg (d. 1554)
1. Johann Reinhard I, Count of Hanau-Lichtenberg
12. Reinhard of Zweibrücken-Bitsch (d. 1532)
6. Jakob of Zweibrücken-Bitsch (1510–1570)
13. Anna of Salm (d.1541)
3. Countess Ludowika Margaretha of Zweibrücken-Bitsch (1523–1544)
14. Ernst V of Honstein (d. 1552)
7. Katharina of Honstein (d. 1570)
15. Anna of Bentheim

== Footnotes ==
Johann Reinhard I of Hanau-Lichtenberg House of Hanau Born: 13 February 1569 Died: 19 November 1625
Preceded by Philipp V	Count of Hanau-Lichtenberg; 1599–1625	Succeeded by Philipp Wolfgang
