= Katharina of Hanau-Lichtenberg =

- Born: 30 January 1568; Buchweiller (now Bouxwiller)
- Died: 6 August 1636 (aged 68)
- Noble family: House of Hanau
- Spouse: Schenk Eberhard of Limpurg-Speckfeld
- Father: Philipp V, Count of Hanau-Lichtenberg
- Mother: Ludowika Margaretha of Zweibrücken-Bitsch

Katharina of Hanau-Lichtenberg (30 January 1568 in Buchweiller (now Bouxwiller) – 6 August 1636) was a daughter of Count Philipp V and his wife, Countess Ludowika Margaretha of Zweibrücken-Bitsch (1540–1569).

== Marriage and issue ==
Katharina married Schenk Eberhard of Limpurg-Speckfeld (3 October 1560 – 26 February 1622) and had at least two sons:

- Ludwig Philipp (1588–1627)
- Georg Friedrich (1596–1651), married Countess Magdalena Elisabeth of Hanau-Münzenberg-Schwarzenfels

== Ancestors ==
Ancestors of Katharina of Hanau-Lichtenberg

8. Philipp III, Count of Hanau-Lichtenberg (1482–1538)
4. Philipp IV, Count of Hanau-Lichtenberg (1514–1590)
9. Sibylle of Baden (1482–1538)
2. Philipp V, Count of Hanau-Lichtenberg (1541–1599)
10. Friedrich II of Fürstenberg (1496–1559)
5. Eleonore of Fürstenberg (1523–1544)
11. Anna of Werdenberg (d. 1554)
1. Katharina of Hanau-Lichtenberg
12. Reinhard of Zweibrücken-Bitsch (d. 1532)
6. Jakob of Zweibrücken-Bitsch (1510–1570)
13. Anna of Salm (d.1541)
3. Countess Ludowika Margaretha of Zweibrücken-Bitsch (1523–1544)
14. Ernst V of Honstein (d. 1552)
7. Katharina of Honstein (d. 1570)
15. Anna of Bentheim
