= Agatha Marie of Hanau =

- Born: 22 August 1599; Buchsweiler
- Died: 23 May 1636 (aged 36); Baden-Baden
- Buried: Rappoltsweiler
- Noble family: House of Hanau
- Spouse: George Frederick of Rappoltstein
- Father: Johann Reinhard I, Count of Hanau-Lichtenberg
- Mother: Maria Elisabeth of Hohenlohe-Neuenstein

Countess Agatha Marie of Hanau-Lichtenberg (22 August 1599 – 23 May 1636) was a daughter of Count Johann Reinhard I (1569-1625) and his wife, Countess Maria Elisabeth of Hohenlohe-Neuenstein (1576-1605).

Agatha Marie was born in Buchsweiler (now Bouxwiller). She died on 23 May 1636 in the city of Baden (now called Baden-Baden) and was buried in Rappoltsweiler (now called Ribeauvillé).

== Marriage and issue ==
She married on 20 November [O.S. 10 November] 1623 to George Frederick of Rappoltstein (14 July 1593 – 30 August [O.S. 20 August] 1651 in Strasbourg). He was a son of Eberhard of Rappoltstein (12 March 1570 – 17 August 1637 in Strasbourg) and the Wild- and Rhinegravine Anna of Kyrburg-Mörchingen (1572 – 25 August 1608). After Agatha Marie's death, George Frederick would remarry in 1640 to Countess Elisabeth Charlotte of Solms-Sonnewalde.

From her marriage Agatha Marie had two children:

- Stillborn son (18 September [O.S. 8 September] 1626).
- Agatha Fredericka (23 July [O.S. 13 July] 1627 – 16 September [O.S. 6 September] 1627).

== Ancestors ==
Ancestors of Agatha Marie of Hanau

8. Philip IV, Count of Hanau-Lichtenberg (1514-1590)
4. Philip V, Count of Hanau-Lichtenberg (1541-1599)
9. Eleonore of Fürstenberg (1523-1544)
2. Johann Reinhard I, Count of Hanau-Lichtenberg (1569-1625)
10. James of Zweibrücken-Bitsch (1510-1570)
5. Countess Ludowika Margaretha of Zweibrücken-Bitsch (1540-1569)
11. Catherine of Honstein (d. 1570)
1. Agatha Marie of Hanau-Lichtenberg
12. Louis Casimir of Hohenlohe-Neuenstein-Langenburg (1517-1568)
6. Wolfgang of Hohenlohe-Neuenstein-Weikersheim (1546-1610)
13. Anna of Solms-Laubach(1522-1594)
3. Maria Elisabeth of Hohenlohe-Neuenstein-Weikersheim (1576-1605)
14. William I, Count of Nassau-Siegen (1487-1559)
7. Magdalene of Nassau-Dillenburg (1547-1633)
15. Juliana of Stolberg (1506-1580)
