= Anna Magdalena of Hanau-Lichtenberg =

Anna Magdalene of Hanau-Lichtenberg
- Born: 14 December 1600; Bouxwiller
- Died: 22 February 1673 (aged 72)
- Noble family: House of Hanau
- Spouses: Lothar of Criechingen; Otto Louis of Salm-Kyrburg-Mörchingen; Frederick Rudolph of Fürstenberg-Stühlingen
- Father: Johann Reinhard I, Count of Hanau-Lichtenberg
- Mother: Maria Elisabeth of Hohenlohe-Neuenstein-Weikersheim

Countess Anna Magdalena von Hanau-Lichtenberg (14 December 1600 – 22 February 1673) was a daughter of Count Johann Reinhard I of Hanau-Lichtenberg (1569–1625) and Countess Maria Elisabeth of Hohenlohe-Neuenstein-Weikersheim (1576–1605).

== Marriage and issue ==
Anna Magdalena married three times.

On 27 November 1625, Anna Magdalena married Lothar of Criechingen (d. 1629), the son of Christopher of Criechingen-Pittingen, bailiff of German-Lorraine (d. 1622/1623) and Anna Bayer of Boppard. Lothar and Anna Magdalene had a son,

- Count Francis Ernest III of Criechingen (1627 - 1677).

In August 1633, Anna Magdalena married Wild- and Rhinegrave Otto Louis of Salm-Kyrburg-Mörchingen (13 October 1597 – 16 October 1634. He was a general in the Swedish army and a governor the Alsace. Otto Louis died in Speyer from the plague buried in Strasbourg Cathedral). They had a son who was born posthumously,

- Wild- and Rhinegrave John XI of Salm-Kyrburg-Mörchingen (17 April 1635 – 16 November 1688 in Flonheim. He died in Flonheim and is buried in the parish church of Kirn).

On 8 April 1636, Anna Magdalena married Count Frederick Rudolph of Fürstenberg-Stühlingen (23 April 1602 – 26 October 1655). He was the son of Count Christopher II of Fürstenberg (1580 – 1614) and Baroness Dorothea of Sternberg (d. 12 June 1633). Frederick Rudolph was a member of the Aulic Council and the War Council. He was also High Feldzeugmeister, Major General and Master of the Horse. From 1639, he was Landgrave of Stühlingen and in 1642 the Emperor raised him from Freiherr to Imperial Count. His first marriage had been to Maria Maximiliana of Pappenheim (d. 16 October 1635). Anna Magdalene and Frederick Rudolph had 5 children, of which 4 died very young:

- Count Francis of Fürstenberg-Stühlingen (1636 - 1636),
- Count Ferdinand Anselm of Fürstenberg-Stühlingen (17 July 1637 – 1637),
- Countess Maria Franziska of Fürstenberg-Stühlingen (7 August 1638 – 24 August 1680), married in 1655 Herman Egon, Prince of Fürstenberg,
- Count Adam Leopold Louis of Fürstenberg-Stühlingen (6 May 1642 – 13 August 1643),
- Countess Catherine Elizabeth of Fürstenberg-Stühlingen (27 April 1643 – 1643).

== Ancestors ==
Ancestors of Anna Magdalena of Hanau-Lichtenberg

8. Philip IV, Count of Hanau-Lichtenberg (1514-1590)
4. Philip V, Count of Hanau-Lichtenberg (1541-1599)
9. Eleonore of Fürstenberg (1523-1544)
2. Johann Reinhard I, Count of Hanau-Lichtenberg (1569-1625)
10. James of Zweibrücken-Bitsch (1510-1570)
5. Countess Ludowika Margaretha of Zweibrücken-Bitsch (1540-1569)
11. Catherine of Honstein (d. 1570)
1. Anna Magdalene of Hanau-Lichtenberg
12. Louis Casimir of Hohenlohe-Neuenstein-Langenburg (1517-1568)
6. Wolfgang von Hohenlohe-Neuenstein-Weikersheim (1546-1610)
13. Anna of Solms-Laubach(1522-1594)
3. Maria Elisabeth of Hohenlohe-Neuenstein-Weikersheim (1576-1605)
14. William I, Count of Nassau-Siegen (1487-1559)
7. Magdalene von Nassau-Dillenburg (1547-1633)
15. Juliana of Stolberg (1506-1580)

== Sources ==
- Detlev Schwennicke: Europäische Stammtafeln: Stammtafeln zur Geschichte der Europäischen Staaten
- Reinhard Suchier: Genealogie des Hanauer Grafenhauses, in: Festschrift des Hanauer Geschichtsvereins zu seiner fünfzigjährigen Jubelfeier am 27. August 1894, Hanau, 1894
- Ernst J. Zimmermann: Hanau Stadt und Land, 3rd ed., Hanau, 1919, reprinted 1978
