= Johanna Sibylla of Hanau-Lichtenberg =

- Born: 6 July 1564; Château de Lichtenberg
- Died: 24 March 1636 (aged 71); Runkel
- Noble family: House of Hanau
- Spouse: Wilhelm IV of Wied-Runkel and Isenburg
- Father: Philipp V, Count of Hanau-Lichtenberg
- Mother: Ludowika Margaretha of Zweibrücken-Bitsch

Johanna Sibylla of Hanau-Lichtenberg (6 July 1564 at Château de Lichtenberg – 24 March 1636 in Runkel) was the first child of Philipp V, Count of Hanau-Lichtenberg from his first marriage with Countess Ludowika Margaretha of Zweibrücken-Bitsch (1540-1569).

== Life ==
On 1 February 1582, Johanna Sibylla married Count Wilhelm IV of Wied-Runkel and Isenburg (1560 – 13 September 1612), the son of Count Johann IV of Wied-Runkel and Isenburg (d. 15 June 1581) and Katharina of Hanau, Countess of Wied (1525-1581). William succeeded his father in 1581 as Count of Upper Wied (Runkel and Dierdorf) and in the rest of Wied in 1595.

== Issue ==
1. Juliana (d. 24 August 1635), married on 18 May 1634 to Count Ludwig IV of Löwenstein-Wertheim (1598-1657)
2. Elisabeth (24 August 1593 – 28 June 1635), married on 13 September 1614 to Count Philipp of Solms-Hohensolms-Lich
3. Katharina Philippina Walpurgis (d. 1647), married on 29 October 1611 in Schadeck to Count Christoph of Leiningen-Westerburg (d. 1635)
4. Maria Anna Magdalena, married in 1628 to Adolf of Wylich-Döringen
5. Aemilia
6. Johanetta

== Ancestors ==
Ancestors of Johanna Sibylla of Hanau-Lichtenberg

8. Philipp III, Count of Hanau-Lichtenberg (1482-1538)
4. Philipp IV, Count of Hanau-Lichtenberg (1514-1590)
9. Sibylle of Baden (1482-1538)
2. Philipp V, Count of Hanau-Lichtenberg (1541-1599)
10. Frederick II of Fürstenberg (1496-1559)
5. Eleonore of Fürstenberg (1523-1544)
11. Anna of Werdenberg (d. 1554)
1. Johanna Sibylla of Hanau-Lichtenberg
12. Reinhard of Zweibrücken-Bitsch (d. 1532)
6. James of Zweibrücken-Bitsch (1510-1570)
13. Anna of Salm (d.1541)
3. Countess Ludowika Margaretha of Zweibrücken-Bitsch (1523-1544)
14. Ernst V of Honstein (d. 1552)
7. Catherine of Honstein (d. 1570)
15. Anna of Bentheim
