= List of states in the Holy Roman Empire (O) =

Holy roman empire states

This is a list of states in the Holy Roman Empire beginning with the letter O. Some historians mark the beginning of the Empire as 800, with the coronation of Frankish king Charlemagne ("Charles the Great").

Name	Type	Imperial circle	Imperial diet	History
Oberbronn	Lordship	n/a	n/a	1232: First mentioned; fief of Lichtenberg; 1352: Sold to Ochsenstein as fief of Lichtenberg; 1382: Sold to Lichtenberg; 1456: Sold to Lützelstein as fief of Lichtenberg; 1480: To Zweibrücken-Bitsch; 1551: To Leiningen-Westerburg-Leiningen; 1622: To Leiningen-Westerburg-Oberbronn; 1665: 2/3 to Hesse-Homburg, 1/3 to Sinclair; 1727: Hessian portion to Hohenlohe-Waldenburg-Bartenstein; 1732: Sinclair portion to Lewenhaupt; 1764: Part of Hohenlohe portion to de Dietrich; 1789: All to France
Oberehnheim (Obernai)	Imperial City	Upp Rhen	RH	1240: Free from monastic control as town 1354: Joins Décapole; 1679: To France
Oberelsaß; See: Upper Alsace	Landgraviate			
Obermünster in Regensburg	Abbacy	Bav	RP	800s: Established with imperial immediacy 1315: HRE Princess of the Empire; 1802: To the Archbishopric of Regensburg; 1810: To Bavaria; suppressed
Oberried	Provostry	n/a	n/a	1237: Formed; 1249: Abolished; 1255: Reestablished; 1496: Advocacy to Freiburg within Further Austria; 1725: Advocacy to St Blaise's Abbey within Further Austria; 1806: To Baden
Obersalm; See: Salm in the Vosges	County			
Oberstein	Lordship	n/a	n/a	1075: First mentioned; to Stein; 1250: Line Daun-Oberstein established 1364: Partitioned into Oberstein-Gundheim and Oberstein-Kredenburg
Oberstein-Gundheim	Lordship	n/a	n/a	1364: Partitioned from Oberstein; 1661: Extinct; to the Palatinate; 1699: To Greiffenclau
Oberstein-Kredenburg	Lordship	n/a	n/a	1364: Partitioned from Oberstein; 1602: to Schmidtburg; 1611: Extinct; to Speyer
Obwalden	Imperial Valley	n/a	n/a	11th Century:To Lenzburg; 12th Century: Donated to Beromünster Abbey ?: To Murbach Abbey; 1291: Sold to Habsburg; with Nidwalden became a founding member of the Swiss League. 1309: Imperial immediacy 1648: Left Empire as member of Swiss Confederation
Ochsenhausen	1391: Abbey	Swab	SP	1093: Priory of St. Blaise's Abbey; 1391: Independent abbey 1495: Imperial immediacy 1803: To Schaesberg-Retersbeck (Tannheim), Sinzendorf (Winterrieden) and Metternich-Winneburg and Beilstein (remainder); 1806: All to Württemberg
Ochsenstein	Lordship	n/a	n/a	1187: First mentioned; branch of Geroldseck; 1391: Quarter of Ochsenstein sold to the Palatinate; 1485: Extinct; to Zweibrücken-Bitsch
Odenheim and Bruchsal	Abbey; 1503: Provostry	Upp Rhen	RP	1100–18: Established; 1494: Secularization; 1507: Relocated to Bruchsal; 1803: To Baden
Oettingen (Öttingen)	County	n/a	n/a	1141: First mentioned 1363: Acquired Spiegelberg; 1410: Partitioned into Oettingen-Oettingen and Oettingen-Wallerstein
Oettingen-Baldern	County	Swab	SC	1623: Partitioned from Oettingen-Wallerstein; 1798: Extinct; to Oettingen-Wallerstein
Oettingen-Flochberg	County	Swab	SC	1442: Partitioned from Oettingen-Wallerstein; 1522: Partitioned into itself and Oettingen-Wallerstein; 1548: Extinct; to Oettingen-Wallerstein
Oettingen-Oettingen	County; 1674: Principality	Swab	SC	1410: Partitioned from Oettingen; 1440: Extinct; to Oettingen-Wallerstein; 1442: Partitioned from Oettingen-Wallerstein; 1674: HRE Prince; 1731: Extinct; to Oettingen-Wallerstein
Oettingen-Spielberg	County; 1734: Principality	Swab	SC / PR	1623: Partitioned from Oettingen-Wallerstein; 1734: HRE Prince; 1803: Bench of Princes; 1806: To Bavaria; 1810: Parts to Württemberg
Oettingen-Wallerstein	County; 1774: Principality	Swab	SC / PR	1410: Partitioned from Oettingen; 1442: Partitioned into Oettingen-Oettingen, itself and Oettingen-Flochberg; 1486: Extinct; divided between Oettingen-Flochberg and Oettingen-Oettingen; 1522: Partitioned from Oettingen-Flochberg; 1549: Extinct; to Frederick V of Oettingen-Oettingen by marriage, who assumed the name Oettingen-Wallerstein; 1623: Partitioned into Oettingen-Spielberg, itself and Oettingen-Baldern; 1774: HRE Prince; 1803: Bench of Princes; 1806: To Bavaria; 1810: Parts to Württemberg
Offenburg	Imperial City	Swab	SW	1148: First mentioned 1240: Imperial Free City; 1803: To Baden
Olbrück	Lordship	Low Rhen	WE	1190: Comissioned by Wied to the Archbishopric of Cologne; 1244: Wied extinct; Olbrück was divided and shared ultimately with a dozen families, often in dispute with each other 1555: All to Waldbott von Bassenheim; 1794: To France; 1815: To Prussia
Oldenburg; Grand Duke of Oldenburg, Heir in Norway, Duke of Schleswig, Holstein, Stormarn, Ditmarshes & Oldenburg, Prince of Lübeck and Birkenfeld, Lord of Jever and Kniphausen	County; 1777: Duchy; 1815: Grand Duchy	Low Rhen	PR	1108: First mentioned; fief of Saxony; 1143: Partitioned into Wildeshausen and itself 1180: Imperial immediacy 1262: Partitioned into itself and Oldenburg-Delmenhorst; 1447: Reunited with Oldenburg-Delmenhorst; 1463: Partitioned into itself and Oldenburg-Delmenhorst; 1547: Reunited with Oldenburg-Delmenhorst; 1577: Partitioned into itself and Oldenburg-Delmenhorst; 1617: Reunited with Oldenburg-Delmenhorst; 1667: Extinct; to Denmark; 1773: To Paul of Russia; then to Frederick Augustus of Lübeck; 1777: HRE Duke; 1810: To France; 1815: Restored, Grand Duke
Oldenburg-Delmenhorst	County	Low Rhen	PR	1262: Partitioned from Oldenburg; 1447: Extinct; to Oldenburg; 1463: Partitioned from Oldenburg; 1482: To Oldenburg; 1483: To the Bishopric of Münster; 1484: Extinct; 1547: To Oldenburg; 1577: Partitioned from Oldenburg; 1617: Extinct; to Oldenburg
Orange	County; 1173: Principality	none	none	11th century: Independence from Provence; 1121: Extinct in male line; to Aumelas by marriage 1173: Extinct; to Baux by marriage; HRE Prince; 1193: To Baux-Orange; 1289: Acquired Baux; 1417: Extinct; to Chalon-Arlay; 1544: To William of Nassau-Dillenburg, who took the name Orange-Nassau; 1702: To France, who enfeoffed Francis Louis of Conti; 1713: To France, attached to the Dauphiné
Orange-Nassau	Principality	none	none	1544: Created when William of Nassau-Dillenburg inherited Orange; 1702: Extinct; succession dispute between Nassau-Dietz who took the name Orange-Nassau, and Prussia. Orange itself seized by France; 1739: Acquired Nassau-Hadamar and Nassau-Dillenburg; 1743: Acquired Nassau-Siegen; 1747: Acquired the Netherlands; 1795: Left bank territory to France; 1806: United with Nassau-Orange-Fulda; then dispersed between various states 1815: King of the Netherlands and Grand Duke of Luxembourg
Orlamünde	County	n/a	n/a	1032-1040: Mentioned, to counts of Orlamünde; By 1060: Extinct; to Weimar; 1062: To Weimar-Orlamünde
Orsini and Rosenberg; Prince of Orsini and Rosenberg, Baron of Lerchenau and Grafenstein	1681: HRE Count (Personalist); 1790: HRE Prince (Personalist)	n/a	FR	1681: Formed; 13th century: First mentioned 1681: Granted personalist vote in the Bench of Franconian Counts; 1684: Adopted style of Orsini-Rosenberg
Ortenau (Mortenau)	Landvogtei	n/a	n/a	763: First mentioned; gau county of the Carolingian Empire; 1007: To the Bishopric of Bamberg ?: To Zähringen; 1218: Seized by the Emperor; 1261: To Geroldseck; The Ortenau disintegrated soon after, though the title was held variously by Bach, Fürstenberg, Mörsperg, Ochsenstein and Oettingen, amongst others 1803: Much of the Ortenau to Breisgau-Modena and Baden; 1819: All to Baden
Ortenburg in Carinthia	County	n/a	n/a	1072: First mentioned; possibly related to Grögling-Hirschberg; 1306: Imperial immediacy 1418: Extinct; to Celje; 1456: Extinct; to Austria
Ortenburg (Ortenberg); Count of Ortenburg, Count and Lord of Tambach	County	Bav	WT	1135: Partitioned from Carinthia in the former lands of Vohburg-Passau; 1145: Acquired advocacies around Passau; 1158: Acquired much of Vornbach; 1163: Acquired Murach; 1173: Acquired Kraiburg and Marquartstein; 1188: Acquired Sulzbach; partitioned into Ortenburg-Kraiburg and Ortenburg-Ortenburg; 1272: Remaining territories held by Ortenburg-Ortenburg; henceforth known as Ortenburg; 1319: Acquired Wildenegg; 1381: Side line Ortenburg-Dorfbach founded 1395: Partitioned into Ortenburg-Neuortenburg and Ortenburg-Altortenburg; 1446: Reunited by Ortenburg-Neuortenburg; 1517: Acquired Mattighofen; 1805: To Bavaria; received in exchange Tambach; 1806: Tambach to Bavaria
Ortenburg-Altortenburg	County	n/a	n/a	1395: Partitioned from Ortenburg; 1416: Acquired Niederaltaich Abbey; 1446: Extinct; to Ortenburg-Neuortenburg
Ortenburg-Dorfbach	County	n/a	n/a	1381: Founded upon marriage of Alrams I with Barbara von Rottau; fief of Ortenburg; 1431: Imperial immediacy 1461: Extinct; to Ortenburg-Neuortenburg; 1652: Sold to Peckenzell
Ortenburg-Kraiburg	County	n/a	n/a	1188: Partitioned from Ortenburg; 1200: Acquired Rotter; 1208: Acquired County Palatine of Bavaria and Neuburg; 1217: Acquired Griesbach-Waxenberg; 1239: Lost Ramsau and territories in Brixen to Regensburg; 1248: Extinct in male line; lost County Palatine of Bavaria; 1256: To Werdenberg-Sargans by marriage 1259: Sold to Lower Bavaria
Ortenburg-Murach	County	n/a	n/a	1238: Partitioned from Ortenburg-Ortenburg; 1268: Made fief of Upper Bavaria; 1272: Sold to Upper Bavaria; 1285: Extinct
Ortenburg-Neuortenburg	County	n/a	n/a	1395: Partitioned from Ortenburg; 1445: Acquired Saldenburg; 1446: Renamed to Ortenburg
Ortenburg-Ortenburg	County	n/a	n/a	1188: Partitioned from Ortenburg; 1217: Acquired Neustadt; 1229: Imperial immediacy 1238: Partitioned into itself and Ortenburg-Murach; 1257: Extinct; to Gebhard of Ortenburg-Murach; 1272: Renamed to Ortenburg
Osnabrück	Bishopric	Low Rhen	EC	783: Fief of Saxony; 1180: Fief of Tecklenburg; 1226: HRE Prince of the Empire; 1236: Imperial immediacy After 1648: Osnabrück alternately ruled by a Protestant Administrator and Catholic Prince-Bishop; 1803: To Hanover; 1806: To Prussia; 1807: To Westphalia; 1810: To France; 1815: To Hanover
Osterberg	Lordship; 1712: Barony	n/a	n/a	1225: First mentioned; to Elchingen Abbey by 1448: Sold to Ochsenhausen Abbey; 1455: Sold to Rechberg-Hohenrechberg; 1460: To Rechberg-Kronburg; 1577: To Rechberg-Osterberg; 1679: Sold to Meyer von Röfingen auf Bühl who assumed the name Osterberg; 1712: HRE Barony; 1806: To Bavaria
Öttingen; See: Oettingen				
Ottobeuren	Abbacy	Swab	SP	764: Formed; 1299: Imperial immediacy 1624: Fief of the Bishopric of Augsburg; 1710: Imperial immediacy 1802: To Bavaria
Overijssel	Lordship	Burg	n/a	11th Century: Territory nominally ceded to the Bishopric of Utrecht as the Oversticht; 1336: To Guelders; 1347: To the Bishopric of Utrecht; 1528: To the Spanish Netherlands; Burgundian Circle; 1580: To the Netherlands; 1795: To the Batavian Republic; 1810: To France; 1815: To the Netherlands
