= Anna Sibylle of Hanau-Lichtenberg =

German noblewoman (1542–1580)

- Born: 16 May 1542; Lichtenberg
- Died: 5 January 1580 (aged 37)
- Noble family: House of Hanau
- Spouse: Louis of Fleckenstein-Dagstuhl
- Father: Philipp IV, Count of Hanau-Lichtenberg
- Mother: Eleonore of Fürstenberg

Countess Anna Sibylle of Hanau-Lichtenberg (16 May 1542 – 5 January 1580) was a German noblewoman. She was born in Lichtenberg, the eldest surviving daughter of Count Philipp IV (20 May 1512 – 19 February 1590) and his wife, Countess Eleonore of Fürstenberg (11 October 1523 – 26 April 1544).

== Marriage and issue ==
Anna Sibylle married on 12 October 1562 to Louis of Fleckenstein-Dagstuhl (1542-1577). They had a son:

- Philip Wolfgang of Fleckenstein-Dagstuhl (d. 1618). Married to 1 Alexandra of Rappoltstein (15 March 1565 – 9 April 1610).
  - Georg II of Fleckenstein-Dagstuhl (1588-1644), regent of Hanau, last of the Fleckenstein-Dagstuhl line. Married to Maria Magdalena of Hohensachsen (d. after 1628).

=== Legacy ===
This marriage proved to be important to the history of the House of Hanau and the counties of Hanau-Münzenberg and Hanau-Lichtenberg, because her grandson Georg II of Fleckenstein-Dagstuhl played a major role during the final phase of the Thirty Years' War. He acted as regent for the underage count Friedrich Casimir, Count of Hanau-Lichtenberg, Hanau-Lichtenberg from 1641 to 1647 and in Hanau-Münzneberg from 1642 to 1647. Georg II achieved the reunification of the two parts of Hanau, despite resistance of the Landgrave of Hesse-Kassel, who was the liege lord of Hanau-Münzenberg.

== Ancestors ==
Ancestors of Anna Sibylle of Hanau-Lichtenberg

8. Philipp II, Count of Hanau-Lichtenberg (1462-1504)
4. Philipp III, Count of Hanau-Lichtenberg (1482-1533)
9. Anna of Isenburg-Büdingen (d. 1522)
2. Philipp IV, Count of Hanau-Lichtenberg (1514-159)
10. Christoph I, Margrave of Baden-Baden (1453-1527)
5. Sibylle of Baden (1485-1518)
11. Ottilie of Katzenelnbogen (1453-1517)
1. Anna Sibylle of Hanau-Lichtenberg
12. Wolfgang of Fürstenberg (1465-1509)
6. Friedrich II of Fürstenberg (1496-1559)
13. Elisabeth of Solms-Braunfels (1469-1514)
3. Eleonore of Fürstenberg (1523-1544)
14. Christoph of Werdenberg (d. 1534)
7. Anna of Werdenberg (d. 1554)
15. Eleonora Gonzaga of Mantua (d. 1512)
