= Bastberg Hill =

Mountain in France

Bastberg
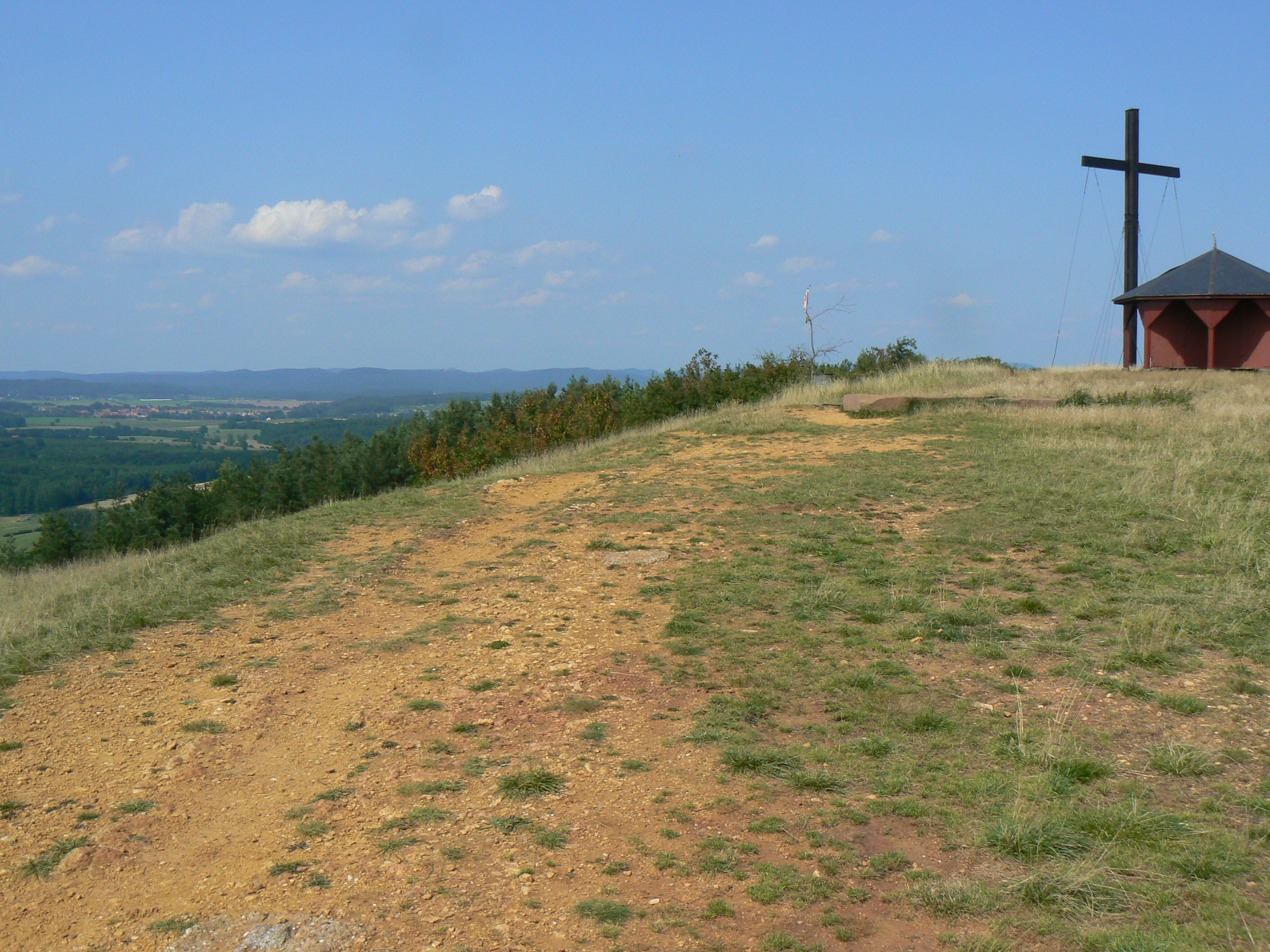
- Summit of the hill

Highest point
- Elevation: 326 m (1,070 ft)
- Coordinates: 48°48′42″N 7°27′04″E

Naming
- Native name: Mont Saint-Sébastien (French); Bàschtbärri (Alsatian)

Geography
- Location within France Location within Grand Est
- Country: France
- Region: Grand Est
- Department: Bas-Rhin
- Parent range: Northern Vosges

Geology
- Mountain type: Hill

The Bastberg (French: Mont Saint-Sébastien, Alsatian: Bàschtbärri), also called Petit-Bastberg, is a summit located near the Northern Vosges Regional Nature Park, in the commune of Bouxwiller. It culminates at 326 meters. The ecosystem is fragile due to human and natural intrusions, and has been the subject of conservation measures since 1989.

== Geography ==
=== Location and topography ===
The Bastberg hill culminates at an altitude of 326 metres (1,070 ft). Not far away, between the Bastberg and Bouxwiller, is the hill of Galgenberg (French: Mont de la Potence). Although this peak is only 321 m high, its other name is Grand-Bastberg.

=== Geology ===
The soil of the Bastberg is made up of limestone rocks. Its structure is a syncline in synform. The most recent layers are superimposed on the oldest. But by the folding of the structure and by erosion, the oldest geological layers outcrop at its summit.

=== Fauna and flora ===
The vegetation is sparse and the hill has remarkable flora and fauna. There are orchids such as Ophrys fuciflora and Lizard orchid and insects such as swallowtail butterfly and praying mantis.

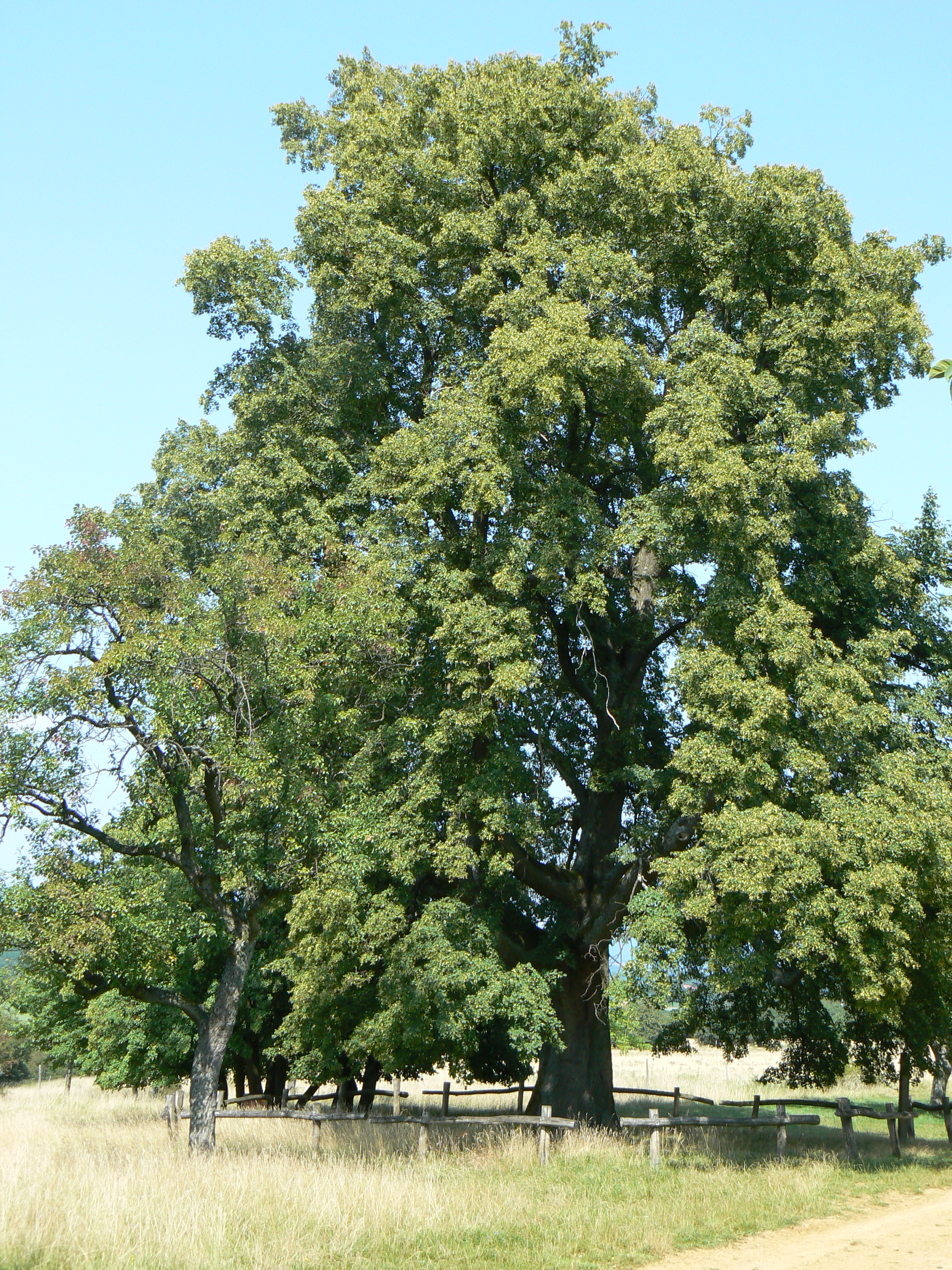
Goethe's lime tree on the Bastberg

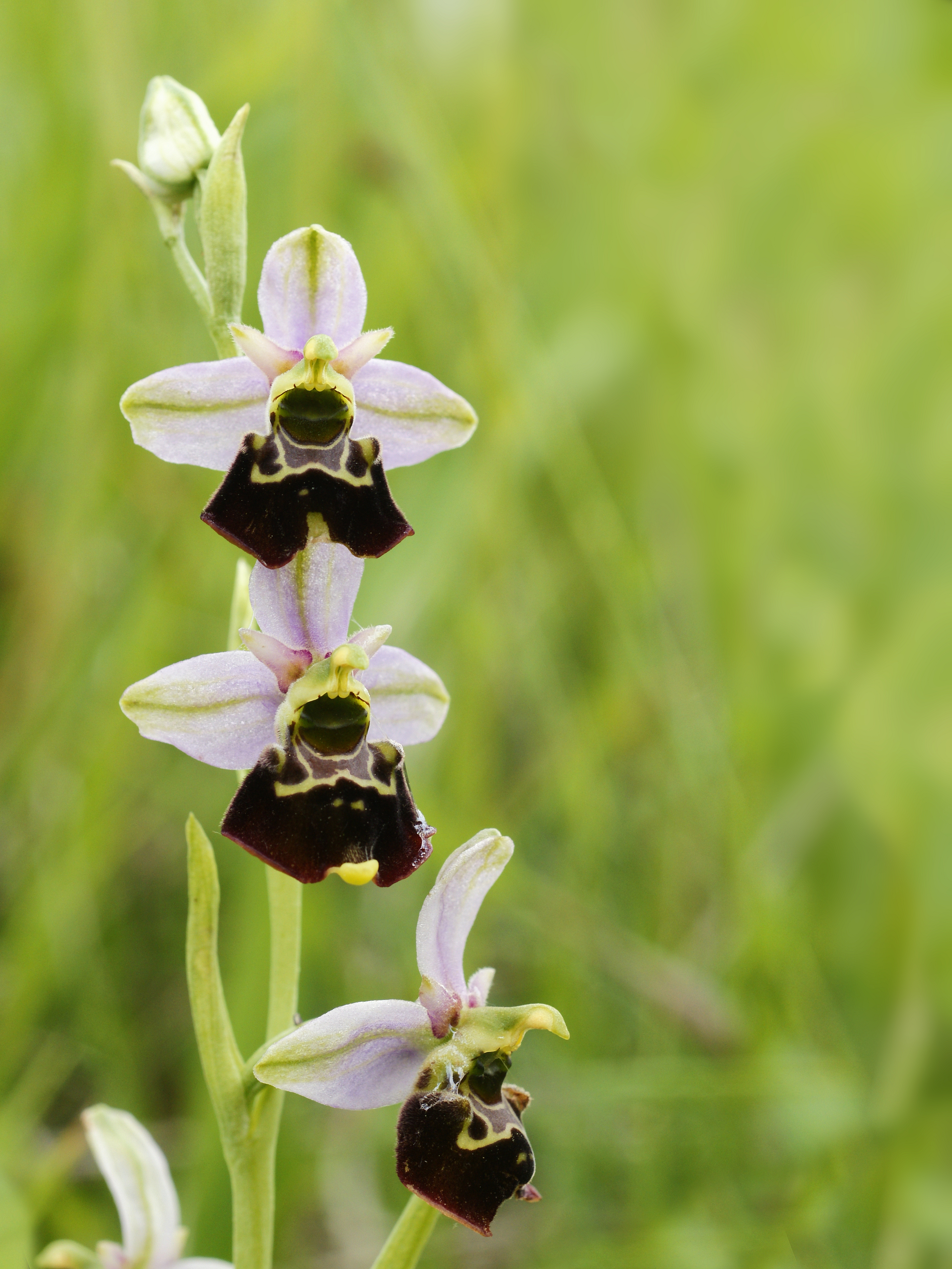
Ophyrs fuciflora (late spider orchid)

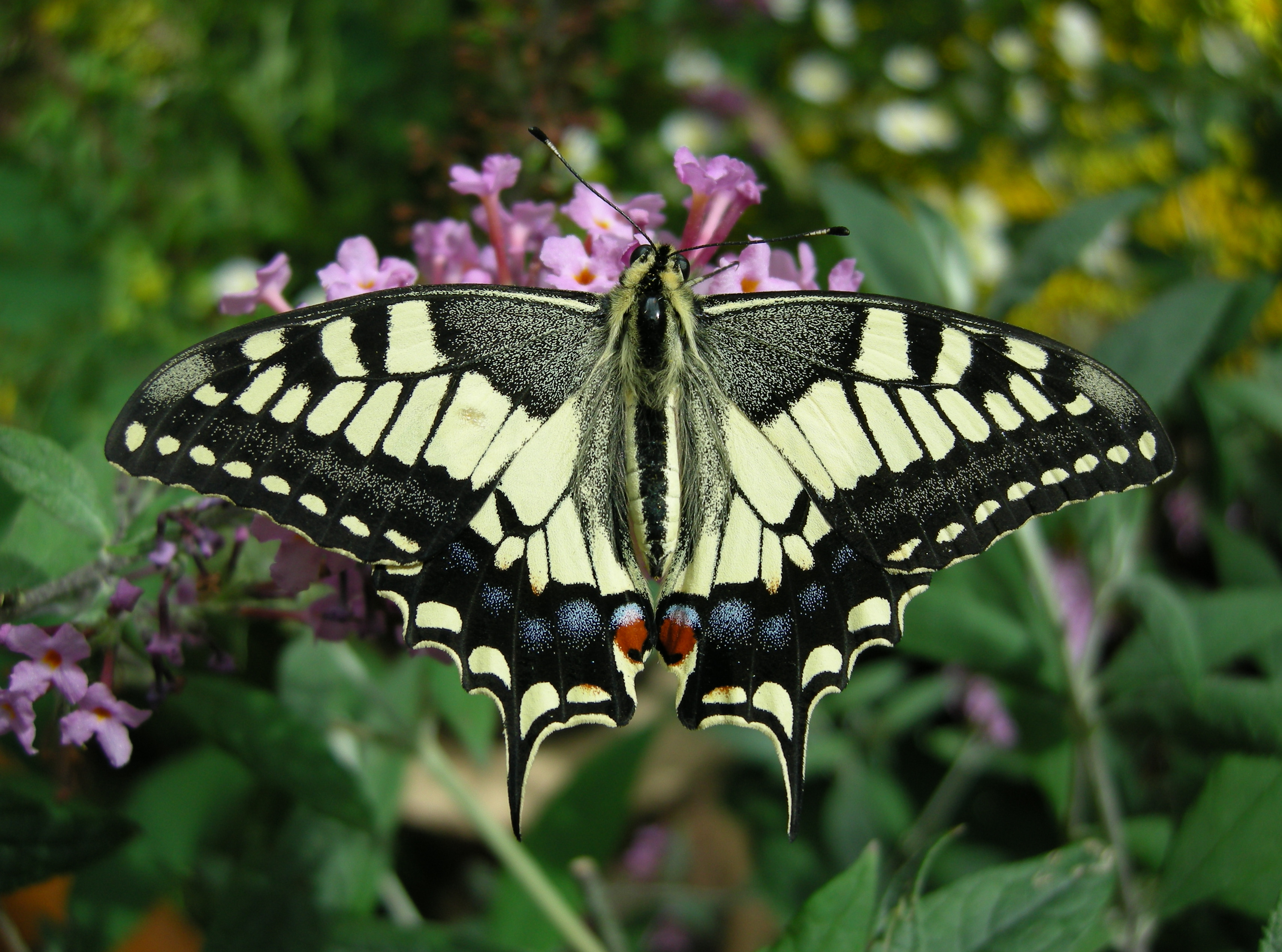
Swallowtail

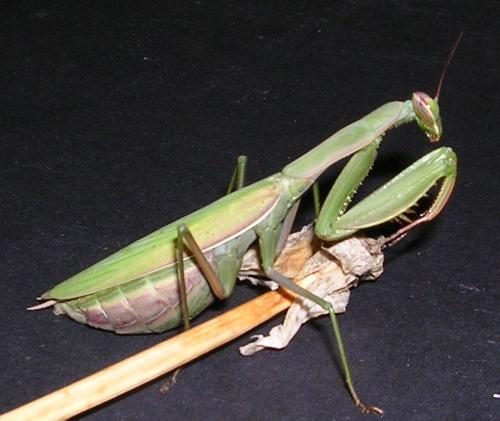
Praying mantis

== Activities ==
=== Environmental protection ===
Since 1 December 1989, part of the site has become a voluntary protected nature reserve covering 6.45 hectares. It is managed by the Conservatoire d'espaces naturels Alsace (transl. Conservatory of Natural Areas of Alsace) and is subject to measures aimed at perpetuating this ecosystem. Dated March 16, 2012, this area has been classified as a regional nature reserve (transformation of the status of RNVA into RNR) by deliberations of the Regional Council of Alsace.

The Bastberg site is classified by the DGAC and has been listed on aeronautical charts 8380-a-LF (aeromodelling). It is therefore known from military and civilian planes and helicopters: area 8020 currently.

=== Astronomical observation site ===
This hill has been the privileged place for astronomical observations for many years, mainly in the summer period (July - August), for the "Ciel d'Alsace" (transl. Sky of Alsace) and "Nuits des étoiles" (transl. Nights of the Stars) events.

These demonstrations were made by the Némésis club of Saverne in partnership with other clubs (Artémis of Strasbourg, Astro Junior of Hœnheim) and associations, for many years before the year 2000; as with the 1999 solar eclipse which was almost completely unobserved, the sky covered with rain clouds.

Since 2006, the Hanau Astronomie club has been organizing them.

== Legend ==
According to local traditions, the Bastberg was a sabbath place for the sorcerers of the region.
