= Philipp IV of Hanau-Lichtenberg =

Count of Hanau-Lichtenberg

Philipp IV, Count of Hanau-Lichtenberg
- Born: 20 September 1514; Babenhausen
- Died: 19 February 1590 (aged 75); Lichtenberg Castle, County of Hanau-Lichtenberg
- Buried: Castle Church in Lichtenberg
- Noble family: House of Hanau
- Spouse: Eleonore of Fürstenberg
- Father: Philipp III, Count of Hanau-Lichtenberg
- Mother: Sibylle of Baden

Philipp IV of Hanau-Lichtenberg (20 September 1514, in Babenhausen – 19 February 1590, in Lichtenberg) was from 1538 to 1590 the reigning Count of Hanau-Lichtenberg. Before his accession he had already conducted government business on behalf of his father, Count Philipp III. He was very interested in alchemy.

== Government ==
=== Reformation ===
Unlike his father, Philipp IV stood behind the Reformation. During his reign, the Lutheran faith took hold in the county. He appointed the clergy himself. After a long vacancy, he appointed a pastor in Bouxwiller (German: Buchsweiler) who was committed to the new doctrine. He worked with theologicians Erasmus Sarcerius and Philipp Neunheller, the reformer of the County of Hanau-Münzenberg. The new faith was widely introduced in 1544 and on 28 May 1548, Philipp convened a synod at Bouxwiller with all the pastors of the county of Hanau-Lichtenberg, in order to commit them to the new doctrine. This apparently happened very hesitantly, and the process of changing the clergy to adherents of the Lutheran faith continued well into the 1560s.

Philipp participated in the Diet of Augsburg in 1555, where the Peace of Augsburg was agreed, as well as the Diet in Augsburg in 1556, and the Diet of Speyer in 1570. The Catholic equipment that the, now Lutheran, churches no longer needed, was sold off from 1558 onwards. Philipp exchanged the possessions of the secularized Patershausen Abbey for Brumath, which had been held by the Archbishopric of Mainz. In 1573, a church order was adopted in Hanau-Lichtenberg. In 1580, he was among the signatories of the Book of Concord.

=== Guardianships in Hanau-Münzenberg ===
Count Philipp Ludwig I was still a minor when he inherited Hanau-Münzenberg in 1561. Philipp IV took up the guardianship, together with Count John VI of Nassau-Dillenburg. When Philipp Ludwig I died in 1580, they again acted as guardian for his minor sons Philipp Ludwig II and Albrecht of Hanau-Münzenberg. This time, there was a third guardian: Count Ludwig I of Sayn-Wittgenstein. Because Albrecht was only born in the year before his father's death and the fact that there were substantial religious disputes between the guardians, the guardianship could only be terminated in 1608. Philipp IV, however, could be replaced by his son Philipp V in this guardianship council in 1585.

Philipp Ludwig I's widow, Countess Magdalene of Waldeck-Wildungen, married in 1581 with John VII "the Middle" of Nassau-Siegen, a son of John VI. Consequently, the wards, Philipp Ludwig II and Albrecht, grew up at the court in Nassau-Dillenburg, a center of Calvinism and closely connected with the, also Calvinist, in the Electorate of the Palatinate court. The Lutheran Philipp IV opposed this Calvinist influence, as did his son Philipp V after he took over. This opposition, however, was in vain. Philipp V also tried to have the Lutheran Count Palatine Richard of Simmern-Sponheim appointed as an extra guardian. This attempt failed, despite a ruling in his favour by the Reichskammergericht. The Calvinist majority of the guardians prevented the population of Hanau-Münzenberg from paying homage to Richard. The majority then had the Electoral Administrator Count Palatine Johann Casimir of Simmern appointed as "upper guardian" — a purely honorary position — thereby strengthening the Calvinist majority among the guardians.

=== Territorial policies ===
The Archbishopric of Mainz objected to the reformation policy of Hanau-Lichtenberg and saw to it that Catholicism prevailed in the condominiums of Ober-Roden and Rodgau. Philipp IV managed to largely keep his county out of the armed conflicts of the second half of the 16th Century, that were often started under the pretext of religious differences.

Hanau-Lichtenberg owned half of the Lordship of Lichtenberg. In 1570, Count Jakob of Zweibrücken-Bitsch, who owned the other half, died without a male heir and Philipp IV manage to acquire his half as well. He had Lichtenberg Castle renovated and modernized by the military architect Daniel Specklin.

Philipp IV tried to conclude an inheritance treaty between the two lines of Counts of Hanau, Hanau-Münzenberg and Hanau-Lichtenberg, to the effect that, should one of the lines die out, the other line would inherit. Such a treaty was eventually signed after his death, in 1610, so when the Hanau-Münzenberg line died out in 1642, Hanau-Lichtenberg inherited.

In 1565, Philipp IV was appointed councillor to Emperor Maximilian II. Later, he became councillor to Maximilian II's successor Rudolf II.

=== Move to Alsace ===
He was the first Count of Hanau-Lichtenberg who saw the Alsatian possessions as the most important part of the county, rather than Babenhausen and he moved his residence there. Nevertheless, in 1578 he added a south wing to Babenhausen Castle. He also purchased Falkentein Castle and built the Château du Falkenstein on the castle grounds. The village of Philippsbourg developed around the château.

=== Old age and death ===
From 1585, the gradually transferred the business of government to his son, Philipp V.

Philipp IV died on 19 February 1590 in Lichtenberg. Philipp IV was the longest-lived member of the House of Hanau and also the count from Hanau, who has ruled the longest. A funeral sermon was published. He was buried in the crypt he had created in the Castle Church in Lichtenberg.

== Marriage and issue ==
Philipp IV married on 22 August 1538 in Heiligenberg with Eleonore of Fürstenberg (born: 11 October 1523; died: 23 June 1544). They had the following children:

1. Amalie (born: 23 February 1540 in Bouxwiller; died: 1 May 1540).
2. Philipp V (born: 21 February 1541 in Bouxwiller; died: 2 June 1599).
3. Anna Sibylle (born: 16 May 1542; died: 24 March 1612).
4. Johanna (born: 23 May 1543 in Bouxwiller; died: 5 December 1599 in Babenhausen, buried there).
5. Eleonore (born: 26 April 1544, Bouxwiller; died: 6 January 1585, buried in Ingelfingen), married to Albrecht of Hohenlohe-Weikersheim-Langenburg (born: 28 May 1543; died: 16 November 1575). This marriage was childless.

Philipp IV made his son Philipp V marry, contrary to his otherwise Lutheran policy, with the distantly related Roman Catholic Ludowika Margaretha of Zweibrücken-Bitsch, daughter of Jakob, the last Count of Zweibrücken-Bitsch. He thought her inheritance was more important than her religion.

== Ancestors ==
Ancestors of Philipp IV of Hanau-Lichtenberg

8. Philipp I, Count of Hanau-Lichtenberg (1417–1480)
4. Philipp II, Count of Hanau-Lichtenberg (1462–1504)
9. Anna of Lichtenberg (1442–1474)
2. Philipp III, Count of Hanau-Lichtenberg (1482–1538)
10. Ludwig II of Isenburg-Büdingen (1422–1511)
5. Anna of Isenburg-Büdingen (d. 1522)
11. Maria of Nassau-Wiesbaden-Idstein (1438–1480)
1. Philipp IV of Hanau-Lichtenberg
12. Karl I, Margrave of Baden-Baden (d. 1475)
6. Christoph I, Margrave of Baden-Baden (1453–1527)
13. Katharina of Austria (1424–1493)
3. Sibylle of Baden (1485–1518)
14. Philipp the Younger of Katzenelnbogen (1427–1453)
7. Ottilie of Katzenelnbogen (1453–1517)
15. Ottilie of Nassau-Siegen (1437–1493)

== Footnotes ==
Philipp IV of Hanau-Lichtenberg House of Hanau Born: 20 September 1514 Died: 19 February 1590
Preceded by Philipp III	Count of Hanau-Lichtenberg; 1538–1590	Succeeded by Philipp V
