= Reipertswiller =

- Commune
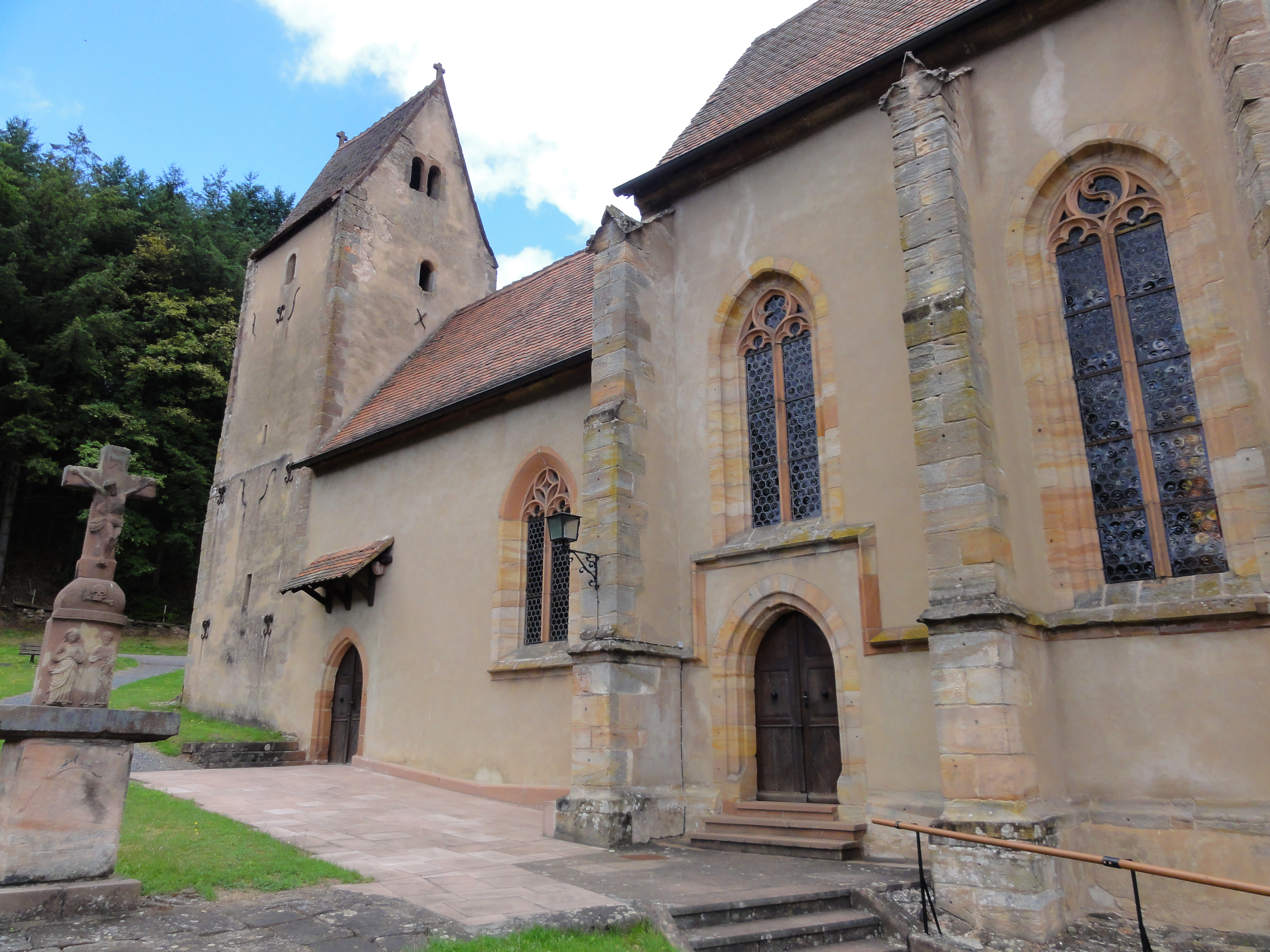
- The church in Reipertswiller

- Coat of arms
- Location of Reipertswiller
- Location within France Location within Grand Est
- Coordinates: 48°55′58″N 7°27′56″E
- Country: France
- Region: Grand Est
- Department: Bas-Rhin
- Arrondissement: Saverne
- Canton: Ingwiller

Government
  - Mayor (2020–2026): Samuel Leichtweis
- Area^{1}: 19.21 km^{2} (7.42 sq mi)
- Highest elevation: 421 m (1,381 ft)
- Lowest elevation: 207 m (679 ft)
- Population (2023): 842
  - Density: 43.8/km^{2} (114/sq mi)
- Time zone: UTC+01:00 (CET)
  - Summer (DST): UTC+02:00 (CEST)
- INSEE/Postal code: 67392 /67340
- ^{1} French Land Register data, which excludes lakes, ponds, glaciers > 1 km^{2} (0.386 sq mi or 247 acres) and river estuaries.

Reipertswiller (French pronunciation: [ʁaipɛʁtsvilɛʁ]; German: Reipertsweiler) is a commune in the Bas-Rhin department in Grand Est in north-eastern France.

In 2019, Reipertswiller had 850 inhabitants. It is bordered on the North by Mouterhouse, on the Northeast by Baerenthal, on the Southeast by Lichtenberg, on the Southwest by Wimmenau and in the Northwest by Goetzenbruck.

The commune is part of the Parc naturel régional des Vosges du Nord.

== See also ==
- Communes of the Bas-Rhin department
