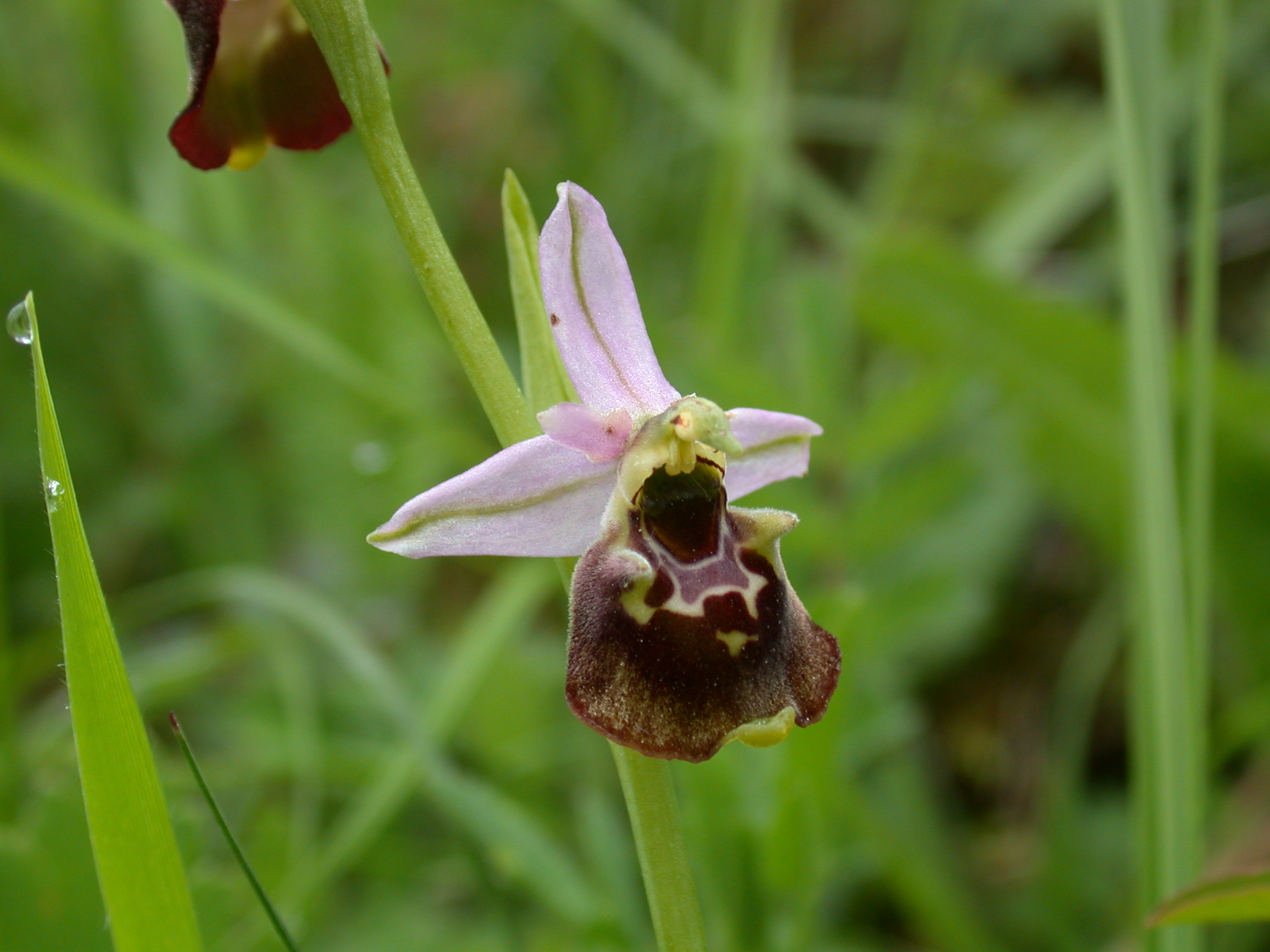
- Close-up of flower

Scientific classification
- Kingdom: Plantae
- Clade: Tracheophytes
- Clade: Angiosperms
- Clade: Monocots
- Order: Asparagales
- Family: Orchidaceae
- Subfamily: Orchidoideae
- Genus: Ophrys
- Species: O. holosericea

Binomial name
- Ophrys holosericea (Burm.f.) Greuter

Synonyms
- List: Arachnites biancae Tod.; Arachnites fuciflorus F.W.Schmidt; Arachnites oxyrhynchus Tod.; Epipactis arachnites (Scop.) F.W.Schmidt; Ophrys aegirtica P.Delforge; Ophrys aeoli P.Delforge; Ophrys anapei O.Danesch & E.Danesch; Ophrys andria P.Delforge; Ophrys andria subsp. halkionis (G.Kretzschmar & H.Kretzschmar) Kreutz; Ophrys annae Devillers-Tersch. & Devillers; Ophrys apifera subsp. arachnites (Scop.) H.C.Watson; Ophrys appennina Romolini & Soca; Ophrys apulica (O.Danesch & E.Danesch) O.Danesch & E.Danesch; Ophrys apulica subsp. pharensis Kranjcev; Ophrys arachnites (Scop.) Reichard; Ophrys arachnites subsp. oxyrrhynchos (Tod.) Nyman; Ophrys aramaeorum P.Delforge; Ophrys baeteniorum P.Delforge; Ophrys biancae (Tod.) Macch.; Ophrys bombyliflora Spreng.; Ophrys brachyotes Rchb.; Ophrys calliantha Bartolo & Pulv.; Ophrys candica Greuter, Matthäs & Risse; Ophrys candica (E.Nelson ex Soó) H.Baumann & Künkele; Ophrys candica subsp. calliantha (Bartolo & Pulv.) Kreutz; Ophrys candica subsp. cytherea B.Baumann & H.Baumann; Ophrys candica subsp. lacaena (P.Delforge) Kreutz; Ophrys candica subsp. lyciensis (Paulus, Gügel, D.Rückbr. & U.Rückbr.) Kreutz; Ophrys candica var. minoa (C.Alibertis & A.Alibertis) Paulus, Gügel, D.Rückbr. & U.Rückbr.; Ophrys candica subsp. minoa C.Alibertis & A.Alibertis; Ophrys candica f. minoa (C.Alibertis & A.Alibertis) P.Delforge; Ophrys celiensis (O.Danesch & E.Danesch) P.Delforge; Ophrys chestermanii (J.J.Wood) Gölz & H.R.Reinhard; Ophrys chiosica P.Delforge, Onckelinx & Saliaris; Ophrys cinnabarina Romolini & Soca; Ophrys colossaea P.Delforge; Ophrys × cosentiana H.Baumann & Künkele; Ophrys cyrenaica (Kreutz) P.Delforge; Ophrys cytherea (B.Baumann & H.Baumann) P.Delforge; Ophrys demangei (Scappat.) P.Delforge; Ophrys dinarica Kranjcev & P.Delforge; Ophrys discors Bianca; Ophrys druentica P.Delforge & Viglione; Ophrys elatior Paulus; Ophrys episcopalis Poir.; Ophrys episcopalis subsp. libanotica (B.Baumann & H.Baumann) Véla & Viglione; Ophrys episcopalis var. samia P.Delforge; Ophrys ethemeae (Kreutz) P.Delforge; Ophrys flavescens Sassenf.; Ophrys fuciflora (Crantz) Rchb.f.; Ophrys fuciflora (F.W.Schmidt) Moench; Ophrys fuciflora subsp. aestuariensis J.-P.Ring, J.-C.Querré, Biron & Fouquet; Ophrys fuciflora subsp. andria (P.Delforge) Faurh.; Ophrys fuciflora subsp. annae (Devillers-Tersch. & Devillers) R.Engel & P.Quentin; Ophrys fuciflora var. apiformoides Balayer; Ophrys fuciflora subsp. apulica O.Danesch & E.Danesch; Ophrys fuciflora subsp. biancae (Tod.) Faurh.; Ophrys fuciflora subsp. candica E.Nelson ex Soó; Ophrys fuciflora var. carmeloides Balayer; Ophrys fuciflora subsp. celiensis O.Danesch & E.Danesch; Ophrys fuciflora subsp. chestermanii (J.J.Wood) H.Blatt & W.Wirth; Ophrys fuciflora subsp. demangei Scappat.; Ophrys fuciflora var. dinarica (Kranjcev & P.Delforge) Faurh.; Ophrys fuciflora subsp. elatior Gumpr.; Ophrys fuciflora subsp. elatior (Paulus) R.Engel & P.Quentin; Ophrys fuciflora subsp. gracilis Büel, O.Danesch & E.Danesch; Ophrys fuciflora var. gracilis (Büel, O.Danesch & E.Danesch) Faurh.; Ophrys fuciflora subsp. lacaitae (Lojac.) Soó; Ophrys fuciflora subsp. lorenae E.De Martino & Centur.; Ophrys fuciflora subsp. maxima (H.Fleischm.) Soó; Ophrys fuciflora subsp. montiliensis Aubenas & Scappat.; Ophrys fuciflora subsp. oblita (Kreutz, Gügel & W.Hahn) Faurh., H.A.Pedersen & S.G.Christ.; Ophrys fuciflora subsp. oxyrrhynchos (Tod.) Soó; Ophrys fuciflora subsp. pallidiconi Faurh.; Ophrys fuciflora subsp. parvimaculata O.Danesch & E.Danesch; Ophrys fuciflora var. posidonia (P.Delforge) Faurh.; Ophrys fuciflora subsp. souchei R.Martin & Véla; Ophrys fuciflora f. tallosii Soó; Ophrys fuciflora subsp. tetraloniae (W.P.Teschner) Faurh.; Ophrys fuciflora f. triloboviridis Soó; Ophrys fuciflora subsp. untchjii M.Schulze; Ophrys gracilis (Büel, O.Danesch & E.Danesch) Englmaier; Ophrys graeca (B.Baumann & H.Baumann) S.Hertel & H.Weyland; Ophrys gresivaudanica O.Gerbaud; Ophrys halia Paulus; Ophrys heldreichii subsp. pharia (Devillers & Devillers-Tersch.) Kreutz; Ophrys helios Kreutz; Ophrys helios f. taloniensis (Kreutz) P.Delforge; Ophrys holosericea subsp. aeoli (P.Delforge) Kreutz; Ophrys holosericea var. aliceae Argiolas; Ophrys holosericea subsp. annae (Devillers-Tersch. & Devillers) H.Baumann, Giotta, Künkele, R.Lorenz & Piccitto; Ophrys holosericea subsp. appennina (Romolini & Soca) Kreutz; Ophrys holosericea subsp. aramaeorum (P.Delforge) Kreutz; Ophrys holosericea var. bicolor E.Breiner & R.Breiner; Ophrys holosericea subsp. candica H.A.Pedersen & Faurh.; Ophrys holosericea subsp. celiensis (O.Danesch & E.Danesch) O.Danesch & E.Danesch; Ophrys holosericea f. chlorantha Lumare, Medagli, Dura & Anelli; Ophrys holosericea subsp. cinnabarina (Romolini & Soca) Kreutz; Ophrys holosericea subsp. colossaea (P.Delforge) Kreutz; Ophrys holosericea subsp. cyrenaica Kreutz; Ophrys holosericea subsp. dinarica (Kranjcev & P.Delforge) Kreutz; Ophrys holosericea subsp. druentica (P.Delforge & Viglione) Kreutz; Ophrys holosericea subsp. episcopalis (Poir.) Kreutz; Ophrys holosericea subsp. ethemeae Kreutz; Ophrys holosericea var. flavescens (Rosbach) H.Sund.; Ophrys holosericea subsp. graeca B.Baumann & H.Baumann; Ophrys holosericea subsp. gresivaudanica (O.Gerbaud) Kreutz; Ophrys holosericea subsp. halia (Paulus) Kreutz; Ophrys holosericea subsp. halicarnassia H.Baumann & Künkele; Ophrys holosericea subsp. halkionis (G.Kretzschmar & H.Kretzschmar) Kreutz; Ophrys holosericea subsp. helios (Kreutz) Kreutz; Ophrys holosericea subsp. lacaena (P.Delforge) H.Baumann & R.Lorenz; Ophrys holosericea subsp. laxiflora Zelesny & Kreutz; Ophrys holosericea subsp. libanotica B.Baumann & H.Baumann; Ophrys holosericea subsp. linearis (Moggr.) Kreutz; Ophrys holosericea subsp. lorenae (E.De Martino & Centur.) Kreutz; Ophrys holosericea subsp. lyciensis (Paulus, Gügel, D.Rückbr. & U.Rückbr.) H.Baumann & R.Lorenz; Ophrys holosericea subsp. maxima (H.Fleischm.) Greuter; Ophrys holosericea subsp. medea (Devillers & Devillers-Tersch.) Kreutz; Ophrys holosericea subsp. mesopotamica Kreutz & H.Baumgartner bis; Ophrys holosericea subsp. paolina Liverani & Romolini; Ophrys holosericea subsp. pinguis (Romolini & Soca) Kreutz; Ophrys holosericea subsp. posidonia (P.Delforge) Kreutz; Ophrys holosericea subsp. serotina (Rolli ex Paulus) Kreutz; Ophrys holosericea subsp. taloniensis Kreutz; Ophrys holosericea subsp. tetraloniae (W.P.Teschner) Kreutz; Ophrys holosericea subsp. toroslaria Kreutz, Gügel & Zaiss; Ophrys holosericea subsp. untchjii (M.Schulze) Kreutz; Ophrys holosericea subsp. vanbruggeniana J.Essink, L.Essink & Kreutz; Ophrys impresciae Soca; Ophrys insectifera subsp. arachnites (Scop.) Moggr.; Ophrys insectifera subvar. linearis Moggr.; Ophrys istriensis S.Hertel, Paulus & Weyland; Ophrys kranjcevii P.Delforge; Ophrys lacaena P.Delforge; Ophrys lacaena f. cytherea (B.Baumann & H.Baumann) P.Delforge; Ophrys lacaena f. graeca (B.Baumann & H.Baumann) P.Delforge; Ophrys lacaitae Lojac.; Ophrys libanotica (B.Baumann & H.Baumann) P.Delforge; Ophrys linearis (Moggr.) P.Delforge, Devillers & Devillers-Tersch.; Ophrys lorenae (E.De Martino & Centur.) P.Delforge; Ophrys lyciensis Paulus, Gügel, D.Rückbr. & U.Rückbr.; Ophrys malvasiana S.Hertel & H.Weyland; Ophrys maxima (H.Fleischm.) Paulus & Gack; Ophrys medea Devillers & Devillers-Tersch.; Ophrys mesopotamica (Kreutz & H.Baumgartner bis) P.Delforge; Ophrys minoa (C.Alibertis & A.Alibertis) P.Delforge; Ophrys montiliensis (Aubenas & Scappat.) P.Delforge; Ophrys montis-aviarii Hirschy & Bennery; Ophrys nicotiae Zodda; Ophrys oblita Kreutz, Gügel & W.Hahn; Ophrys oestrifera Rchb.; Ophrys oxyrrhynchos Tod.; Ophrys oxyrrhynchos subsp. biancae (Tod.) Galesi, Cristaudo & Maugeri; Ophrys oxyrrhynchos subsp. calliantha (Bartolo & Pulv.) Galesi, Cristaudo & Maugeri; Ophrys oxyrrhynchos subsp. celiensis (O.Danesch & E.Danesch) Del Prete; Ophrys oxyrrhynchos subsp. ingrassiae Dura, Turco, Gennaio & Medagli; Ophrys oxyrrhynchos subsp. lacaitae (Lojac.) Del Prete; Ophrys parvimaculata (O.Danesch & E.Danesch) Paulus & Gack; Ophrys personata P.Delforge; Ophrys peucetiae Lozito, D'Emerico, Medagli & Turco; Ophrys pharia Devillers & Devillers-Tersch.; Ophrys pinguis Romolini & Soca; Ophrys posidonia P.Delforge; Ophrys saliarisii Paulus & M.Hirth; Ophrys samia (P.Delforge) P.Delforge; Ophrys serotina Rolli ex Paulus; Ophrys souchei (R.Martin & Véla) P.Delforge; Ophrys tetraloniae W.P.Teschner; Ophrys thesei P.Delforge; Ophrys truncata Dulac; Ophrys untchjii (M.Schulze) P.Delforge; Ophrys vanbruggeniana (J.Essink, L.Essink & Kreutz) P.Delforge; Orchis arachnites Scop.; Orchis fuciflora Crantz; Orchis holosericea Burm.f.

= Ophrys holosericea =

Species of plant in the orchid family

Ophrys holosericea, the late spider orchid, is a species of flowering plant in the family Orchidaceae, native to western and central Europe and the Mediterranean region. There has been considerable confusion about the identity of this species and the correct spelling of its name.

This species is pollinated by Eucera bees, deceived by the flower that mimics a female bee.

== Subtaxa ==
The following subtaxa are accepted:

- Ophrys holosericea subsp. andria (P.Delforge) Faurh. – Aegean Islands
- Ophrys holosericea subsp. apulica (O.Danesch & E.Danesch) Buttler – Eastern and southern Italy, southern Sicily, southern Croatia
- Ophrys holosericea subsp. biancae (Tod.) Faurh. & H.A.Pedersen – Sicily
- Ophrys holosericea subsp. candica (E.Nelson ex Soó) Renz & Taubenheim – Italy, Sicily, East Aegean Islands, Greece, Crete, Turkey
- Ophrys holosericea subsp. chestermanii J.J.Wood – Sardinia
- Ophrys holosericea nothosubsp. delfuocoi D'Alonzo & Perilli – Italy
- Ophrys holosericea subsp. elatior (Paulus) H.Baumann & Künkele – Eastern France, Switzerland, southwestern Germany
- Ophrys holosericea subsp. gracilis (Büel, O.Danesch & E.Danesch) O.Danesch & E.Danesch – Italy, Istria
- Ophrys holosericea subsp. holosericea – Entire range
- Ophrys holosericea subsp. lacaitae (Lojac.) W.Rossi – southern Italy, Sicily, Malta, Vis
- Ophrys holosericea subsp. oblita (Kreutz, Gügel & W.Hahn) ined. – Southern Greece, East Aegean Islands, Turkey, Lebanon/Syria, Palestine, Israel
- Ophrys holosericea subsp. oxyrrhynchos (Tod.) H.Sund. – southern Italy, Sicily, Malta
- Ophrys holosericea subsp. pallidiconi (Faurh.) ined. – South southwest Turkey
- Ophrys holosericea subsp. parvimaculata (O.Danesch & E.Danesch) O.Danesch & E.Danesch – South-central and southern Italy
- Ophrys holosericea nothosubsp. robertidarum D'Alonzo & Perilli – Italy
