= Ludowika Margaretha of Zweibrücken-Bitsch =

- Born: 19 July 1540; Ingwiller
- Died: 15 December 1569 (aged 29); Bouxwiller
- Buried: Ingwiller
- Noble family: House of Zweibrücken
- Spouse: Philip V, Count of Hanau-Lichtenberg
- Father: James of Zweibrücken-Bitsch
- Mother: Catherine of Honstein

Ludowika Margaretha of Zweibrücken-Bitsch (19 July 1540, Ingwiller – 15 December 1569, Bouxwiller), was the only child and heiress of Count James of Zweibrücken-Bitsch (born: 19 July 1510; died: 22 March 1570) by his wife Catherine, born Countess of Honstein zu Klettenberg. She was buried in Ingwiller.

== Inheritance ==
Her father, Count James of Zweibrücken-Bitsch (1510–1570), was the last male member of the House of Zweibrücken. His older brother, Simon V Wecker, had already died in 1540. Both James and Simon had only one daughter, Ludowika Margaretha and Amalie, respectively. A dispute over the inheritance ensued between their husbands, Philip V of Hanau-Lichtenberg and Philip I of Leiningen-Westerburg, respectively. The disputed territories include the Lordship of Bitsch, the district and castle of Lemberg, the Lordship of Ochsenstein and half of the Lordship of Lichtenberg (the other half was already held by the Counts of Hanau-Lichtenberg). Bitsch was formally a fief of the Duchy of Lorraine and could in theory only be inherited in the male line.

Initially, Philip V appeared successful. However, he immediately introduced the Lutheran faith in his newly gained territory and this made the powerful and Catholic Duke of Lorraine unhappy. The Duke terminated the fief and in July 1572 Lorraine troops occupied the county. Since Philip V's army was no match for Lorraine, he took his case to the Reichskammergericht. During the trial, Lorraine argued that, firstly, a significant part of the territory of Zweibrücken-Bitsch had been obtained in an exchange with Lorraine in 1302 and, secondly, the Counts of Leiningen had sold their hereditary claims to Lorraine in 1573.

In 1604, Hanau-Lichtenberg and Lorraine decided to settle out of court. In a treaty signed in 1606, it was agreed that Bitsch would revert to Lorraine and Hanau-Lichtenberg would retain Lemberg. This was reasonable, as it corresponded approximately to the religious realities of the territories.

== Marriage and issue ==
She married on 14 October 1560 in Bitsch with Count Philip V of Hanau-Lichtenberg (1541–1599). This was the first of his three marriages. They had the following children:

1. Johanna Sybille (born: 6 July 1564 (Note: She was baptized on 17 July 1564) in Lichtenberg; died on 24 March 1636 Runkel), married to Count William V of Wied-Runkel and Isenburg (died: 1612)
2. Philip (born: 7 October 1565 (Note: Baptized on 24 October 1565 in Bouxwiller) in Bouxwiller; died: 31 August 1572 in Strasbourg; buried in Neuwiller-lès-Saverne)
3. Albert (born: 22 November 1566 in Bouxwiller; died: 13 February 1577 in Haguenau; buried in Neuwiller)
4. Catherine (born: 30 January 1568 in Bouxwiller; died 6 August 1636), married Schenk Eberhard of Limpurg-Speckfeld (1560–1622)
5. Johann Reinhard I (born: 13 February 1569 in Bitsch, died: 19 November 1625 in Lichtenberg)
