= Ingwiller =

- Commune
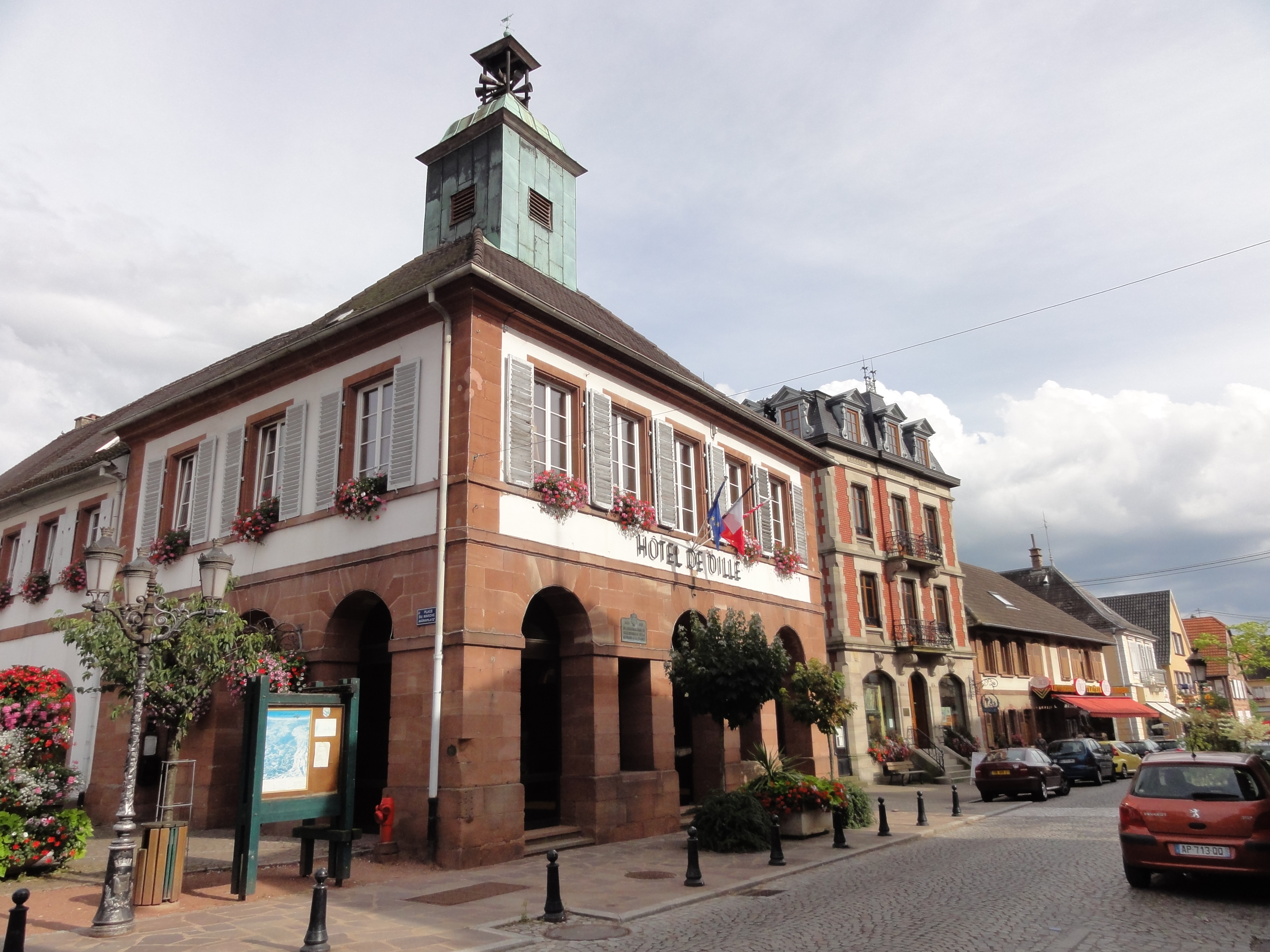
- The town hall in Ingwiller

- Coat of arms
- Location of Ingwiller
- Location within France Location within Grand Est
- Coordinates: 48°52′N 7°29′E
- Country: France
- Region: Grand Est
- Department: Bas-Rhin
- Arrondissement: Saverne
- Canton: Ingwiller

Government
  - Mayor (2020–2026): Hans Doeppen
- Area^{1}: 18.05 km^{2} (6.97 sq mi)
- Highest elevation: 371 m (1,217 ft)
- Lowest elevation: 185 m (607 ft)
- Population (2023): 3,995
  - Density: 221.3/km^{2} (573.2/sq mi)
- Time zone: UTC+01:00 (CET)
  - Summer (DST): UTC+02:00 (CEST)
- INSEE/Postal code: 67222 /67340
- ^{1} French Land Register data, which excludes lakes, ponds, glaciers > 1 km^{2} (0.386 sq mi or 247 acres) and river estuaries.

Ingwiller (French pronunciation: [iŋvilɛʁ]; German: Ingweiler) is a commune in the Bas-Rhin department in Grand Est in north-eastern France.

The commune lies within the North-Vosges natural park.

== History ==
The first known mention of Ingwiller dates from the year 742 a.C. as Ingoniunilare, 785 as Ilununilare, 1175 as Ingichwilre and 1178 in a bulla of the Pope Alexander III as Ingevilre.

On demand of Simon von Lichtenberg, the Emperor Louis IV the Bavarian imposed the village Ingveiler in the year 1345 to the town Ingveiler.

With the end of the Franco-Prussian War in the year 1870/71 Alsace-Lorraine became part of the German Empire. 166 inhabitants of the town Ingwiller took the option of the Treaty of Frankfurt (1871) to remain French citizens and therefore had to leave Alsace-Lorraine towards Southern France.

== Population ==
Historical population
Year	Pop.	±% p.a.
1968	3,257	—
1975	3,674	+1.74%
1982	3,900	+0.86%
1990	3,753	−0.48%
1999	3,847	+0.28%
2007	4,070	+0.71%
2012	4,242	+0.83%
2017	4,064	−0.85%
2023	3,995	−0.28%
Source: INSEE

== People ==
- Norbert Cohn (1904–1989): Jazz musician born in Ingwiller.

== See also ==
- Communes of the Bas-Rhin department
