= Bouxwiller, Bas-Rhin =

Bouxwiller Buxwiller
- Commune
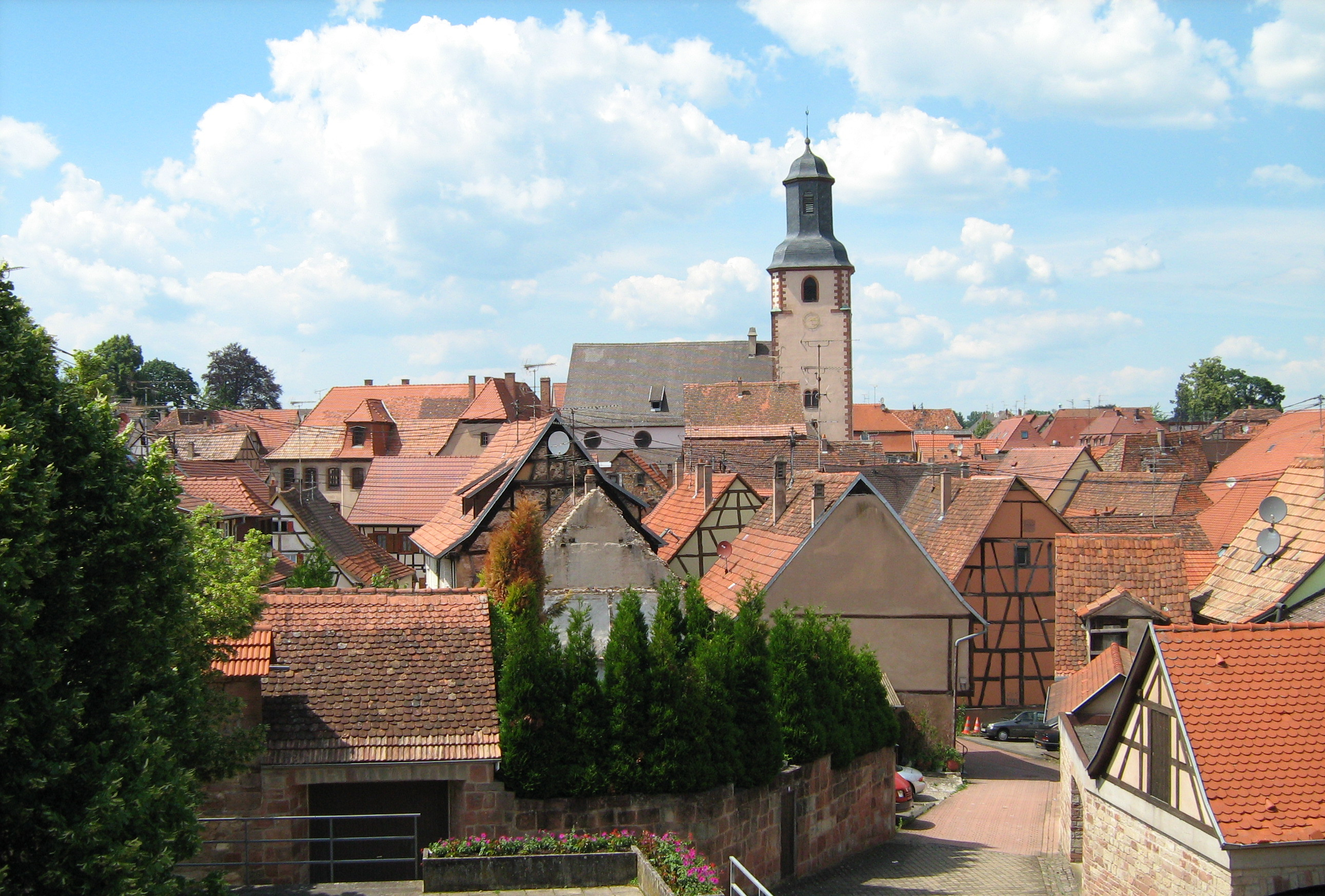
- The church and surroundings in Bouxwiller

- Coat of arms
- Location of Bouxwiller
- Location within France Location within Grand Est
- Coordinates: 48°49′34″N 7°29′01″E
- Country: France
- Region: Grand Est
- Department: Bas-Rhin
- Arrondissement: Saverne
- Canton: Bouxwiller

Government
  - Mayor (2020–2026): Patrick Michel
- Area^{1}: 25.59 km^{2} (9.88 sq mi)
- Highest elevation: 322 m (1,056 ft)
- Lowest elevation: 177 m (581 ft)
- Population (2023): 3,754
  - Density: 146.7/km^{2} (379.9/sq mi)
- Time zone: UTC+01:00 (CET)
  - Summer (DST): UTC+02:00 (CEST)
- INSEE/Postal code: 67061 /67330
- ^{1} French Land Register data, which excludes lakes, ponds, glaciers > 1 km^{2} (0.386 sq mi or 247 acres) and river estuaries.

Bouxwiller (French pronunciation: [buksvilɛʁ]; German: Buchsweiler, [ˈbʊksˌvaɪ̯lɐ]; Alemannic German: Buxwiller, or Busswiller) is a commune in the Bas-Rhin department, Alsace, Grand Est, northeastern France. Likely meaning "Bucco's land", Bouxwiller is the capital of the Bouxwiller canton and is located within the Saverne arrondissement about 34 kilometres (21 mi) northwest of Strasbourg.

The earliest known mention of Bouxwiller dates to 724 AD. In the 13th century, the town came into possession of the Lichtenberg family, who constructed the Château de Bouxwiller here in the early 14th century. Bouxwiller was the capital of the County of Hanau-Lichtenberg, and residence of the Counts of Hanau-Lichtenberg, throughout its existence from 1480 to 1736. The Château de Bouxwiller was pillaged during the French Revolution and its remnants were gone by the early 19th century. In 1973, the villages of Griesbach-le-Bastberg, Imbsheim, and Riedheim were incorporated into the commune of Bouxwiller.

== Toponymy ==
Puxuvilare is the earliest spelling of the town, as mentioned in 724. In 737, Buxwilari and Buxovillare were used. Eventually, Buchsweiler became the standard German spelling. The spelling of the town is Busswiller in Alsatian.

The current spelling of the town's name dates to the French Revolution. In 1792, the German spelling Buchsweiler—sometimes seen as Bouxweiler—was officially replaced with its French equivalent Bouxwiller, then Bouxviller in 1793. During the German annexation of Alsace from 1871 to 1918 and German annexation between 1940 and 1944, the town reverted to its German spelling Buchsweiler.

The name of the town is composed of two elements: Boux- and -willer. The suffix -willer is the French spelling of the German -weiler, which derives from the Medieval Old High German suffix -willer, which in turn is derived from the Low Latin word villare and means "agricultural land". The first element of the name, Boux-, is likely representative of the Germanic name Bucco, as toponyms incorporating the suffix -willer was typically combined with a personal name as the first element. The letter 'X' represents the letters 'ks', of which the 's' is the Saxon genitive that frequently appeared in toponyms in the region in the late Middle Ages. (Note: Other nearby towns incorporating the Saxon genitive include Erckartswiller, Monswiller, Eckartswiller, and Weiterswiller.) Thus, a probable meaning of the town's name is "Bucco's land". An alternative folk etymology of the town name is that the name is a combination of Buchs-, the German word for Buxus (boxwood), and -willer, thus meaning "land of boxwood". However, this origin is improbable considering the use of Puxuvilare in 724, since the Latin suffix -villare was not associated with vegetation.

== History ==
Tiles and pottery shards indicate the presence of Romans on Bastberg Hill, where the remains of a laconicum (Roman bath) were discovered in 1739. The earliest written mention of Bouxwiller was in 724, when Radolph and Eloïn gave the property of their respective mothers located in Puxuvilare to the Wissembourg Abbey.

Bouxwiller came into the possession of the knights of Lichtenberg around 1260. Rudolf I of Germany elevated Bouxwiller to the rank of city to attract the allegiance of the Lichtenberg family; this status was renewed by Albert I of Germany in 1301. This status allowed Bouxwiller to have a city wall and host a market, among other new sources of revenue. In 1312, the city was described as an oppidum, then meaning a fortified city. The Lichtenberg family built a moated castle in Bouxwiller—the Château de Bouxwiller—which was first mentioned in 1329, although it incorporated a chapel that was mentioned in 1315, when it hosted funeral services for John the First of Lichtenberg. The chapel also contained an epitaph and the tomb of John, Count of Werd and Landgrave of Lower Alsace, who died in 1376.

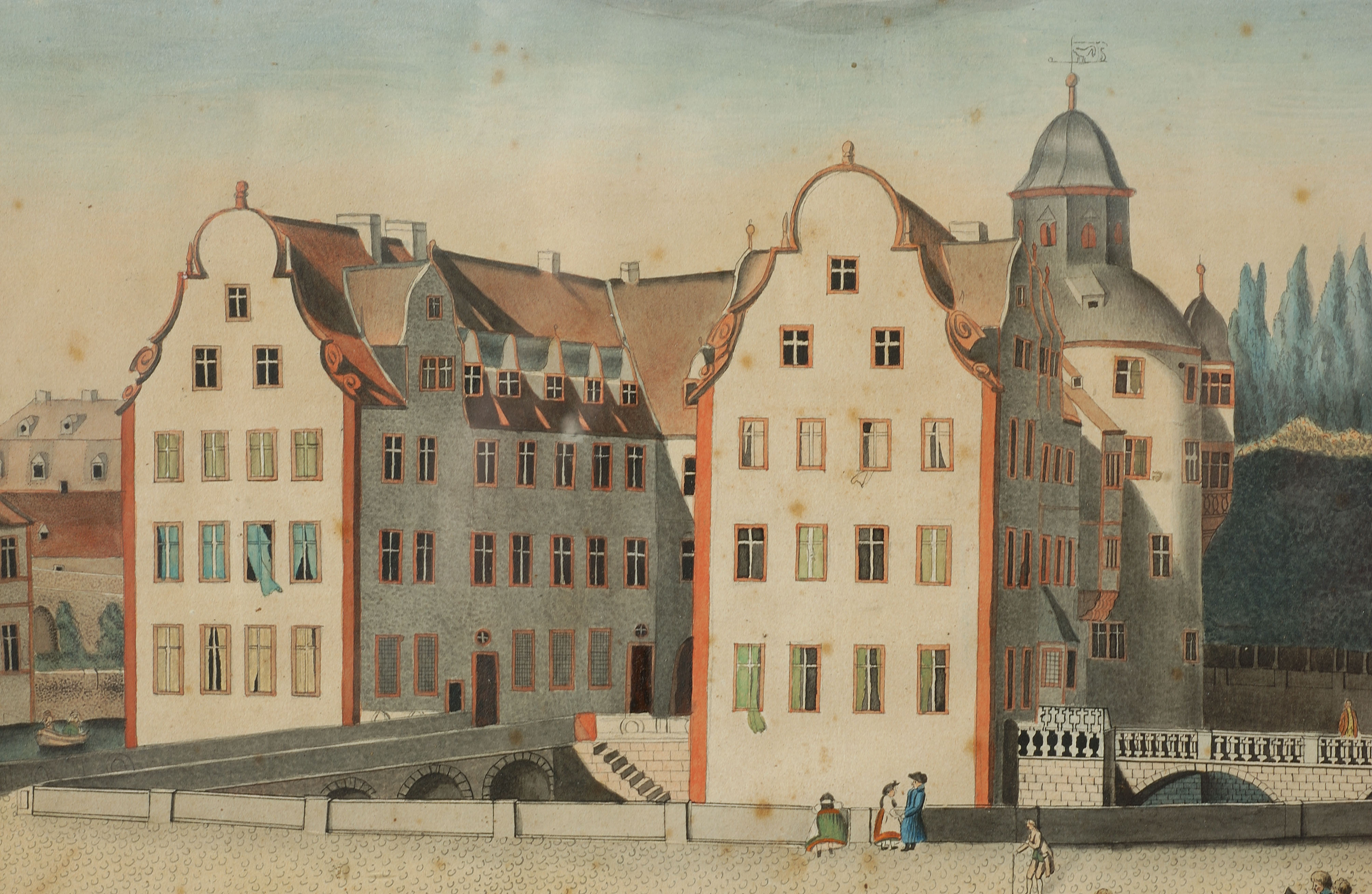
The Château de Bouxwiller in the late 17th century.

Count Jacob of Lichtenberg died in 1480 without issue, leaving his territory to be divided among his nieces. The Bailiwick of Bouxwiller was inherited by Anne of Lichtenberg and her husband Philipp I of Hanau-Babbenhausen (later Philipp I, Count of Hanau-Lichtenberg) to become a part of the County of Hanau-Lichtenberg. Bouxwiller was the capital of the County of Hanau-Lichtenberg and residence of the Counts of Hanau-Lichtenberg throughout its existence from 1480 to 1736. After being looted during the German Peasants' War, the castle was renovated in the mid-sixteenth century by Philipp IV of Hanau-Lichtenberg and expanded with two new wings and lavish gardens. In June 1683, French King Louis XIV and his son the Grand Dauphin made a stop in Bouxwiller and three years later, the city came under French control.

In 1736, the County of Hanau-Lichtenberg was transferred to Landgrave Louis IX of Hesse-Darmstadt, officially becoming a part of the Landgraviate of Hesse-Darmstadt. The Château de Bouxwiller became the residence of Louis IX's neglected wife Countess Caroline of Zweibrücken. During the French Revolution, the château was confiscated by the state and was pillaged in November 1793 by revolutionaries. The last remnants of the château were gone by the early 19th century. The medieval fortified city's two gates were razed in 1830.

In 1787, there were about 400–500 households in Bouxwiller, of which there were 40–50 Catholic families, 40 Jewish families, and over 300 families of the Augsburg Confession of the Lutheran Church. Mining brought prosperity to the commune in the nineteenth century, but ended in 1957.

In 1973, the villages of Griesbach-le-Bastberg, Imbsheim, and Riedheim were incorporated into the commune of Bouxwiller.

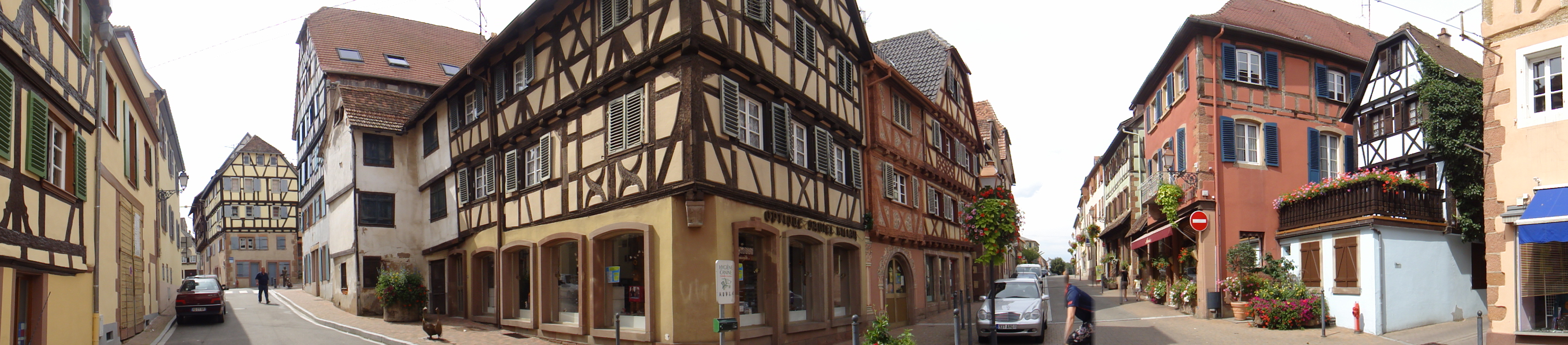
Panoramic view of the main road in the center of Bouxwiller

=== Judaism ===
The presence of a Jewish population in the city is documented in 1322. The Hanau-Lichtenberg administration was tolerant of the Jews, allowing the presence of a yeshiva (religious school) and beth din (Jewish court), which lasted from the 1760s until the French Revolution, and the establishment of two Jewish cemeteries in the commune in the sixteenth and seventeenth centuries. In 1725, a census of the Jews in the city counted 31 families and five widows. A large synagogue was built in Bouxwiller in 1844. It was defaced and damaged during the Second World War and the building now houses the Judeo-Alsatian Museum of Bouxwiller, dedicated to the history of Jews in Alsace.

== Geography ==
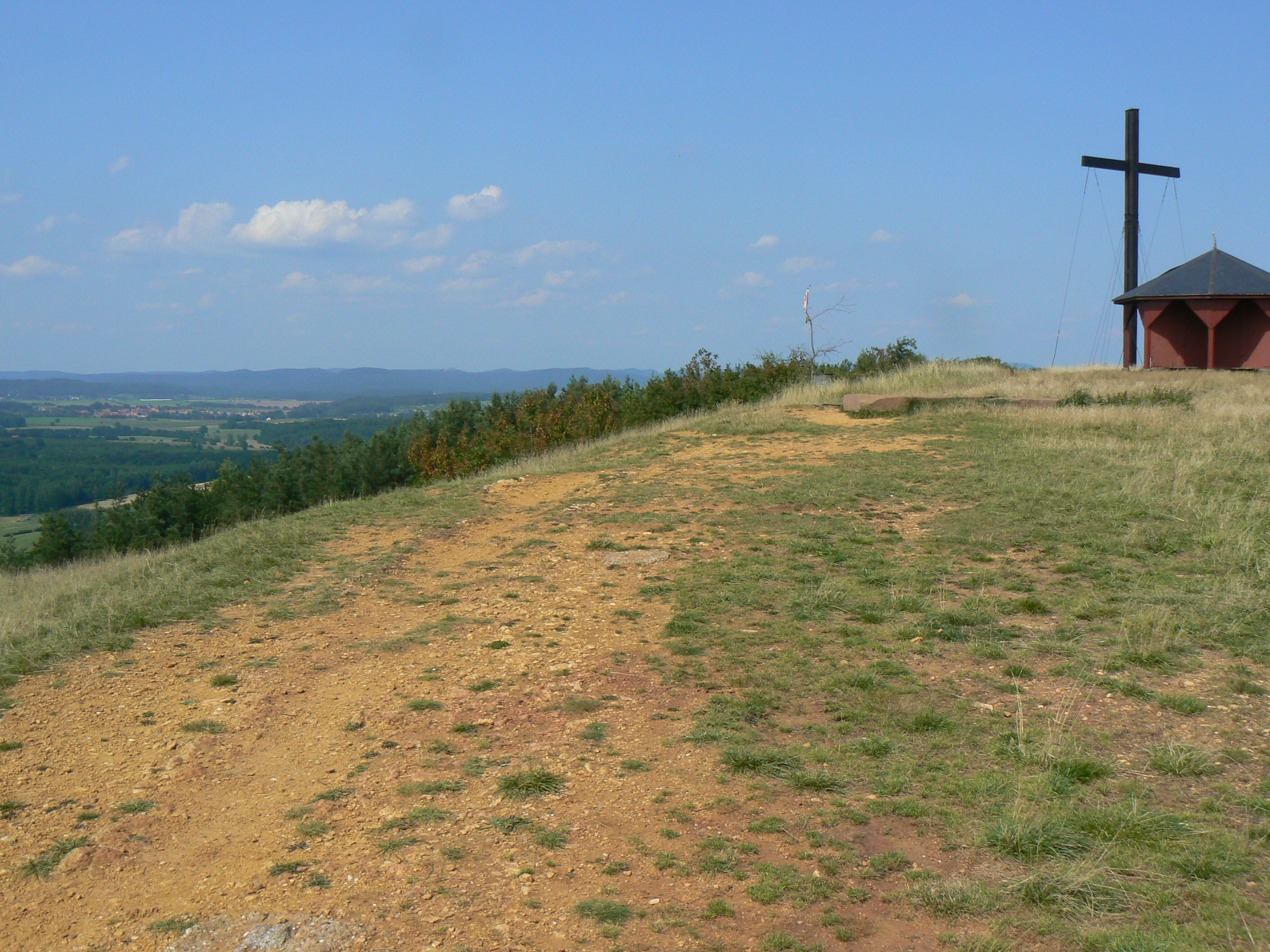
Summit of Bastberg, which lies within the commune

Bouxwiller is situated 34 kilometres (21 mi) northwest of Strasbourg. It is the capital of the Bouxwiller canton and is located within the Saverne arrondissement. It is bordered by the communes of Obersoultzbach, Niedersoultzbach, Uttwiller, Obermodern, Kirrwiller, Bosselshausen, Printzheim, Hattmatt, Neuwiller-lès-Saverne, and Weiterswiller.

Bouxwiller covers an area of 25.6 square kilometres (9.9 sq mi) at an altitude of 221 metres (725 ft). The commune is not crossed by any significant rivers, but contains several large streams that drain into the river Moder. Among the large streams are the Wappachgraben, Embsbaechel, Oberholtz, Griesbaechel, Schnurgraben, and the Wallbach.

Bouxwiller has a Cfb oceanic climate in the Köppen climate classification with an annual average temperature of 9.5 °C (49.1 °F) and annual average precipitation of 675 millimetres (26.6 in).

== Transport ==
A railway from Saverne was opened on 15 October 1877, with the railroad station in Bouxwiller opening the following year. The line was extended to Haguenau in 1881 and Ingwiller in 1889. Service between Bouxwiller and Ingwiller ended in 1953; the remaining line served passenger trains until 1970 and freight trains until 1989. The rail line has since been removed and its right-of-way now forms a cycle path, while the Bouxwiller train station has been remodeled and houses artisanal shops.

== Population ==
Historical population
| Year | Pop. | ±% p.a. |
|---|---|---|
| 1968 | 3,717 | — |
| 1975 | 3,706 | −0.04% |
| 1982 | 3,655 | −0.20% |
| 1990 | 3,693 | +0.13% |
| 1999 | 3,683 | −0.03% |
| 2007 | 3,968 | +0.94% |
| 2012 | 4,017 | +0.25% |
| 2017 | 3,963 | −0.27% |
| 2023 | 3,754 | −0.90% |
Source: INSEE

== See also ==
- Communes of the Bas-Rhin department
