= Lichtenberg, Bas-Rhin =

Lichtenberg
- Commune
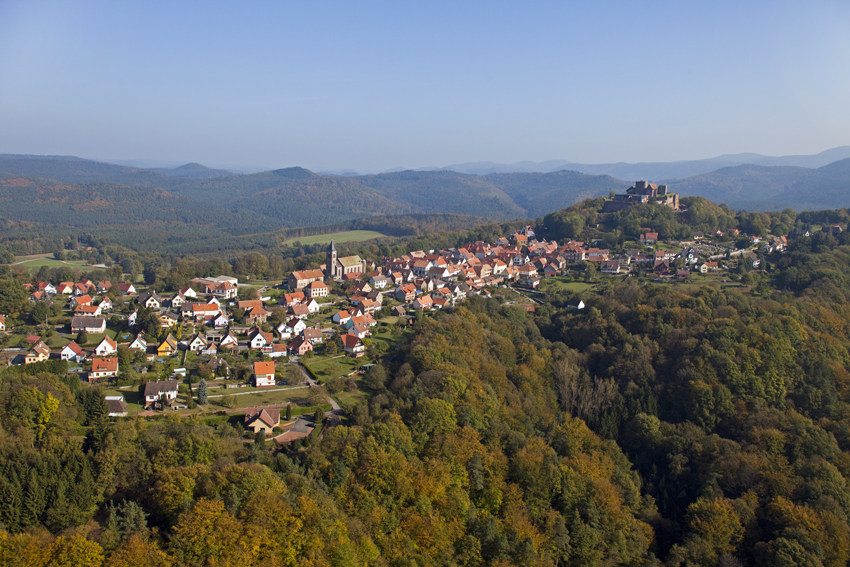
- A general view of Lichtenberg

- Coat of arms
- Location of Lichtenberg
- Location within France Location within Grand Est
- Coordinates: 48°55′18″N 7°28′53″E
- Country: France
- Region: Grand Est
- Department: Bas-Rhin
- Arrondissement: Saverne
- Canton: Ingwiller

Government
  - Mayor (2020–2026): Yves Klein
- Area^{1}: 12.12 km^{2} (4.68 sq mi)
- Highest elevation: 411 m (1,348 ft)
- Lowest elevation: 195 m (640 ft)
- Population (2023): 527
  - Density: 43.5/km^{2} (113/sq mi)
- Time zone: UTC+01:00 (CET)
  - Summer (DST): UTC+02:00 (CEST)
- INSEE/Postal code: 67265 /67340
- ^{1} French Land Register data, which excludes lakes, ponds, glaciers > 1 km^{2} (0.386 sq mi or 247 acres) and river estuaries.

Lichtenberg (French pronunciation: [liʃtənbɛʁɡ]) is a commune in the Bas-Rhin department in Grand Est in northeastern France.

The village forms a part of the Parc naturel régional des Vosges du Nord.

== Geography ==
Surrounding communes are Baerenthal in the neighbouring Moselle département to the northeast, Offwiller et Rothbach to the southeast, Ingwiller in the south, Wimmenau in the south-west and Reipertswiller to the northwest.

== Landmarks ==
- Château de Lichtenberg (Lichtenberg Castle)
- The Catholic Church in Lichtenberg contains the Stations of the Cross by Marie-Louis Sorg (Wikipedia France).

== See also ==
- Communes of the Bas-Rhin department
