= Eleonore of Fürstenberg =

- Born: 11 October 1523
- Died: 23 June 1544 (aged 20); Bouxwiller
- Buried: Abbey of St. Adelphi in Neuwiller-lès-Saverne
- Spouse: Philip IV, Count of Hanau-Lichtenberg
- Father: Frederick III of Fürstenberg
- Mother: Anna of Werdenberg-Heiligenberg

Eleonore of Fürstenberg (11 October 1523 – 23 June 1544 in Bouxwiller) was a daughter of Count Frederick III of Fürstenberg. Eleanore was a convinced Protestant. However, she had little influence on the change of denomination in Hanau-Lichtenberg, due to her death.

On 22 August 1538 in Heiligenberg, she married Count Philip IV of Hanau-Lichtenberg. They had the following children:

1. Amalie (23 February 1540 in Bouxwiller – 1 May 1540)
2. Philip V (21 February 1541, Bouxwiller, – 1599)
3. Anna Sibylle (16 May 1542 – after 1590), married to Louis of Fleckenstein-Dagstuhl
4. Johanna (23 May 1543 in Bouxwiller; – 5 December 1599 in Babenhausen, buried there), married to Wolfgang of Isenburg-Büdingen-Ronneburg, divorced in 1573
5. Eleanor (26 April 1544 in Bouxwiller; – 6 January 1585), married to Albert of Hohenlohe

She died consequent on childbirth in 1544, only 20 years old, and was buried in the Abbey of St. Adelphi in Neuwiller-lès-Saverne.
