= Zweibrücken-Bitsch =

County of the Holy Roman Empire

County of Zweibrücken-Bitsch Grafschaft Zweibrücken-Bitsch
- 1286/1302 – 1570
- Coat of arms

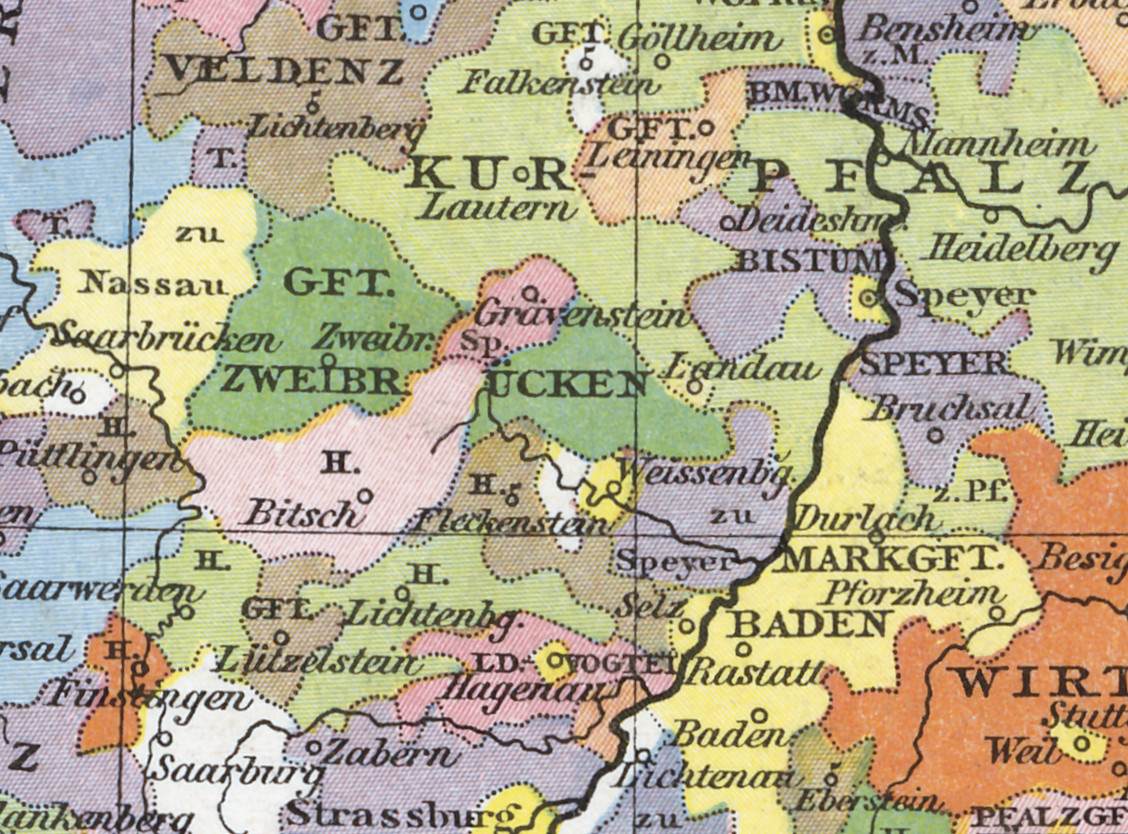
- Counties of Zweibrücken-Zweibrücken (dark green) and Zweibrücken-Bitsch (light pink) around 1400
- Status: State of the Holy Roman Empire
- Capital: Bitsch
- Language: German
- Religion: Roman Catholic
- Government: County
- Historical era: Middle Ages
  - Established: 1286–1302
  - Disestablished: 1570
Preceded by	Succeeded by
County of Zweibrücken; Duchy of Lorraine	Duchy of Lorraine; Hanau-Lichtenberg
- Today part of: Germany; France

The County of Zweibrücken-Bitsch (German: Grafschaft Zweibrücken-Bitsch, French: comté de Deux-Ponts-Bitche) was a territory of the Holy Roman Empire that was created between 1286 and 1302 from the eastern part of the County of Zweibrücken and the Barony of Bitche (German: Bitsch) in Lorraine. It existed until 1570, when it was divided amongst its heirs when the counts died out.

== History ==
When the land of Zweibrücken was divided amongst the sons of Count Henry II of Zweibrücken, the district (Amt) of Lemberg and Lemberg Castle went to the elder son, Eberhard I from 1286. His portion also included Morsberg, Linder and Saargemünd. In 1297 he swapped these three castles with Duke Frederick III of Lorraine and received in return the castle and lordship of Bitsch as a fief. This exchange of territory was further defined in 1302. From then on, Eberhard called himself the Count of Zweibrücken and Lord of Bitsch. Because he and his descendants bore the title count, the new territory was called the County of Zweibrücken-Bitsch.

Other lands were initially managed jointly by Eberhard I and his younger brother, Walram I, who had been given the Amt of Zweibrücken. These were not finally apportioned until 1333. Walram inherited Stauf Castle, Bergzabern, and the town and abbey of Hornbach. Eberhard received Thaleischweiler, Pirmasens, and part-ownership of the castles of Landeck and Lindelbronn. In the period that followed the counts of Bitsch succeeded in acquiring a few other properties, but only in the immediate vicinity. When their Zweibrücken cousins died out in 1394, they received parts of the inheritance, but not the County of Zweibrücken because the last count had sold his county in 1385 to the Electoral Palatinate.

In the 16th century, Count James succeeded for the last time in establishing a clear concentration of power in northern Alsace and the southern Palatinate. In 1559 he obtained the Barony of Ochsenstein because the cadet branch of Zweibrücken-Bitsch-Ochsenstein, that had existed since 1485, had died out. However, since James and his brother Simon V Wecker (died 1540) had each only produced a daughter, a dispute broke out in 1570 after James' death between the husbands of the two cousins, Count Philip I of Leiningen-Westerburg and Count Philip V of Hanau-Lichtenberg. Whilst Philip V was able to overpower Philip I, his immediate introduction of Lutheranism in the course of the Reformation made himself an enemy of the powerful Roman Catholic Duchy of Lorraine under Duke Charles III, who had the suzerainty of Bitsch. In July 1572 troops of Lorraine occupied the county. Because Philip V could not match Lorraine's military might, he sought legal redress.

During the subsequent trial before the Reichskammergericht, Lorraine was able to point both to the exchange agreement of 1302 as well as the fact that, in 1573, it had purchased the hereditary rights of the counts of Leiningen.

In 1604 there was a contractual agreement between Hanau-Lichtenberg and Lorraine, which resulted in the Amt of Lemberg being transferred to the County of Hanau-Lichtenberg and the Amt of Bitsch to the Duchy of Lorraine.

== List of the counts of Zweibrücken-Bitsch ==
- 13 May 1297 – 1321: Eberhard I, whose grandparents were Count Henry I and his wife Hedwig of Lorraine, daughter of Frederick of Bitsch.
- 1321–1355: Simon I, m. Agnes of Lichtenberg
- 1355–1400: John (Hanemann) I
- 1400–1418: John (Hanemann) II, initially ruled jointly with his brother Simon III Wecker (d. 1407)
- 1418–1474: Frederick, his brother Henry I married Cunigunde of Ochsenstein and founded the cadet branch of Zweibrücken-Bitsch-Ochsenstein
- 1474–1499: Simon IV Wecker, m. Elisabeth of Lichtenberg: b. 1444, d. 1495, daughter-heir
- 1499–1532: Reinhard, Lord of Lichtenberg and Bitsch, Count of Zweibrücken, m. Anna of Dhaun, daughter of John VI, Wild-Rhine Count of Dhaun and Kirburg (b. 1470; d. 25 December 1499) and Joanna of Salm; they had four children:
  - William (b. 8 December 1507)
  - Elizabeth, m. John Louis I of Sulz
  - James (b. 19 July 1510) m. Catharine of Honstein-Klettenberg
  - Joanna (b. 10 June 1517) m. Conrad V of Tübingen-Lichteneck
- 1532–1540: Simon V Wecker, only had a daughter, Amalia (1537–1577, m. 1551 Philip I of Leiningen-Westerburg); as a result followed by his brother
- 1540–1570: James (b. 19 July 1510, d. 24 March 1570 in Stürzelbronn), also had only a daughter, Ludovica Margareta of Zweibrücken-Bitsch (b. 1540; d. 1569), m. Count Philip V of Hanau-Lichtenberg

== Coat of arms ==
Blazon: Or, a lion rampant gules, armed and langued azure.

== See also ==
- Pays de Bitche
