= Margaret of Hanau-Münzenberg =

Countess Margaret
- Born: 6 April 1471
- Died: 5 September 1503 (aged 32); Worms
- Noble family: House of Hanau (by birth)
- Father: Philip I, Count of Hanau-Münzenberg
- Mother: Adriana of Nassau-Siegen

Countess Margaret of Hanau-Münzenberg (6 April 1471 – 5 September 1503 in Worms) was a daughter of Count Philip I of Hanau-Münzenberg and his wife, Countess Adriana of Nassau-Siegen.

Her family negotiated her entry into the Liebenau monastery as early as 1477, and she was accepted there as a nun.

Correspondence between her and her father has been preserved, which shows that she still took an interest in the affairs of her family after she entered the convent.

== Ancestors ==
Ancestors of Margaret of Hanau-Münzenberg

8. Reinhard II, Count of Hanau (1369-1451)
4. Reinhard III, Count of Hanau (1412-1452)
9. Catherine of Nassau-Beilstein (c. 1370-1459)
2. Philip I, Count of Hanau-Münzenberg (1449-1500)
10. Otto I, Count Palatine of Mosbach (1390-1461)
5. Countess Palatine Margaret of Mosbach (1432-1457)
11. Joanna of Bavaria-Landshut (1413-1444)
1. Margaret of Hanau-Münzenberg
12. Engelbert I of Nassau (c. 1380-1442)
6. John IV, Count of Nassau-Siegen (1410-1475)
13. Johanna van Polanen (1392–1445)
3. Adriana of Nassau-Siegen (1449-1477)
14. John II of Loon and Heinsberg (1381-1438)
7. Mary of Looz-Heinsberg (1424-1502)
15. Anna of Solms (d. 1433)
