= Margaret of Hanau =

15th-century German noble

- Born: 1452
- Died: 14 March 1467
- Noble family: House of Hanau
- Father: Reinhard III, Count of Hanau
- Mother: Countess Palatine Margaret of Mosbach

Margaret of Hanau (1452 – 14 March 1467) was the only daughter of Count Reinhard III of Hanau (1412–1452) and his wife Countess Palatine Margaret of Mosbach (1432–1457).

== Engagement ==
On 14 August 1459, at the age of seven, Margaret was engaged to Philip of Eppstein-Königstein. She received a dowry of 12000guilders, a considerable sum in those days. An explanation for this large sum may be that she was her parents' only daughter and, since both of her parents had already died, would not have to pay another dowry. The sum was reduced by 650 guilders, which the Eppstein family was supposed to earn as interest, and was to be paid from the revenues of the city of Butzbach.

However, Margaret died in 1467, and the marriage never happened.

== Ancestors ==
Ancestors of Margaret of Hanau

8. Ulrich IV, Lord of Hanau (1330/40–1380)
4. Reinhard II, Count of Hanau (1369–1451)
9. Elisabeth of Wertheim (died after 1380)
2. Reinhard III, Count of Hanau (1412–1452)
10. Henry II, Count of Nassau-Beilstein (d. 1415)
5. Catherine of Nassau-Beilstein (d. 1459)
11. Catherine of Randerode (before 1380 – 1415)
1. Margaret of Hanau
12. Rupert, King of Germany (1352–1410)
6. Otto I, Count Palatine of Mosbach (1390–1461)
13. Elisabeth of Nuremberg (1358–1411)
3. Countess Palatine Margaret of Mosbach (1432–1457)
14. Henry XVI, Duke of Bavaria (1386–1450)
7. Joanna of Bavaria (1413–1444)
15. Margaret of Austria (1395–1447)
