= Philipp I of Hanau-Lichtenberg =

Nobleman

Philipp I, Count of Hanau-Lichtenberg
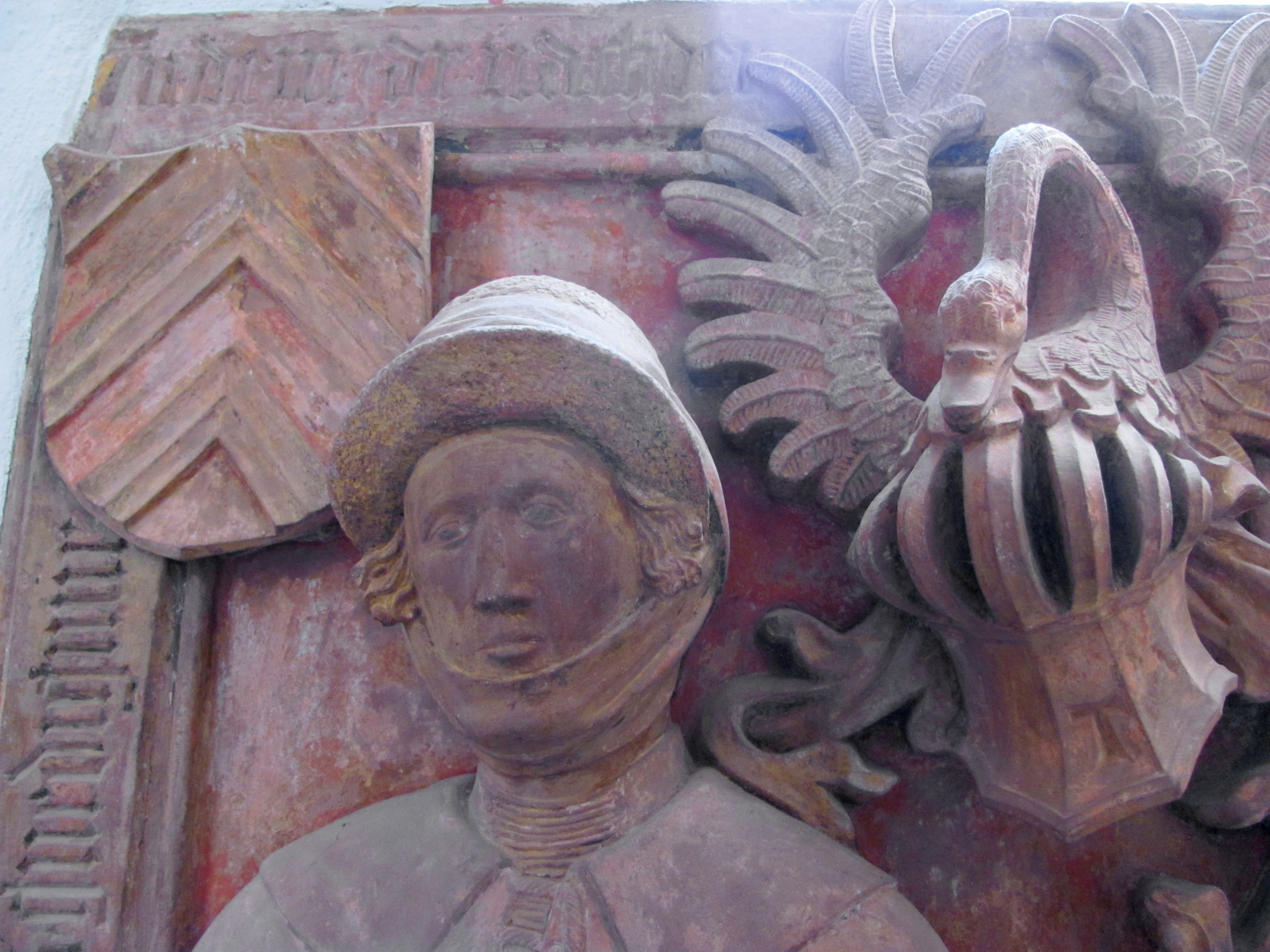
- Philipp I (the elder) of Hanau-Lichtenberg on his epitaph in the church of St Nikolaus in Babenhausen
- Born: 8 November 1417; Windecken Castle in Windecken, now part of Nidderau
- Died: 10 May 1480 (aged 62); Ingweiler, now called: Ingwiller
- Buried: St Nikolaus church in Babenhausen
- Noble family: House of Hanau
- Spouse: Anna of Lichtenberg
- Father: Reinhard II, Count of Hanau
- Mother: Katharina of Nassau-Beilstein

Philipp I, Count of Hanau-Lichtenberg (also known as Philipp the Elder; born: 8 November 1417 at Windecken Castle in Windecken, now part of Nidderau; died: 10 May 1480 in Ingweiler, now called: Ingwiller) was Count of Hanau. The county was divided between him and his nephew, Count Philipp I "the Younger". Philipp the Elder's part of the county was later called Hanau-Lichtenberg; Philipp the Younger's part is known as Hanau-Münzenberg.

== Life ==
=== The time before the division of the county ===
Philipp I was born on 8 November 1417 at Windecken Castle, as the son of Lord Reinhard II of Hanau, who was later raised to Count of Hanau, and his wife Katharina of Nassau-Beilstein. Two days later, he was baptized there. He godparents were Johann Trier, Komtur of the Teutonic Order in Frankfurt and Gertrude of Kronberg, the daughter of Frank X of Kronberg (1381–1423) and Gertrude of Hatzfeld (1381–1409), who was at the time married to her second husband Philipp of Franckenstein.

Originally, a career in the clergy had been planned for Philipp, as he was a younger son. For unknown reasons, this did not happen; instead he engaged in a military career. In 1448, he fought with the Duke of Cleves against the Archbishop of Cologne. His father died in 1451, and was succeeded by his eldest brother, Count Reinhard III.

=== Division of the county ===
==== Context of the division ====
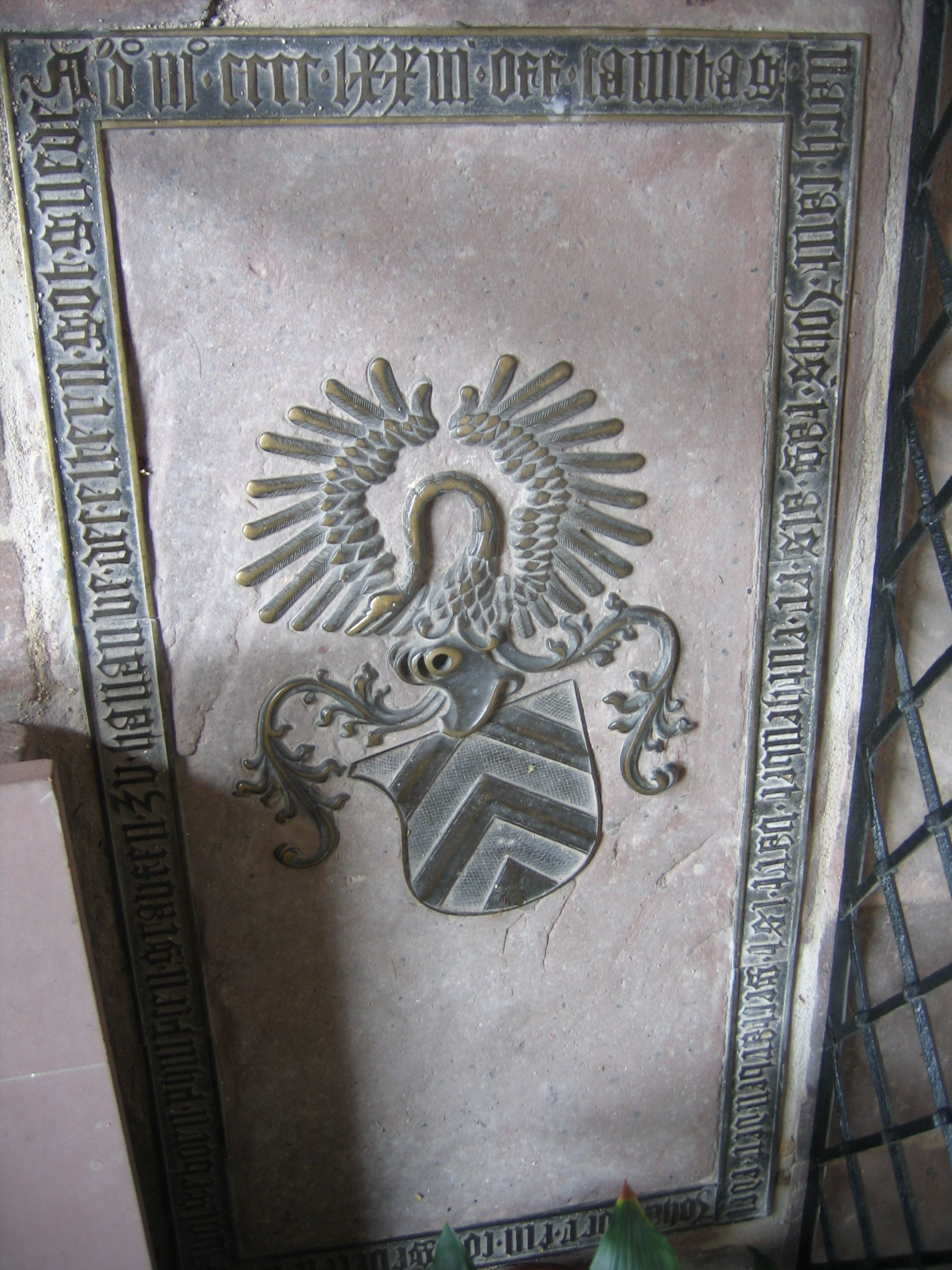
Gravestone of Johann of Hanau-Lichtenberg in the City Church in Babenhausen

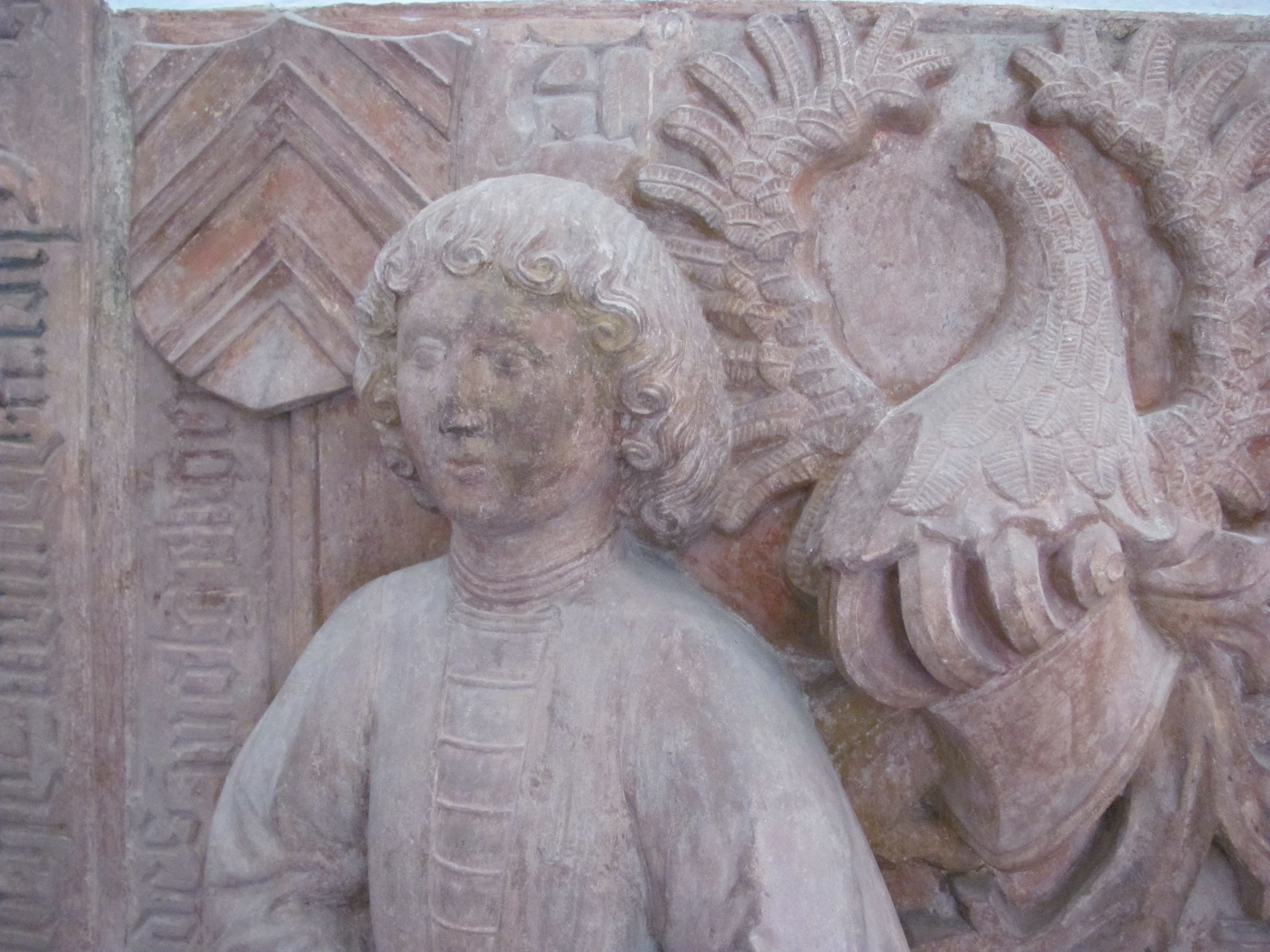
Count Johann of Hanau-Lichtenberg

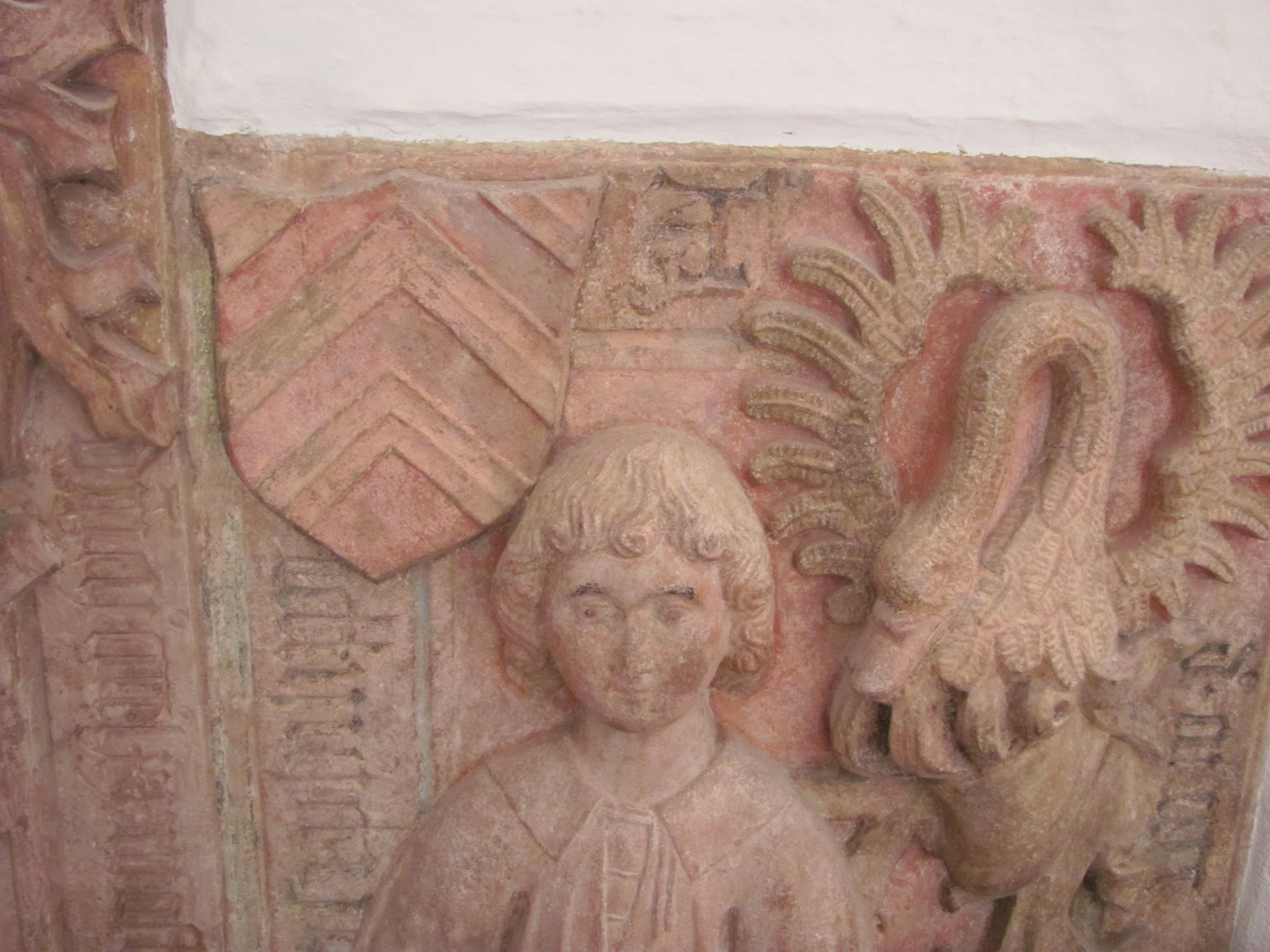
Count Dieter of Hanau-Lichtenberg

Count Reinhard III died in 1452, after reigning only a year. He was succeeded by his son Philipp "the Younger". At the time, Philipp the Younger was only four years old. This situation presented the Hanau family with a dilemma:

- They could obey the primogeniture rule, which had been observed in Hanau since 1375. This would mean hoping that Philipp the younger would live to an adult age, marry and have children, who would continue the dynasty. This would have the advantage that all of the family's possessions would remain in a single hand. It would entail the risk that the dynasty might die out, if Philipp the Younger were to die without a male heir.
- Alternatively, the family could ignore the primogeniture decision and allow the next agnate, Philipp the Elder, to marry. This would have the advantage of significantly increasing the probability that the dynasty continued to exist, but the disadvantage that the county would have to be divided. This model also called for urgent action, as Philipp the Elder was almost 40 years old, which was considered quite an advanced age in the 15th century.

==== Debating the division ====
The debate over the division of the county is relatively well documented. Two parties took shape in the country and its ruling family. Since Philipp the Younger was still a minor and his interests were represented by a guardian committee, initially consisting of his maternal grandfather, Count Palatine Otto I of Mosbach, his paternal grandmother Katharina of Nassau-Beilstein and his uncle Philipp the Elder. This committee acted as guardians and regents until the county was divided in 1458. Thereafter, Philipp the Elder acted as the sole guardian, until Philipp the Younger came of age in 1467.

Otto I was opposed to the division. He supported the interests of his daughter Margaret, the widow of Reinhard III and the mother of Philipp the Younger. He sought to position his grandson as the sole heir of the whole county.

The elderly Countess Dowager, Katharina of Nassau-Beilstein, was indifferent as to whether the line was continued via her grandson, Philipp the Younger, or via her second, son Philipp the Elder. She held that the danger of the House of Hanau dying out could be reduced by allowing Philipp the Elder to marry, since he had already proven his ability to procreate.

The supporters of Philipp the Elder organized a letter-writing campaign. Relatives of the Count and the most important organizations among their subjects — in particular the four cities in the county, Hanau, Windecken, Babenhausen and Steinau, and the associations of the Burgmannen of Babenhausen Castle and the imperial castle of Gelnhausen — as well as the vassals of the Counts of Hanau, all wrote to Otto I and requested that Philipp the Elder be allowed to marry. These letters are archived in the Hessian State Archive at Marburg.

==== Partition treaty of 1458 ====
When his daughter Margaret died in 1457, Count Palatine Otto I no longer had a reason to oppose the division. This tipped the balance in favour of dividing the country. A treaty to that effect was sealed in January 1458. Philipp the Elder received the part of the county south of the river Main, that is the district of Babenhausen and the Hanau share of Umstadt. So, the downside of a partition was mitigated by giving Philipp the Elder much less than half the county. Even so, Philipp the Elder was happy that he was finally allowed to marry, and did so later that year. In both parts, the primogeniture statute would continue to apply.

In retrospect, the decision turned out well, even if Philipp the Younger did not die childless, as had been feared. Philipp the Elder and his descendants managed to extend their county considerably through their marriages. When the last male-line descendant of Philipp the Younger died in 1642, the country was re-united under Friedrich Casimir, a descendant of Philipp the Elder.

==== Naming the parts ====
To distinguish between the two parts of the county, the part ruled by Philipp the Elder was called Hanau-Lichtenberg after he inherited Lichtenberg in 1480. The other part was officially named Hanau-Münzenberg in 1496. In the literature, the names Hanau-Lichterberg and Hanau-Münzenberg are used to distinguish the parts before these dates, even though, strictly speaking, that is an anachronism.

=== Reign ===
In 1458, Philipp the Elder took over the regency for his nephew, Philipp the Younger. This meant that the county was still effectively united, until Philipp the Younger came of age in 1467. Philipp the Elder then moved to Babenhausen, where he added to the existing castle as a residence for himself and his family. The east wing was built in 1460.

In this period he co-operated politically with Landgrave Heinrich III of Hesse, Elector Palatine Friedrich I, the counts of Henneberg and Elector Rupert of Cologne, a relative of the Elector Palatine. In 1468, he decreed that the primogeniture rules would be followed in his part of the county, meaning that all but one of his sons would have to choose an ecclesiastical career. Militarily, he fought on the side of Emperor Friedrich in a conflict between the Holy Roman Empire and France over Burgundy and in a military campaign against the Turks.

In 1480, the last Lord of Lichtenberg, Jakob of Lichtenberg, died childless. Philipp the Elder inherited one half of Lichtenberg, on behalf of his children, because his wife, Anna of Lichtenberg, who had been a niece of Jakob, had already died. The other half was inherited by Anna's sister, Elisabeth, who was married to Count Simon Wecker of Zweibrücken-Bitsch. By this inheritance, Philipp gained a substantial amount of territory, much of it in the Alsace, making the previously rather small Hanau-Lichtenberg almost as large as Hanau-Münzenberg. The Zimmern Chronicle comments in the inheritance: We can infer how much power and prestige the Barons of Lichterberg in the Alsace must have had, from the power and prestige their heirs, the houses of Bitsch and Hanau, have in our days.

=== Death ===
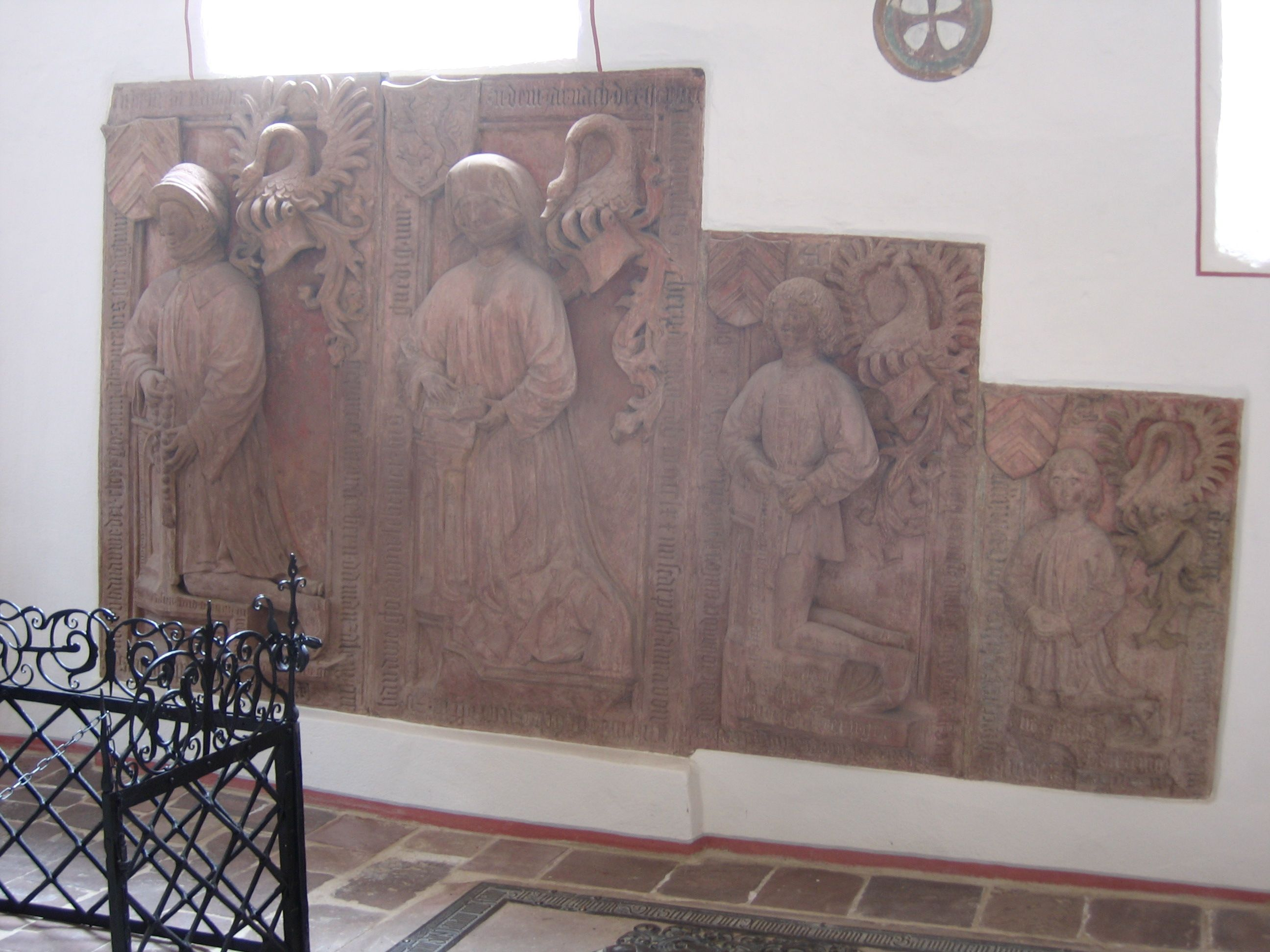
Epitaphs of Philipp the Elder of Hanau-Lichtenberg, his wife Anna of Lichtenberg, and sons Johann and Dieter in the City Church in Babenhausen

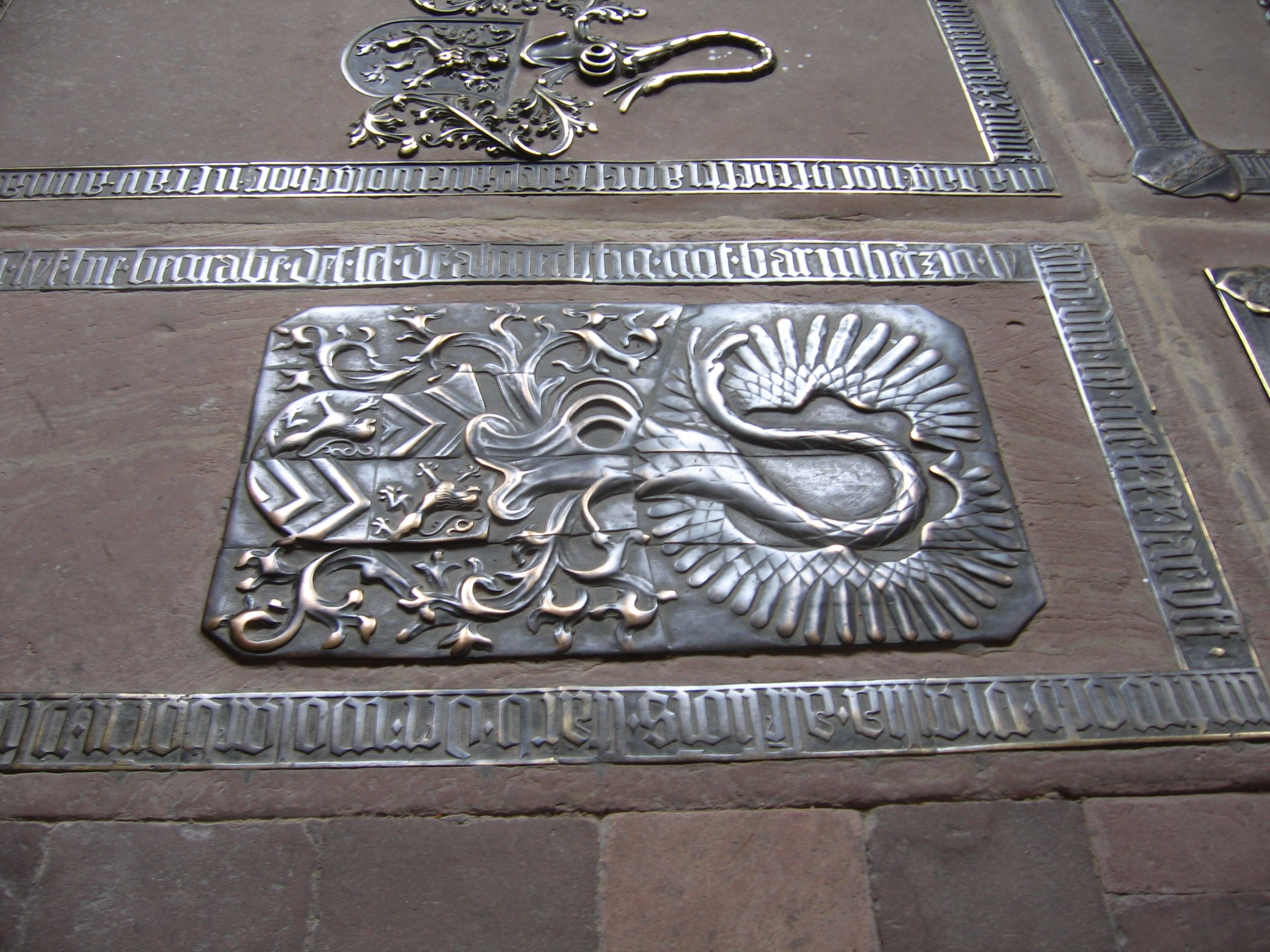
Grave stone of Philipp the Elder in the City Church in Babenhausen

Philipp the Elder died on 10 May 1480, just one day after the partition agreement over the inheritance with Count Simon Wecker of Zweibrücken-Bitsch had been signed. He was buried in the St. Nikolaus Church in Babenhausen. The red sandstone Epitaphs for him and his wife and two of his sons, who died in childhood, have been preserved.

== Marriage and issue ==
Philipp the Elder married on 6 September 1458 in Hanau with Anna of Lichtenberg, (25 October 1442 – 24 January 1474), heiress of the Lordship of Lichtenberg. They had the following children:

1. Johann (1460 – 4 September 1473), buried in the church of St Nikolaus in Babenhausen
2. Philipp II (31 May 1462 in Hanau, – 22 August 1504 in Babenhausen)
3. Margaret (15 May 1463, Lichtenberg – 26 May 1504), married to Count Adolf III of Nassau-Wiesbaden-Idstein
4. Ludwig (23 August 1464; 30 December 1484 in Trent)
5. Anna (d. 1491), a nun in the Marienborn Abbey
6. Dieter (about 1468 – 25 February 1473), buried in the Church of St. Nikolaus in Babenhausen
7. Albrecht (before 1474 – 24 June 1491), buried in Buchsweiler

Moreover, Philipp had at least one extramarital affair, with whom is not recorded, from which had these sons:

1. Johann of Hanau-Lichtenberg (dates unknown, mentioned in 1463), clergyman
2. Reinhard Hanauer (dates unknown, mentioned in 1512), provost at Neuweiler

== Ancestors ==
Ancestors of Philipp I of Hanau-Lichtenberg

8. Ulrich III, Lord of Hanau (1310–1370)
4. Ulrich IV, Lord of Hanau (c. 1330-1380)
9. Adelheid of Nassau-Wiesbaden (1327–1344)
2. Reinhard II, Count of Hanau (1369–1451)
10. Eberhard of Wertheim (d. 1373)
5. Elisabeth of Wertheim (1347–1378)
11. Katharina of Nuremberg-Hohenzollern (died after 1373)
1. Philipp I, Count of Hanau-Lichtenberg
12. Henry I, Count of Nassau-Beilstein (died between 1378 and 1380)
6. Henry II, Count of Nassau-Beilstein (d. 1412)
13. Meyna of Westerburg (d. 1388)
3. Katharina of Nassau-Beilstein (d. 1459)
14. Arnold of Randerode
7. Katharina of Randerode (d. 1415)

== Footnotes ==
Philipp I of Hanau-Lichtenberg House of Hanau Born: 8 November 1417 Died: 10 May 1480
Preceded by Philipp the Younger as Count of Hanau	Count of Hanau-Lichtenberg; 1458–1480	Succeeded by Philipp II
