= Lordship of Hanau =

Territory within the Holy Roman Empire

Lordship of Hanau Herrschaft Hanau
- 13th century – 1429
- Coat of arms
- Status: State of the Holy Roman Empire
- Capital: Hanau
- Government: Lordship
- Historical era: Late medieval
  - Established: 13th century
  - Disestablished: 1429
Preceded by	Succeeded by
Lordship of Hanau	County of Hanau
- Roman Catholic; ruled by Lords; language: German

The Lordship of Hanau was a territory within the Holy Roman Empire. In 1429 it was promoted to become a county.

== Geography ==
The territory of Hanau stretched along the northern bank of the Main river from east of Frankfurt am Main to east of Hanau. This area was called "Amt Buchen". From the 13th century it grew to include areas in the valley of the Kinzig, in the Spessart mountains, areas north of Frankfurt and south of the Main river around Babenhausen.

== The beginnings ==
In documents issued by the Archbishop of Mainz from 1122 two witnesses named after the castle of Wachenbuchen or simply "Buchen" (today part of the town of Maintal) are listed several times. They were Dammo of Buchen and his brother Siegebodo of Buchen. Dammo later called himself Dammo of Hanau. Hanau was a castle erected in a sharp bend of the Kinzig river a short distance before it flows into the Main river. The oldest mention of the castle dates to 1143. Dammo had a son who called himself Arnold of Hanau.

== Hanau family and its territory ==
Starting in 1166/68 a noble family arose who initially titled themselves after the castle of Dorfelden, but – starting in 1191 – they took on the title "of Hanau". The relationship between the families "of Buchen" and "of Dorfelden" is not clear. But since this time, the Genealogy of the "of Hanau" family is documented without interruption until the last male member died in 1736.

Starting with Reinhard I the territory of Hanau was enlarged by a series of profitable marriages and political moves usually executed in alliance with the archbishop and elector of Mainz. Reinhard I married Adelheid of Münzenberg, daughter of Ulrich II of Hagen-Münzenberg. The family of Hagen-Münzenberg was not a noble one but of ministerialis origine and immensely wealthy. Ulrich II of Hagen-Münzenberg had no male heirs but six daughters instead. So most of the inheritance was divided between five of the daughters (the sixth one became Abbess of a convent founded for her). The remaining inheritance, including the castle of Münzenberg, were co-owned by the daughters and their families. Hanau inherited land in and around Babenhausen and lands within the Wetterau. Babenhausen was the only larger part of the Lordship of Hanau located south of the Main river. Another part of the Münzenberg inheritance was the name "Ulrich": All subsequent heads of the house of Hanau bore this name.

Reinhard I took part in a war archbishop Werner von Eppstein of Mainz fought against the counts of Rieneck, their main stronghold being the Spessart mountains. The counts of Rieneck lost and had to cede territory as well as a daughter, Elisabeth of Rieneck-Rothefels, to Hanau. She was married to Ulrich I, son of Reinhard I. Through this connection the house of Hanau inherited again in 1290: namely the area around Steinau in the upper valley of the Kinzig river. In 1300 Ulrich I was furthermore appointed governor of Wetterau by king Albrecht I, an area north of Buchen and Hanau. He and his descendants retained this office up to his grandson Ulrich III. On 2 February 1303 the king promoted the settlement of Hanau which had developed in front of the Hanau castle to the level of a town and granted it the right to hold a market. During the 14th century a protective wall was built around the town.

In 1320 king Ludwig the Bavarian transferred the district of Bornheimerberg, an area to the north and north-west of Frankfurt to Ulrich II as a security for a loan. Due to the lack of money neither the king nor any of his successors was able to claim it back. But the king also gave it as a security to the city of Frankfurt. This led to a feud between the Lords of Hanau and the City of Frankfurt which was resolved only in the 15th century by dividing Bornheimer Berg between the two parties. In 1434 emperor Sigismund changed the part held by Hanau into a fief.

In 1377 the Lordship of Hanau inherited more Rieneck territory: the abbey and the district of Schlüchtern, the castle and district of Schwarzenfels and the district of Brandenstein - all located north-east of the existing Hanau territory - as well as the district of Lohrhaupten located south east of the Lordship of Hanau in the Spessart range.

== Late medieval ==
During the great plague, in 1349, the Jewish community in Hanau was massacred. Only two years later, in 1351, King Charles IV granted Ulrich III of Hanau the right to the protection taxes paid by the Jewish community within Hanau territory.

After some earlier regulations the house of Hanau granted itself a statute of primogeniture in 1375: Only the first born male inherited the Lordship. All other sons and all unmarried daughters had to join monasteries or convents. This statute was one of the earliest within Germany. It aimed to stabilize the territorial integrity of the Lordship of Hanau by avoiding subdivisions among heirs.

The "foreign" policy in the second half of the 14th century saw the Lords of Hanau – especially Ulrich III – in permanent conflict with the neighbouring city of Frankfurt. At one point Ulrich III was acting as representative of the emperor in the city and had laid claim to the imperial forest to the south of the city as well as the northern city districts of Bornheimerberg and Bockenheim. The city of Frankfurt, using its financial power by granting the emperor a large credit, managed to have Ulrich III removed as imperial representative and to take over the forest. The Lordship of Hanau kept most of area north of Frankfurt but never had another opportunity to take over Frankfurt itself again.

== Becoming Counts ==
Hanau remained an ally of the emperors. As a reward in 1429 emperor Sigismund granted Reinhard II of Hanau the title of a count. From this time on the Lordship of Hanau is called the County of Hanau.

== Literature ==
- Reinhard Dietrich: Die Landesverfassung in dem Hanauischen. Hanau 1996. ISBN 3-9801933-6-5 = Hanauer Geschichtsblätter 34
- Ernst Julius Zimmermann: Hanau Stadt und Land. Kulturgeschichte und Chronik einer fränkisch-wetterauischen Stadt und ehemaligen Grafschaft. Mit besonderer Berücksichtigung der älteren Zeit. Hanau 1919. Reprint: Hanau 1978, ISBN 3-87627-243-2.
