= Philipp I of Hanau-Münzenberg =

Nobleman

Philipp I, Count of Hanau-Münzenberg
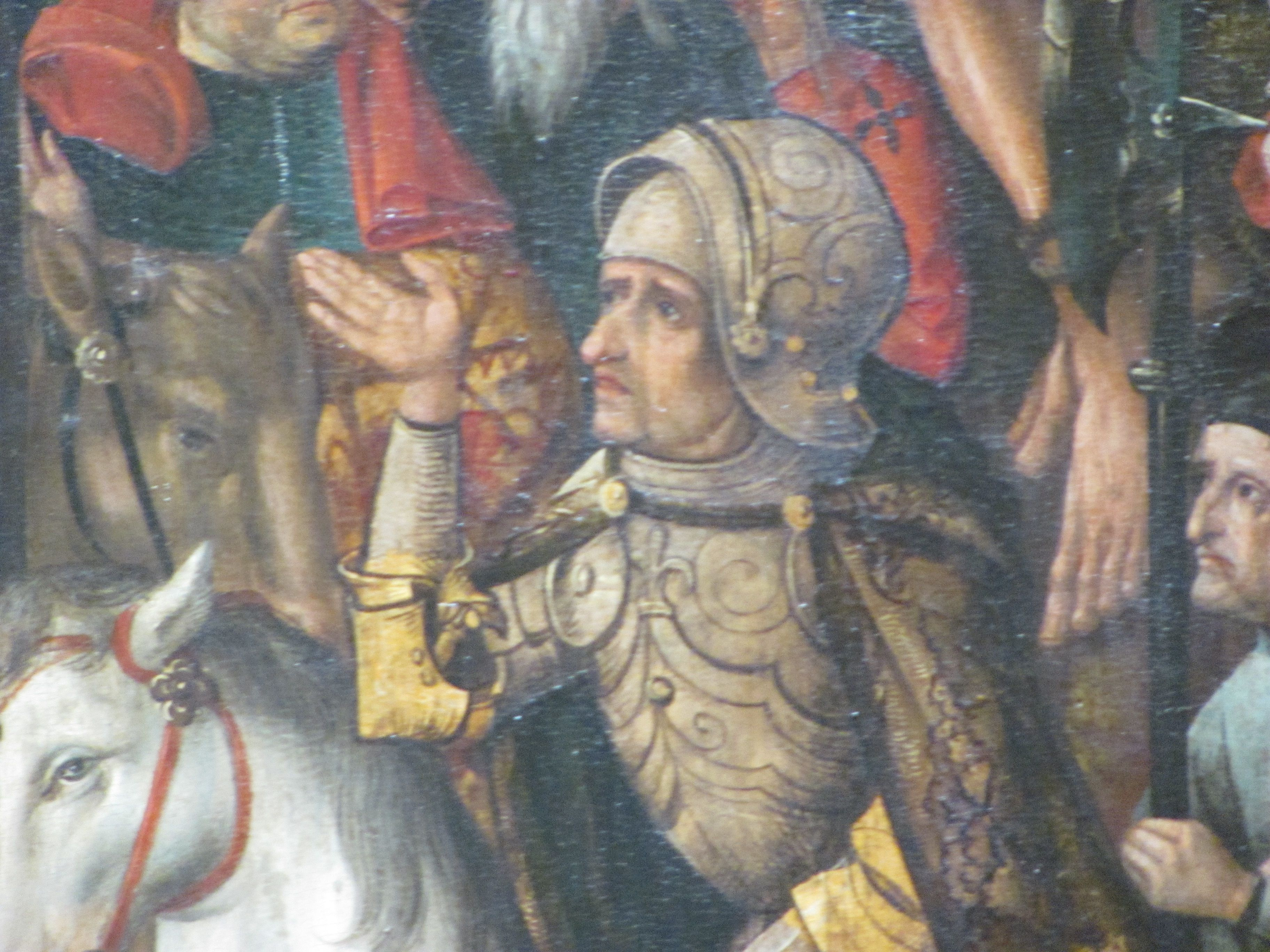
- Count Philipp I "the Younger" of Hanau, on the altar piece in Wörth am Main
- Born: 20 September 1449; Windecken, now part of Nidderau
- Died: 26 August 1500 (aged 50)
- Noble family: House of Hanau
- Spouses: Adriana of Nassau-Siegen; Margarete Weißkirchner
- Father: Reinhard III, Count of Hanau
- Mother: Countess Palatine Margaret of Mosbach

Count Philipp I of Hanau-Münzenberg, nicknamed Philipp the Younger, (20 September 1449, at Windecken Castle – 26 August 1500) was a son of Count Reinhard III of Hanau and Countess Palatine Margaret of Mosbach. He was the Count of Hanau from 1452 to 1458. The county was then divided between him and his uncle Philipp the Elder. Philipp the Younger received Hanau-Münzenberg and ruled there from 1458 until his death.

== Childhood ==
Philipp I was born at Windecken Castle (now in Nidderau) and was baptized in the local church. His godparents were

- Reinhard of Cleves, or, according to another tradition, Reinhard of Kleen, dean of Mainz
- Kuno of Beldersheim, abbot of the monastery in Seligenstadt, and
- Katharina of Kronberg, née of Isenburg, wife of Frank XII of Kronberg (1414–1490).

In 1452, his father, Reinhard III, died after a reign lasting only ten months. Philipp was at this time only four years old, which is why a guardianship had to be set up for him. From 1452 until the county was divided in 1458, the regency was exercised by a council, consisting of his maternal grandfather Count Palatine Otto I of Mosbach, his paternal grandmother, Katharina of Nassau-Beilstein, and his only uncle, Philipp the Elder. From 1458 to 1467, Philipp the Elder was the sole guardian and regent. In 1467, Philipp the Younger came of age.

Not much else is known about his childhood.

== Division of the county ==
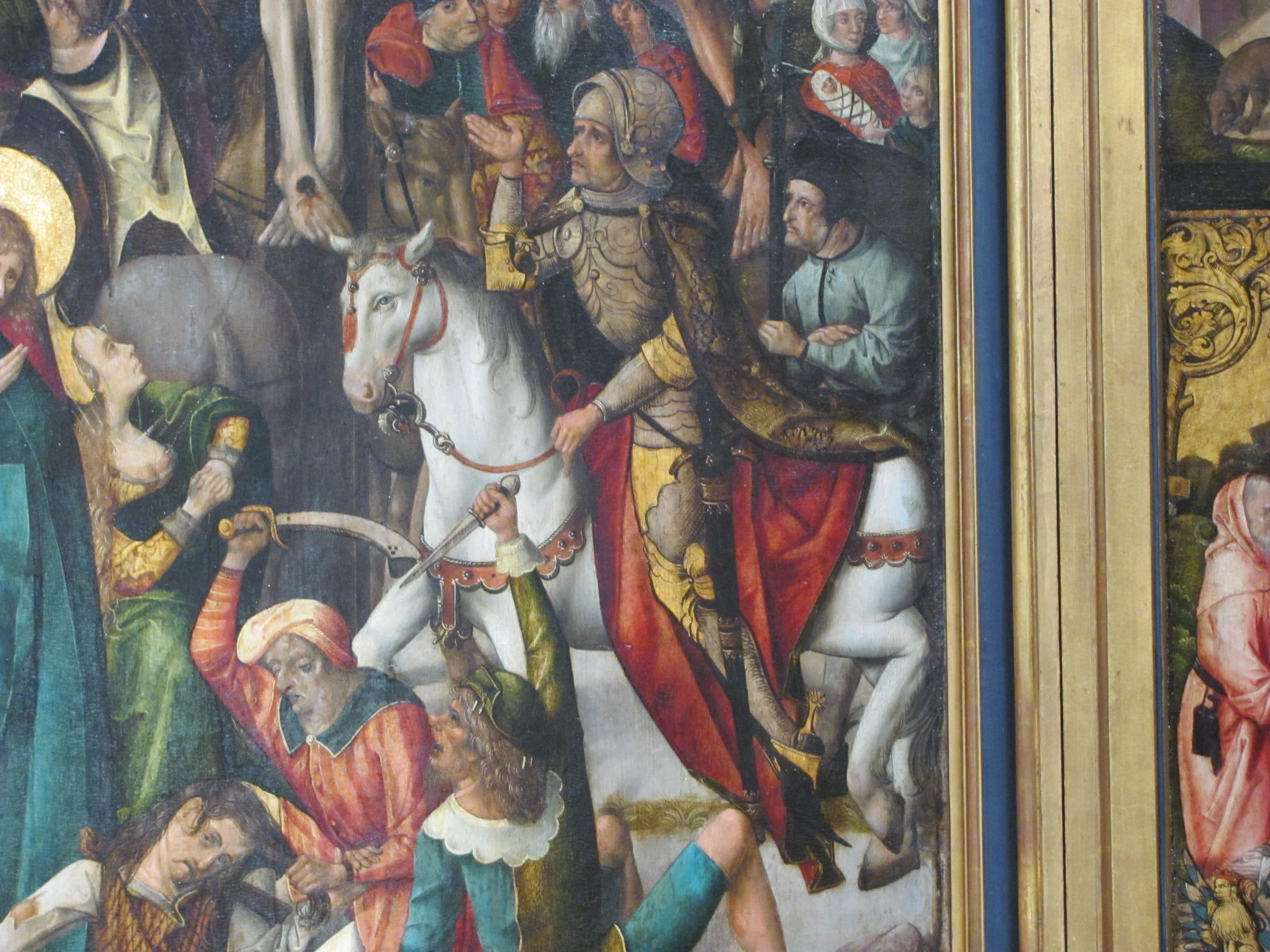
Count Philipp I the Younger of Hanau, shown as Roman captain in the crucifixion scene on the altar at Wörth am Main

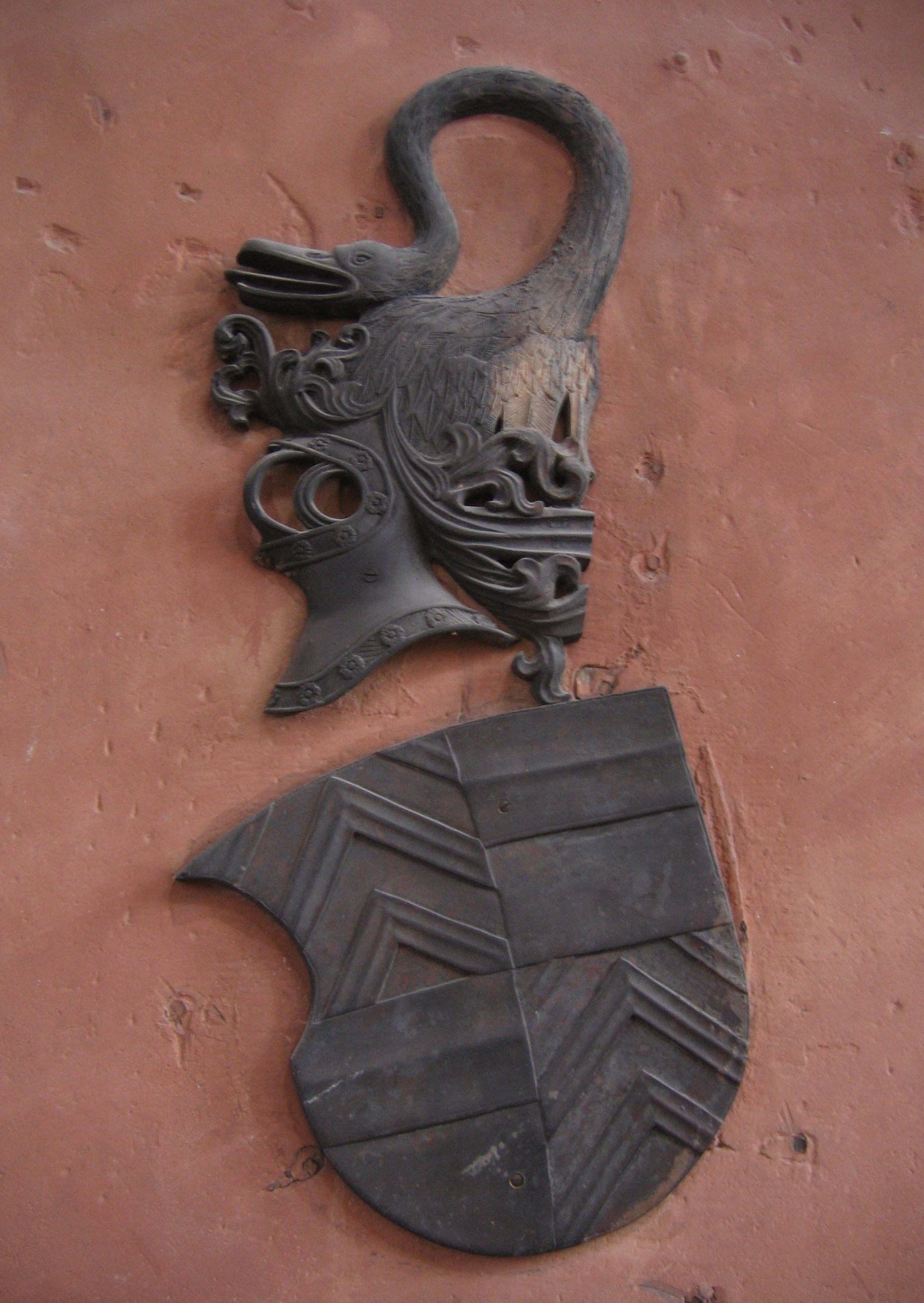
Coat of arms of Count Philipp I on his grave stone in the St. Mary's Church in Hanau

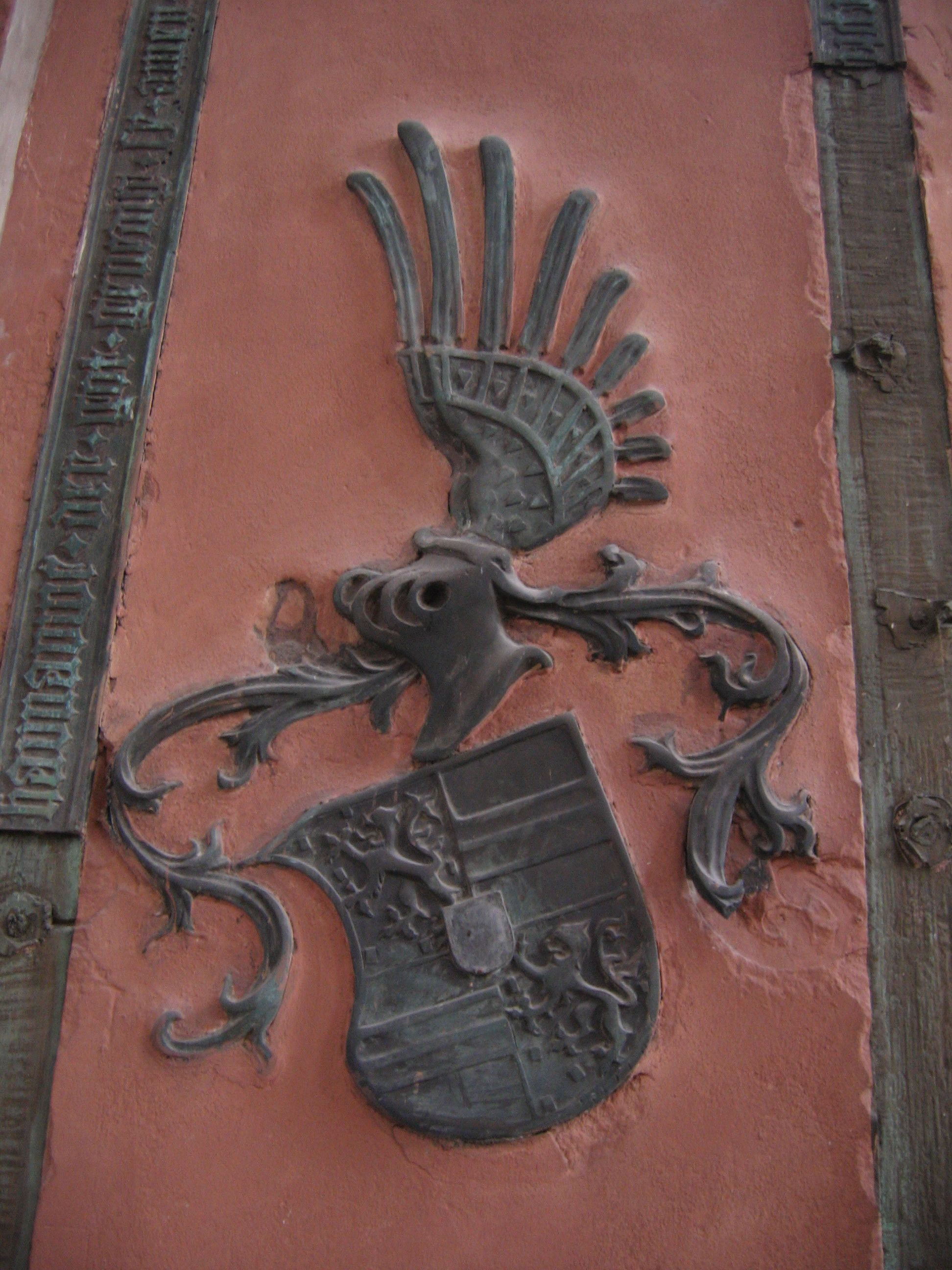
Coat of arms of Adriana of Nassau-Siegen on her gravestone in the St Mary's Church in Hanau

=== Context of the division ===
At the time of his accession Philipp the Younger was only four years old. This situation presented the Hanau family with a dilemma:

- They could obey the primogeniture rule, which had been observed in Hanau since 1375. This would mean hoping that Philipp the younger would live to an adult age, marry and have children, who would continue the dynasty. This would have the advantage that all of the family's possessions would remain in a single hand. It would entail the risk that the dynasty might die out, if Philipp the Younger were to die without a male heir.
- Alternatively, the family could ignore the primogeniture decision and allowed the next agnate, Philipp the Elder, to marry. This would have the advantage of significantly increasing the probability that the dynasty continued to exist, but the disadvantage that the county would have to be divided. This model also called for urgent action, as Philipp the Elder was almost 40 years old, which was considered quite an advanced age in the 15th century.

=== Debating the division ===
The debate over the division of the county is relatively well documented. Two parties took shape in the country and its ruling family.

Otto I, co-regent for Philipp the Younger, was opposed to the division. He supported the interests of his daughter Margaret, the widow of Reinhard III and the mother of Philipp the Younger. He sought to position his grandson as the sole heir of the whole county.

The elderly Countess Dowager, Katharina of Nassau-Beilstein, was indifferent as to whether the line was continued via her grandson, Philipp the Younger, or via her second, son Philipp the Elder. She held that the danger of the House of Hanau dying out could be reduced by allowing Philipp the Elder to marry, since he had already proven his ability to procreate.

The supporters of Philipp the Elder organized a letter-writing campaign. Relatives of the Count and the most important organizations among their subjects — in particular the four cities in the county, Hanau, Windecken, Babenhausen and Steinau, and the associations of the Burgmannen of Babenhausen Castle and the Palatinate of Gelnhausen — as well as the vassals of the Counts of Hanau, all wrote to Otto I and requested that Philipp the Elder be allowed to marry. These letters are archived in the Hessian State Archive at Marburg.

=== Partition treaty of 1458 ===
When his daughter Margaret died in 1457, Count Palatine Otto I no longer had a reason to oppose the division. This tipped the balance in favour of dividing the country. A treaty to that effect was sealed in January 1458. Philipp the Elder received the part of the county south of the river Main, that is, the district of Babenhausen and the Hanau share of Umstadt. So, the downside of a partition was mitigated by giving Philipp the Elder much less than half the county. Even so, Philipp the Elder was happy that he was finally allowed to marry, and did so later that year. In both parts, the primogeniture statute would continue to apply.

In retrospect, the decision turned out well, even if Philipp the Younger did not die childless, as had been feared. Philipp the Elder and his descendants managed to extend their county considerably through their marriages. When the last male-line descendant of Philipp the Younger died in 1642, the country was re-united under Friedrich Casimir, a descendant of Philipp the Elder.

=== Naming the parts ===
To distinguish between the two parts of the county, the part ruled by Philipp the Elder was called Hanau-Lichtenberg after he inherited Lichtenberg in 1480. The other part was officially named Hanau-Münzenberg in 1496. In the literature, the names Hanau-Lichtenberg and Hanau-Münzenberg are used to distinguish the parts before these dates, even though, strictly speaking, that is an anachronism. One should say Hanau-Babenhausen when referring to Philipp's the Elder's possessions before 1480.

== Journeys to Jerusalem ==
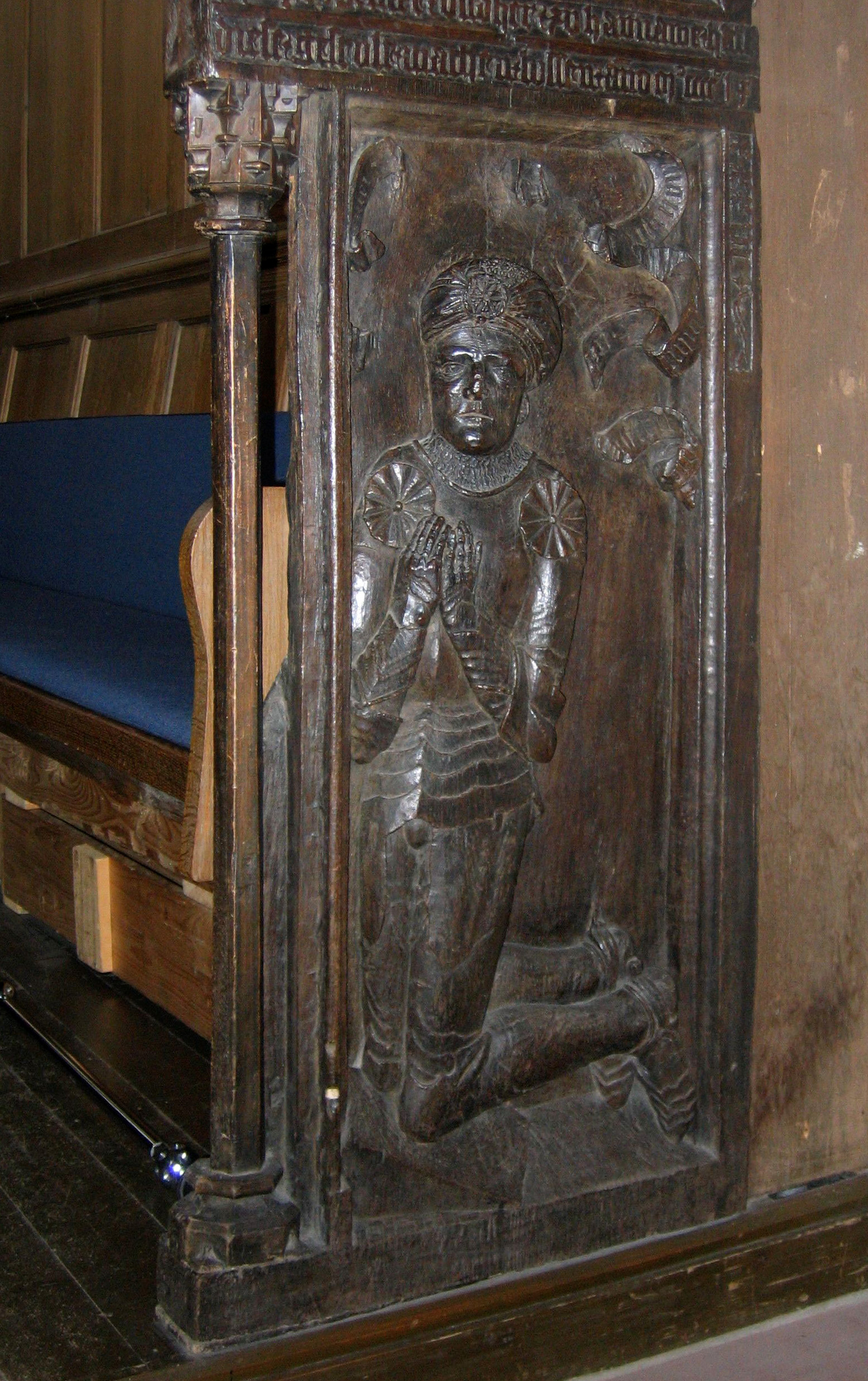
Count Philipp I the Younger of Hanau, depicted on a choir stall in the St. Mary's Church in Hanau

In 1484, Philipp went on a pilgrimage to Jerusalem. On 10 June 1484, he sailed from Venice and he landed in Jaffa on 18 July 1484. From there, he went to Jerusalem, which he left again on 10 August 1484. He travelled to Cyprus and arrived back in Venice on 30 November, and at the end of January, he was back in Hanau. He wrote an account of the journey, which, however, largely consists of an exhaustive list of holy sites he visited and the indulgences he acquired. A second trip to the Holy Land took place in 1491, when he accompanied Wilhelm I, Landgrave of Hesse.

== Reign ==
=== Territorial policy ===
During the reign of Philipp the Younger, Hanau-Münzenberg made significant territorial gains: In 1470, Praunheim was acquired, in 1476 a share in the district of Ortenberg, in 1473 or 1484 Fechenheim and in 1487 Homburg. A compromise was reached with the City of Frankfurt, temporarily in 1453 and definitively in 1481, about a division of the district of Bornheimerberg, which almost completely surrounded the city in the north. A treaty with the Count of Isenburg settled the dispute about Dreieich. Philipp was often involved in feuds, which he sought to settle amicably if at all possible. In this respect, the imperial Ewiger Landfriede of 1495 brought him great relief.

=== Imperial politics ===
Philipp loved to travel. He often visited the Palatine courts at Heidelberg and Mosbach and the city of Mainz. He visited Brabant in 1469 and the Diet of Regensburg in 1471. In 1474, he accompanied Emperor Frederick III to Frankfurt and Linz. In 1474 and 1475, he participated with a contingent of troops on the side of Emperor Frederick III in the relief of the city of Neuss, which was being besieged by Charles the Bold. In 1480, he visited the Emperor at Nuremberg and in 1491 he visited the Duke of Lorraine. In 1494, he accompanied the King of the Romans and later Emperor Maximilian I to Mainz, Speyer and Worms.

=== Churches and cultural policies ===
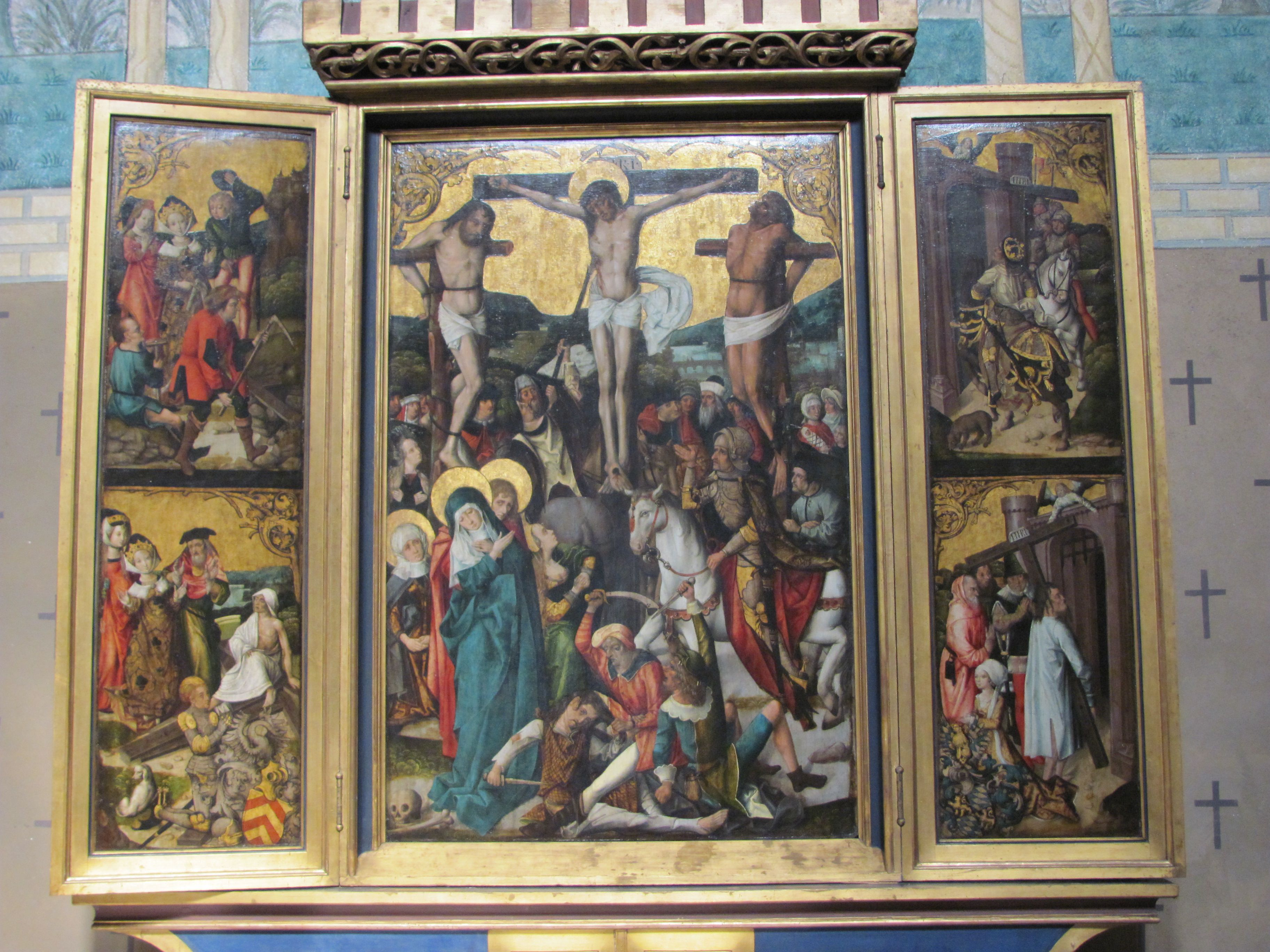
The altar piece in Wörth am Main

Philipp the Younger was deeply connected to the late medieval piety. He donated generously to religious institutions; he made two pilgrimages to the Holy Land and he collected relics. Philipp was deeply moved by these pilgrimages.

He purchased the entire collection of relics from the monastery at Seligenstadt when it was in financial distress, including the head of St. Lawrence. The archbishop of Mainz, however, objected to this transaction and Philipp had to return the relics to the monastery. As compensation, he received the villages of Nauheim, Eschersheim and Ginnheim from the monastery.

He made several additions and expansions to the St. Mary's church in Hanau:

- From 1485, a Gothic choir was constructed
- The chapel dedicated to St. Lawrence (now the vestry) was decorated with frescoes depicting the martyrdom of St. Lawrence and other saints.
- Some pieces of art have been preserved. The most prominent of these is a triptych now held in the St. Nikolaus church in Wörth am Main. Philipp is known to have commissioned other altar pieces, which have not been preserved. Philipp also commissioned the woodcarving on the choir stalls and the stained glass windows in the choir.

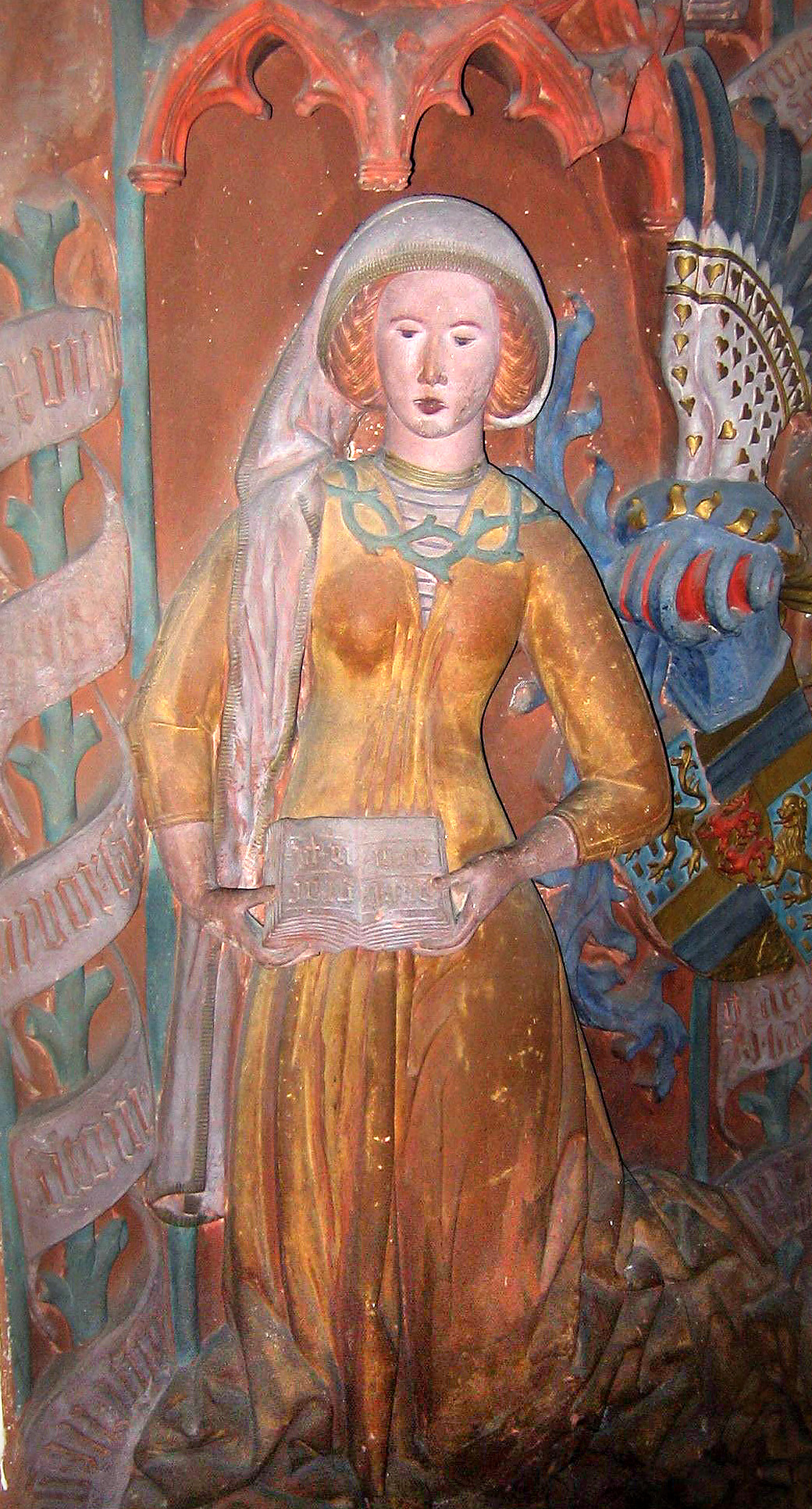
Phillip first wife Adriana of Nassau-Siegen

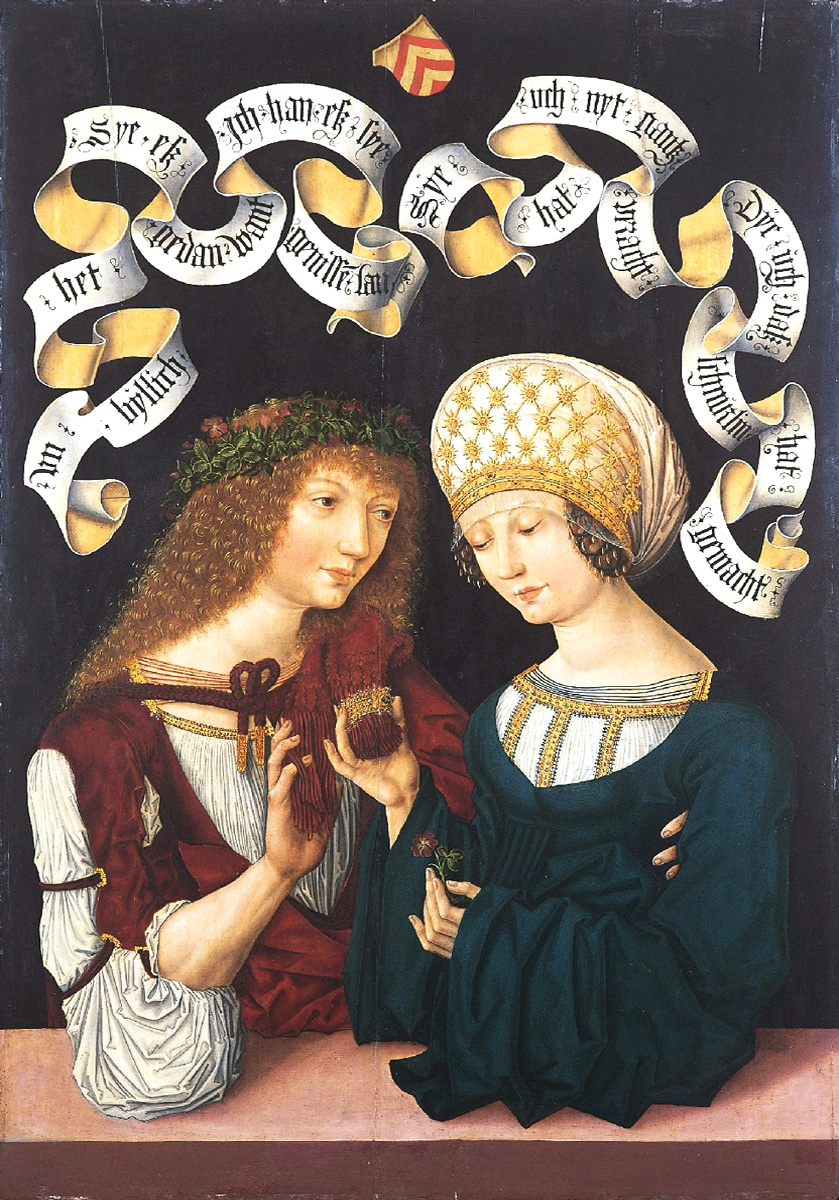
The Gotha lovers, probably Count Philipp the Younger and Margaret Weißkirchner

Philipp also commissioned the Gotha Lovers. This painting probably depicts him and his mistress, Margaret Weißkirchner.

These works of art are of an excellent quality and are nearly the only works of art that have survived from medieval Hanau.

Erasmus Hasefus, Philipp's trumpeter, founded in 1468 a chapel in the Bulau Forest, dedicated to St. Wolfgang. A small Servite monastery developed around this chapel.

== Marriage and issue ==
=== Marriage ===
As early as 1460, Philipp the Younger was engaged with a daughter of Count Ludwig II of Isenburg-Büdingen. She was either Anna of Isenburg or her sister Elisabeth. This engagement was later dissolved, against a compensation payment of 2690 guilders.

Philipp the Younger than married on 12 September 1468 with Countess Adriana of Nassau-Siegen (7 February 1449 – 15 January 1477), the daughter of Count John IV of Nassau-Siegen. They had six children:

1. A daughter, born on 4 April 1469, died shortly after birth.
2. Adriana (1470–1524), married in 1490 with Count Philipp of Solms-Lich (1468–1544).
3. Margaret (1471–1503), a nun at Liebenau monastery.
4. Reinhard IV (1473–1512), Count of Hanau-Münzenberg.
5. Anna (15 March 1474 – 21 March 1475).
6. Maria (4 March 1475 – 18 May 1476).

=== Mistress ===
After the death of his wife Philipp the Younger lived together with Margarete Weißkirchner. He could not marry her, because she was a commoner. Cohabiting was apparently accepted universally. He appeared with her in public. The most representative testimony is probably the first large-scale double portrait in art history, the so-called Gotha Lovers. Their relationship is exceptionally well documented. The couple had the following children:

1. Elsa of Hanau, married around 1508 with Heinrich Rabe.
2. Johann of Hanau-Münzenberg, a priest in Ober-Roden.
3. Anne of Hanau, married in 1517 with Dietz Reuter, a publican at Ortenberg.

These children were not entitled to inherit the county, because they did not belong to the high nobility. Nevertheless, Philipp and Margareta mentioned them in their will and their step-brother, arranged favorable marriages for his step-sisters and a well donated church-position for his step-brother.

Philipp the Younger also appears to have had a pre-marital affair with a Gutte from Reifenberg, who was the maidservant of the priest of Hochstadt and Reinhard IV.

== Death ==
Philipp the younger died on 26 August 1500 and was buried in the Church of St. Mary in Hanau; 214 clergyman were present at his funeral.

== Assessment ==
History has not always dealt very carefully with Philipp. The Protestant scholars of the 18th Century objected to his late medieval piety, fixated on indulgences, relics and good works. The civil-military historians of the 19th Century disliked his thoughtful approach to balancing the many feuds in which he was involved, and the bourgeois morality of the 19th Century objected to his relationship with Margarete Weißkirchner.

The modern view is that his reign should be considered as a positive one for his county and his subjects. The St. Mary's Church, the "Gotha Lovers" and the "Wörth altar piece" are the most outstanding testimonies of the cultural achievements under his government, and have remained remarkable works of art. He is now considered to be among the more important members of the House of Hanau, on a par with Ulrich III, Reinhard II and Philipp Ludwig II.

== Ancestors ==
Ancestors of Philipp I of Hanau-Münzenberg

8. Ulrich IV, Lord of Hanau (1330/40-1380)
4. Reinhard II, Count of Hanau (1369–1451)
9. Elisabeth of Wertheim (died after 1380)
2. Reinhard III, Count of Hanau (1412–1452)
10. Henry II, Count of Nassau-Beilstein (d. 1415)
5. Katharina of Nassau-Beilstein (d. 1459)
11. Katharina of Randerode (before 1380 – 1415)
1. Philipp I, Count of Hanau-Münzenberg
12. Rupert, King of Germany (1352–1410)
6. Otto I, Count Palatine of Mosbach (1390–1461)
13. Elisabeth of Nuremberg (1358–1411)
3. Countess Palatine Margaret of Mosbach (1432–1457)
14. Heinrich XVI, Duke of Bavaria (1386–1450)
7. Joanna of Bavaria (1413–1444)
15. Margarete of Austria (1395-1447)

== Footnotes ==
Philipp I of Hanau-Münzenberg House of Hanau Born: 20 September 1449 Died: 26 August 1500
Preceded by Reinhard III	Count of Hanau; 1452–1458	Succeeded by himself as Count of Hanau-Münzenberg
Preceded by Reinhard III	Count of Hanau; 1452–1458	Succeeded by Philipp the Elder as Count of Hanau-Lichtenberg
New division	Count of Hanau-Münzenberg; 1458–1500	Succeeded by Reinhard IV
