= The Lovers (Master of the Housebook) =

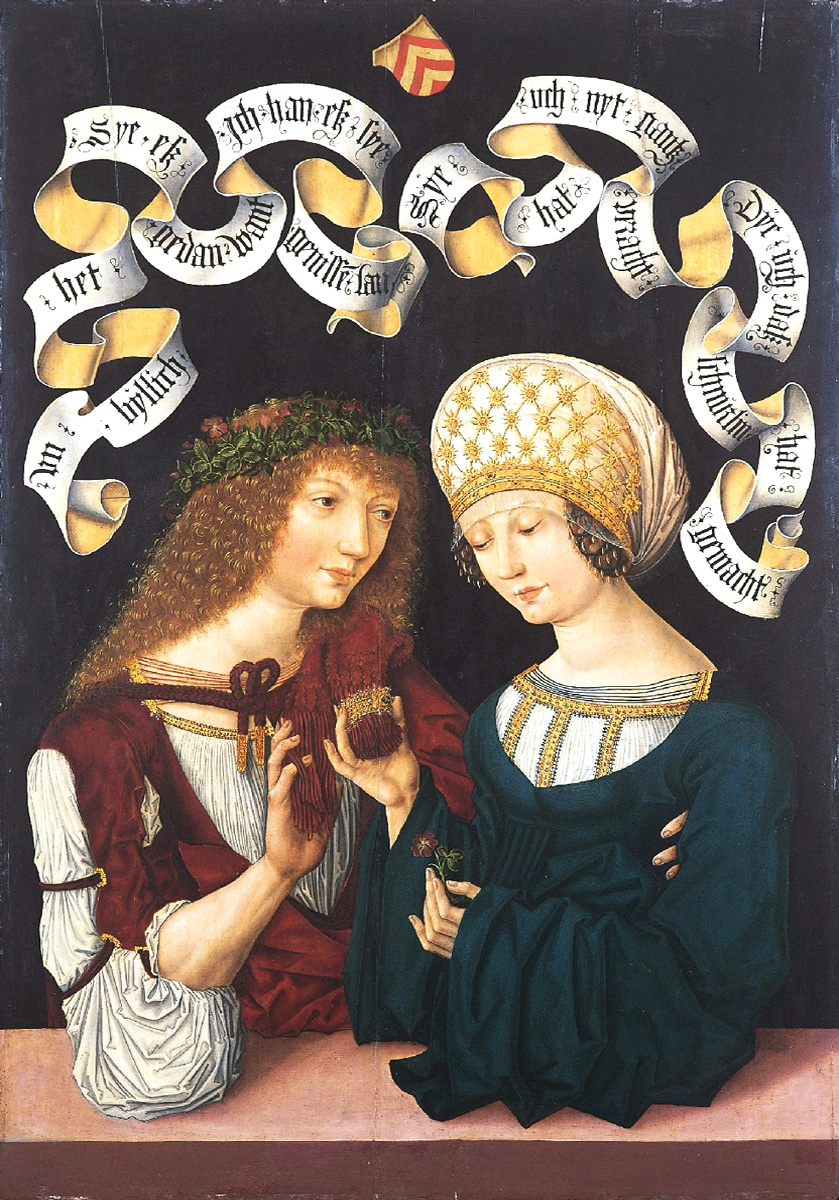

The Lovers (German - Liebespaar) or The Gotha Lovers (Gothaer Liebespaar) is a c.1480 oil on panel painting attributed to the Master of the Housebook (drawing hand Ib). It is the first German large-format double portrait panel painting that does not depict a religious or liturgical scene. A painting with a similar composition and a corresponding text reference from Mainz is now lost but is preserved through a copy in the late 16th century family register of the Eisenberg family.

It has been in Gotha since at least 1854 and has hung in the Ducal Museum Gotha since its reopening in October 2013. After a 1997 restoration it was displayed at the Castle Museum in Friedenstein Palace and an exhibition in 1998 entitled "Jahreszeiten der Gefühle. Das Gothaer Liebespaar und die Minne im Spätmittelalter" ("Season of Emotions. The Gotha Lovers and Love in the Late Middle Ages") largely adopted art historian Daniel Hess' identification of the subjects as Philipp I, Count of Hanau-Münzenberg and Margarete Weißkirchner (with whom Phillipp lived after his wife Adriana's death) and his theory that it was commissioned on the occasion of his first pilgrimage to the Holy Land in 1484–1485. Objections to that identification have recently been raised on historical grounds.

== Description ==
Measuring 118 by 82.5 cm, it shows two people lovingly leaning towards each other under two scrolls or banners (which act as 'speech bubbles') and the coat of arms of the County of Hanau-Münzenberg or (if the yellow is accepted as degraded varnish) the Lords of Eppstein. The man wears a wreath of roses in his long hair as a sign of love and the woman holds a hedge rose in her left hand, whilst she carefully reaches for the red bundle of strings bound in gold in the middle of the picture. That bundle or string is mentioned on the banners. At that time such a string was worn on clothing as a symbol of fidelity (in this case the end of the man's gugel), in a custom based on Numbers 15, verse 38:

The Lord said to Moses, Speak to the Israelites and say to them: ‘Throughout the generations to come you are to make tassels on the corners of your garments, with a blue cord on each tassel."

The decorative "S" initial of the right-hand banner compared to the plain "U" initial on the left, along with the content of the dialogue both show that the woman's statement on the right hand banner begins the dialogue. In an Alemannic dialect of German, it reads:

- Woman (right banner): Sye hat uch nyt gantz veracht Dye uch daß schnurlin hat gemacht.
- Man (left banner): Vn byllich het Sye eß gedan want Ich han eß sye genissē lan.

This translates as:

- Woman: She has not entirely despised you, who made you the lace. (or in a freer translation She who made your lace loved you very much)
- Man: And she would have done it cheaply, so I let her enjoy it. (or in a freer translation And she was right to do so, so I let her.)

It is a promise of fidelity by the couple, which is portrayed in a manner appropriate to their status, showing them in equally rich clothing and exchanging a gold-woven lace. The man assures that the woman that he has taken care of her well-being (and will continue to do so in the future). Assuming the man is Phillip, this would be consistent with the fact that a count like him could not marry a middle-class woman like her. The promise of fidelity would still have a logical historical reference, however, even if the image is an idealised depiction of late medieval love and not intended to resemble Phillip and his lover.

An analysis was published in 1996 arguing that the banners addressed an "unfair" or "Unbillig" (i.e. illegal) mismarriage, but this has now been rejected - reading Un byllich as Unbillig is in fact impossible since there is a divider between the two words. Even so, the painting's intention is still debated, thanks to the imagery and the ambiguous interpretations which the banners allow. For example, female jealousy is assumed to be a proof of love according to the love doctrine of Andreas Capellanus in the attributes, meaning that the picture represents a time-spanning apotheosis of the secrets of love. This, however, presupposes a completely different reading of the banner and would need a previous lover to have made the man's lace: Another female person addressed by the woman would have made the man's lace before the relationship depicted in the painting.

== Bibliography (in German) ==
- Martin Büchsel: Die höfische Kunst der Distanzierung und die Entwicklung des selbstbewussten Künstlertums. Das mittelalterliche Hausbuch, ehemals im Besitz der Familie zu Waldburg Wolfegg, und das Gothaer Liebespaar. In: Bemmann, Jan; Dahlmann, Dittmar; Taranczewski, Detlev (ed.s): Core, Periphery, Frontier – Spatial Patterns of Power (= Macht und Herrschaft 14). Göttingen 2021, S. 299–341.
- Eberhard Nellmann: Das ‘Gothaer Liebespaar’. Dokument einer Mesalliance? Hinweis auf eine andere Geliebte? Zu den Spruchbandversen des Gothaer Bildes. In: Zeitschrift für Deutsches Altertum und Deutsche Literatur 138, Nr. 2 (2009), S. 214–220.
- Josef Heinzelmann: Das „Gothaer Liebespaar“ ist ein Liebespaar, in: Archiv für Hessische Geschichte und Altertumskunde 57 (1999), S. 209–236.
- Allmuth Schuttwolf: Jahreszeiten der Gefühle. Das Gothaer Liebespaar und die Minne im Spätmittelalter. Hatje Cantz Verlag, 1998. ISBN 3-7757-0733-6
- Reinhard Dietrich: Die Landesverfassung in dem Hanauischen = Hanauer Geschichtsblätter 34, Hanau 1996. ISBN 3-9801933-6-5
- Gertrud Rudloff-Hille: Das Doppelbildnis eines Liebespaars unter dem Hanauischen Wappen im Schlossmuseum Gotha, in: Bildende Kunst (Berlin) Band 16, 1968, S. 19–23.
- Hans Martin Schmidt: Das Liebespaar des Hausbuchmeisters, in: 675 Jahre Hanau, Katalog-Nr. 89, Abb. 135.
- Ernst Julius Zimmermann: Hanau Stadt und Land, 3. Auflage, Hanau 1919, ND 1978.
