= Countess Palatine Margaret of Mosbach =

Countess consort of Hanau

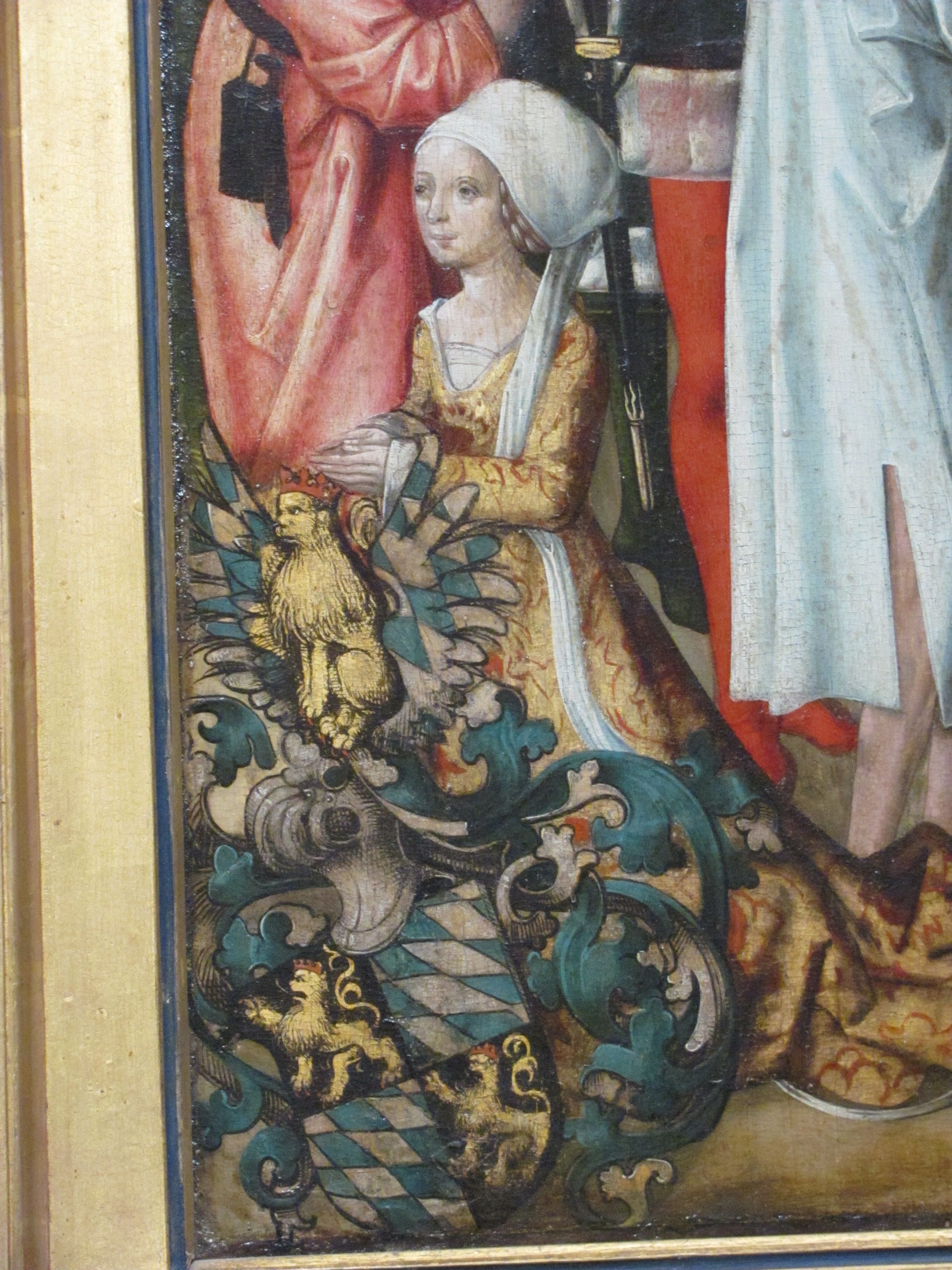
- Margaret in prayer, detail of the altarpiece at Wörth am Main. This image was painted some 30 years after her death, it may not be particularly accurate.
- Born: 2 March 1432
- Died: 14 September 1457 (aged 25)
- Buried: St. Mary's church in Hanau
- Noble family: House of Wittelsbach
- Spouse: Reinhard III, Count of Hanau
- Father: Otto I, Count Palatine of Mosbach
- Mother: Johanna of Bavaria-Landshut

Countess Palatine Margaret of Mosbach (2 March 1432 – 14 September 1457) was the eldest daughter of Count Palatine Otto I of Mosbach and his wife, Johanna of Bavaria-Landshut. She married on 11 July 1446 to Count Reinhard III of Hanau, who succeeded his father as ruling Count in 1451.

== Role in the division of the county ==
=== Context of the division ===
At the time of his accession Philip the Younger was only four years old. This situation presented the Hanau family with a dilemma:

- They could obey the primogeniture rule, which had been observed in Hanau since 1375. This would mean hoping that Philip the younger would live to an adult age, marry and have children, who would continue the dynasty. This would have the advantage that all of the family's possessions would remain in a single hand. It would entail the risk that the dynasty might die out, if Philip the Younger were to die without a male heir.
- Alternatively, the famlity could ignore the primogeniture decision and allowed the next agnate, Philip the Elder, to marry. This would have the advantage of significantly increasing the probability that the dynasty continued to exist, but the disadvantage that the county would have to be divided. This model also called for urgent action, as Philip the Elder was almost 40 years old, which was considered quite an advanced age in the 15th century. However, in this model, he would have to have his own territory, because a mere apanage, that is, a financial arrangement without sovereignty, as was practiced in early modern times, was still unthinkable in the 15th century.

=== Debating the division ===
In this debate, Margaret favoured the primogeniture solution, in which her son would inherit the whole county. Her father supported her. Catherine of Nassau-Beilstein, her mother-in-law, supported a division, as she wanted the dynasty to continue, but was indifferent s to whether this would happen via her grandson Philip the Younger or via her younger son Philip the Elder. She knew that Philip the Elder was capable of having a son (he already had an illegitimate son at that time) and she didn't want to be the continued existence of the dynasty on her four your old grandson. She managed to convince most of her relatives, and some or the more important organizations among the county's subjects, including the four cities of Hanau, Windecken, Babenhausen and Steinau, as well as her grandson's vassals.

Nevertheless, Margaret had her way. Catherine couldn't implement her plan until after Margaret died in 1457. In January 1458, a family pact was sealed, in which Philip the Elder received the parts of the county south of the river Main, i.e. the districts of Babenhausen and Schaafheim and Hanau's share of Umstadt. The pact also gave Philip the Elder permission to marry, which he did later that year.

== Death ==
Catherine died in 1457 and was buried in the church of St. Mary in Hanau.

== Painting ==
The image at the top of this article is a detail from an altar piece in the church of St. Mary in Hanau. This altar piece was commissioned by her son, Philip the Younger, for the souls of his parents, and was painted c. 1485/1490. Since it was painted some 30 years after her death, it would be reasonable to assume that it may not have been a very accurate portrait.

== Issue ==
Reinhard III and Margaret had two children:

1. Philip I the Younger (1449–1500);
2. Margaret (1452 – 14 March 1467), betrothed to Philip of Eppstein, died before they could marry.
