= Margarete Weißkirchner =

German noble

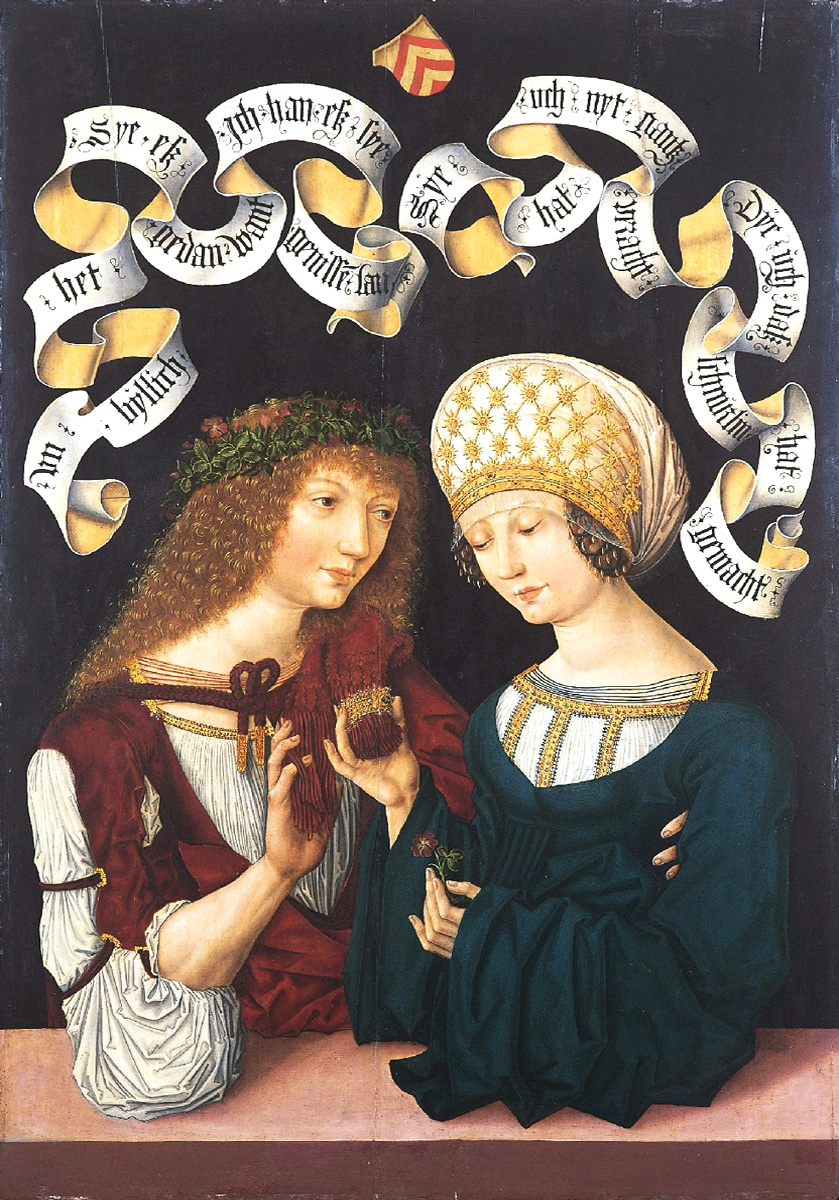
Margarete Weißkirchner and Philip I, Count of Hanau-Münzenberg

Margarete Weißkirchner (c. 1460-1500), was the common-law-wife of Philip I, Count of Hanau-Münzenberg from 1477 until their death in 1500. They openly lived together after the death of Philip's spouse in 1477. They could not marry, because she was a commoner. Margaret was not considered Philip's royal mistress, but was treated as though they were married.

He appeared with her in public. The most representative testimony is probably the first large-scale double-portrait in art history, the so-called Gotha Lovers. Their relationship is exceptionally well documented. The couple had three children:

- Elsa of Hanau, married around 1508 with Heinrich Rabe.
- John of Hanau-Münzenberg, a priest in Ober-Roden.
- Anne of Hanau, married in 1517 with Dietz Reuter, a publican at Ortenberg.

These children could not inherit the county, because they did not belong to the high nobility. Nevertheless, Philip and Margareta included them in their will.
