= Katharina of Nassau-Beilstein =

Noblewoman

- Died: 6 September 1459
- Buried: Church of St. Mary in Hanau
- Noble family: House of Nassau
- Spouse: Reinhard II, Count of Hanau
- Father: Henry II, Count of Nassau-Beilstein
- Mother: Katharina of Randerode

Katharina of Nassau-Beilstein (died 6 September 1459) was Countess of Hanau by marriage to Reinhard II, Count of Hanau, and regent of Hanau during the minority of her son Reinhard III from 1452 until 1458.

== Life ==
She was the daughter of Count Henry II of Nassau-Beilstein and his wife, Katharina of Randerode. By marriage, she was a Countess of Hanau.

She married on 18 January 1407 to Lord Reinhard II of Hanau, who was raised to Count of Hanau in 1429.

=== Regency ===
After the early death of her eldest son, Reinhard III, in 1452, she took up the regency for his son Philipp "the Younger", together with his maternal grandfather Count Palatine Otto I of Mosbach and her youngest son, Philipp "the Elder". In 1458, the County of Hanau was divided between Philipp the Younger and Philipp the Elder, and the latter was appointed sole guardian of the former, relieving Katharina of her duties as regent.

In the discussions that led to the county being divided, Katharina took the position that dividing the county and allowing Philipp the Elder to marry would increase the chances of survival for the House of Hanau and was therefore preferable to strictly observing the primogeniture decree. Katharina had no preference as to whether the line would continue via her grandson Philipp the Younger or via her son Philipp the Elder. She held that the House of Hanau was in danger of dying out and that allowing Philipp the Elder to marry would be wiser than gambling on the ability of Philipp the Younger, who was only four years old, to procreate.

Katharina died on 6 September 1459, and was buried in the Church of St. Mary in Hanau.

== Issue ==
She had the following children:

1. Katharina (1408–1460), married:
  1. in 1421 with Count Thomas II of Rieneck (1408–1431)
  2. between 1432 and 1434 with Count Wilhelm II of Henneberg-Schleusingen (1415–1444, died in a hunting accident)
2. Anna (born: 15 June 1409), after 1439 abbess of the Patershausen monastery
3. Margaret (1411–1441), married in 1440 with Gottfried VIII of Eppstein (d. 1466)
4. Reinhard III (1412–1452), succeeded his father in 1451 as ruler of the County of Hanau
5. Elisabeth (1416–1446), married on 4 May 1432 with Wild- and Rhinegrave Johann IV of Dhaun (1422–1476)
6. Philipp I "the Elder" (1417–1480), founder of the Hanau-Lichtenberg line
