= Reinhard III of Hanau =

Reinhard III, Count of Hanau
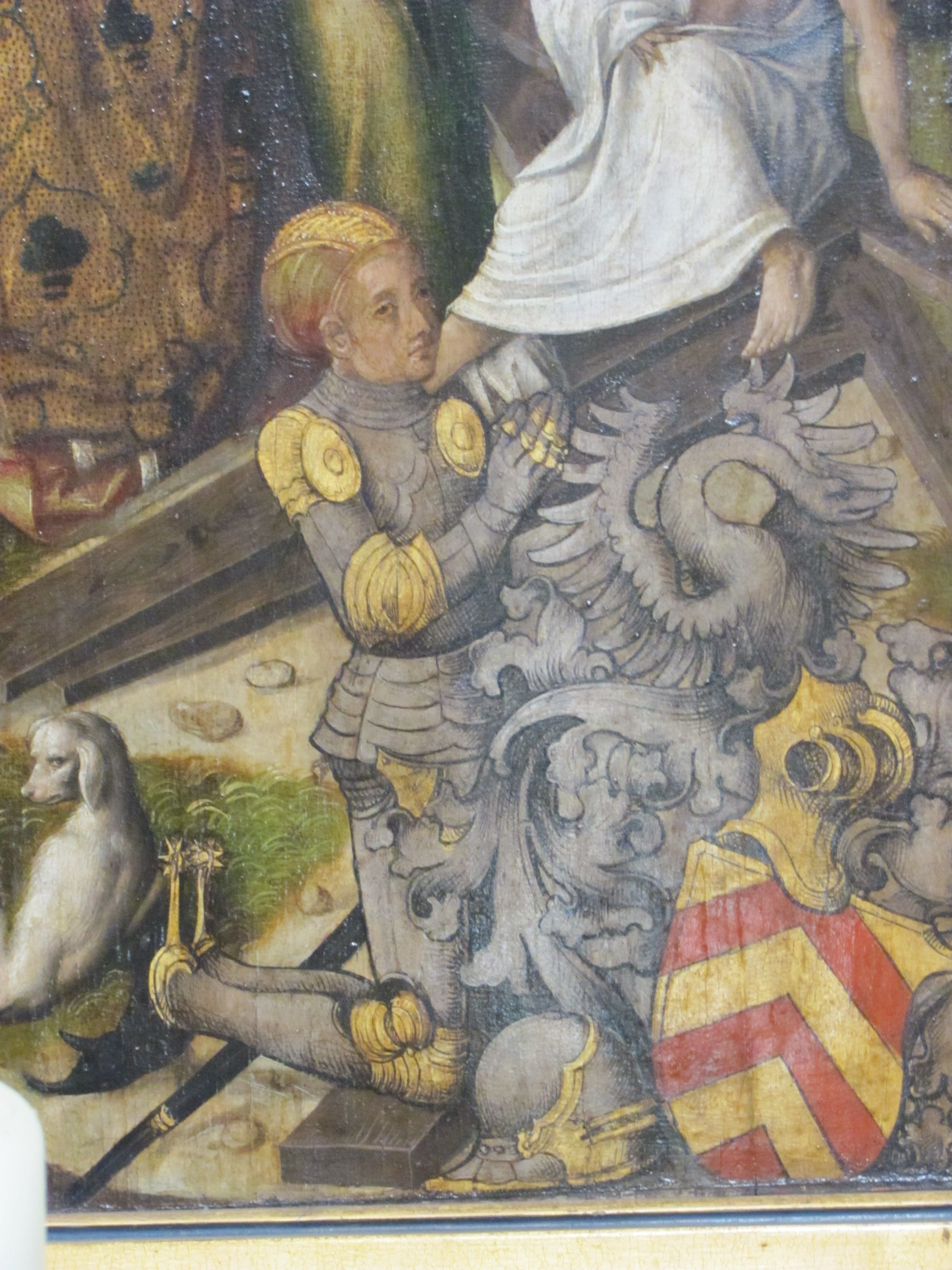
- Count Reinhard III of Hanau, detail of the altarpiece at Wörth am Main
- Born: 22 April 1412
- Died: 20 April 1452 (aged 39); Heidelberg
- Buried: St. Mary's Church in Hanau
- Noble family: House of Hanau
- Spouse: Countess Palatine Margaret of Mosbach
- Father: Reinhard II, Count of Hanau
- Mother: Catherine of Nassau-Beilstein

Count Reinhard III of Hanau (22 April 1412 – 20 April 1452 in Heidelberg) was Count of Hanau from 1451 until his death. He was the son of Count Reinhard II of Hanau and his wife, Catherine of Nassau-Beilstein.

== Reign ==
In 1434, when his father was still alive, he took over the guardianship of the children of his widowed sister from her first marriage with Count Thomas II of Rieneck, when she remarried with Count William II of Henneberg-Schleusingen. When his father died in 1451, he took up government of the County of Hanau. However, he died only ten months later. During his short reign, nothing remarkable happened.

== Death ==
Reinhard III died on 20 April 1452 in Heidelberg. He had travelled to Heidelberg to be treated by a specialist at Heidelberg University. He was buried in the St. Mary's Church in Hanau.

For the next 200 years, all but one of the Counts of Hanau-Münzenberg were minors when they inherited the county and died before their 30th birthday, leaving the county to an underage son. The only exception was Reinhard IV. This pattern started with Reinhard III and repeated over nine generations.

== Image ==
A Late Gothic winged altarpiece at Wörth am Main from around 1485-1490 – originally from St. Mary's Church in Hanau – depicts Count Philip the Younger and his ancestors, including Reinhard III and his wife. Since this image was painted 40 years after Reinhard's death, it is reasonable to assume that it is not very accurate.

== Marriage and issue ==
He married on 11 July 1446 with Countess Palatine Margaret of Mosbach (2 March 1432 – 14 September 1457). They had two children:

1. Philip I the Younger (1449–1500);
2. Margaret (1452 – March 14, 1467), betrothed to Philip of Eppstein, died before the marriage.

== Ancestors ==
Ancestors of Reinhard III of Hanau

8. Ulrich III, Lord of Hanau (1310 – 1369 or 1370)
4. Ulrich IV, Lord of Hanau (betw. 1330/40 – 1380)
9. Countess Adelaide of Nassau (d. 1344)
2. Reinhard II, Count of Hanau (c. 1369 – 1451)
10. Count Eberhard of Wertheim (d. 1373)
5. Countess Elisabeth of Wertheim (1347–1378)
11. Burgravine Catherine of Hohenzollern (d. after 1369)
1. Reinhard III, Count of Hanau
12. Henry I, Count of Nassau-Beilstein (d. 1378/1380)
6. Henry II, Count of Nassau-Beilstein (d. 1412)
13. Meyna of Westerburg (d. 1388)
3. Catherine of Nassau-Beilstein (d. 1459)
14. Arnold of Randerode
7. Catherine of Randerode (d. c. 1415)

== Footnotes ==
Reinhard III of Hanau House of Hanau Born: 22 April 1412 Died: 20 April 1452
Preceded by Reinhard II	Count of Hanau; 1451-1452	Succeeded by Philip I the Younger
