= Henry II of Nassau-Beilstein =

Henry II, Count of Nassau-Beilstein
- Died: 1410
- Noble family: House of Nassau
- Spouse: Catherine of Randerode
- Father: Henry I, Count of Nassau-Beilstein
- Mother: Imagina of Westerburg

Henry II, Count of Nassau-Beilstein (died 1410) was the eldest son of Henry I and his wife, Imagina (Meyna) of Westerburg. He succeeded his father in 1388 as Count of Nassau-Beilstein and ruled jointly with his younger brother Reinhard.

In 1383, Henry married Catherine of Randerode. They had four children:

- Catherine (d. 1459), married in 1407 to Reinhard II, Count of Hanau
- John I (d. 1473). His son Henry IV was father of John II.
- William (d. 1430)
- Henry III (d. 1477)

Henry II of Nassau-Beilstein House of Nassau Died: 1410
Preceded by Henry I	Count of Nassau-Beilstein; 1388-1410; With: Reinhard	Succeeded by John I and Reinhard
