= Reinhard II of Hanau =

Reinhard II, Count of Hanau
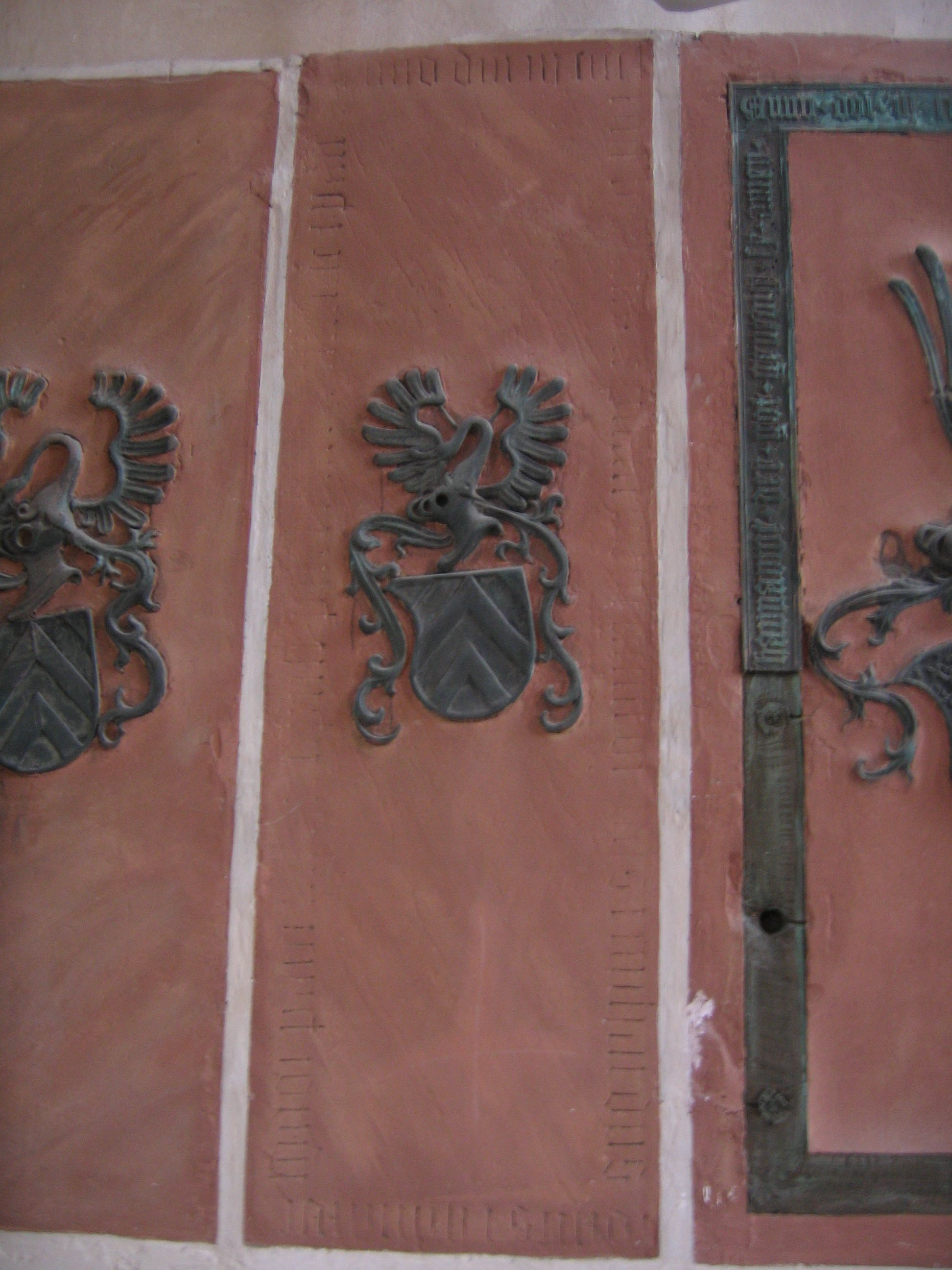
- Reihard's grave stone in the St. Mary's Church in Hanau
- Born: c. 1369
- Died: 26 June 1451; Hanau
- Noble family: House of Hanau
- Spouse: Catherine of Nassau-Beilstein
- Father: Ulrich IV, Lord of Hanau
- Mother: Elizabeth of Wertheim

Reinhard II of Hanau (c. 1369 – 26 June 1451 in Hanau) was Lord of Hanau and from 1429 Count of Hanau. He was one of the most important members of the House of Hanau.

== Youth ==
The exact date of his birth is not known, not even the exact year, because in the Middle Ages a person's death date was considered far more important than their birth date, since a memorial mass would be celebrated on the death date.

He was the second son of Ulrich IV of Hanau (born: between 1330 and 1340; died: in September or October 1380) and Countess Elizabeth of Wertheim (1347–1378 ). In the ruling family of Hanau, an explicit primogeniture statue of 1375 stipulated that only the eldest son could inherit the Lordship and even that only he could marry. Reinhard II as second son of Ulrich IV as was destined for a clerical career. He received a suitable education for such a career; in 1387 he was studying at the University of Bologna. In 1390, one of the sons of Ulrich IV, possibly Reinhard II, was enrolled as a student at the university of Heidelberg. The entry in the register does not mention a name, it merely states de Hanaw domicellus. Reinhard abandoned his spiritual career in 1391, and closed a contract with his elder brother Ulrich V, which guaranteed him an annual income. The background was probably that Ulrich V's marriage was still childless and they wanted to preserve the possibility that Reinhard might succeed Ulrich V. The contract awarded Reinhard an annual sum of 400 florins and a share in the districts Partenstein, Rieneck, Bieber and Haßlau. This was the first generation in the history of the Hanau family where the younger sons did not join the clergy. In 1398, the contract was renewed, and Ulrich and Reinhard's younger brother John of Hanau was also awarded a pension, after a dispute with John had led to fighting.

== Reign ==
=== Background ===
The heir apparent of Ulrich IV was Reinhard II's elder brother Ulrich V. Ulrich formally ruled Hanau from his father's death in 1380. However, as he was a minor at the time, a regency was set up, until he came of age in 1388. At that time, he was still without a male heir. Under the primogeniture statute, only the eldest son was allowed to marry; consequently, the continued existence of the dynasty was under threat. In 1391, a family contract was concluded, which allowed Reinhard II to marry if Ulrich still had no sons 10 years later. This 10-year period was due to end in 1401. Around 1395, a coalition between Reinhard and his younger brother John emerged. They acted independently from Ulrich and pursued policies directed against him. An open dispute arose, which was resolved by the settlement of 1398. Nevertheless, further disputes occurred, and even a feud.

From 1394 onward, Ulrich V ran into economic difficulties. In 1396, the problem intensified. He had to pledge the two cities of Hanau and Babenhausen to his neighbour and political rival, the Archbishop John II of Mainz, who became de facto co-ruler of the Lordship of Hanau. On the other hand, Ulrich and his brothers were first cousins once removed of John II, so the ruling power remained in the family.

=== Coup of 1404 ===
From 1400 onward, Reinhard and John of Hanau came to a political understanding with John II of Mainz. In 1402, their relationship became even closer and eventually, John II changed sides in the conflict the two younger brothers had with Ulrich. In 1404, power gradually shifted from Ulrich V to Reinhard II and on 26 November 1404, Ulrich was forced to abdicate.

From 1404 to 1411, Reinhard and John ruled jointly. After John died in 1411, Reinhard II ruled alone.

=== Expansion of the County ===
The most important event of the dynastic reign of Reinhard II is his elevation to Imperial Count on 11 December 1429 by emperor Sigismund.

From the year 1400, Reinhard II is active in imperial affairs. He co-signed the document, which deposes King Wenceslaus, and he was present at the election of King Sigismund in 1411. He appears as a witness at the elections of Emperor Albert II in 1438 and Frederick III in 1442. In 1401, Reinhard II and his brother John received and invitation to participate in an expedition to Rome. In 1414, he attended the Council of Constance.

Reinhard II was often involved in feuds with neighbouring noblemen. In 1405, he fought in the side of Rupert against the robber barons in the Wetterau area. They dealt with the Water Castle at Rückingen, the castle at Höchst, Mömbris Castle, Wasserlos Castle, Hüttelngesäß Castle, Karben Castle and Hauenstein Castle. He also acted to maintain the regional peace, and to promote local agreements to resolve disputes and feuds peacefully and judicially. For example, in 1434, he mediated such an agreement between Mainz, Eppstein, Isenburg-Büdingen and Rieneck. He also served short term as regent in the County of Rieneck.

His long reign was marked by an upswing in county government and later in many areas. This is for example reflected in the fact that during his reign, the dowry of his daughters got higher and higher. He reformed the administration and the judiciary. In 1434, the County of Hanau is released from all forms of foreign jurisdiction. He promoted churches and schools. His reign represent the beginning of the transition from the Middle Ages to the Early Modern Period and the transition to a modern territorial state.

During his reign, the territory of the County was expanded. In 1434, he received the district of Bornheimerberg as a fief (it had been pledged to him earlier by the Empire); in 1435, he acquired half the mortgage stock on Gelnhausen (the Electorate of the Palatinate held the other half), and in 1446, he acquired a part of the inheritance of the Counts of Falkenstein.

The focus in his county shifts to the city of Hanau. Some authors report that the capital was officially moved from Windecken Castle to Hanau in 1436, but no proof of this is available. The city of Hanau expanded during his reign, into the area of today's Hospital Street. Reinhard II expanded the Late Gothic collegiate Church of Mary Magdalene and increased the number of altar priests. During this period, the Church of Mary Magdalene became the parish church of Hanau, replacing the church at Kinzdorf.

=== Relation to the Archbishopric of Mainz ===
During the reign of Ulrich V, Hanau had fallen into ever greater dependence on the Archbishop in Mainz. For example, when the archbishop of Mainz spoke of "his" city of Hanau, he had obviously – possibly by a mortgage – gained control of the city. Reinhard II's attempts during the early years of his reign, to reverse this trend, were successful.

The climax of this development was reached when, after the death of the archbishop in 1419, Reinhard II succeeded in recovering absolute title over the cities of Hanau and Babenhausen. For centuries, the counts of Hanau served Martini wine on certain occasions. There is a legend that this custom was introduced to celebrate Reinhard's recovery of control over Hanau. There is, however, no reliable evidence of this origin.

Mainz was more successful in its attempts to expand on the other side of the Main (river): in 1425, the archbishop purchased the district of Steinheim from the Lords of Eppstein. Thus Mainz continued to present a threat to the County of Hanau.

== Death ==
Reinhard II died on 26 June 1451 and was buried in St. Mary's Church in Hanau. He was the first member of the House of Hanau to be buried there, as all his ancestors had been buried at Arnsburg Abbey.

His grave stone has been preserved to this day.

== Marriage and issue ==
The 1391 contract allowed Reinhard II to marry. He did so on 18 January 1407 with Catherine of Nassau-Beilstein (died: 6 September 1459). they had the following children:

1. Catherine (1408–1460), married:
  1. in 1421 with Count Thomas II of Rieneck (1408–1431)
  2. between 1432 and 1434 with Count William II of Henneberg-Schleusingen (1415–1444, died in a hunting accident)
2. Anna (born: 15 June 1409), after 1439 abbess of the Patershausen monastery
3. Margaret (1411–1441)
  1. married in 1440 with Gottfried VIII of Epstein (d. 1466)
4. Reinhard III (1412–1452), succeeded his father in 1451 as ruler of the County of Hanau
5. Elisabeth (1416–1446)
  1. married on 4 May 1432 with Wild- and Rhinegrave John IV of Dhaun (1422–1476)
6. Philip I "the Elder" (1417–1480), founder of the Hanau-Lichtenberg line

== Ancestors ==
Ancestors of Reinhard II of Hanau

8. Ulrich II, Lord of Hanau (1280–1346)
4. Ulrich III, Lord of Hanau (c. 1310–1369/70)
9. Agnes of Hohenlohe (before 1295 – 1343)
2. Ulrich IV, Lord of Hanau (1330/40–1380)
10. Gerlach I, Count of Nassau (1283–1361)
5. Adelheid of Nassau (d. 1344)
11. Agnes of Hesse (d. 1371)
1. Reinhard II, Count of Hanau
12. Rudolph III of Wertheim (1302–1355)
6. Eberhard I of Wertheim (d. 1373)
13. Elizabeth of Breuberg (d. 1358)
3. Elizabeth of Wertheim (1347–1378)
14. Frederick IV, Burgrave of Nuremberg (1287–1332)
7. Catherine of Hohenzollern (died: after 1369)
15. Margaret of Carinthia (died: after 1348)

== Footnotes ==
Reinhard II of Hanau House of Hanau Born: c. 1369 Died: 26 Juni 1451
Preceded by Ulrich V as Lord of Hanau	Count of Hanau; 1404-1451	Succeeded by Reinhard III
