= Katharina of Hanau, Countess of Wied =

- Born: 26 March 1525
- Died: 20 August 1581 (aged 56)
- Noble family: House of Hanau
- Spouses: Johann IV of Wied-Runkel and Isenburg
- Father: Philipp II, Count of Hanau-Münzenberg
- Mother: Juliana of Stolberg

Katharina of Hanau (26 March 1525 – 20 August 1581) was the eldest daughter of Philipp II, Count of Hanau-Münzenberg and Countess Juliana of Stolberg.

== Marriage and issue ==
Katharina married in 1543 to Count Johann IV of Wied-Runkel and Isenburg (d. 15 June 1581). In 1525, he was mentioned as a canon in Cologne; he later reverted to the lay state. They had the following children:

1. Herman I (d. 10 December 1591), succeeded his father 1581; married Countess Walpurga of Bentheim-Steinfurt
2. Wilhelm (d. 1612), succeeded his father in 1581 in Runkel and Dierdorf, the so-called "Upper County of Wied"; married Countess Johanna Sibylla of Hanau-Lichtenberg
3. Juliane (1545–1606), married Reichard, Count Palatine of Simmern-Sponheim
4. Magdalena (d. 13 October 1606), married to Count Siegmund of Hardegg (d. 1599)
5. Anna (d. 1590), married to Johann Wilhelm of Rogendorff (d. 1590)
6. Katharina (27 May 1552 – 13 November 1584), married to Philipp V, Count of Hanau-Lichtenberg
7. Agnes (d. 1 May 1581), married to Gottfried IV Schenk IV of Limpurg-Speckfeld-Obersontheim (d. 1581)

== Ancestors ==
Ancestors of Katharina of Hanau, Countess of Wied

8. Philipp I, Count of Hanau-Münzenberg (1449-1500)
4. Reinhard IV, Count of Hanau-Münzenberg (1473-1512)
9. Adriana of Nassau-Siegen (1449-1477)
2. Philipp II, Count of Hanau-Münzenberg (1501-1529)
10. Günther XXXVIII of Schwarzburg-Blankenburg (1450-1484)
5. Katharina of Schwarzburg-Blankenburg (1470-1514)
11. Katharina of Querfurt (d. 1521)
1. Katharina of Hanau, Countess of Wied
12. Henry the Elder of Stolberg (1436-1511)
6. Bodo VIII, Count of Stolberg-Wernigerode (1467-1538)
13. Mathilde of Mansfeld (d. 1468)
3. Juliana of Stolberg (1506-1580)
14. Philipp I of Eppstein-Königstein (1459-1481)
7. Anna of Eppstein-Königstein (1482-1538)
15. Countess Ludovika of Mark (d. 1499)
