= Philipp II of Hanau-Münzenberg =

Count of Hanau-Münzenberg (1501–1529)

Philipp II
- Born: 17 August 1501; Hanau
- Died: 28 March 1529 (aged 27); Hanau
- Buried: St. Mary's Church in Hanau
- Noble family: House of Hanau
- Spouse: Juliana of Stolberg
- Father: Reinhard IV, Count of Hanau-Münzenberg
- Mother: Katharina of Schwarzburg-Blankenburg

Philipp II (17 August 1501 in Hanau – 28 March 1529 in Hanau) was Count of Hanau-Münzenberg from 1512 until his death. He was the son of Count Reinhard IV and his wife, Katharina of Schwarzburg-Blankenburg.

== Regency ==
Philipp II of Hanau-Münzenberg was only 11 years old when he inherited the county. A guardian and regent were needed for him and his seven years younger brother Balthasar. A regency council was installed by the Reichskammergericht at the recommendation of their mother, after she had consulted the lower nobility in the county. The council consisted initially of Philipp's mother and his great-uncle Count John V of Nassau-Siegen. Philipp's mother died in 1514 and John V was the sole regent until he died himself in 1516. After John's death, the Reichskammergericht appointed, at Philipp's recommendation, John's son, Count William I of Nassau-Siegen as regent. William held the regency for five years, until Philipp was declared an adult in 1521, at the age of 20.

== Reign ==
During the regency, Hanau-Münzenberg joined the Wetterau Association of Imperial Counts.

The start of the Reformation fell during Philipp's reign. However, it hardly effected the county. The German Peasants' War also happened in this period, but it only sporadically came to riots in Hanau-Münzenberg. The Benedictine convent at Schlüchtern had to put itself under Philipp's protection, according to different sources either in Hanau or in Steinau an der Straße, when rebellious peasants were approaching from Fulda. There were incidents in other towns in the country, for example in Orb, Partenstein, Preungesheim, Bornheimerberg and Niederrodenbach. The St. Wolfgang monastery in the Bulau forest near Hanau was devastated.

In 1528, construction began of a new city wall surrounding Hanau. The city had grown outside its Medieval city wall and a new settlement had sprung into existence arounds today's Hospital street. The new wall would surround these newer parts of the city. It was the first implementation of a new defensive system designed by Albrecht Dürer. Construction took nearly 20 years. Simultaneously, the City Castle in Hanau was extended and strengthened. This project would take until 1560 to complete.

The potential existed for a dispute between Philipp II and his seven years younger brother Balthasar about whether to obey the primogeniture statue and to give Balthasar only an apanage or to divide the county. When Balthasar's twentieth birthday approached, the regency council decided to opt for primogeniture. A treaty to this affect was drafted. However, Philipp II died before the treaty was sealed. This created a legal problem when Balthasar wanted to take up the regency for Philipp's sons, since his renunciation of his right to inherit and to reign was included in this draft treaty.

== Death ==
Philipp II, Count of Hanau-Münzenberg died on Easter Sunday of 1529, only 28 years old, leaving three surviving children and a pregnant widow. His funeral took place just one day later in the St. Mary's Church in Hanau, without any pump or circumstance, to spare his widow in her condition. The day after the funeral, she gave birth to his posthumous daughter Juliana.

During the almost 200 years that Hanau-Münzenberg existed, almost all counts died before their 30th birthday, leaving a minor to inherit the county. This is unlikely to be a coincidence, as it happened in nine successive generations. It suggests that the counts had an inheritable disease, although it is unknown which disease that would be. The first of the nine counts to die early was Reinhard III.

== Legacy ==
The new Hanau city gate was decorated with a portrait, carved in stone, of Philipp and Balthasar. The portrait was later put on display in the museum the Historical Society of Hanau. It was destroyed in a bomb attack on 19 May 1945, during World War II.

== Marriage and issue ==
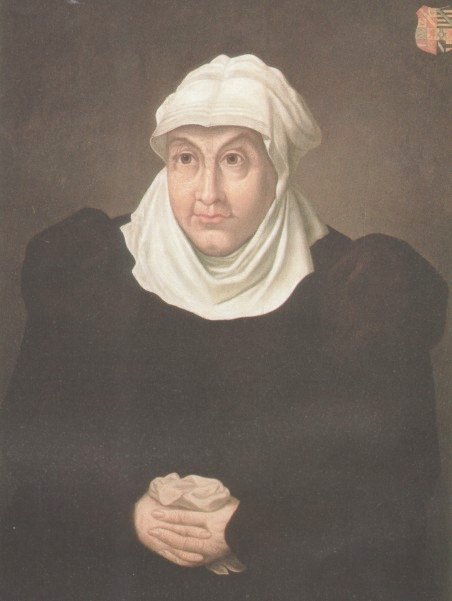
Juliana of Stolberg

On 27 January 1523, Philipp II married Countess Juliana of Stolberg (15 February 1506 – 18 June 1580). They had five children:

1. Reinhard (10 April 1524 – 12 April 1525)
2. Katharina (1525–1581), married to Count Johann IV of Wied-Runkel
3. Philipp III (1526–1561)
4. Reinhard (1528–1554)
5. Juliana (1529–1595), married with Thomas, Wild- and Rhinegrave of Salm-Kirburg, and after his death with Count Herman of Manderscheid-Blankenheim

After Philipp's death, Juliana married William I, Count of Nassau-Siegen and had twelve more children.

== Ancestors ==
Ancestors of Philipp II of Hanau-Münzenberg

8. Reinhard III, Count of Hanau (1412–1452)
4. Philipp I, Count of Hanau-Münzenberg (1449–1500)
9. Countess Palatine Margaret of Mosbach (1432–1457)
2. Reinhard IV, Count of Hanau-Münzenberg (1473–1512)
10. John IV, Count of Nassau-Siegen (1410–1475)
5. Adriana of Nassau-Siegen (1449–1477)
11. Mary of Looz-Heinsberg (1424–1502)
1. Philipp II, Count of Hanau-Münzenberg
12. Heinrich XXVI of Schwarzburg-Blankenburg (1418–1488)
6. Günther XXXVIII of Schwarzburg-Blankenburg (1450–1484)
13. Elisabeth of Cleves (1420–1488)
3. Katharina of Schwarzburg-Blankenburg (1470–1514)
14. Bruno VIII of Querfurt (1426–1496)
7. Katharina of Querfurt (d. 1521)
15. Elisabeth of Mansfeld (d. 1482)

== Footnotes ==
Philipp II of Hanau-Münzenberg House of Hanau Born: 17 August 1501 Died: 28 March 1529
Preceded by Reinhard IV	Count of Hanau-Münzenberg; 1512-1529	Succeeded by Philipp III
