= Balthasar of Hanau-Münzenberg =

- Born: 29 June 1508
- Died: 9 December 1534 (aged 26); Hanau
- Buried: Church of St. Mary in Hanau
- Noble family: House of Hanau
- Father: Reinhard IV, Count of Hanau-Münzenberg
- Mother: Catherine of Schwarzburg-Blankenburg

Balthasar of Hanau-Münzenberg (29 June 1508 – 9 December 1534, in Hanau) was a posthumous son of Count Reinhard IV of Hanau-Münzenberg (1473 - 1512) and his wife Countess Catherine of Schwarzburg-Blankenburg (d. 1514).

== Life ==
From 1529, he acted as co-regent for his nephew, Count Philip III, whose father had died young. He continued the construction of fortifications around Hanau, which his brother Philip II had begun. He supplemented the fortresses with a defensive ring according to the latest technical standard of the Renaissance.

Balthasar never married. Like most male members of the Hanau-Münzenberg line, he died young, in 1534, at the age of 26. He was buried in the church of St. Mary in Hanau.

One of Hanau's city gates was decorated with a bust of Balthasar, until the gate was demolished in the 18th century. The bust fell into the hands of the Historical Society of Hanau. It was destroyed when the city was bombed on 19 March 1945. Only drawings of it remain.

== Ancestors ==
Ancestors of Balthasar of Hanau-Münzenberg

8. Reinhard III, Count of Hanau (1412-1452)
4. Philip I, Count of Hanau-Münzenberg (1449-1500)
9. Countess Palatine Margaret of Mosbach (1432-1457)
2. Reinhard IV, Count of Hanau-Münzenberg (1473-1512)
10. John IV, Count of Nassau-Siegen (1410-1475)
5. Adriana of Nassau-Siegen (1449-1477)
11. Mary of Looz-Heinsberg (1424-1502)
1. Philip II, Count of Hanau-Münzenberg
12. Henry XXVI of Schwarzburg-Blankenburg (1418-1488)
6. Günther XXXVIII of Schwarzburg-Blankenburg (1450-1484)
13. Elisabeth of Cleves (1420-1488)
3. Catherine of Schwarzburg-Blankenburg (1470-1514)
14. Bruno VIII of Querfurt (1426-1496)
7. Catherine of Querfurt (d. 1521)
15. Elisabeth of Mansfeld (d. 1482)
