= Reinhard IV of Hanau-Münzenberg =

Count of Hanau-Münzenberg

Reinhard IV, Count of Hanau-Münzenberg
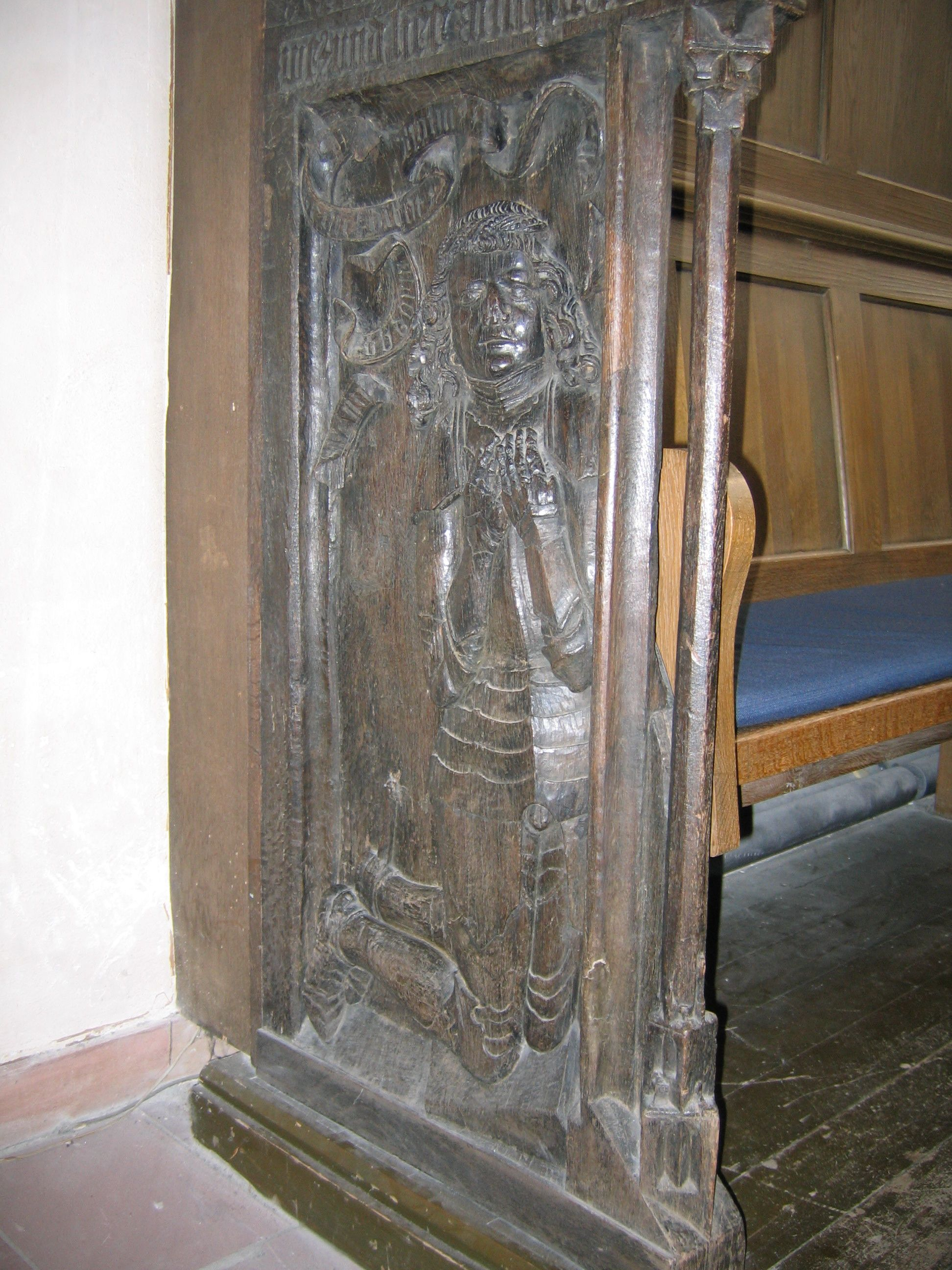
- Reinhard IV, depicted on the side of the choir stalls in the St. Mary's Church in Hanau
- Born: 14 March 1473
- Died: 30 January 1512 (aged 38)
- Buried: St. Mary's Church in Hanau
- Noble family: House of Hanau
- Spouse: Katharina of Schwarzburg-Blankenburg
- Father: Philipp I, Count of Hanau-Münzenberg
- Mother: Adriana of Nassau-Siegen

Count Reinhard IV of Hanau-Münzenberg (14 March 1473 – 30 January 1512) succeeded in 1500 his father Philipp I of Hanau-Münzenberg (1449–1500) in the government of the County of Hanau-Münzenberg. He served as co-regent from 1496 onwards.

== Youth ==
Reinhard IV was born the son of Philipp I, Count of Hanau-Münzenberg and his wife, Countess Adriana of Nassau-Siegen (1449–1477). His godfather was Prince-abbot Johann II of Henneberg-Schleusingen of the Fulda monastery.

Reinhard IV made several journeys in his youth: in 1493 to the Palatine court at Heidelberg and in 1495 to the Diet of Worms.

== Government ==
From 1496 to 1500, Reinhard IV acted as co-ruler alongside his father who was already disabled by old age.

He was the first count to use the name Hanau-Münzenberg, to distinguish his line from his relatives in Hanau-Lichtenberg. The two lines had existed since the county was divided between Philipp the Elder and Philipp the Younger in 1458. Reinhard also added the arms of the Lordship of Münzenberg to his coat of arms.

In 1500, Reinhard exchanged some territories with the County of Isenburg, giving them Offenbach am Main and his share of Bracht and received the village of Bischofsheim (now part of Maintal) in return, thereby ending a protracted conflict between the two neighboring rulers. In 1503, he exchanged half the village of Trais (now part of Münzenberg) for the share in Seckbach held by the Counts of Solms. In 1504, he purchased the other shares in Seckbach from their respective owners: the Schelme von Bergen family, the Farchen of Heidelberg family and the Glauburg family in Frankfurt.

The County of Hanau-Münzenberg suffered badly during the Landshut War of Succession in 1504, from the Hessian troops passing through the county and from the Hessian occupation of Bad Homburg, which Hanau had purchased in 1487 for 19,000 guilders. This issue was mediated by Emperor Charles V at the Diet of Worms in 1521. Hesse was allowed to keep Homburg, but had to reimburse Hanau with 000 guilders.

In 1505, Emperor Maximilian I appointed Reinhard IV as his councillor.

Reinhard IV was involved in several other disputes about his rights and his policies. His most prominent opponent may have been Götz von Berlichingen, who raided a convoy in the Kinzig valley which was protected by Reinhard's troops. The Lords of Hutten joined the resulting controversy, claiming the raid had happened on their territory.

== Marriage and issue ==
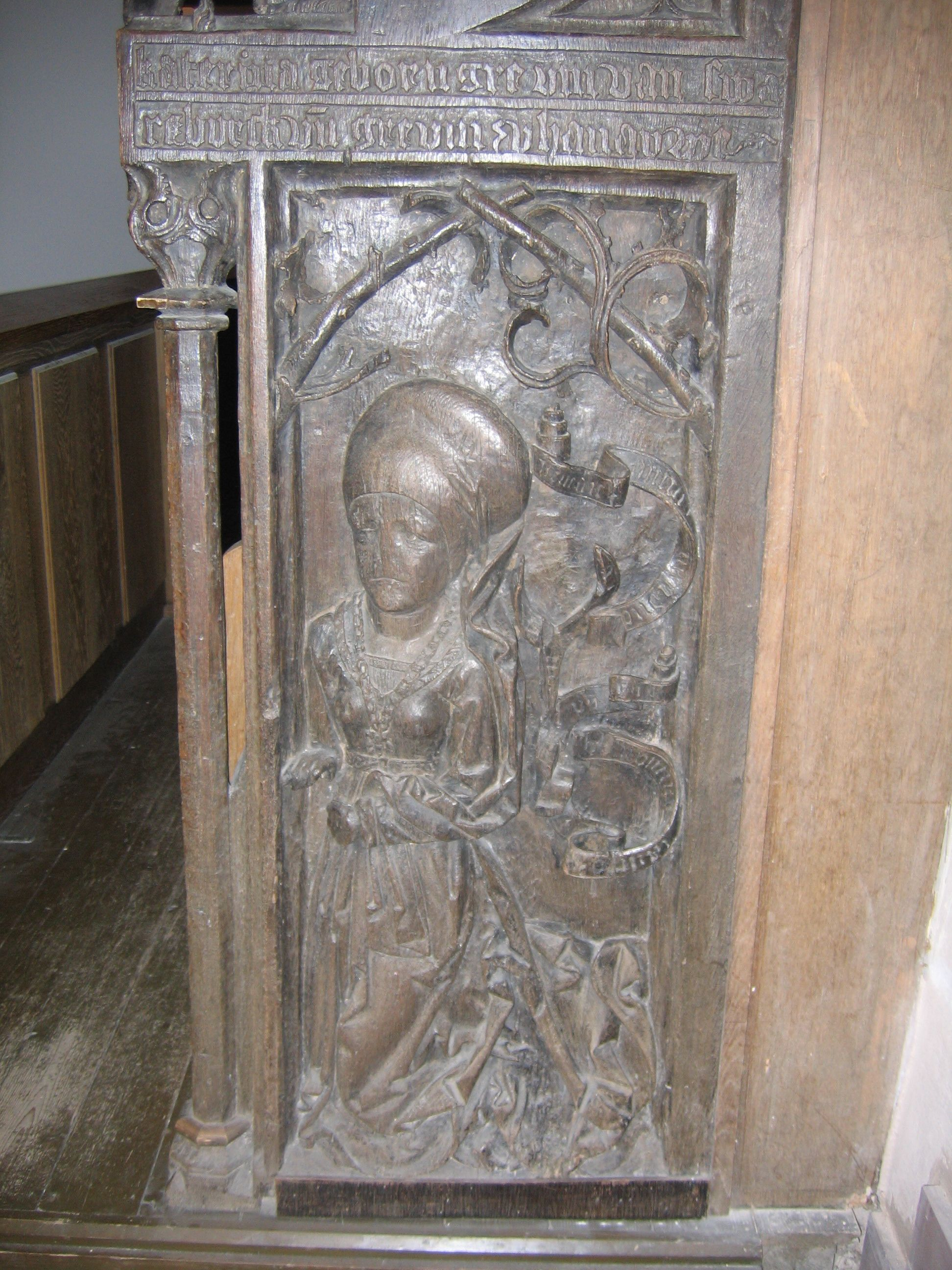
Katharina von Schwarzburg's portrait on Choir Stall opposite her husband's portrait

Reinhard IV married on 13 February 1496 with Katharina of Schwarzburg-Blankenburg (after 1470 – 27 November 1514). She received as dowry 4000 florins plus the Schwarzburg share of the mortgage of the imperial city of Gelnhausen.

Reinhard IV and Katharina had four children:

1. Anna (born: 22 May 1498 – died in the same year)
2. Berthold (born: 12 July 1499 – died: 27 April 1504), buried in the choir of St. Mary's Church in Hanau
3. Philipp II (1501–1529)
4. Balthasar (1508–1534)

== Death ==
Reinhard IV died on 30 January 1512 and was buried in the choir of St. Mary's Church in Hanau.

== Ancestors ==
Ancestors of Reinhard IV of Hanau-Münzenberg

8. Reinhard II, Count of Hanau (1369–1451)
4. Reinhard III, Count of Hanau (1412–1452)
9. Katharina of Nassau-Beilstein (c. 1370-1459)
2. Philipp I, Count of Hanau-Münzenberg (1449–1500)
10. Otto I, Count Palatine of Mosbach (1390–1461)
5. Countess Palatine Margaret of Mosbach (1432–1457)
11. Joanna of Bavaria-Landshut (1413–1444)
1. Reinhard IV, Count of Hanau-Münzenberg
12. Engelbert I of Nassau (c. 1380-1442)
6. John IV, Count of Nassau-Siegen (1410–1475)
13. Johanna van Polanen (1392–1445)
3. Adriana of Nassau-Siegen (1449–1477)
14. Johann II of Loon and Heinsberg (1381–1438)
7. Mary of Looz-Heinsberg (1424–1502)
15. Anna of Solms (d. 1433)

== Footnotes ==
Reinhard IV of Hanau-Münzenberg House of Hanau Born: 14 March 1473 Died: 14 March 1473
Preceded by Philipp I	Count of Hanau-Münzenberg; 1500–1512	Succeeded by Philipp II
