= Adriana of Nassau-Siegen =

German countess (1449–1477)

- Countess Consort of Hanau-Münzenberg
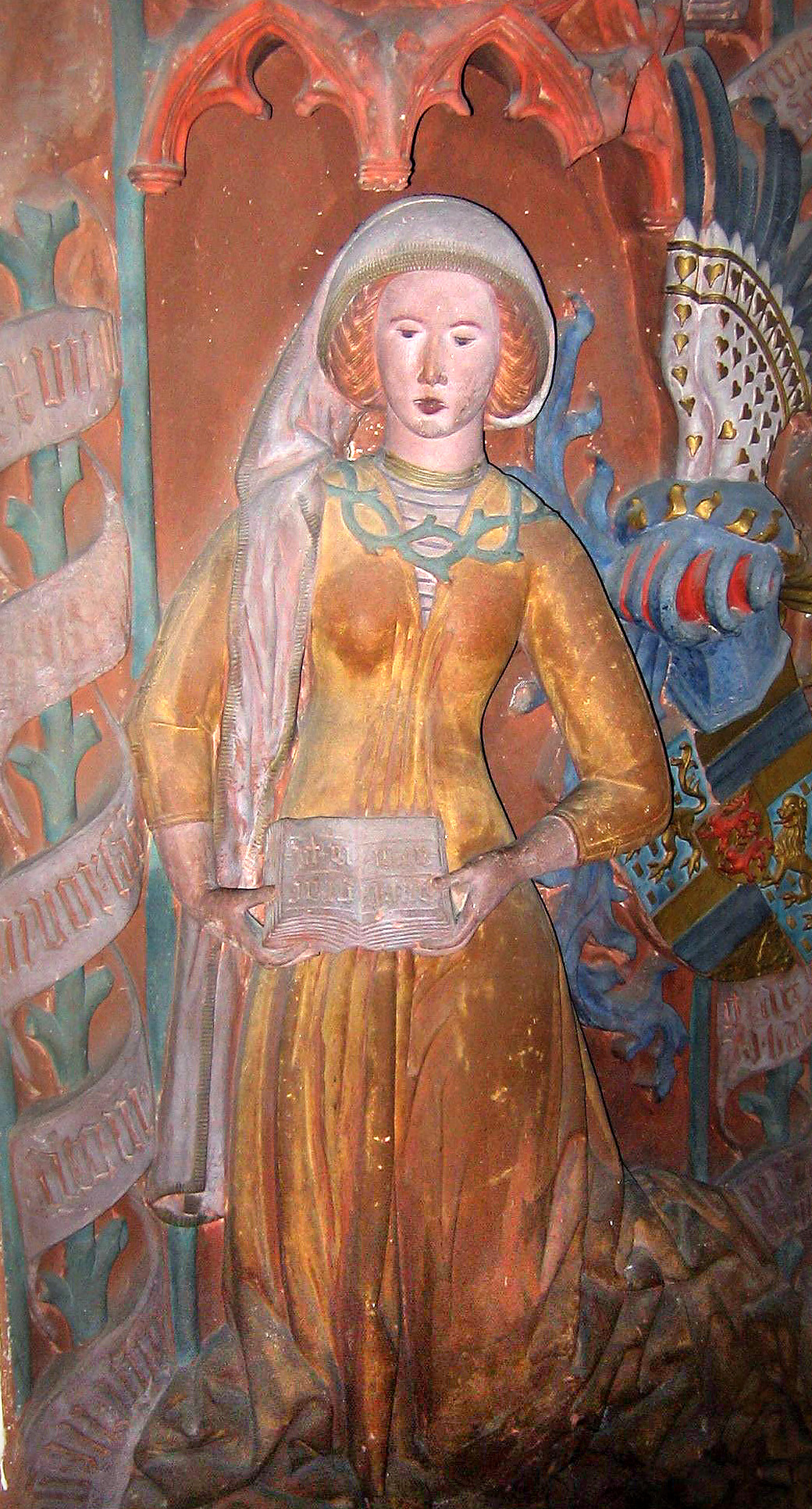
- Epitaph of Countess Adriana of Nassau-Siegen. Saint Mary's Church, Hanau. Photo: Reinhard Dietrich, 2009.

- Coat of arms
- Full name: Adriana Countess of Nassau-Siegen
- Native name: Adriana Gräfin von Nassau-Siegen
- Born: Adriana Gräfin zu Nassau, Vianden und Diez, Frau zu Breda; 7 February 1449; Breda
- Died: 15 January 1477 (aged 27)
- Buried: Saint Mary's Church, Hanau
- Noble family: House of Nassau-Siegen
- Spouse: Philip I of Hanau-Münzenberg
- Issue Detail: Adriana; Margaret; Reinhard IV; Anne; Mary
- Father: John IV of Nassau-Siegen
- Mother: Mary of Looz-Heinsberg

Countess Adriana of Nassau-Siegen (Note: In many sources she is called Adriana of Nassau-Dillenburg. The County of Nassau-Siegen is erroneously called Nassau-Dillenburg in many sources. The county was not named after the small, unimportant city of Dillenburg, which did not even have a church until 1491, but after the, for that time, large city of Siegen, the economic centre of the county and the counts' main residence. See Lück (1981), passim. It is also evident from the numbering of the reigning counts with the given name John. One John without regal number who ruled the County of Nassau-Dillenburg in the period 1303–1328, and eight counts by the name of John who ruled the County of Nassau-Siegen in the period 1362–1638.) (7 February 1449 – 15 January 1477), German: Adriana Gräfin von Nassau-Siegen, official titles: Gräfin zu Nassau, Vianden und Diez, Frau zu Breda, was a countess from the House of Nassau-Siegen, a cadet branch of the Ottonian Line of the House of Nassau, and through marriage Countess of Hanau-Münzenberg.

== Biography ==
Adriana was born in Breda on 7 February 1449 as the fourth daughter of Count John IV of Nassau-Siegen and his wife Lady Mary of Looz-Heinsberg.

Adriana married on 12 September 1468 to Count Philip I of Hanau-Münzenberg (21 September 1449 – 26 August 1500).

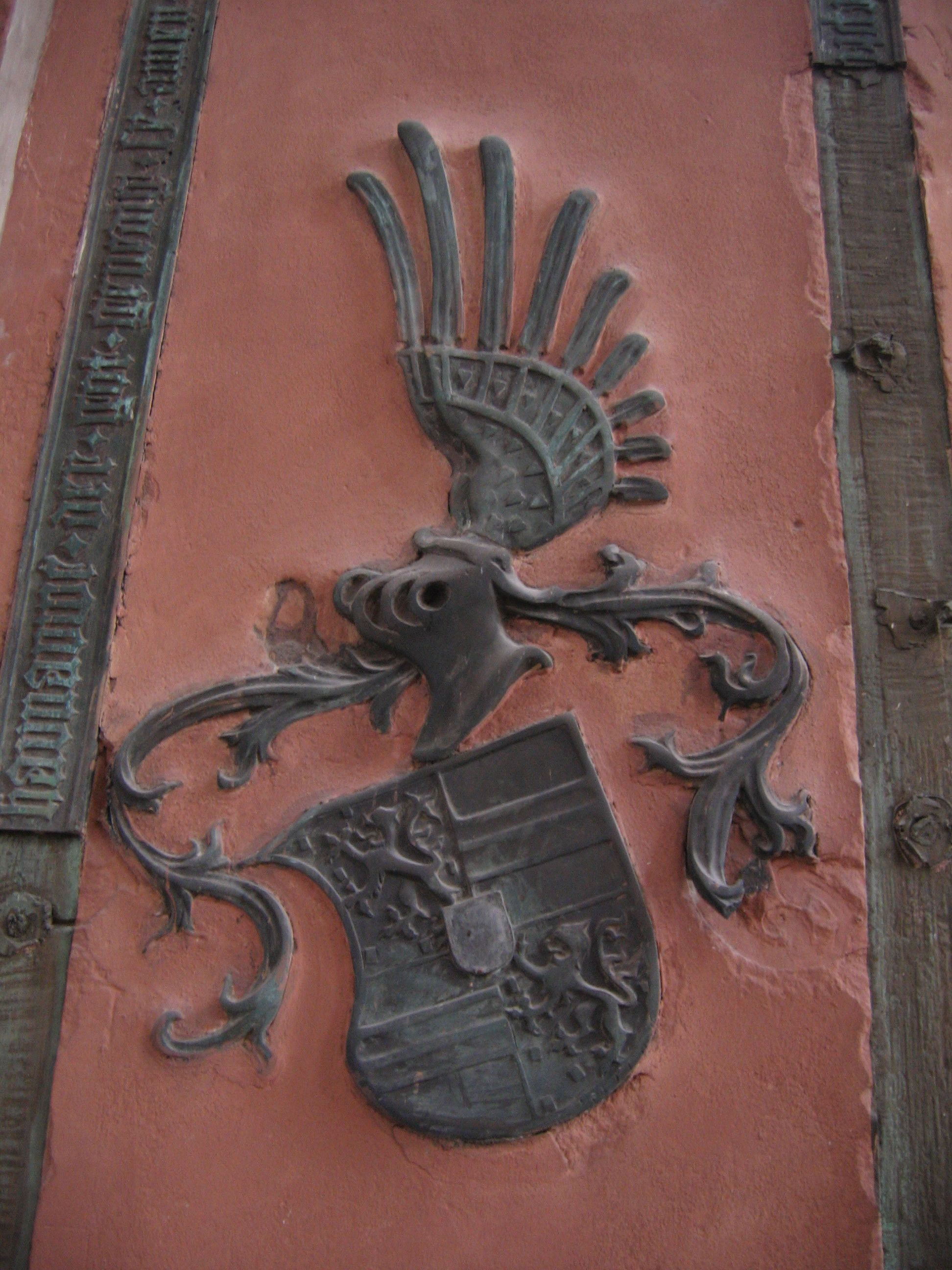
Adriana's coat of arms on her epitaph in Saint Mary's Church in Hanau.

Adriana died on 15 January 1477 (Note: The date of death 11 or 15 June 1477 in Schutte (1979), p. 42, and 11 June 1477 in Vorsterman van Oyen (1882), p. 94.) and was buried in Saint Mary's Church in Hanau. On her epitaph, she is depicted in a praying position towards the (no longer extant) high altar. This epitaph and her gravestone have been preserved very well.

== Issue ==
From the marriage of Adriana and Philip the following children were born:

1. A daughter (1469 – ?).
2. Adriana (Hanau, 1 May 1470 – 12 April 1524), married in Hanau on 15 February 1489 to Count Philip of Solms-Lich (15 August 1468 – Frankfurt, 3 October 1544).
3. Margaret (6 April 1471 – Liebenau monastery, 5 September 1503), was a nun at Liebenau monastery.
4. Count Reinhard IV (14 March 1473 – 30 January 1512), succeeded his father in 1500. He married in 1496 to Countess Catherine of Schwarzburg (d. 27 November 1514).
5. Anne (15 March 1474 – 21 March 1475).
6. Mary (4 March 1475 – 18 May 1476).

== Ancestors ==
Ancestors of Adriana of Nassau-Siegen
Great-great-grandparents	Otto II of Nassau-Siegen (c. 1305–1350/51) ⚭ 1331; Adelaide of Vianden (d. 1376)	Adolf II of the Mark (d. 1347) ⚭ 1332; Margaret of Cleves (d. after 1348)	John II of Polanen (d. 1378) ⚭ 1348; Oda of Horne (d. before 1353)	John II of Salm (d. after 1400) ⚭ after 1355; Philippa of Valkenburg (?–?)	John I of Heinsberg (d. 1334) ⚭ c. 1324; Catherine of Voorne (d. 1366)	William I of Jülich (d. 1362) ⚭ 1324; Joanna of Hainaut (1311/13–1374)	Bernhard of Solms (d. 1347/49) ⚭ ? (?–?)	Philip VI of Falkenstein (d. 1372/73) ⚭ before 1363; Agnes of Falkenstein (d. 1380)
Great-grandparents	John I of Nassau-Siegen (c. 1339–1416) ⚭ 1357; Margaret of the Mark (d. 1409)		John III of Polanen (d. 1394) ⚭ 1390; Odilia of Salm (d. 1428)		Godfrey II of Heinsberg (d. 1395) ⚭ 1357; Philippa of Jülich (d. 1390)		Otto I of Solms (d. 1410) ⚭ Agnes of Falkenstein (c. 1358–1409)	
Grandparents	Engelbert I of Nassau-Siegen (c. 1370–1442) ⚭ 1403; Joanne of Polanen (1392–1445)				John II of Looz-Heinsberg (d. 1438) ⚭ 1423; Anne of Solms (d. 1433)			
Parents	John IV of Nassau-Siegen (1410–1475) ⚭ 1440; Mary of Looz-Heinsberg (1424–1502)							

== Literature ==
- Lübbecke, Fried (1951). Hanau. Stadt u. Grafschaft (in German). Köln: Verlag E.A. Seemann.
- Zimmermann, Ernst J. (1978) [1903]. Hanau. Stadt und Land (in German) (3rd ed.). Hanau: Hans Peters Verlag. ISBN 3-87627-243-2.

== Sources ==
- Dek, A.W.E. (1970). Genealogie van het Vorstenhuis Nassau (in Dutch). Zaltbommel: Europese Bibliotheek.
- Dietrich, Reinhard & Heider-Geiß, Simone (2001). Die evangelische Marienkirche Hanau (in German). Kassel: Kirchenvorstand der Evangelischen Marienkirche Hanau. ISBN 3-89477-925-X.
- Huberty, Michel; Giraud, Alain & Magdelaine, F. & B. (1981). l'Allemagne Dynastique (in French). Vol. Tome III: Brunswick-Nassau-Schwarzbourg. Le Perreux: Alain Giraud. ISBN 2-901138-03-9.
- Lück, Alfred (1981) [1967]. Siegerland und Nederland (in German) (2nd ed.). Siegen: Siegerländer Heimatverein e.V.
- Schutte, O. (1979). "Genealogische gegevens". In Tamse, C.A. (ed.). Nassau en Oranje in de Nederlandse geschiedenis (in Dutch). Alphen aan den Rijn: A.W. Sijthoff. pp. 40–44. ISBN 90-218-2447-7.
- Suchier, Reinhard (1879). "Die Grabmonumente und Särge der in Hanau bestatteten Personen aus den Häusern Hanau und Hessen". Programm des Königlichen Gymnasiums zu Hanau (in German). Hanau: Waisenhaus Buchdruckerei. pp. 1–56.
- Suchier, Reinhard (1894). "Genealogie des Hanauer Grafenhauses". Festschrift des Hanauer Geschichtsvereins zu seiner fünfzigjährigen Jubelfeier am 27. August 1894 (in German). Hanau: G. Heydt.
- Vorsterman van Oyen, A.A. (1882). Het vorstenhuis Oranje-Nassau. Van de vroegste tijden tot heden (in Dutch). Leiden & Utrecht: A.W. Sijthoff & J.L. Beijers.

Adriana of Nassau-Siegen House of Nassau-Siegen Born: 7 February 1449 Died: 15 January 1477
Regnal titles
Vacant Title last held by Countess Palatine Margaret of Mosbach	Countess Consort of Hanau-Münzenberg; 12 September 1468 – 15 January 1477	Vacant Title next held by Catherine of Schwarzburg
