= John II of Loon =

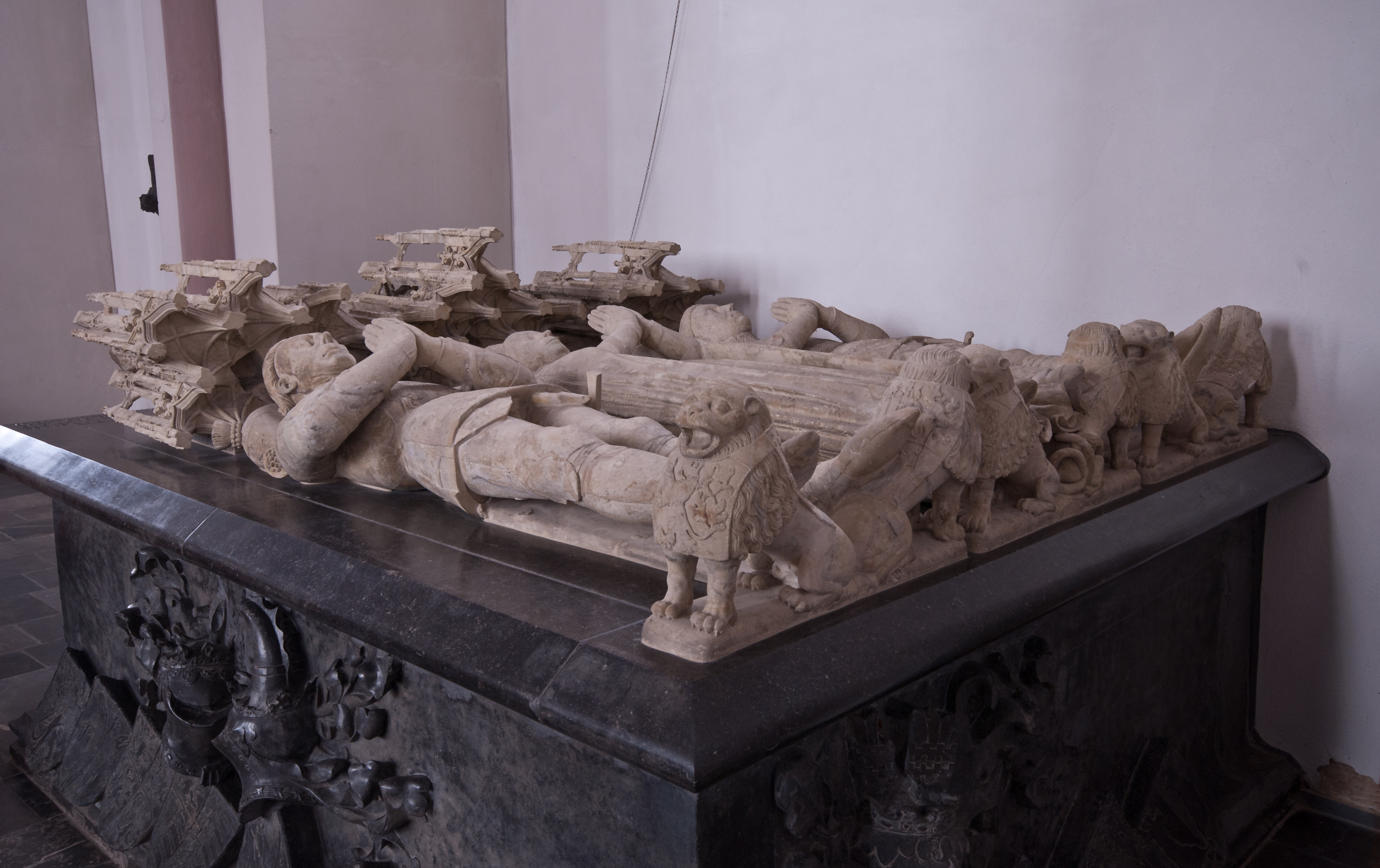
John II of Loon

John II of Loon (died 1438), Lord of Jülich, Heinsberg and Löwenberg (Herr zu Julich und Heinsberg), son of Godfrey de Heinsberg, Count of Looz, and Philippa of Jülich, daughter of William V, Duke of Jülich, and Joanna of Hainaut. Although John was the first son of Godfrey, he did not inherit the countship of Looz, the title instead going to Arnold of Rumingy.

John married first Margaret (Margareta van Gennep, died 1419) and second Anna of Solms (d. 1433) Countess of Solms-Braunfels. John and Margaret had four children:

- Johann III (died before 1441), married Walpurg von Mörs. Their daughter Margaret married Philip II of Nassau-Weilburg.
- Wilhelm I (died 24 April 1439), married Elizabeth von Blankenheim, daughter of Gerhard IX, Count of Blankenheim, great-great-grandson of Gerard I, Count of Durbuy.
- John of Heinsberg (died 1459), Bishop of Liège (1419-1455)
- Philippa (died 1464), married Wilhelm von Wied-Isenburg.

John and Anna of Solms-Braunfels had two children:

- Mary, married John IV, Count of Nassau-Siegen
- Jacoba (died 1466), Abbess of Thorn.

Among the descendants of John (through Maria of Loon-Heinsberg) were Juliane of Nassau-Dillenburg and William the Silent, Prince of Orange.

== Sources ==
- Arlette Laret-Kayser, Entre Bar et Luxembourg : Le Comté de Chiny des Origines à 1300, Bruxelles (éditions du Crédit Communal, Collection Histoire, série in-8°, n° 72), 1986
- Marchandisse, Alain, La fonction épiscopale à Liège aux xiiie et xive siècles: étude de politologie historique, Bibliothèque de la Faculté de Philosophie et de Lettres de l'Université de Liège, 1998
