= Hanau-Münzenberg =

County in the Holy Roman Empire

County of Hanau-Münzenberg Grafschaft Hanau-Münzenberg
- 1458 – 1785
- Coat of arms
- Status: State of the Holy Roman Empire
- Capital: Hanau
- Common languages: Hessian
- Government: County
- History
  - Established: 1458
  - Disestablished: 1785 (1821)
Preceded by	Succeeded by
County of Hanau / County of Hanau	Landgraviate of Hesse-Cassel / Landgraviate of Hesse-Cassel; Landgraviate of Hesse-Darmstadt / Landgraviate of Hesse-Darmstadt
- Roman Catholic; from 16th-century Calvinist, from mid 17th-century mixed Calvinist and Lutheran; ruled by counts; language: German

The County of Hanau-Münzenberg was a territory within the Holy Roman Empire. It emerged when the County of Hanau was divided in 1458, the other part being the county of Hanau-Lichtenberg. Due to common heirs, both counties were merged from 1642 to 1685 and from 1712 to 1736. In 1736 the last member of the House of Hanau died and the Landgrave of Hessen-Kassel inherited the county.

== Geography ==
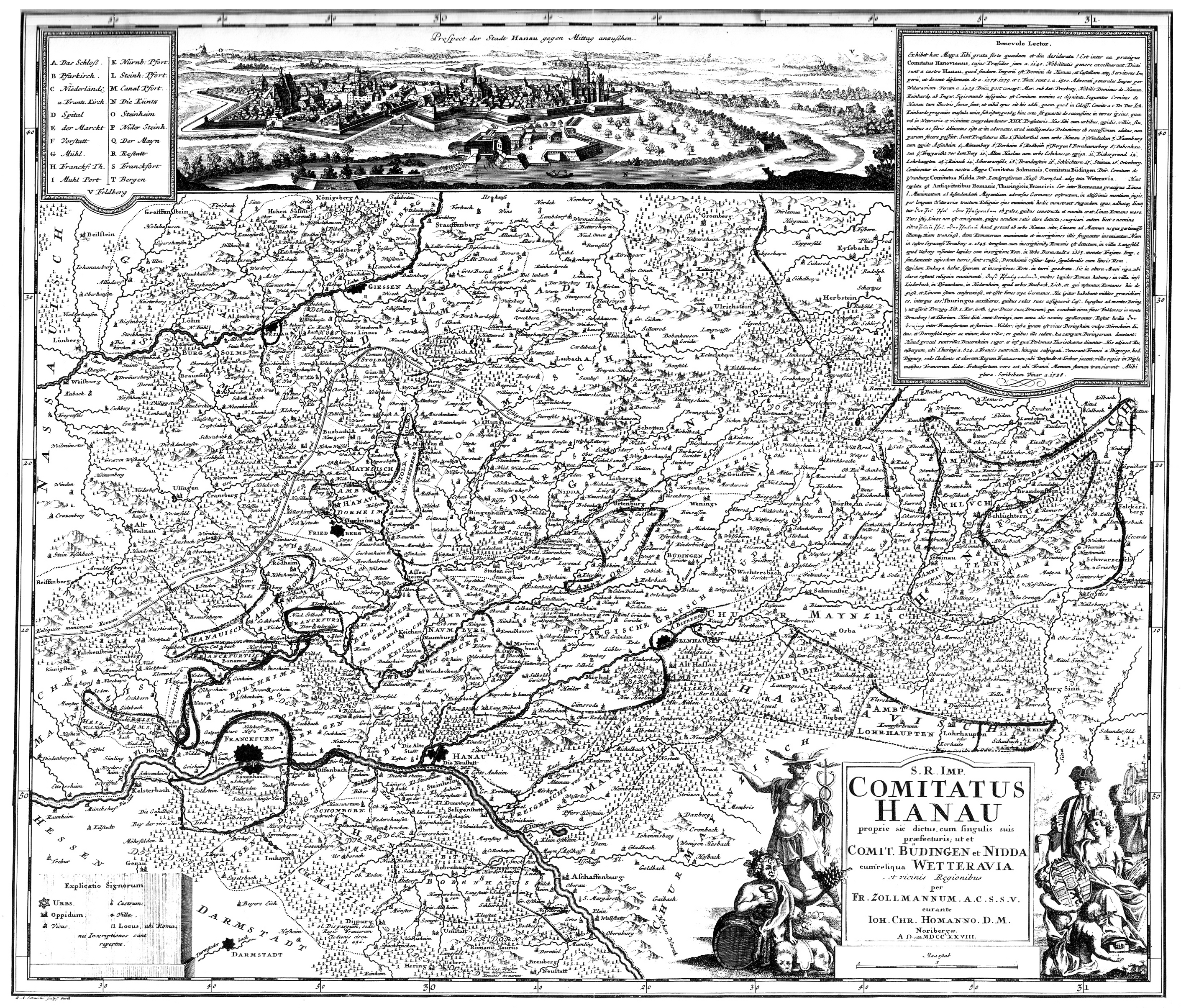
Map of the county Hanau-Münzenberg by Friedrich Zollmann 1728

The county of Hanau-Münzenberg was positioned to the north of the river Main stretching from the West of Frankfurt am Main eastwards through the valley of the river Kinzig to Schlüchtern and into the Spessart mountains to Partenstein. The capital was the town of Hanau. The counts had also castles in Windecken (disused after the 16th century) and Steinau an der Straße.

For the following years population counts of Hanau-Münzenberg do exist:

- 1632: 5,140 families
- 1707: 6,706 families
- 1754: 48,000 inhabitants

== History ==
=== Emergence ===
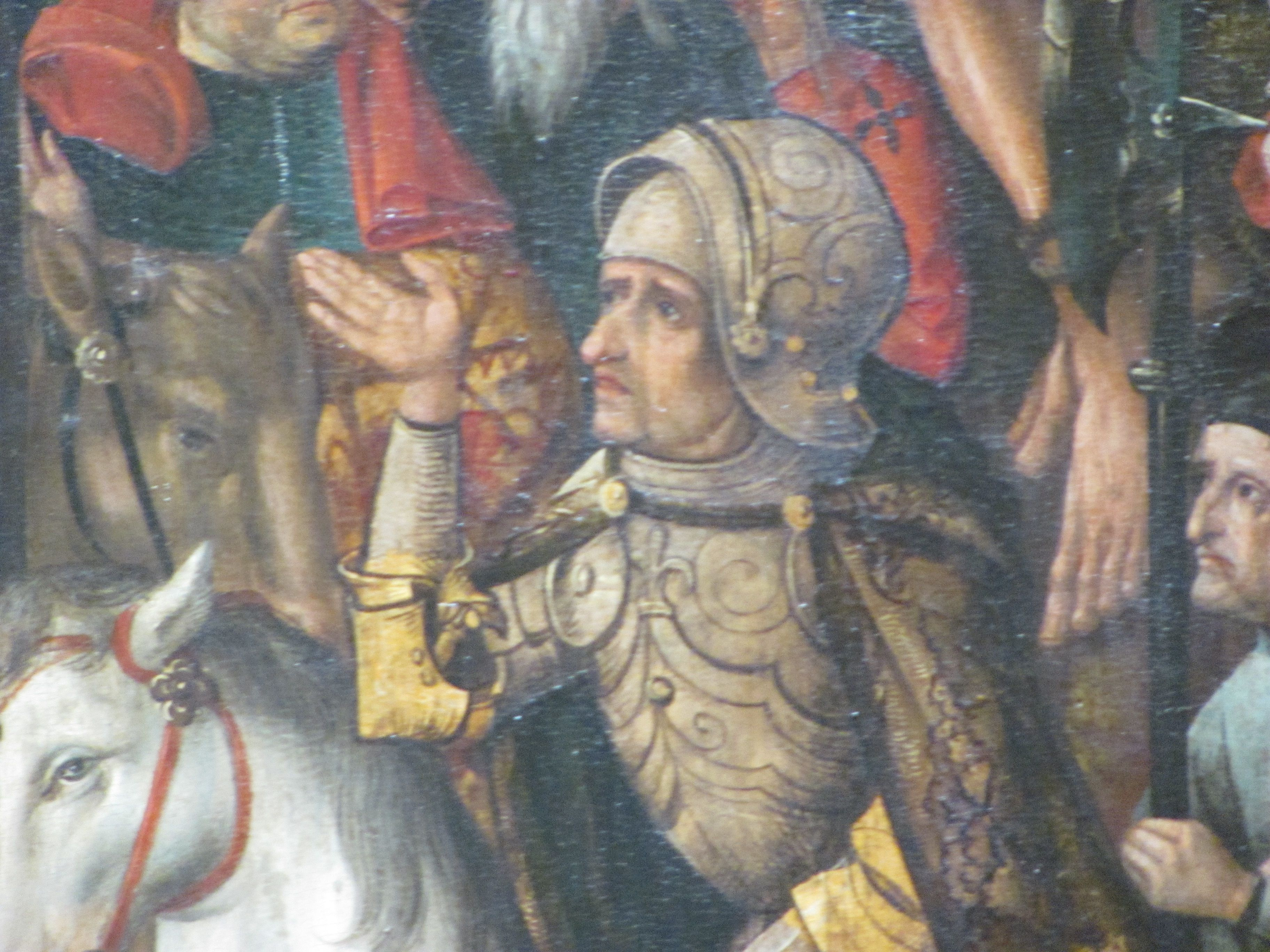
Philipp I (The Younger) on an altarpiece in Wörth am Main

In 1452, after a reign of only one year, Count Reinhard III of Hanau (1412–1452) died. The heir was his son, Philip I (the Younger) (1449–1500), only four years old. For the sake of the continuity of the dynasty after years of political fighting, his relatives and other important decision-makers in the county agreed not to turn to the 1375 primogenitur statute of the family – one of the oldest in Germany – but to separate the administrative district of Babenhausen from the county of Hanau and let the heir's uncle and brother of the deceased, Philip I (the Elder) (1417–1480), have it in his own right as a county. This arrangement of 1458 allowed him to have a befitting marriage and offspring entitled to inherit, and so increased the chances of survival of the comital house. This created the Line of Hanau-Lichtenberg. Later on – to distinguish the "old" county from Hanau-Lichtenberg – the part of the county which stayed with Philip I (the Younger) was called Hanau-Münzenberg.

The History of Hanau-Münzenberg is dominated by a large series of guardianships for counts still minor when inheriting the county from their fathers: Without interruption this happened during six accessions between 1512 and 1638. Always the counts died in their late 20th or 30th leaving behind a minor as successor. Most probably the reason was a hereditary disease. The effect of this was that the politics of expansion which on the long term dominated the success of the Lordship of Hanau and later the county of Hanau came to a halt when Philip I (the Younger) died in 1500.

=== First Reformation ===
Slowly but early Hanau-Münzenberg participated in the Reformation, to be exact: its Lutheran version. The reformation was introduced gradually during the reign of Philipp II: when church staff retired, their successor would be a Lutheran. As early as 1523, the pastor Adolf Arborgast was included in the chapter of the St. Mary's Church in Hanau, the central church of the county. When he was appointed, he explained that he wanted to spend little effort on vespers and the daily mass, but would instead concentrate on his sermons and putting forward the Gospel. The real reformer of Hanau was his successor Philipp Neunheller MA; during his time in office, the new faith gained more and more ground. The Catholic faith was never officially banned. The number of Catholic priests steadily decreased, as they were not replaced when they retired.

Also under the reign of Philipp II started the project to replace the mediaeval fortifications of the town of Hanau by the latest in Renaissance-fortification available. This investment became necessary due to the introduction of modern artillery the mediaeval fortification could not withstand. The new walls were placed outside the mediaeval ones and included a settlement, "Vorstadt", which had developed outside the gates.

=== Second Reformation ===
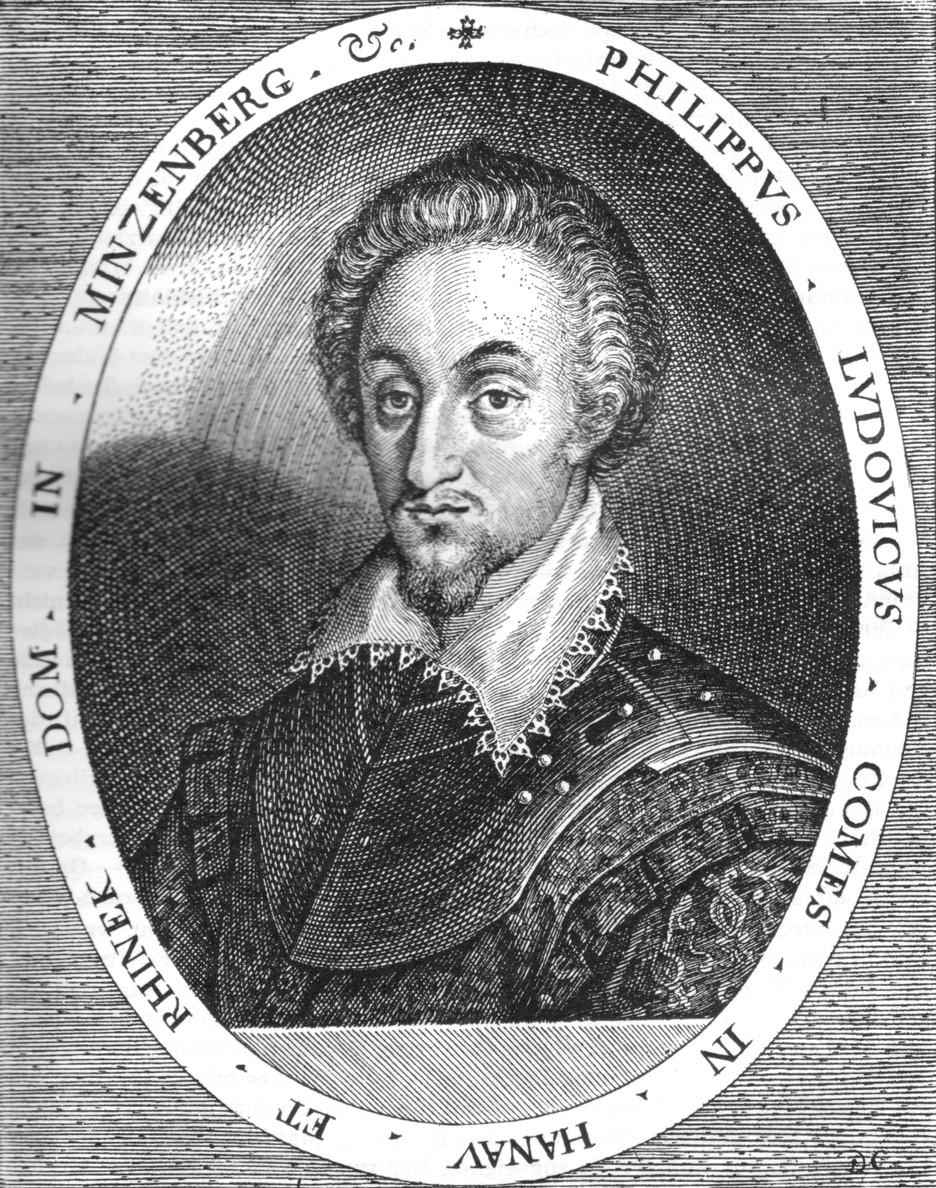
Philipp Ludwig II

When Philipp Ludwig I died in 1580 another guardianship had to be installed for the benefit of his successor, Philipp Ludwig II, still a minor. Guardians became the Counts John VI, Count of Nassau-Dillenburg (1536–1606), Louis I, Count of Sayn-Wittgenstein (1568–1607) and Philipp IV, Count of Hanau-Lichtenberg (1514–1590), who was replaced in 1585 by his son, Count Philipp V of Hanau-Lichtenberg (1541–1599). The dominating figure in this constellation became the Count of Nassau. Additionally Philipp Ludwig's widowed mother, Countess Magdalene of Waldeck-Wildungen, remarried on 9 December 1581 Count John VII, the Middle, of Nassau-Siegen (1561–1623), the son of Count John IV. In consequence Philipp Ludwig II and his younger brother, Count Albrecht, joined the Nassau-Dillenburg court, a centre of the Reformation movement in Germany and closely tied to the Electorate of the Palatinate of the Rhine. The new ideas he encountered here greatly influenced his life and policies. By using his rights under the Cuius regio, eius religio rule, he changed the confession of his county to Calvinism in 1593. He succeeded with this nearly everywhere in his sphere of influence, except in a few villages in the district Bornheimerberg, which surrounded Frankfurt and the condominiums shared with the Roman Catholic archbishop-elector of Mainz. The villages in the vicinity of Frankfurt had strong ties to this (mainly) Lutheran city and a majority of the villagers just went to Lutheran services in "foreign" Frankfurt territory. Also in the condominiums Philipp Ludwig II shared with Mainz he couldn't change anything — whether his subjects had become Lutheran during the reformation or had remained Roman Catholic.

With his marriage in 1596 to Katharina Belgica, third daughter of William the Silent, he gained a personal connection to one of the leading personalities of Calvinism in Europe.

=== Modernisation ===
The introduction of Calvinism and the location of the County of Hanau-Münzenberg, at only half a day's journey away from Frankfurt with its trade fairs, made Hanau an attractive place to settle for Calvinist refugees from France and later from the Southern Netherlands. They were often wealthy traders and were attractive subjects for a ruler in need of tax revenues. In 1597 and 1604, the count and the refugees entered into two treaties which gave them a large degree of self-government and founded the "New Town" of Hanau, south to the historic mediaeval settlement. This proved to be a big success and initiated an economic growth for Hanau which lasted even into the 19th century. Both the towns, "Old Hanau" and "New Hanau" were surrounded by a modern fortification of baroque style. This proved to be a first class asset in the following Thirty Years' War (1618–1648).

Philipp Ludwig II also reinstated a Jewish community in Hanau. Space was allocated for the Jews on the southern fortifications of the historic town, which was no longer needed, due to the new fortifications. This Ghetto was not part of one either town, but placed directly under the administrative control of the county.

Count Philipp Ludwig II also tried to get a university for his county by founding the "Hohe Landesschule" in Hanau. It was modeled on the Herborn Academy, where he had studied himself. Even so, it did not develop into a university but still exists today as a secondary school.

=== Thirty Years' War ===
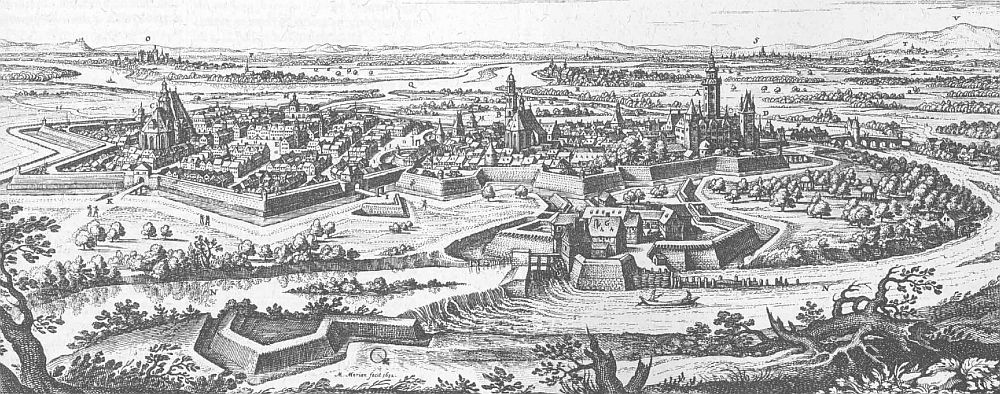
Hanau during Thirty Years' War

The Calvinist county initially joined the forces of the Calvinist Frederick V but had to surrender to the emperor and the Roman Catholic forces. The reigning count, now Philipp Moritz, chose to change sides, in order to retain the military command of his capital. He was appointed Colonel and was expected to provide three companies. In November 1631, Swedish troops occupied Hanau and King Gustavus Adolphus of Sweden entered the city. Philipp Moritz decided to change sides for the second time. He was a Calvinist and for him choosing between the Roman Catholic Emperor and the Lutheran Swedish king may have been like a choice between Scylla and Charybdis. Gustavus Adolphus appointed him to colonel and gave him a Swedish regiment. As a reward for his changing sides, he gave him the district of Orb, the shares the Electorate of Mainz had held in the former County of Rieneck and the districts of Partenstein, Lohrhaupten, Bieber and Alzenau. He gave Philipp Moritz's brothers, Heinrich Ludwig (1609–1632) and Jakob Johann (1612–1636) the town and district of Steinheim, which was also a former possession of Mainz. These possessions were lost when the Catholic side gained the upper hand after the Battle of Nördlingen in September 1634. Changing sides again would have made Philipp Moritz seem untrustworthy. So he decided to flee to Metz and from there via Chalon, Rouen and Amsterdam to his Orange-Nassau relatives in the Hague and Delft. He left his youngest brother, Jakob Johann, as regent in Hanau, because Jakob Johann was considered politically neutral. Hanau as a well-developed fortress remained occupied by Swedish troops under General Jakob von Ramsay until 1638, who controlled the surrounding countryside from Hanau. He excluded Jakob Johann from any influence and so the later left the town too.

From September 1635 to June 1636, Hanau was unsuccessfully besieged by imperial troops under General Guillaume de Lamboy. This siege proved the value of the modern defensive system, which had been constructed only a few years before. Thousands of refugees fled from the surrounding villages into the town. Hans Jakob Christoffel von Grimmelshausen used the occupation of Hanau by the Swedish and the siege as background in his picaresque novel Simplicius Simplicissimus. After a nine-month siege, the city was relieved by an army under Landgrave Wilhelm V of Hesse-Kassel. He was Philipp Moritz's brother-in-law, as he had married Philipp Moritz's sister, Amalie Elisabeth. A church service was held annually to commemorate the relief. After 1800, this developed into an annual Lamboy festival.

In 1637, Philipp Moritz reconciled with the new Emperor, Ferdinand III and changed sides again. He returned to Hanau on 17 December 1637. General Ramsay ignored this and interned Philipp Moritz in his own Castle in Hanau. However, on 11 February [O.S. 2 February] 1638 the Wetterau Association of Imperial Counts, an association predominated by Calvinists, staged a coup against the Swedes and restored Philipp Moritz to power. General Ramsay was arrested and taken to Dillenburg, where he died months later from injuries sustained during the action. But also Count Philipp Moritz died only months after gaining power again.

=== First reunion ===
Philipp Moritz was succeeded by the last two counts of Hanau-Münzenberg: Philipp Ludwig III, still a boy nine years old when dying in 1641 and Johann Ernst, Count of Hanau-Münzenberg-Schwarzenfels, a cousin, dying childless after less than three months in office. With him the House of Hanau-Münzenberg became extinct.

==== Policies ====
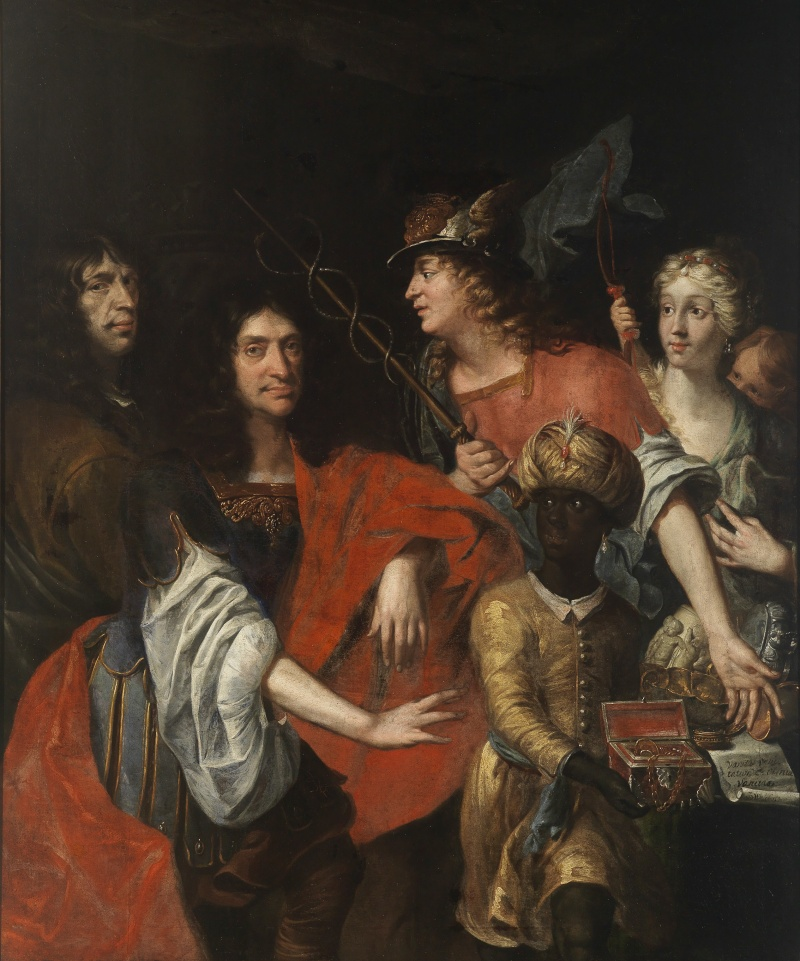
Johann David Welcker: Allegory on the acquisition of Surinam by Count Friedrich Casimir of Hanau in 1669. (1676) Staatliche Kunsthalle Karlsruhe. Inventary # 1164.

Heir to it was Count Friedrich Casimir, Count of Hanau-Lichtenberg, then still a minor under the guardianship of Georg II of Fleckenstein-Dagstuhl. The relation to count Johann Ernst was quite remote and the inheritance endangered in more than one way: The inheritance happened during the final years of Thirty Years' War, the feudal Overlords of Hanau-Münzenberg were partly enemy to Hanau and tried to hold back fiefs traditionally held by Hanau-Münzenberg. Further, the county of Hanau-Münzenberg was of Reformed Confession, Friedrich Casimir and the county of Hanau-Lichtenberg were Lutheran. And even to reach the capital of Hanau-Münzenberg, the town of Hanau, proved a problem: Friedrich Casimir could do so only in disguise. The inheritance could finally be secured by two treaties:

- Parties to the first one of 1642 were Friedrich Casimir and the wealthy bourgeoisie of Hanau. The count granted the reformed faith as state religion within Hanau-Münzenberg only reserving Lutheran services for himself and his court. Therefore, the citizens of Hanau – by far the strongest power within the war-devastated county – supported the accession of Friedrich Casimir.
- Parties to the second one of 1643 were Friedrich Casimir and Landgravine Amalie Elisabeth of Hessen-Kassel, née countess of Hanau-Münzenberg, daughter to Philipp Ludwig II, Count of Hanau-Münzenberg. She granted military and diplomatic support against the still resistant overlords. Therefore, Friedrich Casimir granted – should the house of Hanau be without male heirs – the inheritance of Hanau-Münzenberg to the descendants of Amalie Elisabeth. That actually happened in 1736.

These treaties secured the unification of the two Hanau counties under one ruler and saved Hanau-Münzenberg as a unit.

Against the treaty of accession of 1642 Friedrich Casimir tried to enlarge the influence of the Lutherans within Hanau-Münzenberg: During the first twenty years of his reign, the Lutheran services were limited to the chapel of his castle in Hanau. But due to growing numbers from 1658 to 1662 an own church building for the Lutherans was erected in the town against the protest of the reformed majority, the Johanneskirche. Both parties struggled against each other for decades, tried to prevent – unsuccessfully – "mixed marriages" and even fought one another. An additional treaty of 1670 allowed the Lutherans their own church-organisation. This resulted in two parallel churches within the county of Hanau-Münzenberg each one having its own administration. Therefore, a lot of villages in Hanau-Münzenberg had a set of reformed church, school, vicarage and cemetery and another one for the Lutherans. Only the Enlightenment and the economic crises resulting out of the Napoleonic Wars let to the Hanau Union which ended this double structure in 1818.

Sibylle Christine of Anhalt-Dessau, the widow of Count Philipp Moritz, had received Steinau Castle as her dowager seat. As widow of a ruling count, she could raise substantial claims against the county. To avoid this, it was decided to marry Friedrich Casimir to the widow, who was 44 years old at the time, almost 20 years older than him. An added advantage of this marriage was that she was a Calvinist which calmed the majority of the population. The marriage with the elderly widow was plagued by differences and remained childless. Shortly before his death, Friedrich Casimir adopted his nephew count Philipp Reinhard.

==== Economy ====
Friedrich Casimir tried to implement mercantilism into Hanau-Münzenberg severely devastated by the effects of Thirty Years' War. A leading role in this is claimed for his adviser Johann Becher. A successful achievement was the foundation of a factory to produce Faience, the first in Germany. On the other hand, the count's extravagant initiative to lease Guiana from the Dutch West India Company was a devastating experiment. These Hanauish Indies (Hanauisch-Indien) never became a reality but let his county to the rim of bankruptcy. So in 1670 his nearest relatives staged a palace revolution trying to kick Friedrich Casimir out of office. This did not work entirely. But Friedrich Casimir was put under the guardianship of his relatives by emperor Leopold and the count's possibilities to stage new experiments were severely curtailed.

=== Separated again ===
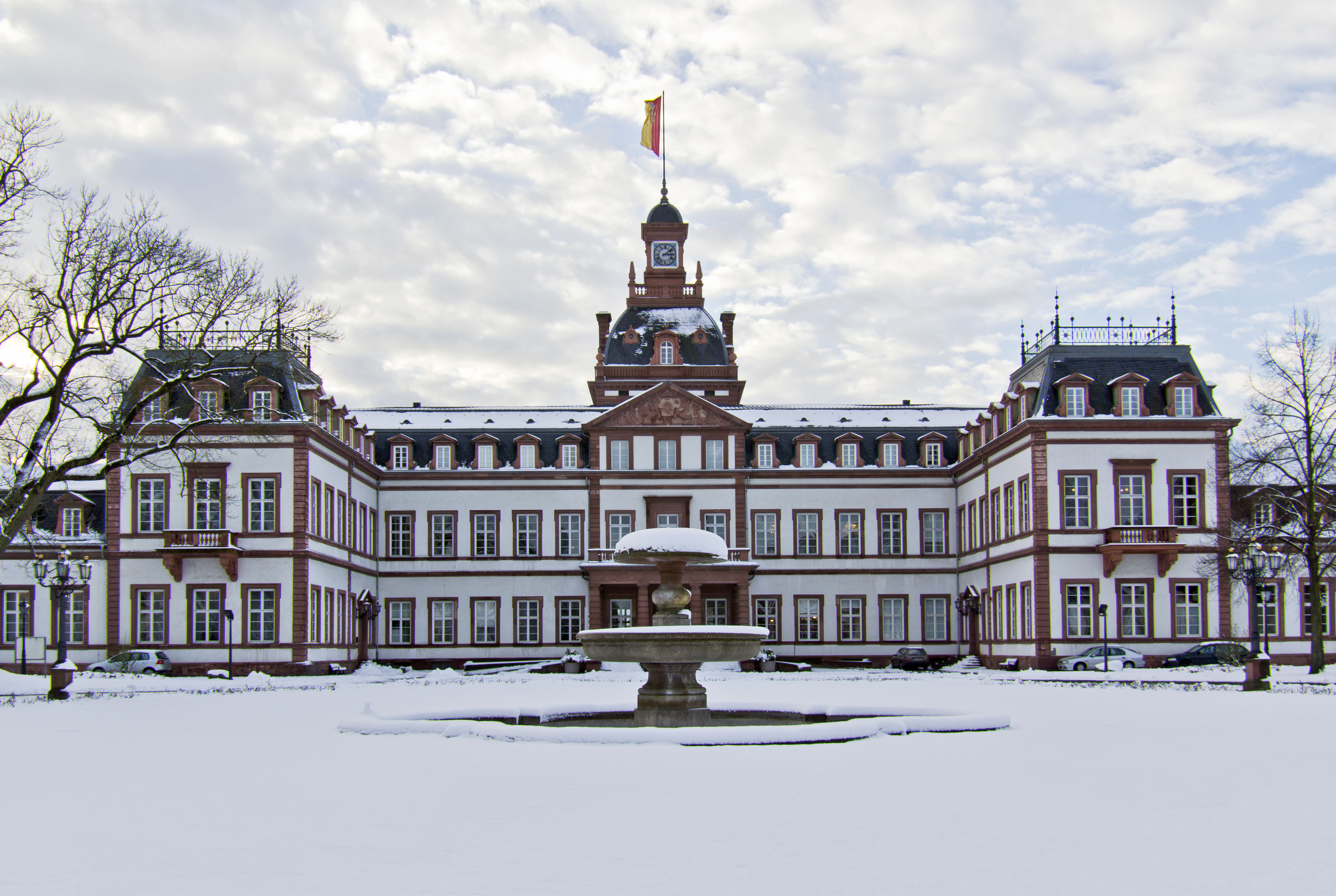
Philippsruhe Castle in Hanau

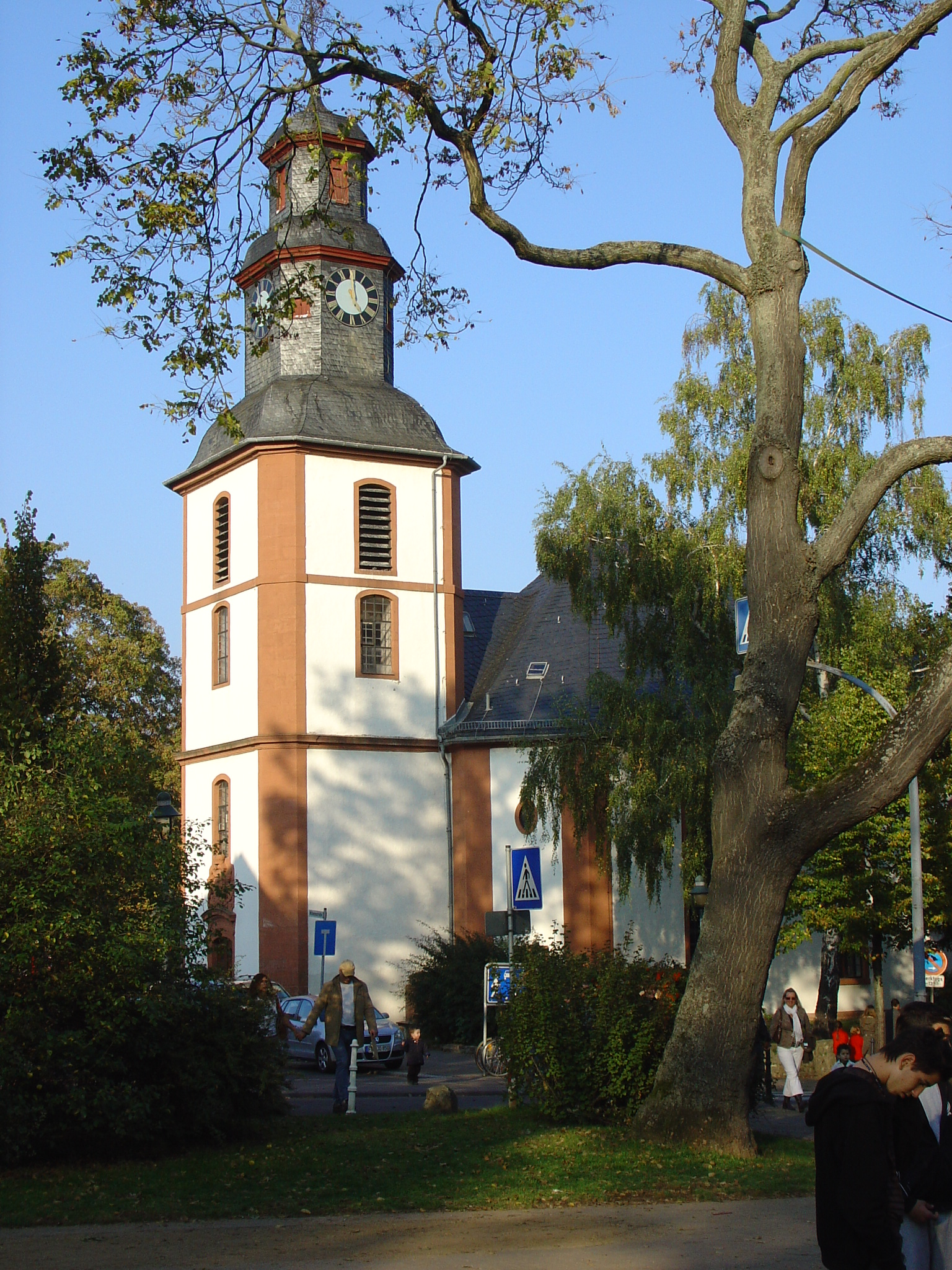
Wilhelmskirche in Bad Nauheim then a village within the county of Hanau-Münzenberg. This was the first and Calvinist church of the village.

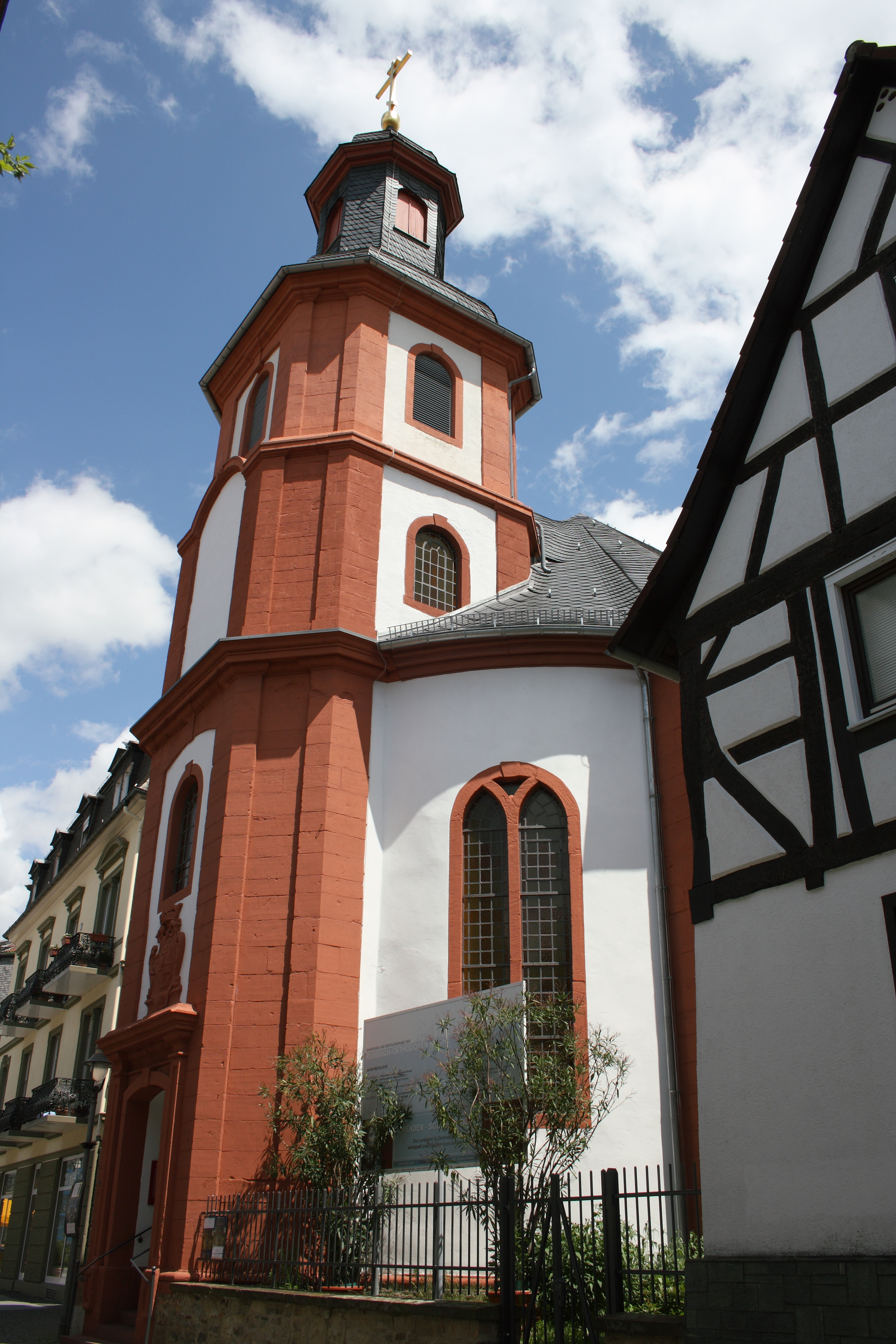
Reinhardskirche in Bad Nauheim, second and formerly Lutheran church, is today used by the Russian Orthodox Church.

Friedrich Casimir died in 1685. His inheritance was divided between his two nephews, count Philipp Reinhard, who inherited Hanau-Münzenberg and count Johann Reinhard III, who inherited Hanau-Lichtenberg. Both were sons of Friedrich Casimir's brother Count Johann Reinhard II. So Hanau-Münzenberg was on his own again. It was then still in a phase of recovery from the devastations of Thirty Years' War but also some remarkable achievements took place. There was a lot of public building, for government, including Philippsruhe Castle, and church: In lots of villages a second, Lutheran church was erected and often called Reinhardskirche after the reigning count.

=== Second reunion ===
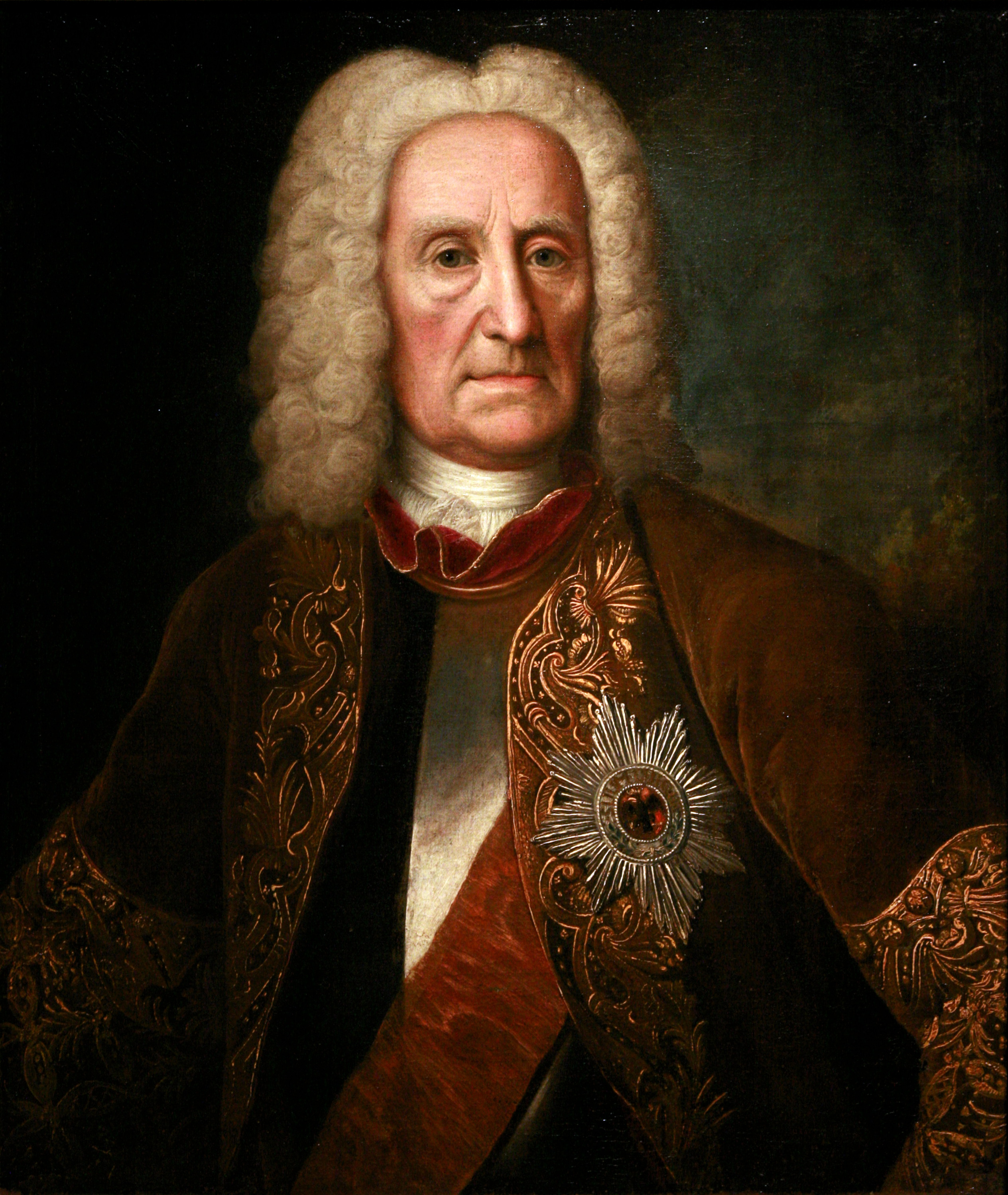
Johann Reinhard III of Hanau – last of the House of Hanau

When Count Philipp Reinhard died in 1712 Count Johann Reinhard III inherited the county of Hanau-Münzenberg and for the last time, both counties were united into one county of Hanau. With Count Johann Reinhard III the last male member of the Hanau family died in 1736. Hanau-Münzenberg and Hanau-Lichtenberg fell to different heirs: Due to the treaty of succession of 1643 Hanau-Münzenberg was inherited by the Landgraviate of Hesse-Kassel, Hanau-Lichtenberg fell to the Landgraviate of Hesse-Darmstadt because Countess Charlotte of Hanau-Lichtenberg, the only daughter of Johann Reinhard III, was married to the heir of Hesse-Darmstadt, reigning as landgrave Louis VIII later.

Regarding the question if the administrative district of Babenhausen was part of Hanau-Münzenberg or Hanau-Lichtenberg nearly lead into a war of both landgraviates in 1736 and into an extensive lawsuit at the highest courts of the Holy Roman Empire. The lawsuit ended with a compromise to divide the administrative district of Babenhausen into two equal parts between them in 1762. But it took until 1771 to realize this.

=== Secundogeniture within the Landgraviate of Hessen-Kassel ===
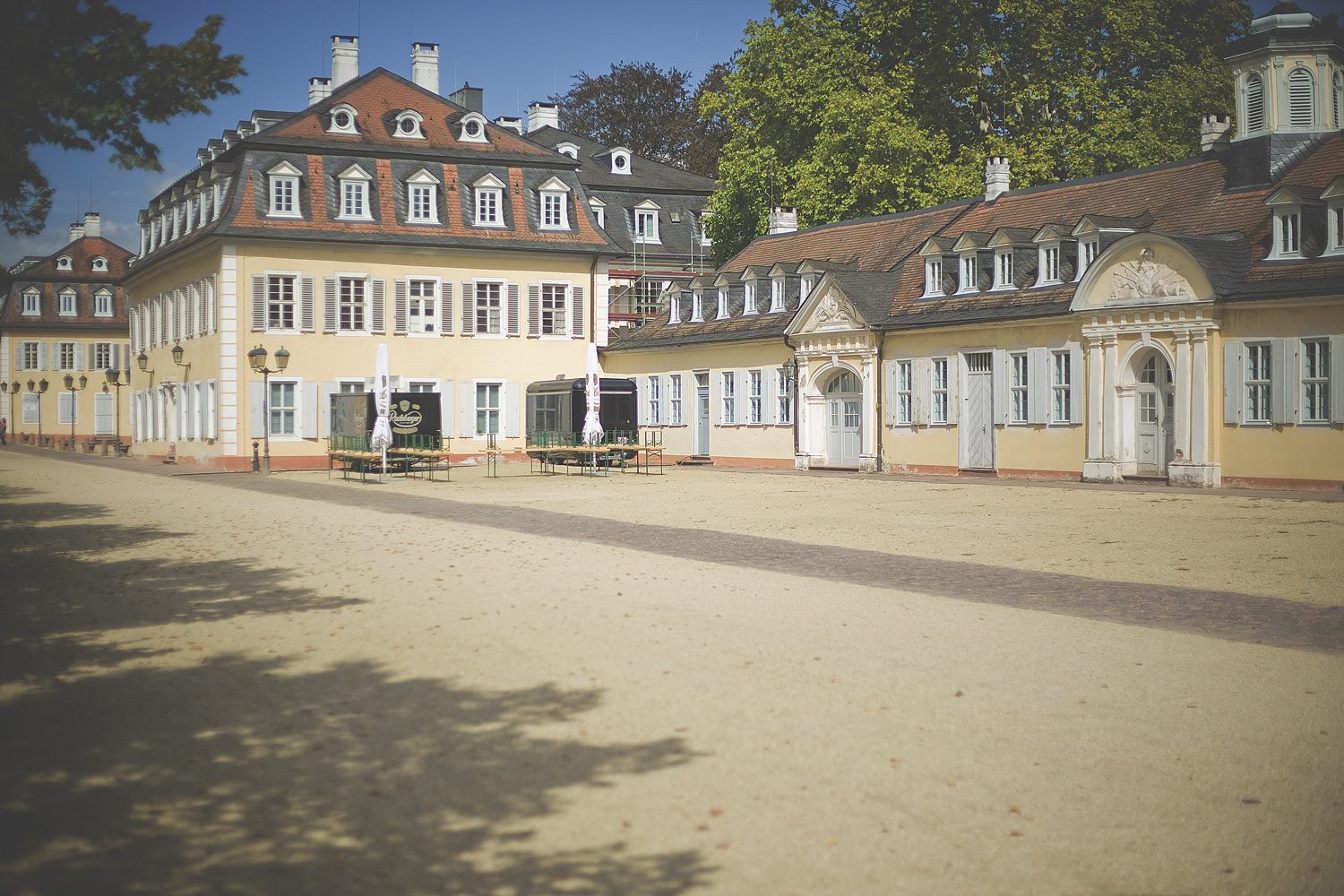
Spa of Wilhelmsbad greeted by William IX. of Hessen-Kassel as count of Hanau-Münzenberg

When the inheritance came to Hessen-Kassel technically Frederick I was sovereign there. But he had become King of Sweden, and so had placed his younger Brother William VIII in charge of the Landgraviate. Frederick I waived his inheritance of Hanau-Münzenberg in favour of his younger brother. So Wilhelm VIII became Count of Hanau-Münzenberg in his own right. In 1751 King Frederick died and William VIII succeeded him as Landgrave in Kassel. The next heir, Frederick II had secretly become Roman Catholic. When his father received this news finally he was not amused at all: He tried to secure that Frederick II couldn't change the confession of his lands in any thinkable way. One measure he took was to make Hanau-Münzenberg a secundogeniture of Hesse-Cassel known as Hesse-Hanau, and transfer it immediately to his grandson, William IX. William, still a minor when his grandfather died was put under the guardianship of his mother, Princess Mary of Great Britain, a daughter of King George II of Great Britain, excluding her Roman Catholic husband. So Hesse-Hanau was governed by Princess Mary from 1760 to 1764 and afterward by her son William IX. Only in 1785 he succeeded in Hessen-Kassel. So for nearly half a century after the acquisition of Hanau-Münzenberg by Hessen-Kassel in 1736 it stayed a separate most of the time. Only from 1786 on the integration into the Landgraviate took place gradually.

Wilhelm IX used his reign in Hesse-Hanau of more than 20 years to develop his own policies. He took to building and developing the economy – most representative for this becoming the amusement facility of Wilhelmsbad east of Hanau. And he started here with renting troops to the British Crown. Later on, a contingent of about 2,400 soldiers recruited in Hesse-Hanau served during the American Revolutionary War for King George III, an uncle to William IX.

During this time the brothers Grimm were born in Hanau.

=== Principality of Hanau ===
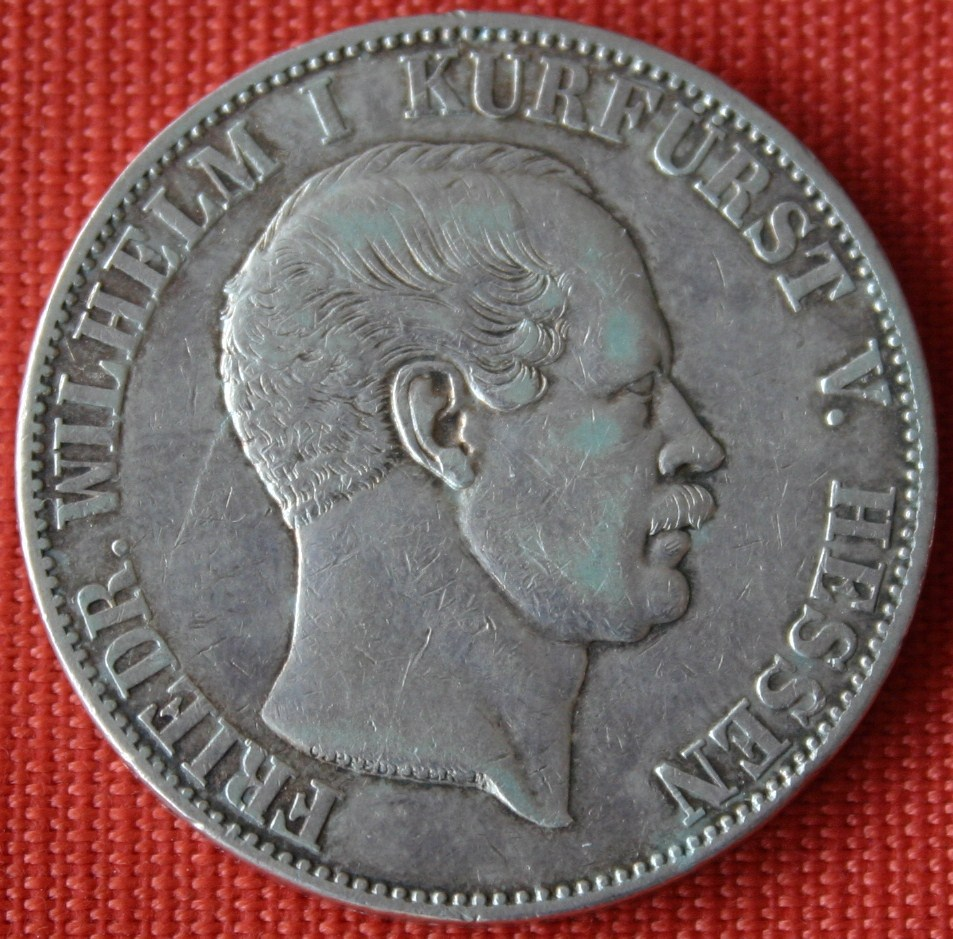
Friedrich Wilhelm, the last Elector of Hessen on a 1-Thaler-coin

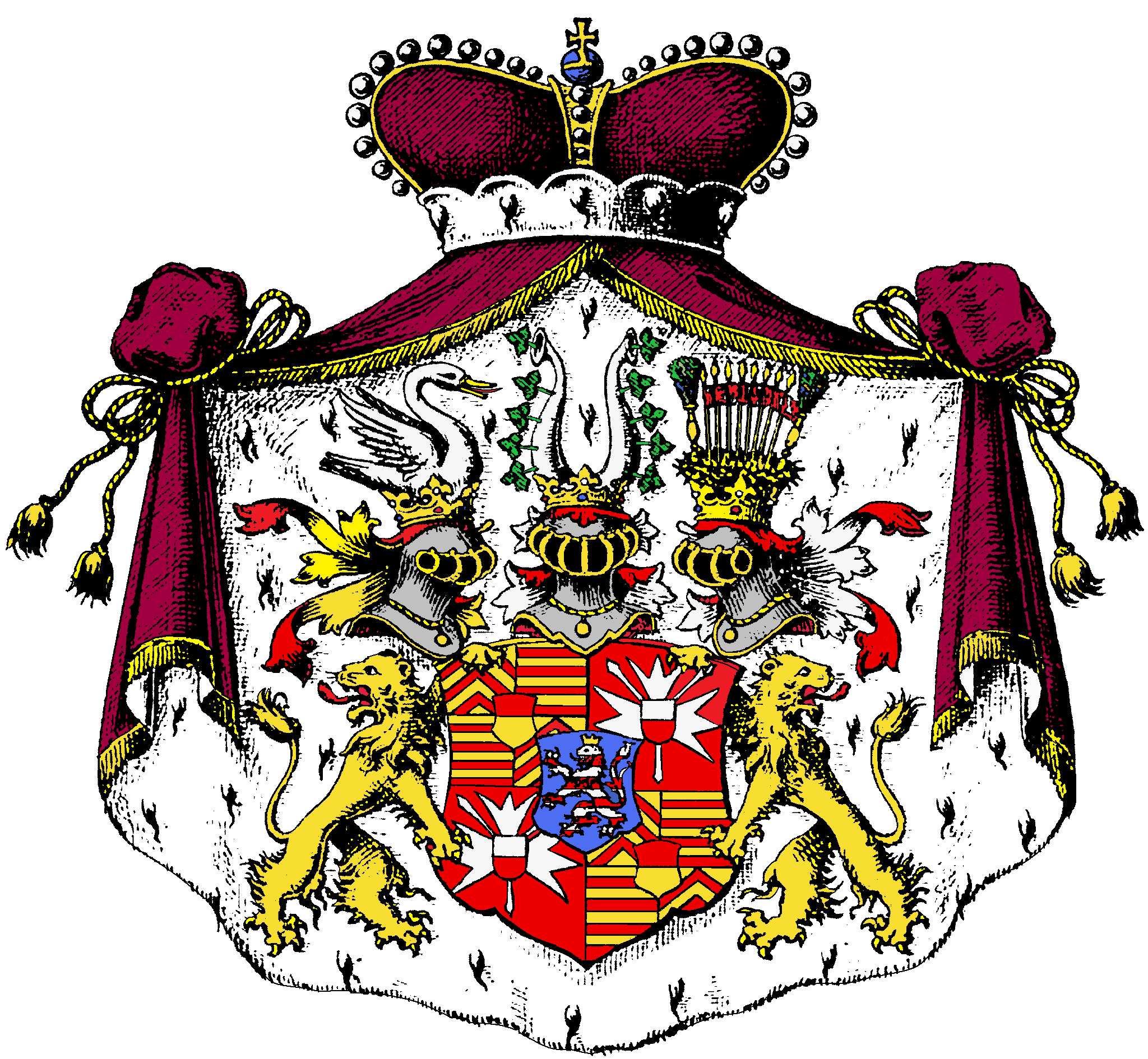
Coat of arms of the Princes of Hanau in Hořowice

The Landgraviate of Hessen-Kassel was elevated an Electorate in 1803, William IX became William I, the county of Hesse-Hanau the Principality of Hanau. When the French occupied the lands of William I in 1806 the new principality was put under military rule until 1810 and then became part of the Grand Duchy of Frankfurt. In 1813 the principality was restored to William IX. As an administrative unit it existed until 1821 when the territorial structure of the whole state of the Electorate of Hessen was reorganized. The title "Prince of Hanau" stayed within the titles of the Elector until 1866 when the Electorate of Hessen was annexed by the Kingdom of Prussia. Today's Main-Kinzig-Kreis represents about the area of the former county of Hesse-Hanau.

The last elector, Frederick William gave the title "Princess of Hanau" to his wife Gertrude Falkenstein, a commoner and divorcée he could marry only morganatically. The descendants of this marriage bear this princely title as family name Prinz(essin) von Hanau and still pass down this courtesy title, Prince and Princess of Hanau and Hořowitz, until today.

== See also ==
- County of Hanau
- Hanau-Lichtenberg
- List of rulers of Hanau
- Zweibrücken-Bitsch

== Literature ==
- Reinhard Dietrich: Die Landesverfassung in dem Hanauischen. Hanau 1996, ISBN 3-9801933-6-5. (= Hanauer Geschichtsblätter 34)
- Ernst Julius Zimmermann: Hanau Stadt und Land. 3. Auflage. Hanau 1919. (Reprint: Hanau 1978, ISBN 3-87627-243-2)
