= Katharina of Schwarzburg-Blankenburg =

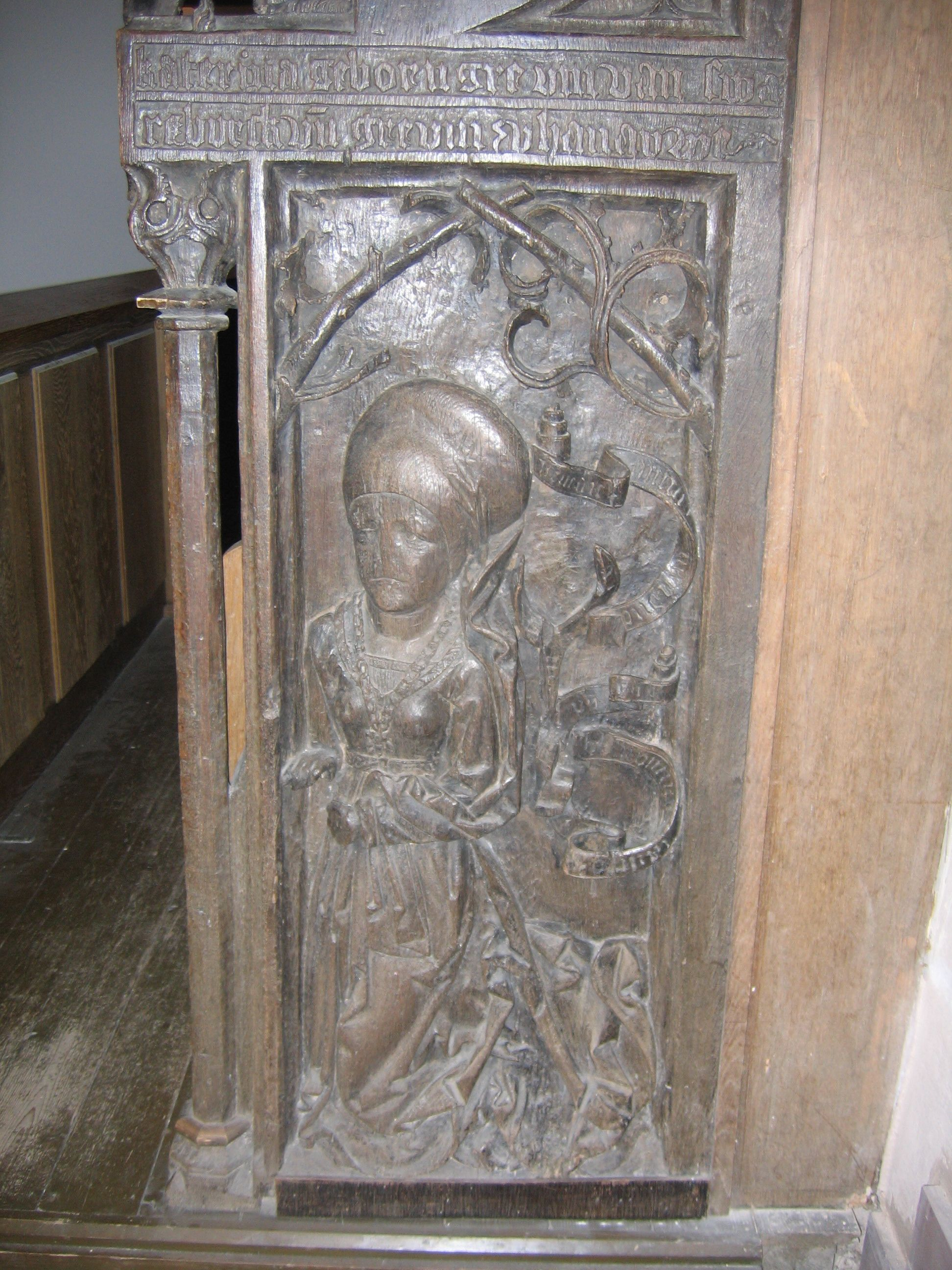
- Depiction of Katharina of Schwarzburg-Blankenburg on the side of a seat in the choir of the Church of St. Mary in Hanau
- Born: after 1470
- Died: 27 November 1514
- Buried: Church of St. Mary in Hanau
- Noble family: House of Schwarzburg
- Spouse: Reinhard IV, Count of Hanau-Münzenberg
- Father: Günther XXXVIII of Schwarzburg-Blankenburg
- Mother: Katharina of Querfurt

Katharina of Schwarzburg-Blankenburg (after 1470 – 27 November 1514) was the wife of Count Reinhard IV of Hanau-Münzenberg (14 March 1473 – 30 January 1512).

She was a daughter of Günther XXXVIII of Schwarzburg-Blankenburg (1450-1484) and Catherine of Querfurt (d. 1521).

Katharina and Reinhard married on 13 February 1496. As her dowry, she brought 4000 guilders into the marriage, plus the share held by Schwarzburg in the mortgage on the imperial city of Gelnhausen. With this share, the count acquired a power base in the Kinzig valley, which connected "Upper Hanau", around Schlüchtern and Steinau an der Straße and "Lower Hanau" around the city of Hanau.

Katharina died on 27 November 1514 and was buried in the Church of St. Mary in Hanau. A picture of her can be found on the side of a seat in the choir of the church, opposite a picture of her husband.

== Issue ==
Reinhard and Katharina had four children:

1. Anna (born: 22 May 1498; died in the same year)
2. Berthold (born: 12 July 1499; died: 27 April 1504), buried in the choir of St. Mary's Church in Hanau
3. Philipp II (1501–1529)
4. Balthasar (1508–1534)
