= Maria of Looz-Heinsberg =

Dutch noble lady (1424–1502)

Mary of Looz-Heinsberg
- Countess Consort of Nassau-Siegen
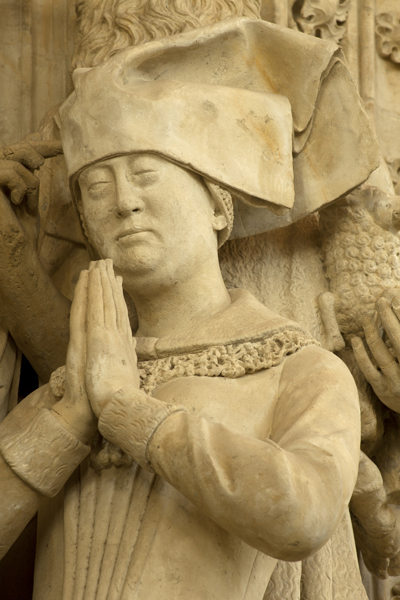
- Countess Mary of Nassau-Siegen, nee Lady of Looz-Heinsberg, detail of the epitaph in the Grote Kerk in Breda. Photo: Paul M.R. Maeyaert, 2011.

- Coat of arms
- Full name: Mary of Looz-Heinsberg
- Native name: Maria van Loon-Heinsberg
- Born: 1424
- Died: 20 April 1502
- Buried: Grote Kerk, Breda
- Noble family: House of Looz
- Spouse: John IV of Nassau-Siegen
- Issue Detail: Anne; Joanne; Ottilie; Adriana; Engelbert II; John V
- Father: John II of Loon-Heinsberg
- Mother: Anne of Solms

Lady Mary of Looz-Heinsberg (Note: In English and French the county her name originated from is called Looz, while in Dutch and German it is called Loon. In older Dutch and German sources one can also find the spelling Loen.) (1424 – 20 April 1502), Dutch: Maria van Loon-Heinsberg, was a noble lady from the House of Looz and through marriage Countess of Nassau-Siegen.

== Biography ==
Mary was born in 1424 (Note: Van Ditzhuyzen (2004), p. 151, however, states 1426 as her year of birth. That year of birth is unlikely, as it would mean that she married at the age of thirteen or fourteen, and that she gave birth to her first child at the age of fourteen or fifteen.) as the eldest daughter of Lord John II of Looz-Heinsberg and his second wife Countess Anne of Solms. Her older halfbrother John was Prince-bishop of Liège.

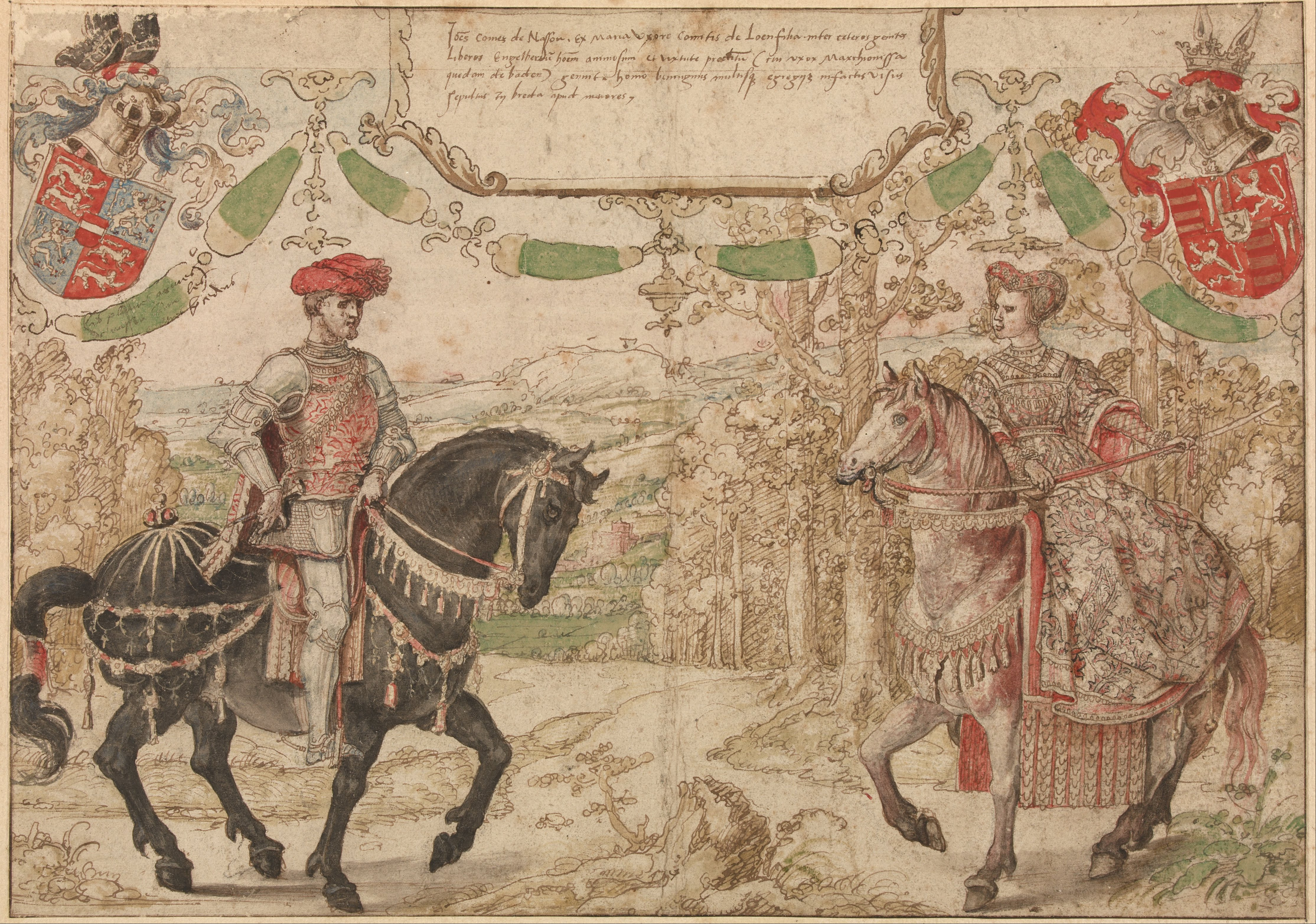
Count John IV of Nassau-Siegen and his wife Lady Mary of Looz-Heinsberg. Design drawing by Bernard van Orley for the tapestry series with the genealogy of the House of Nassau, 1528–1530. Getty Center, Los Angeles.

Mary married on 7 February 1440 (Note: The sources do not mention a place of marriage. Van Ditzhuyzen (2004), p. 151 states the date of marriage 7/17 February 1440.) to Count John IV of Nassau-Siegen (Breda Castle, (Note: Most of the sources do not mention a place of birth. Van Ditzhuyzen (2004), p. 151 states Dillenburg as place of birth, but that place of birth is very unlikely as his parents resided in the Netherlands in those days.) 1 August 1410 – Dillenburg, 3 February 1475), the eldest son of Count Engelbert I of Nassau-Siegen and Lady Joanne of Polanen. In the period between the marriage and the death of John's father in 1442, Mary and John lived in the house De Herberghe in the Reigerstraat in Breda. After that they had their main Residenz in Breda Castle, from where John managed his domains located in the Netherlands. John also succeeded his father as Count of Nassau-Siegen together with his brother Henry II. On 22 February 1447 John and his brother Henry divided their possessions, whereby John received the possessions in the Netherlands, ¼ of the County of Vianden, as well as Herborn.

Mary was known as a very devout Catholic. At the initiative of Mary and John the Sacrament of Niervaert was transferred to the Grote Kerk in Breda in 1449. This was a miraculous host whose history is told in the Middle Dutch play Spel vanden heilighen sacramente vander Nyeuwervaert and which is also depicted on the Retable of the Sacrament of Niervaert from around 1535.

After the death of his brother in 1451, John inherited his brother's possessions. His widespread possessions forced John to travel constantly, in order to govern his possessions well. When John was in his county, he governed it from Siegen or Dillenburg. When the count's family started staying in the county more often, a court was established. John had Dillenburg Castle – which until then had been used primarily as a stronghold against the unruly local nobility – extended in the period 1453–1467 and rebuilt into a residential castle for the count's family. In 1464 Mary had a church chair made in the castle chapel and a shrine for the Blessed Sacrament.

In 1469 Mary sent for rosemary and other herbs to be brought to Dillenburg from the Rhine (Cologne or Koblenz), presumably because of the plague. This is the oldest surviving report in the accounts about medicines.

Through the marriage to Mary, John obtained the heerlijkheden of Herstal, Vught, Gangelt, Waldfeucht and the Land of Millen, so that he possessed ¼ of the Duchy of Jülich. (Note: Strinkingly Jansen (1979), p. 31 states that what Mary was bringing in, was quite modest.) This led to a dispute with John's distant relative Count John II of Nassau-Saarbrücken, who was married to Lady Jeanne of Looz-Heinsberg, the daughter and heiress of Lord John IV of Looz-Heinsberg. At Mary's husband's request, Emperor Frederick III declared on 28 May 1470 that by granting the entire Duchy of Jülich to Duke Gerhard VII, the claims of Mary and her sister Philippa of Looz-Heinsberg, were not to be affected. Apparently this had no effect, because in 1471 or 1472 the Emperor ordered Duke Charles the Bold of Burgundy to settle on his behalf the dispute between Gerhard on the one hand and Mary and John on the other. The dispute became more complicated when in 1472 Gerhard VII's son William married to Countess Elisabeth of Nassau-Saarbrücken, John II's eldest daughter, who had inherited her mother's possessions. In 1474, the Emperor withdrew the order to Charles the Bold and instead transferred the matter to Archbishop John II of Trier. The dispute was only settled when on 25 August 1499 Mary's eldest son Engelbert II transferred his half of the castle and the land of Millen with the towns of Gangelt and Vught to Duke William of Jülich and Berg and received in exchange from the latter on 27 August 1499 the city and the land of Diest and the castle and the land of Zichem and Zeelhem.

As a widow Mary founded Vredenburg Abbey in Bavel in 1476, and the convent of the Grey Sisters in 1478. She also devoted herself to the nunnery Saint Catherinadal Abbey in Breda. And in 1486 she generously endowed Saint Wendelin's chapel in Breda.

Mary stipulated in her will and testament, drawn up in 1501, that the Rentmeister should distribute 100 malters of grain from her estate for the poor of Dillenburg. She died in Siegen on 20 April 1502 and was buried in the Grote Kerk in Breda. (Note: Lück (1981), p. 25 states that Mary was buried in the St. John's Church of the Franciscan monastery in Siegen, which was founded by her son John V. Since Mary is not mentioned in the records of the members of the House of Nassau buried in St. Mary's Church in Siegen – where they were reburied in 1836 from the aforementioned monastery church –, the author probably made a mistake.)

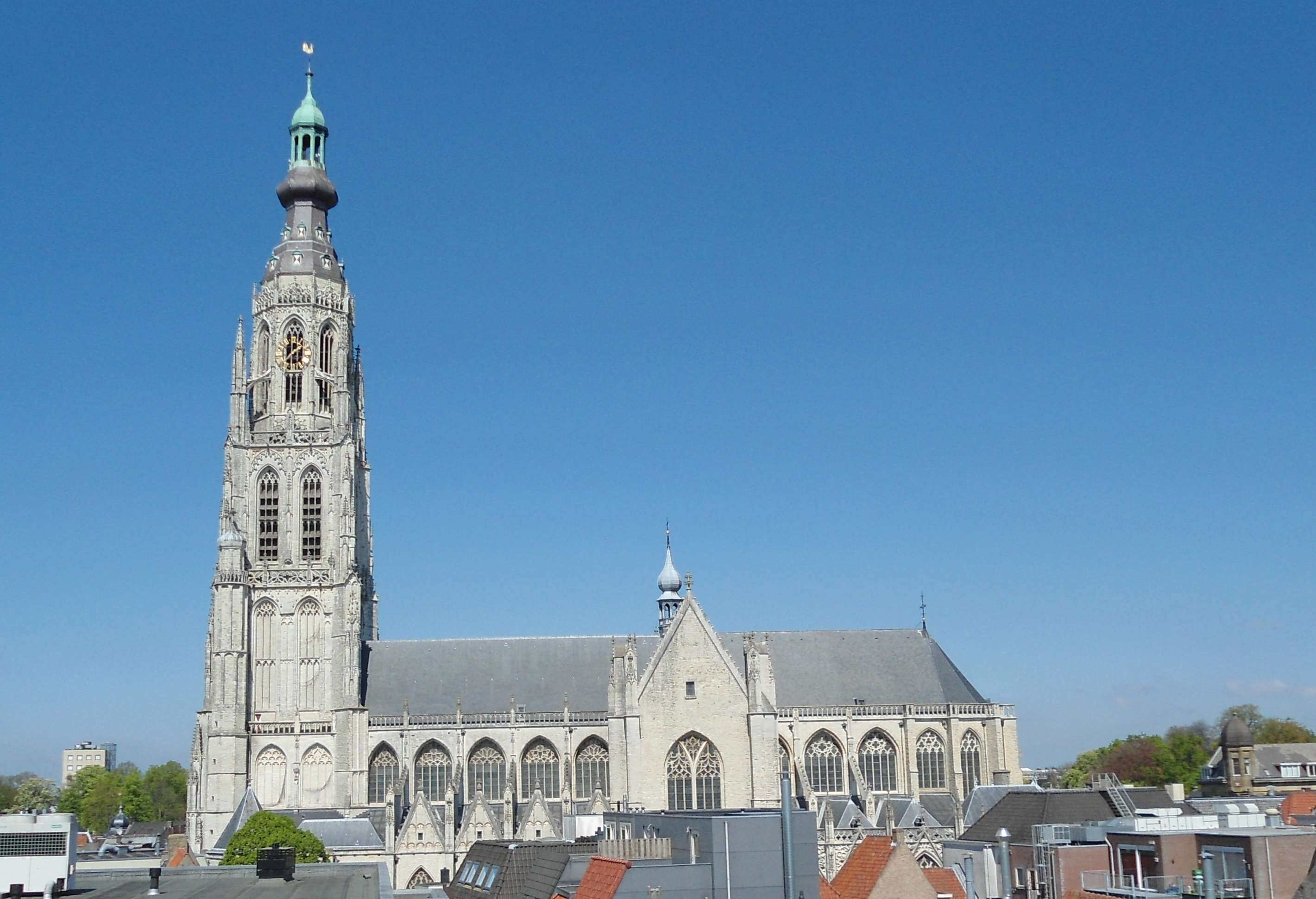
The Grote Kerk in Breda, 2012.

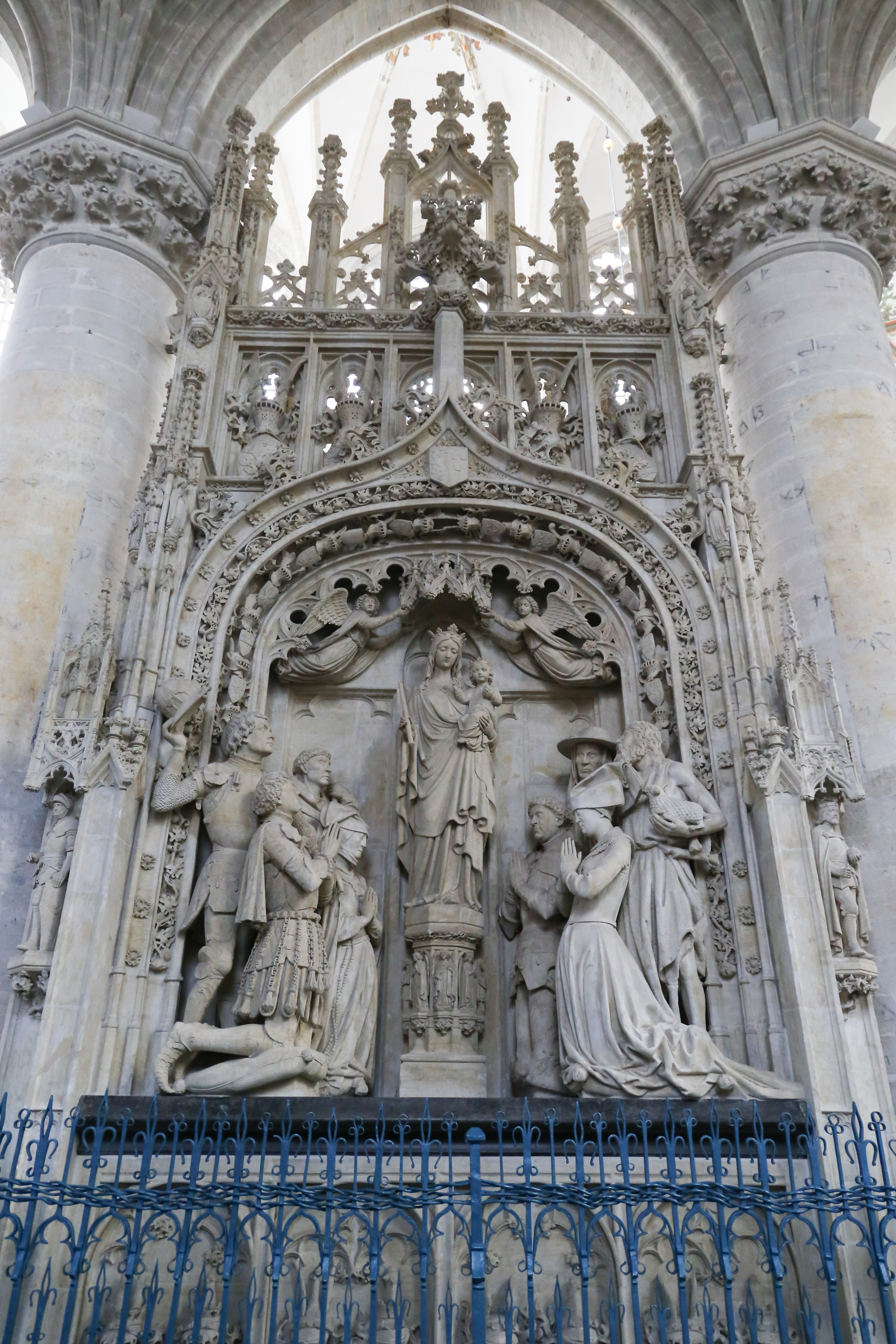
The epitaph for Engelbert I of Nassau-Siegen, Joanne of Polanen, John IV of Nassau-Siegen and Mary of Looz-Heinsberg, in the Grote Kerk in Breda. Photo: Richard Broekhuijzen, 2017.

== Issue ==
From the marriage of Mary and John the following children were born: (Note: The second daughter from this marriage, Joanne, is not mentioned by Vorsterman van Oyen (1882) and Textor von Haiger, Johann (1617). Nassauische Chronik. In welcher des vralt, hochlöblich, vnd weitberühmten Stamms vom Hause Naßaw, Printzen vnd Graven Genealogi oder Stammbaum: deren geburt, leben, heurath, kinder, zu Friden- vnd Kriegszeiten verzichtete sachen und thaten, absterben, und sonst denckwürdige Geschichten. Sampt einer kurtzen general Nassoviae und special Beschreibung der Graf- und Herschaften Naßaw-Catzenelnbogen, etc (in German). Herborn: Christoph Raab.)

1. Anne (1440 or 1441 (Note: Katzenelnbogen, Anna Gräfin von states that she was born in Dillenburg. That is very unlikely as her parents resided in Breda at that time according to Van Ditzhuyzen (2004), p. 152.) – Celle, 5 or 8 April 1514 (Note: The date of death 8 April 1514 in Dek (1970), p. 69, and 5 April 1514 in Vorsterman van Oyen (1882), p. 94, and Katzenelnbogen, Anna Gräfin von.)), married:
  1. on 28 October 1467 to Duke Otto II the Victorious of Brunswick-Lüneburg (1439 – January 1471 (Note: The date of death 8 or 19 January 1471 in Schutte (1979), p. 41, 8 January 1471 in Dek (1970), p. 69, 19 January 1471 in Vorsterman van Oyen (1882), p. 94, and 17 January 1471 in Spehr, Ferdinand (1880). "Heinrich der Mittlere, Herzog von Braunschweig-Lüneburg". Allgemeine Deutsche Biographie (in German). Vol. Band 11. Leipzig: Duncker & Humblot. p. 492.));
  2. on 24 January 1474 to Count Philip the Elder of Katzenelnbogen (1402 – 28 July 1479 (Note: The date of death 27 or 28 July 1479 in Schutte (1979), p. 41, and 27 June 1479 in Vorsterman van Oyen (1882), p. 94.)).
2. Joanne (1444 – May 1468), married on 14 October 1464 to Count Philip I of Waldeck-Waldeck (1445 – 1475).
3. Ottilie (c. 1445 (Note: Schutte (1979), p. 42, Dek (1970), p. 70, and Vorsterman van Oyen (1882), p. 95 mention Ottilie as the youngest daughter, without mentioning a date of birth, born after her brother John, who was born in 1455. Ottilie being born after 1455 seems to be unlikely as she was already mentioned as a nun to reform a convent in 1463. The year of birth c. 1445 in Ruizendaal, Willem & Conrads, Marian (1995). Nassau & Oranje. 600 jaar geschiedenis van ons vorstenhuis. Van Engelbert I tot Willem-Alexander (in Dutch). Baarn: BV Uitgeversmaatschappij Tirion. p. 37. ISBN 90-5121-548-7.) – Alkmaar, 22 April 1495). Was a nun in the Bethany Abbey near Mechelen until 1463 and then in the Saint Catherinadal Abbey in Breda 1463–1476. She was the first prioress of Vredenburg Abbey in Bavel 1476–1495.
4. Adriana (Breda, 7 February 1449 – 15 January 1477 (Note: The date of death 11 or 15 June 1477 in Schutte (1979), p. 42, and 11 June 1477 in Vorsterman van Oyen (1882), p. 94.)), married on 12 September 1468 to Count Philip I of Hanau-Münzenberg (21 September 1449 – 26 August 1500).
5. Count Engelbert II the Illustrious (Breda, 17 May 1451 – Brussels, 31 May 1504), succeeded his father in the possessions in the Netherlands. Married in Koblenz on 19 December 1468 to Margravine Cimburga of Baden (15 May 1450 – Breda, 5 July 1501).
6. Count John V (Breda, 9 November 1455 – Dillenburg or Siegen, (Note: Schutte (1979), p. 42 and Dek (1970), p. 70 state Dillenburg as place of death, and Vorsterman van Oyen (1882), p. 95 states Dillenburg Castle. Assman & Menk (1996), however, state Siegen Castle as place of death and Joachim (1881), p. 253 states Siegen.) 30 July 1516), succeeded his father in Nassau-Siegen and Diez. Married in Marburg on 11 February 1482 to Landgravine Elisabeth of Hesse-Marburg (Marburg, May 1466 – Cologne, 17 January 1523 (Note: Schutte (1979), p. 42 states the date 7 or 17 January 1523.)).
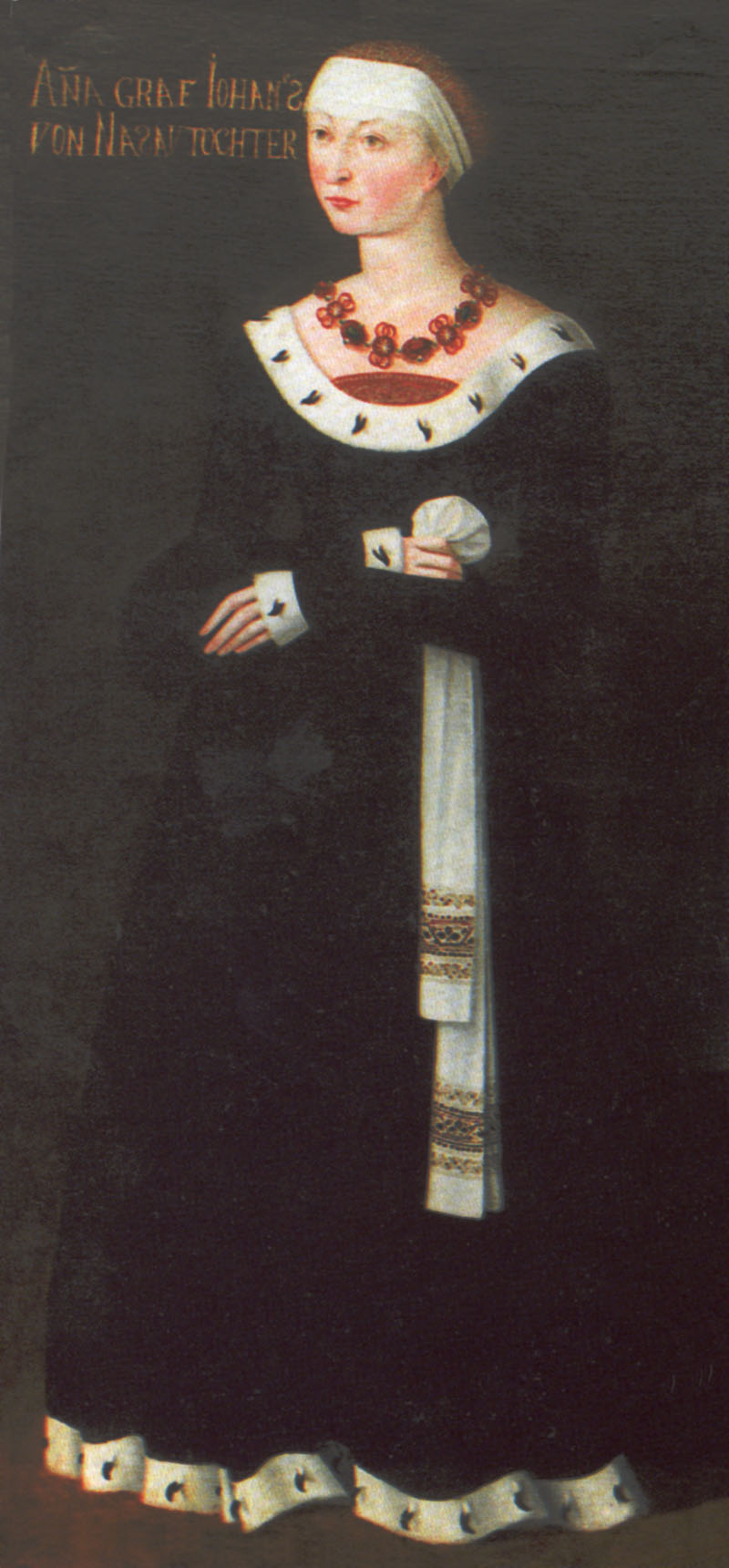
Anne of Nassau-Siegen (1440/41–1514). Anonymous portrait, c. 1460.

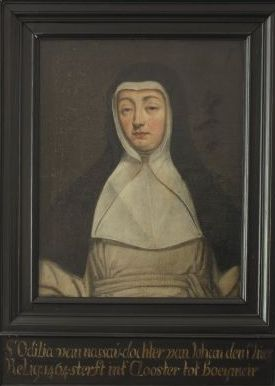
Ottilie of Nassau-Siegen (c. 1445–1495). Portrait by master Sommeren, 1681. Saint Catharinadal Abbey, Oosterhout.

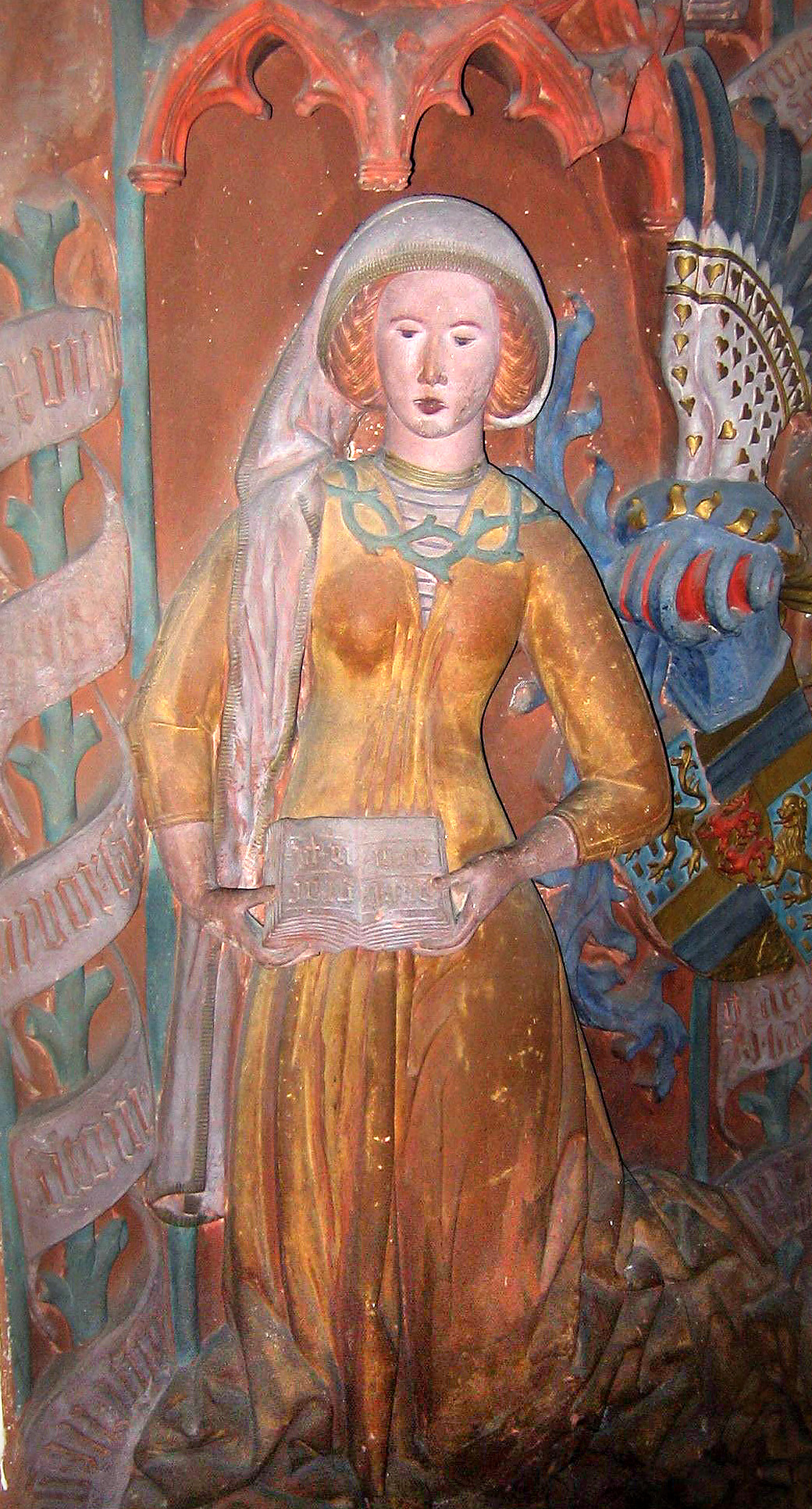
Epitaph of Adriana of Nassau-Siegen (1449–1477). Marienkirche, Hanau. Photo: Reinhard Dietrich, 2009.

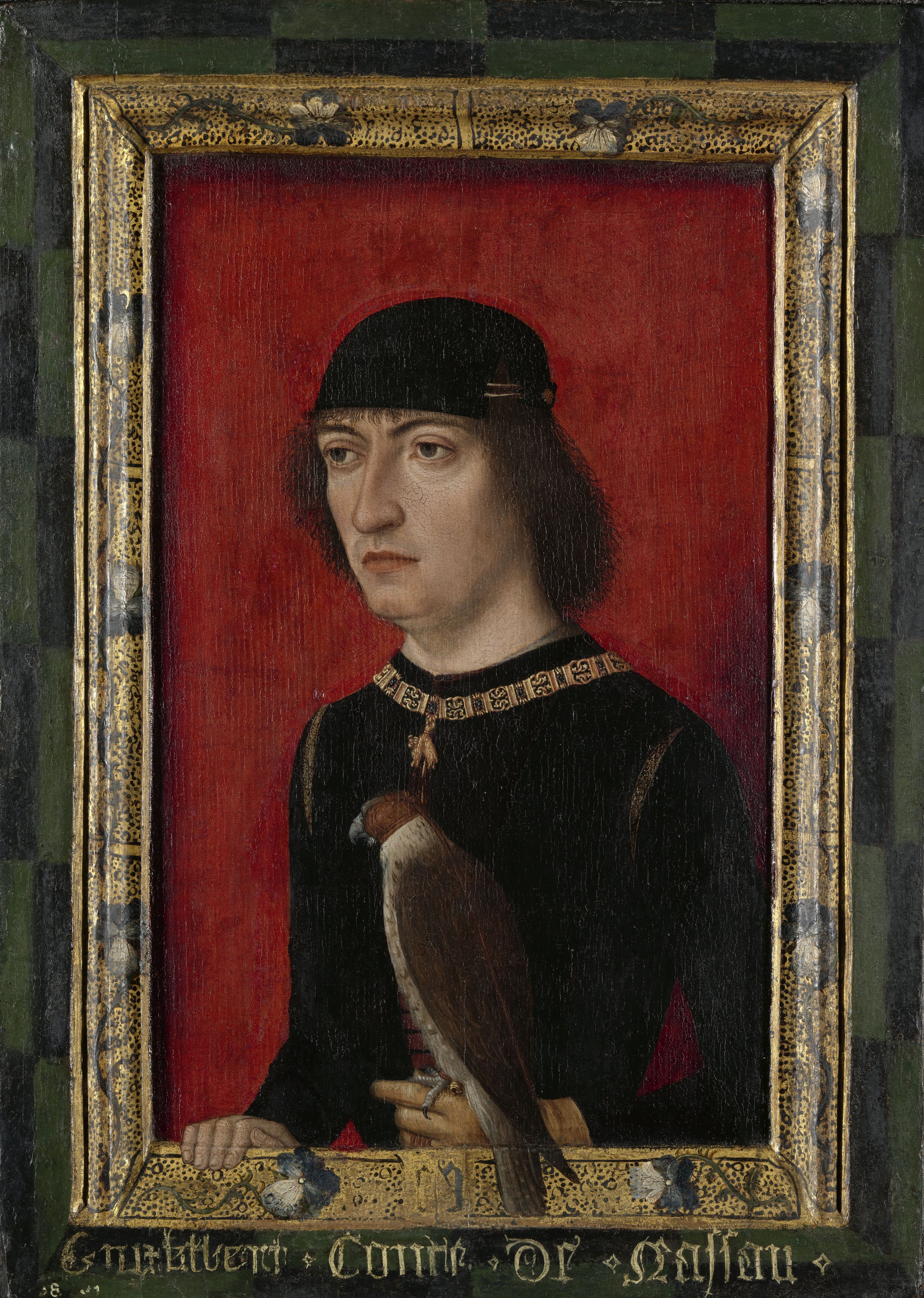
Count Engelbert II the Illustrious of Nassau-Breda (1451–1504). Portrait by the Master of Portraits of Princes, 1487. Rijksmuseum, Amsterdam.

== Ancestors ==
Ancestors of Mary of Looz-Heinsberg
Great-great-grandparents	Godfrey I of Heinsberg (d. 1331) ⚭ before 1299; Mathilde of Looz (d. 1313)	Henry of Voorne (d. after 1327) ⚭ ? (?–?)	Gerhard V of Jülich (d. 1328) ⚭ 1299; Elisabeth of Brabant-Aarschot (c. 1280–1350/55)	William I of Hainaut (c. 1286–1328) ⚭ 1305; Joan of Valois (c. 1284–1342)	Henry IV of Solms (d. 1311/12) ⚭ before 1295; Elisabeth of Lippe (d. after 1325)	? (?–?) ⚭ ? (?–?)	Kuno II of Falkenstein (c. 1290–1334) ⚭ before 1312; Anne of Nassau-Hadamar (d. before 1329)	Philip V of Falkenstein (d. 1343) ⚭ Elisabeth (?–?)
Great-grandparents	John I of Heinsberg (d. 1334) ⚭ c. 1324; Catherine of Voorne (d. 1366)		William I of Jülich (d. 1362) ⚭ 1324; Joanna of Hainaut (1311/13–1374)		Bernhard of Solms (d. 1347/49) ⚭ ? (?–?)		Philip VI of Falkenstein (d. 1372/73) ⚭ before 1363; Agnes of Falkenstein (d. 1380)	
Grandparents	Godfrey II of Heinsberg (d. 1395) ⚭ 1357; Philippa of Jülich (d. 1390)				Otto I of Solms (d. 1410) ⚭ Agnes of Falkenstein (c. 1358–1409)			
Parents	John II of Looz-Heinsberg (d. 1438) ⚭ 1423; Anne of Solms (d. 1433)							

== Literature ==
- Kremer, Christoph Jacob (1786). Geschichte der Herrn von Heinsberg des jüngern Geschlechts im Herzogthum Gülch. Nebst einigen diplomatischen Nachrichten vom Geschlechte der alten Herrn von Diest (in German). Giessen: Krieger dem jüngern.

== Sources ==
- Van der Aa, A.J. (1860). "Jan IV, graaf van Nassau, Vianden, Dietz enz.". Biographisch Woordenboek der Nederlanden, bevattende levensbeschrijvingen van zoodanige personen, die zich op eenigerlei wijze in ons vaderland hebben vermaard gemaakt (in Dutch). Vol. Negende deel. Haarlem: J.J. van Brederode. pp. 87–88.
- Becker, E. (1983) [1950]. Schloss und Stadt Dillenburg. Ein Gang durch ihre Geschichte in Mittelalter und Neuzeit. Zur Gedenkfeier aus Anlaß der Verleihung der Stadtrechte am 20. September 1344 herausgegeben (in German) (Neuauflage ed.). Dillenburg: Der Magistrat der Stadt Dillenburg.
- Blok, P.J. (1911). "Johan (Johann) IV, graaf van Nassau-Dillenburg". In Molhuysen, P.C. & Blok, P.J. (eds.). Nieuw Nederlandsch Biografisch Woordenboek (in Dutch). Vol. Eerste deel. Leiden: A.W. Sijthoff. pp. 1218–1219.
- Dek, A.W.E. (1970). Genealogie van het Vorstenhuis Nassau (in Dutch). Zaltbommel: Europese Bibliotheek.
- Van Ditzhuyzen, Reinildis (2004) [1992]. Oranje-Nassau. Een biografisch woordenboek (in Dutch) (3rd ed.). Haarlem: Becht. ISBN 90-230-1124-4.
- Huberty, Michel; Giraud, Alain & Magdelaine, F. & B. (1981). l'Allemagne Dynastique (in French). Vol. Tome III: Brunswick-Nassau-Schwarzbourg. Le Perreux: Alain Giraud. ISBN 2-901138-03-9.
- Jansen, H.P.H. (1979). "De Bredase Nassaus". In Tamse, C.A. (ed.). Nassau en Oranje in de Nederlandse geschiedenis (in Dutch). Alphen aan den Rijn: A.W. Sijthoff. pp. 11–40. ISBN 90-218-2447-7.
- Lück, Alfred (1981) [1967]. Siegerland und Nederland (in German) (2nd ed.). Siegen: Siegerländer Heimatverein e.V.
- Van Raak, Cees (1995). Heden vredig ontslapen. Funeraire geschiedenis van het huis Oranje-Nassau (in Dutch). Bussum: Uitgeverij Thoth. ISBN 90-6868-117-6.
- Schutte, O. (1979). "Genealogische gegevens". In Tamse, C.A. (ed.). Nassau en Oranje in de Nederlandse geschiedenis (in Dutch). Alphen aan den Rijn: A.W. Sijthoff. pp. 40–44. ISBN 90-218-2447-7.
- Toebosch, Theo (1996). "Gebalsemde Oranjes". NRC Handelsblad (in Dutch).
- Van der Eycken, Michel (1980). "Diest en het Huis Oranje-Nassau". Diest en het Huis Oranje-Nassau. Diestsche Cronycke (in Dutch). Vol. 3. Diest: Stedelijk Museum. pp. 15–42.
- Vorsterman van Oyen, A.A. (1882). Het vorstenhuis Oranje-Nassau. Van de vroegste tijden tot heden (in Dutch). Leiden & Utrecht: A.W. Sijthoff & J.L. Beijers.
- De Vries Feyens, G.L. (1933). "De voorouders van den Prins van Oranje op Nederlandschen bodem". In De Savornin Lohman, Jhr. B.C.; De Vries Feyens, G.L.; Beelaerts van Blokland, Jhr. W.A.; Goosens, Th.J.A.J.; Van Schelven, A.A. & Theissen, J.S. (eds.). Prins Willem van Oranje 1533-1933 (in Dutch). Haarlem: H.D. Tjeenk Willink & Zoon N.V. pp. 11–24.
- Wenzelburger, Karl Theodor (1881). "Johann IV., Graf von Nassau-Dillenburg, Vianden, Diez etc.". Allgemeine Deutsche Biographie (in German). Vol. Band 14. Leipzig: Duncker & Humblot. pp. 251–252.

Maria of Looz-Heinsberg House of Looz Born: 1424 Died: 20 April 1502
Regnal titles
Preceded by Joanne of Polanen	Countess Consort of Nassau-Siegen; 3 May 1442 – 3 February 1475	Vacant Title next held by Elisabeth of Hesse-Marburg
