= Henneberg =

Henneberg may refer to:

== Places ==
- County of Henneberg, a mediaeval state in the Holy Roman Empire
- Henneberg, Thuringia, a municipality in Thuringia, Germany

== People ==
- Henneberg family, a German noble family
  - Catherine of Henneberg (c. 1334–1397)
  - Berthold von Henneberg (1442–1504), Archbishop of Mainz
  - William IV, Princely count of Henneberg-Schleusingen (c. 1475–1559)
- Claus H. Henneberg (1936-1998), German librettist and translator
- Georg Henneberg (1908-1996), German physician, director of Robert Koch Institute
- Gerd Michael Henneberg (1922-2011), German actor and theater director
- Hugo Henneberg (1863-1918), Austrian amateur photographer
- Jill Henneberg (1974-), US Olympic equestrian
- Johann Baptist Henneberg (1768-1822), Austrian composer, pianist, organist and Kapellmeister
- Maciej Henneberg (born 1949), Australian-Polish physical anthropologist and evolutionist
- Mary Jane (Molly) Henneberg (born 1973), TV reporter
- Nathalie Henneberg (1910-1977), French science fiction writer
- Richard Henneberg (1853-1925), German composer
- Wilhelm Henneberg (1825-1890), German chemist, disciple of Liebig.
- Zdzisław Henneberg (1911-1941), Polish pilot, Squadron Leader in the Battle of Britain

== See also ==
- Henneberger (disambiguation)
- Hennenberg
- Hennenberger
