= Wilhelm II of Henneberg-Schleusingen =

William II of Henneberg-Schleusingen
- Born: 14 March 1415
- Died: 8 January 1444 (aged 28)
- Noble family: House of Henneberg
- Spouse: Catherine of Hanau
- Father: William I, Princely count of Henneberg-Schleusingen
- Mother: Anna of Brunswick

William II of Henneberg-Schleusingen (born: 14 March 1415; died: 8 January 1444, killed in a hunting accident) was the second husband of Catherine of Hanau (born: 25 January 1408; died: 25 September 1460). She was the oldest daughter of Reinhard II, Count of Hanau and his wife Catherine of Nassau-Beilstein and had earlier been married to Count Thomas II of Rieneck. William II and Catherine were engaged on 17 May 1432. She signed away her legal claims against the County of Rieneck in June 1432, in exchange for 8000florins. From William, she received a dowry of 16000florins, which were secured by the district and castle of Mainberg, near Schweinfurt.

Princely count William II died after a hunting accident, which happened on the evening of New Year's Day 1444: a wild boar, which he tried to kill with his sword, wounded him so severely that he died a few days later.

William and Catherine had the following children:

- William III, Princely count of Henneberg-Schleusingen (born: 12 March 1434; died: 26 May 1480), married to Duchess Margaret of Brunswick-Wolfenbüttel (born: 1451, died: 13 February 1509)
- Margaret (1437-1491), a nun in the convent at Ilm
- John III (born: 2 July 1439; died: 20 May 1513), abbot of the monastery of Fulda
- Berthold XII (born: 9 January 1441), clergyman
- Berthold XIV (born: 4 March 1443; died: 20 April 1495), provost of Bamberg
- Margaret (born: 10 October 1444; died: 3 March 1485), married to Count Günther XXXVI of Schwarzburg-Blankenburg (d. 1503)
