= Henneberger =

Henneberger can refer to:

- Barbara Henneberger (October 4, 1940 – April 12, 1964), German alpine skier
- Kathrin Henneberger (born 1987), German politician
- Moriz Henneberger (16 October 1878, Basel – 7 April 1959, Basel), Swiss chess master
- Walter Henneberger (19 May 1883, Ennenda – 15 January 1969, Zurich), Swiss chess master

See also: Hennenberger, Hennenberg, Henneberg (disambiguation)
