= Kloster Veßra =

- Municipality
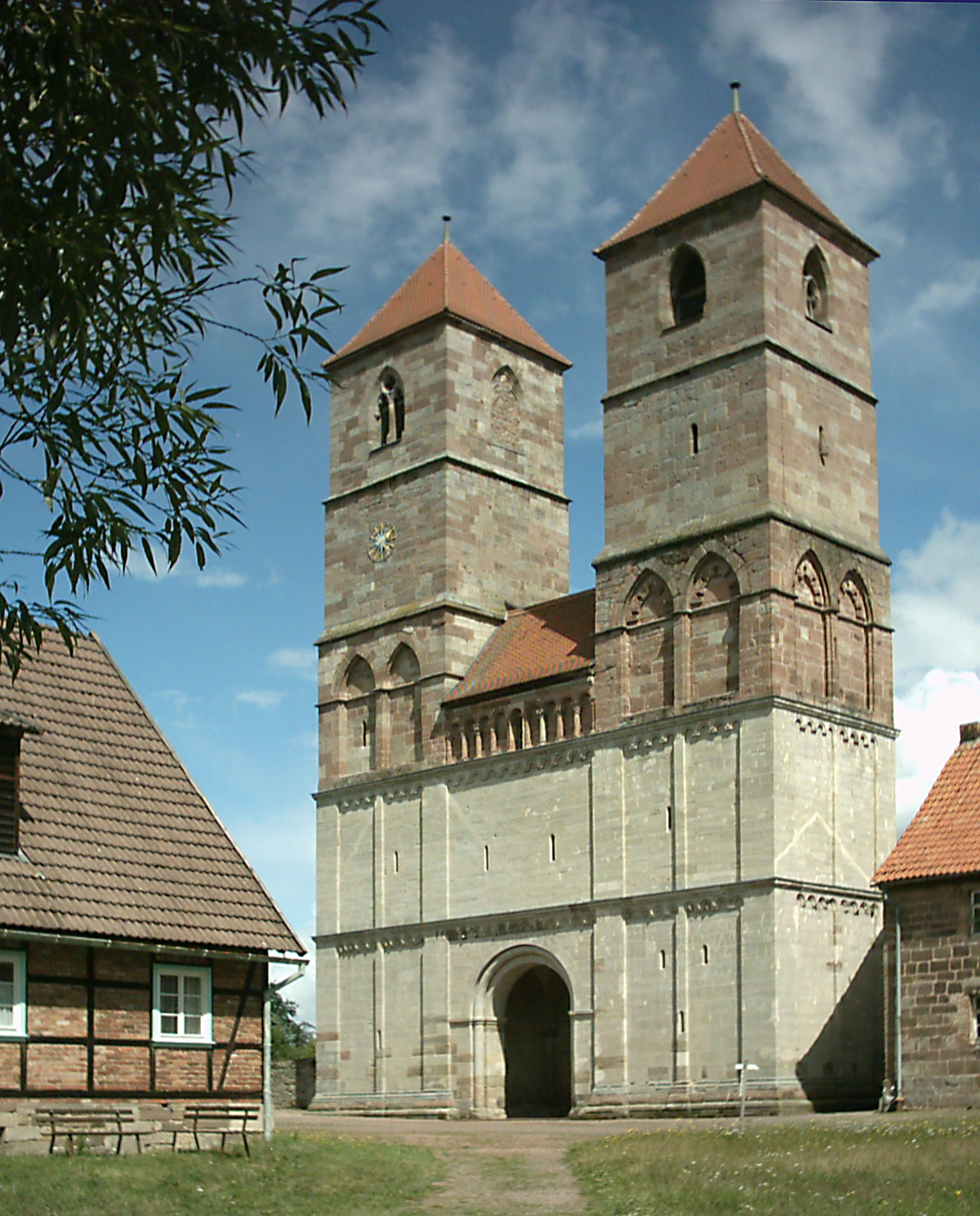

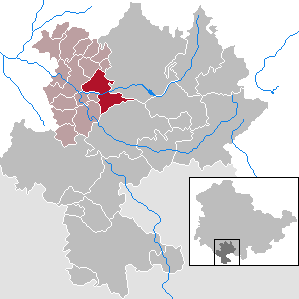
- Location of Kloster Veßra within Hildburghausen district
- Interactive map of Kloster Veßra
- Location within Germany Location within Thuringia
- Coordinates: 50°30′N 10°39′E
- Country: Germany
- State: Thuringia
- District: Hildburghausen
- Municipal assoc.: Feldstein

Government
  - Mayor (2022–28): Wolfgang Möller

Area
  - Total: 19.75 km^{2} (7.63 sq mi)
- Elevation: 340 m (1,120 ft)

Population (2025-12-31)
  - Total: 255
  - Density: 12.9/km^{2} (33.4/sq mi)
- Time zone: UTC+01:00 (CET)
  - Summer (DST): UTC+02:00 (CEST)
- Postal codes: 98660
- Dialling codes: 036873
- Vehicle registration: HBN

Kloster Veßra is a municipality in the district of Hildburghausen in Thuringia, Germany.

Vessra Abbey (now an open-air museum) was founded and supported by the Henneberg family and abandoned after the Reformation. The church was used as a parish church until 1939 when it caught fire. It also had a close association with the von Bibra family in the 15th century.

== Literature and Film ==
- Kloster Veßra - Begegnung mit der Vergangenheit, Documentary (2012), Directed by Robert Sauerbrey
