= Josefov (Sokolov District) =

- Municipality
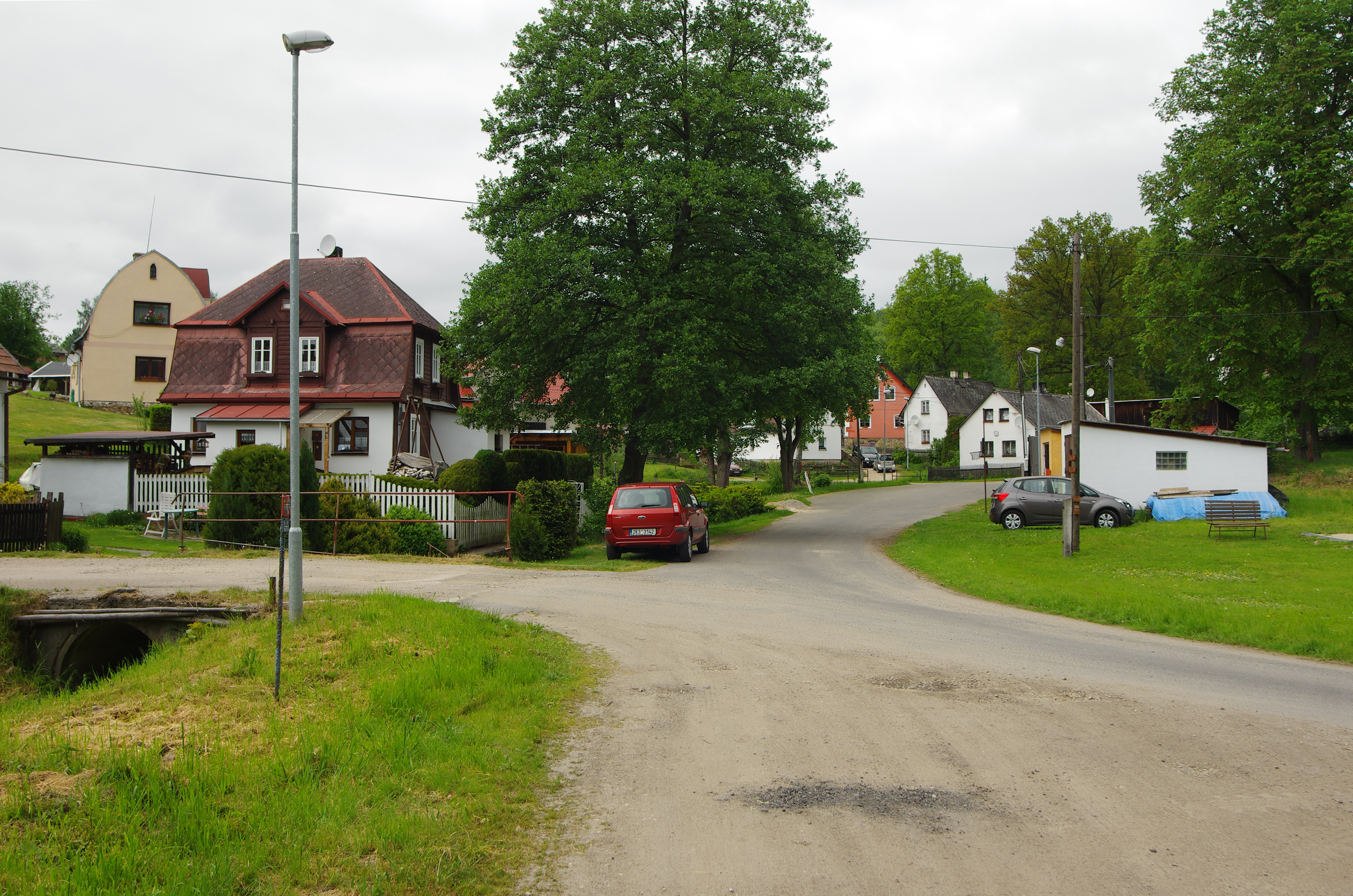
- Radvanov, a part of Josefov

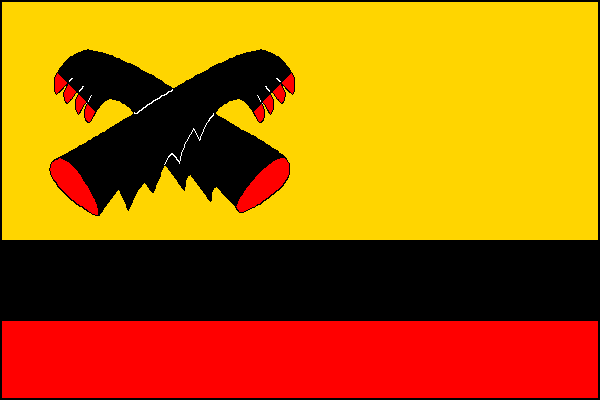
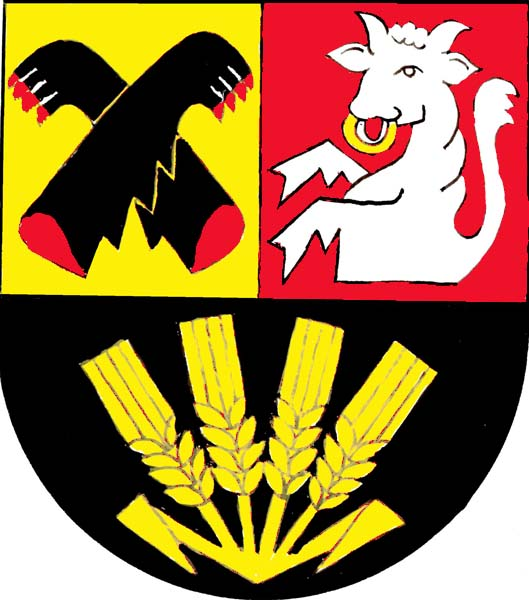
- Flag Coat of arms

- Location in the Czech Republic
- Coordinates: 50°12′42″N 12°34′46″E
- Country: Czech Republic
- Region: Karlovy Vary
- District: Sokolov
- Founded: 1833

Area
  - Total: 8.33 km^{2} (3.22 sq mi)
- Elevation: 525 m (1,722 ft)

Population (2026-01-01)
  - Total: 442
  - Density: 53.1/km^{2} (137/sq mi)
- Time zone: UTC+1 (CET)
  - Summer (DST): UTC+2 (CEST)
- Postal code: 357 09
- Website: www.obecjosefov.cz

Josefov (German: Josefsdorf) is a municipality and village in Sokolov District in the Karlovy Vary Region of the Czech Republic. It has about 400 inhabitants.

== Administrative division ==
Josefov consists of four municipal parts (in brackets population according to the 2021 census):

- Josefov (242)
- Hřebeny (57)
- Luh nad Svatavou (56)
- Radvanov (26)

== Etymology ==
The village was named in honour of its founder, Count Josef of Auersperg.

== Geography ==
Josefov is located about 6 kilometres (4 mi) northwest of Sokolov and 19 km (12 mi) west of Karlovy Vary. It lies in the southwestern part of the Ore Mountains. The highest point is at 578 m (1,896 ft) above sea level. The municipality is situated on the right bank of the Svatava River, which forms the eastern municipal border.

== History ==
History of the area is connected with the Hartenberg Castle, which was probably built in 1196. The village of Josefov was founded in 1833 by Count Josef of Auersperg.

== Demographics ==
Historical population

Year	Pop.	±%
1869	732	—
1880	845	+15.4%
1890	822	−2.7%
1900	991	+20.6%
1910	971	−2.0%

Year	Pop.	±%
1921	932	−4.0%
1930	1,012	+8.6%
1950	523	−48.3%
1961	531	+1.5%
1970	399	−24.9%

Year	Pop.	±%
1980	298	−25.3%
1991	277	−7.0%
2001	305	+10.1%
2011	342	+12.1%
2021	381	+11.4%

Source: Censuses

== Transport ==
Josefov is located on the railway line Sokolov–Kraslice. There are two stations serving the municipality: Hřebeny and Luh nad Svatavou.

== Sights ==
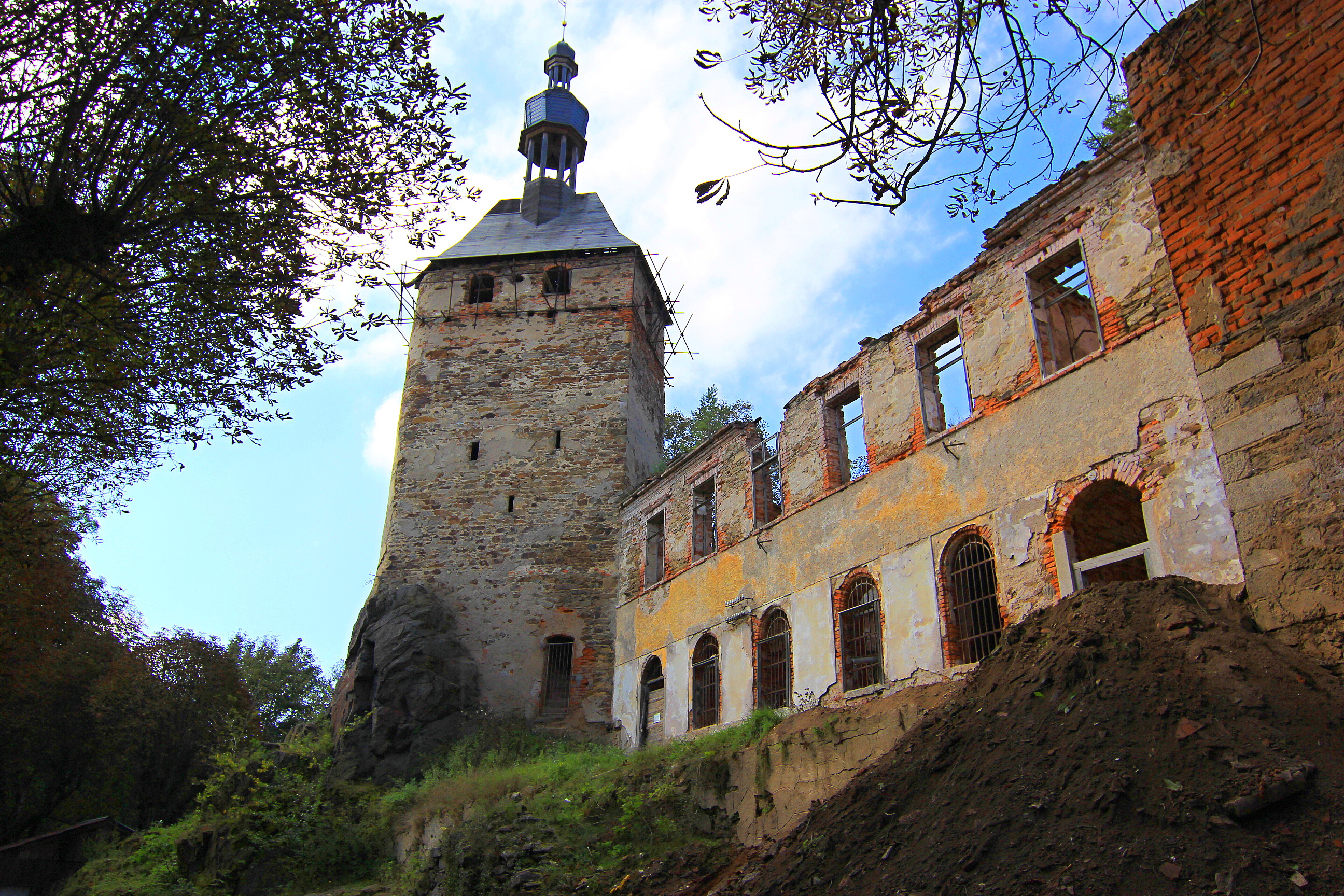
Ruins of the Hartenberg Castle

The most important monument of the municipality is the ruins of the Hartenberg Castle. It is open to the public.
