= Wilhelm IV of Henneberg-Schleusingen =

William IV, Princely count of Henneberg-Schleusingen
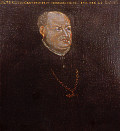
- Born: 29 January 1478
- Died: 24 January 1559 (aged 80); Salorno
- Noble family: House of Henneberg
- Father: William III, Princely count of Henneberg-Schleusingen (1434–1480)
- Mother: Margaret (1451–1509), daughter of Henry the Peaceful, Duke of Brunswick-Lüneburg

Princely count William IV of Henneberg-Schleusingen (29 January 1478 – 24 January 1559), a member of the House of Henneberg, was a ruler of the Principality of Henneberg, within the Holy Roman Empire.

The son of William III of Henneberg, William inherited the Principality of Henneberg on 26 May 1480, when his father died, and reigned until his own death nearly eighty years later, on 24 January 1559.

William married Anastasia of Brandenburg, a daughter of Albrecht III Achilles, Elector of Brandenburg.

In 1543–1544, William embraced the Protestant Reformation. In 1554, he signed a treaty of inheritance with John Frederick II, Duke of Saxony. William died in Salorno five years later. However, when his successor George Ernest, the last Prince of Henneberg, died, both the Ernestine and the Albertine branches of the Wettin dynasty claimed his estates. In 1660, they were finally divided between the Ernestine duchies of Saxe-Weimar and Saxe-Gotha and the Albertine Maurice of Saxe-Zeitz, while the lordship of Schmalkalden went to William IV, Landgrave of Hesse-Kassel, honouring an inheritance treaty of 1360.
