= Vessra Abbey =

Premonstratensian monastery

Coordinates: 50.5°N 10.65°E

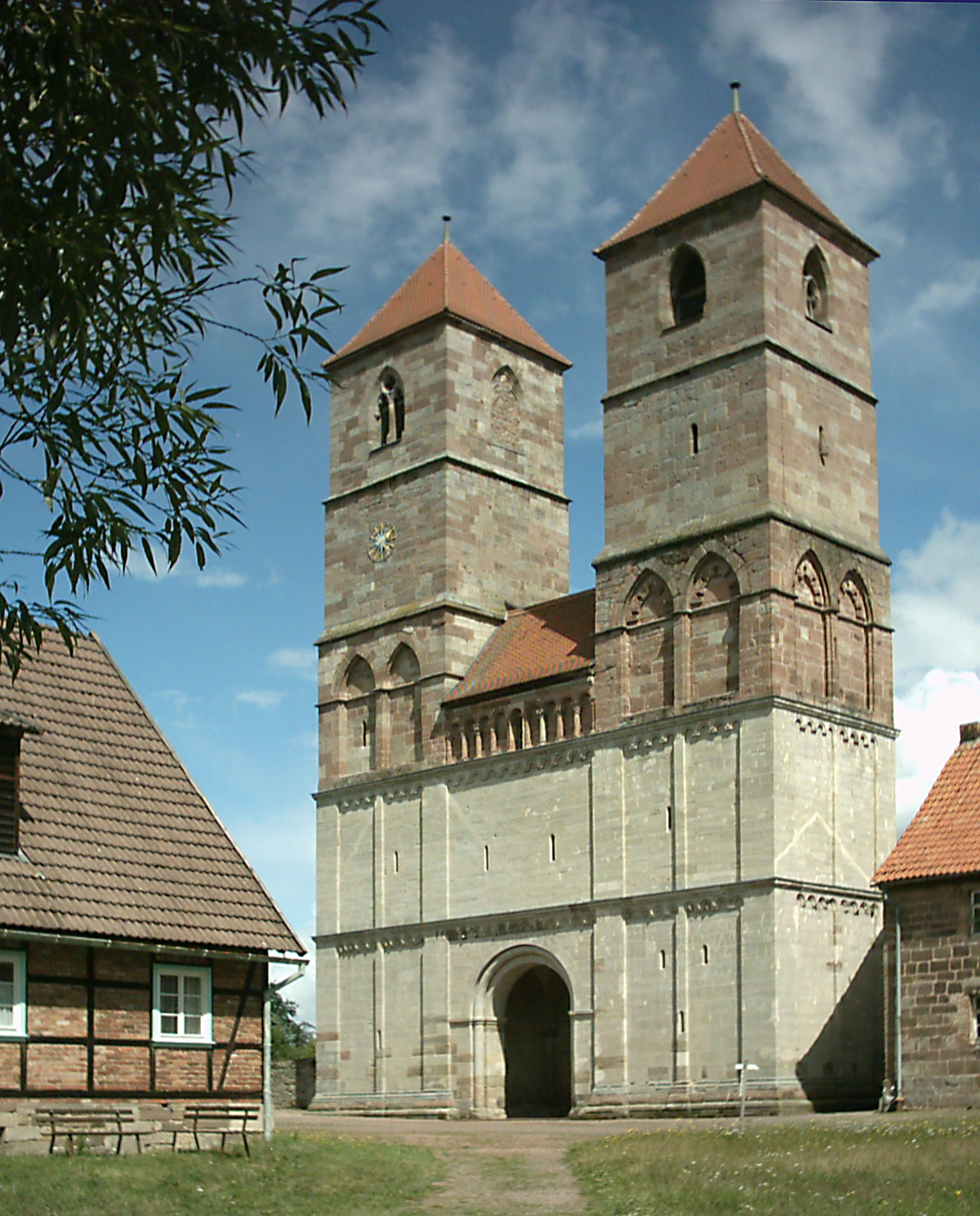
Former church of Vessra Abbey

Vessra Abbey (German: Kloster Veßra) was a Premonstratensian monastery in the village also named Kloster Veßra in the district of Hildburghausen, Thuringia, Germany.

The monastery was founded in the 1130s by Gotebold II, Count of Henneberg, and his wife Liutgard on a site near the confluence of the Schleuse and the Werra. The church was dedicated in 1138; the foundation received papal confirmation three years later.

For the whole of its existence of more than four hundred years the abbey was the house monastery of the Hennebergs. It also had a close association with the von Bibra family, particularly in the 15th century. During the Reformation in 1543, the monastery was turned into an estate.

The former monastery served another four hundred years as an agricultural estate, mostly in private hands, but after World War II as a possession of the East German state, and from 1953 as the site of a collective farm (Landwirtschaftliche Produktionsgenossenschaft, or LPG).

In 1975 the site was taken over by the Museum of the History of Agriculture of the DDR (Agrarhistorisches Museum der DDR). Since 1990 the site has been the home of the Hennebergische Museum, an open-air museum specialising in the display of re-located local buildings.

The abbey church, dedicated to Saint Mary, was converted to the parish church, with much of the space used for storage. Most of the church structure was heavily damaged in a 1939 fire. One chapel continues to be used. The ruins are nevertheless substantial and after stabilisation it remains the most significant Romanesque building in the region. Of the monastic buildings themselves there remain the gate chapel and the accommodation block, including the ruins of the cloister.

== Gallery ==
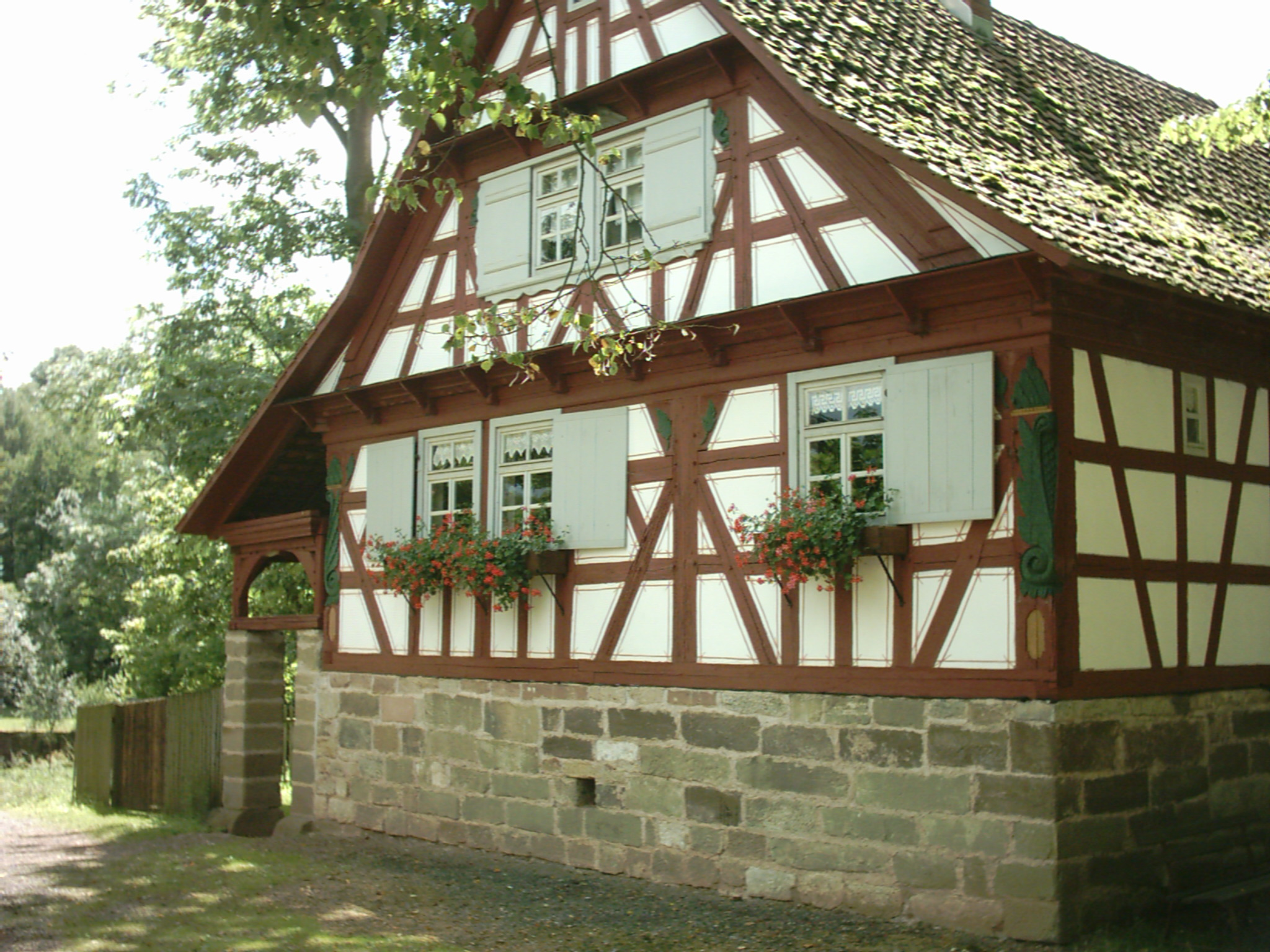
Farmer's house from 1716 in the Henneberg Museum

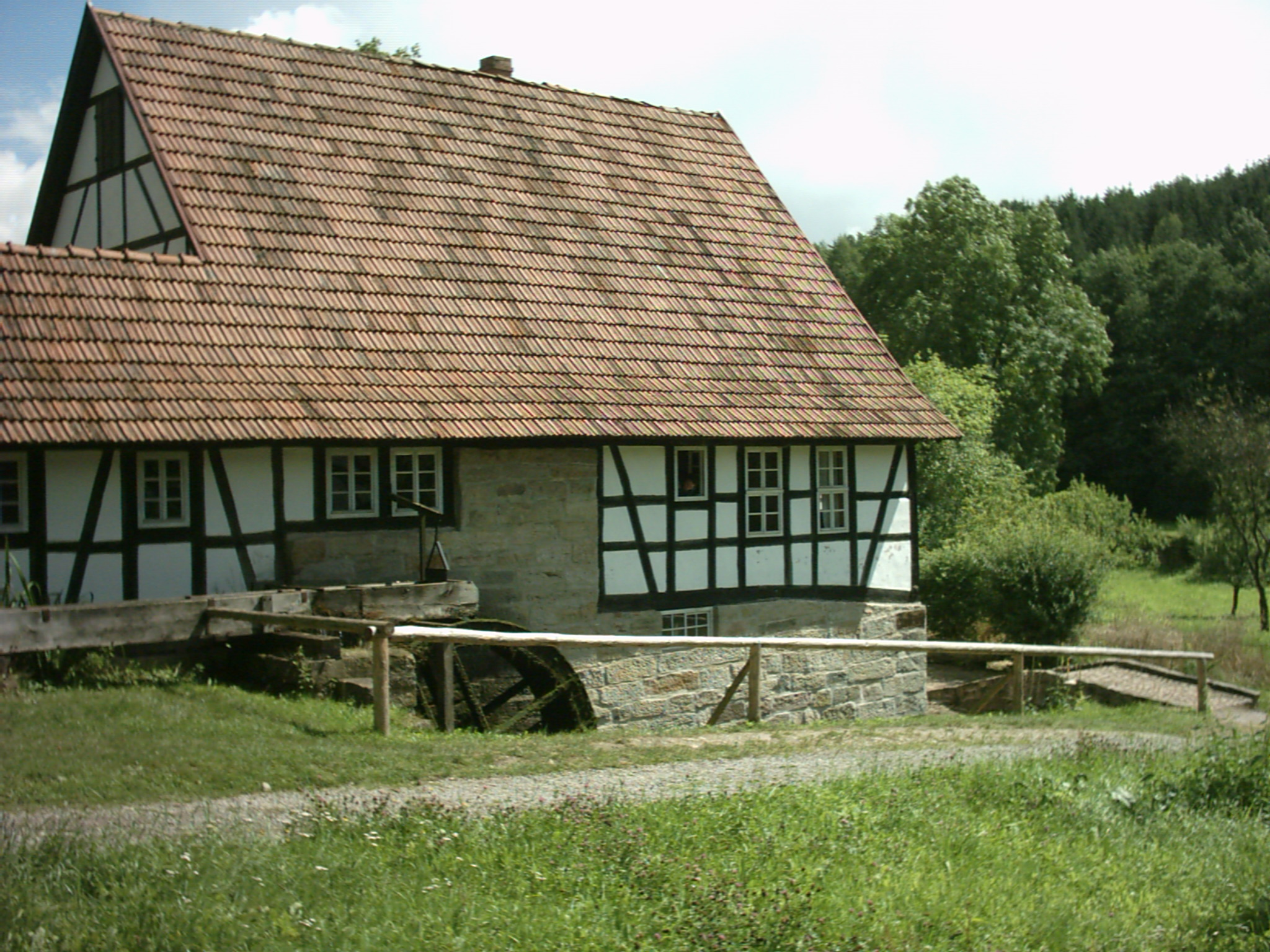
Old watermill from around 1600 in the Henneberg Museum

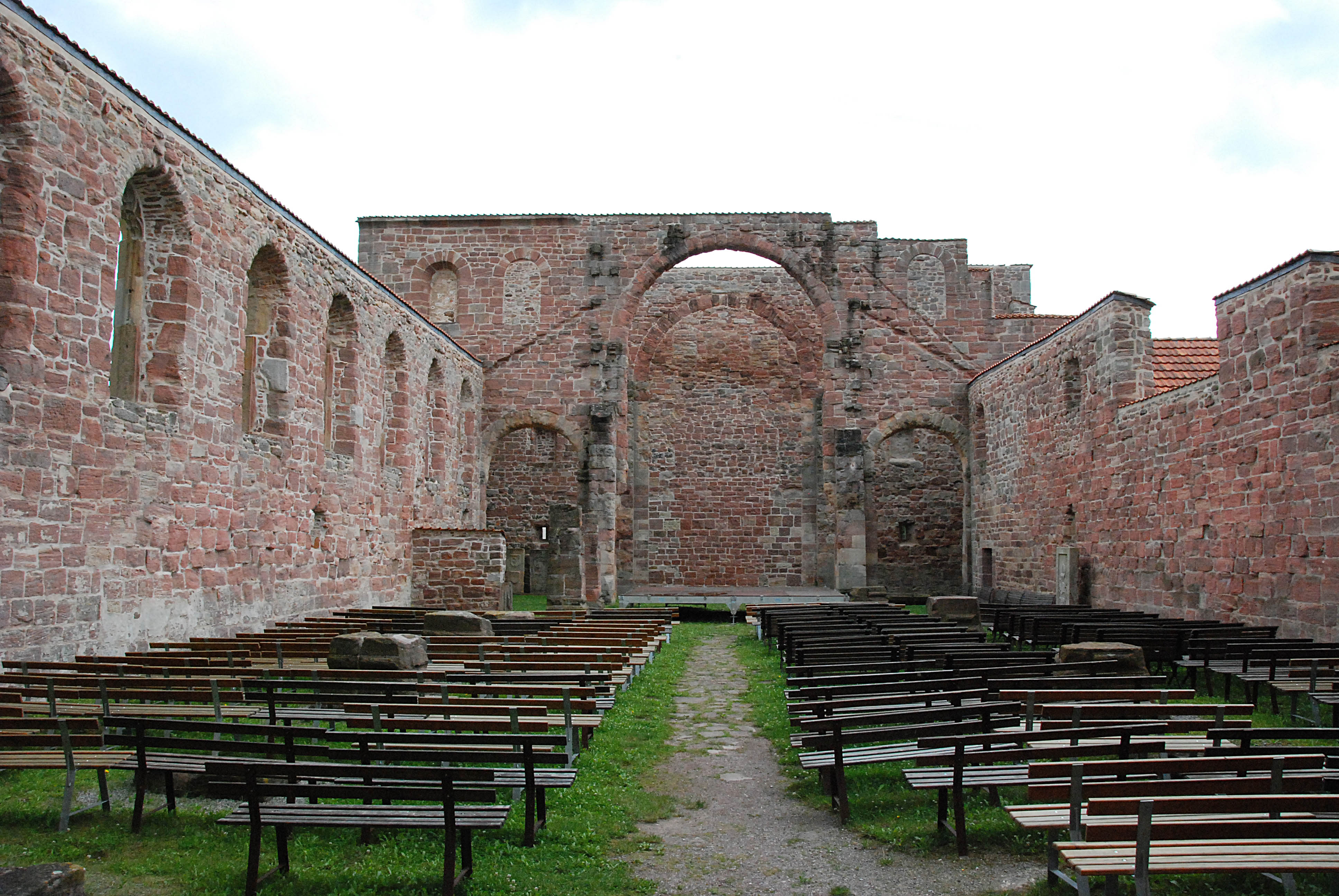
Interior of church

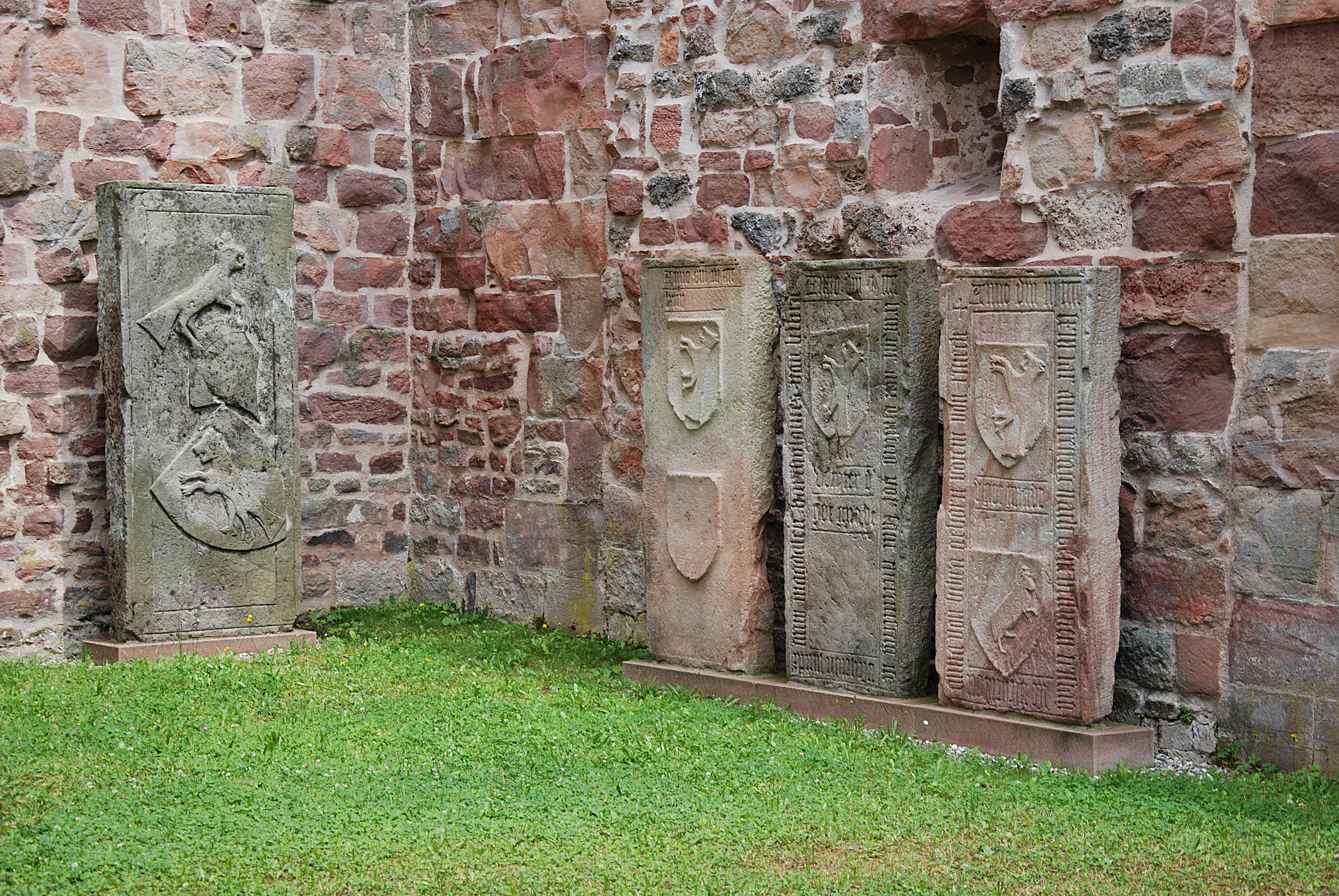
Bibrasche Kapelle with Bibra graves

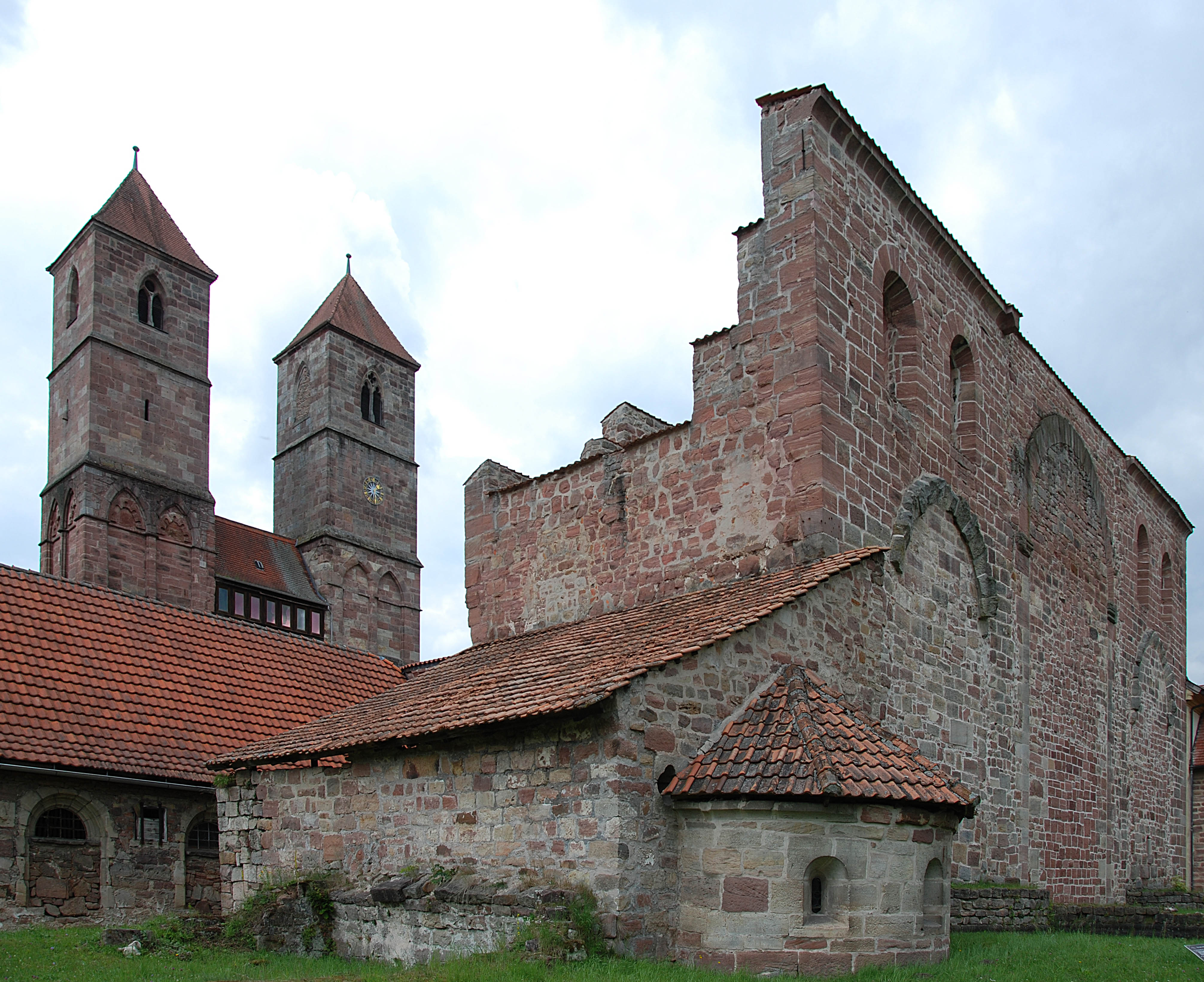
View from the rear

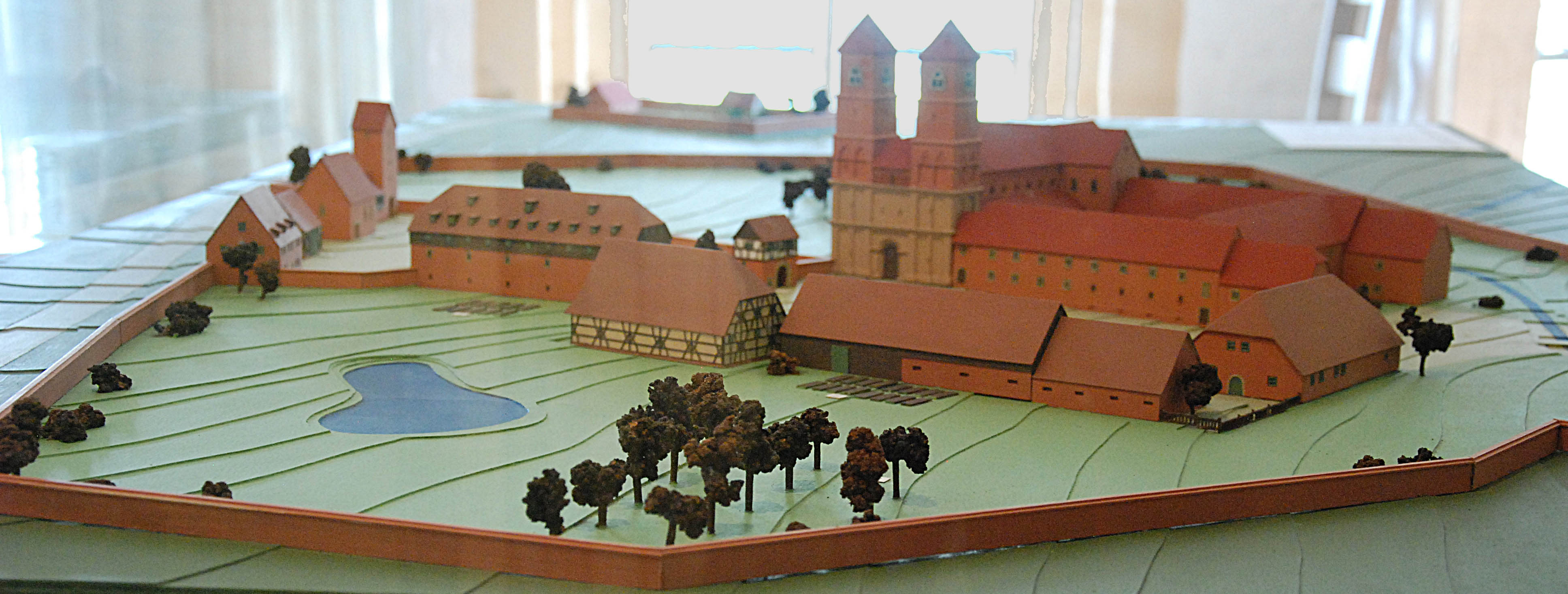
Model in the Henneberg Museum
