= William III of Henneberg-Schleusingen =

William III, Princely count of Henneberg-Schleusingen
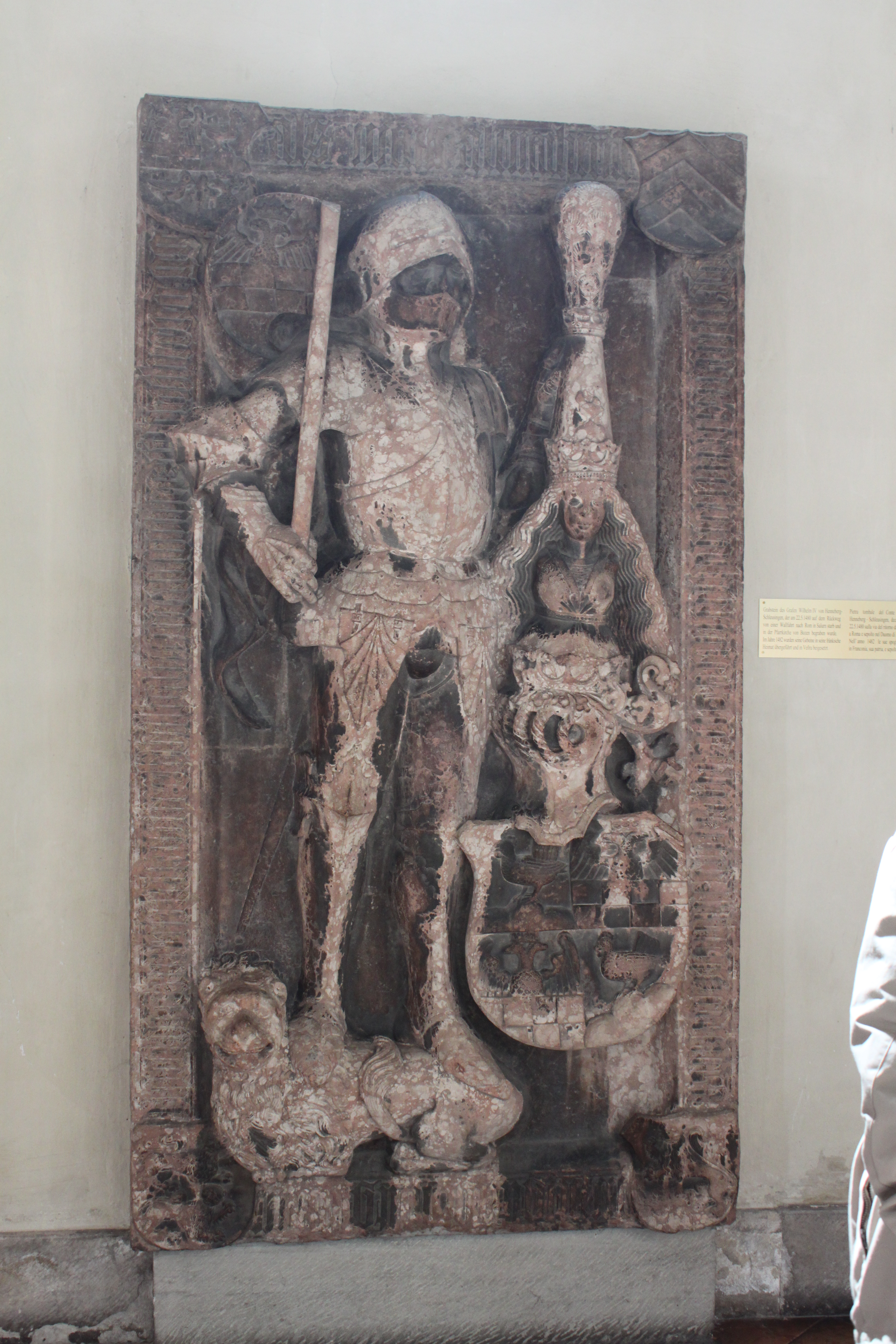
- Wilhelm III's Tombstone, Gothic Cathedral in Bolzano
- Born: 12 March 1434
- Died: 25 May 1480 (aged 46); Salorno
- Buried: Assumption of Mary Church in Bolzano
- Noble family: House of Henneberg
- Father: William II, Princely count of Henneberg-Schleusingen
- Mother: Catherine of Hanau

Princely count William III of Henneberg-Schleusingen (12 March 1434 – 25 May 1480 in Salorno) was a member of the House of Henneberg. He was the son of William II of Henneberg and Catherine of Hanau. William III inherited the princely county of Henneberg in 1440, when his father died in a hunting accident. In 1469, he married Margaret (1451 – 13 February 1509), the daughter of Duke Henry the Peaceful of Brunswick-Lüneburg.

In 1463 or 1464, the imperial city of Schweinfurt transferred the office of Imperial bailiff to William and made him patron of the city. This combination of competencies offered Schweinfurt some degree of protection against the Bishopric of Würzburg. Apparently out of personal piety, William promoted pilgrimages and founded churches and monasteries.

William died in 1480 in Salorno, when he was returning from Rome. His grave stone can be found in the Assumption of Mary Church in Bolzano, near the altar. In 1482, his body was transferred to the Henneberg family vault in the church of the monastery at Kloster Veßra. The epitaph in Bolzano was sculpted by Erasmus Forster in Gardolo near Trento and installed in the Church in 1495 or 1496. Like his father, he left only underage children, including his heir, William IV. His widow, however, succeeded in securing their inheritance.
