= Berthold VII of Henneberg-Schleusingen =

German nobleman (1272–1340)

Berthold VII, Count of Henneberg-Schleusingen
- Born: 1272; Schleusingen
- Died: 13 April 1340; Schleusingen
- Noble family: House of Henneberg
- Spouse: Adelheid of Hesse
- Father: Berthold V of Henneberg-Schleusingen
- Mother: Sophie of Schwarzburg

Berthold VII, Count of Henneberg-Schleusingen (nicknamed the Wise, born: 1272 in Schleusingen; died: 13 April 1340, Schleusingen) was Count of Henneberg- Schleusingen from 1284 to 1340. He was the son of Count Berthold V of Henneberg-Schleusingen (d. 1284) and his wife Sophie of Schwarzburg (d. 1279), the daughter of Count Günther VII of Schwarzburg. He was confirmed as Imperial Prince by Emperor Henry VII in 1310.

From 1323 to 1330, he was guardian and regent of Louis V, Duke of Bavaria, the eldest son of Emperor Louis IV "the Bavarian", who had appointed his son as Margrave of Brandenburg and Count of Tyrol at the age of eight years.

== Marriage and issue ==
Berthold VII married Adelheid (1268–1317), the daughter of Henry I of Hesse. They had three children:

- Henry VIII (died: 10 September 1347), married Judith of Brandenburg-Salzwedel
- John I (born: c. 1300; died: 2 May 1359), married Elisabeth of Leuchtenberg
- Elizabeth (born:1318; died: before 6 December 1377), married Burgrave John II of Nuremberg. She was the paternal grandmother of Frederick I, the first Elector of Brandenburg from the House of Hohenzollern.
