= Henneberg, Thuringia =

Henneberg
- Ortsteil of Meiningen
- Interactive map of Henneberg
- Location within Germany Location within Thuringia
- Coordinates: 50°30′N 10°20′E
- Country: Germany
- State: Thuringia
- District: Schmalkalden-Meiningen
- Town: Meiningen

Area
  - Total: 13.2 km^{2} (5.1 sq mi)
- Elevation: 410 m (1,350 ft)

Population (2017-12-31)
  - Total: 602
  - Density: 45.6/km^{2} (118/sq mi)
- Time zone: UTC+01:00 (CET)
  - Summer (DST): UTC+02:00 (CEST)
- Postal codes: 98617
- Dialling codes: 036945

Henneberg (German pronunciation: [ˈhɛnəbɛʁk]) is a village and a former municipality in the district Schmalkalden-Meiningen, in Thuringia, Germany. Since 1 January 2019, it is part of the town Meiningen. It was the origin of the medieval House of Henneberg.
