= Hartenberg Castle =

Castle ruins in the Czech Republic

Coordinates: 50°13′18.41″N 12°34′32.7″E

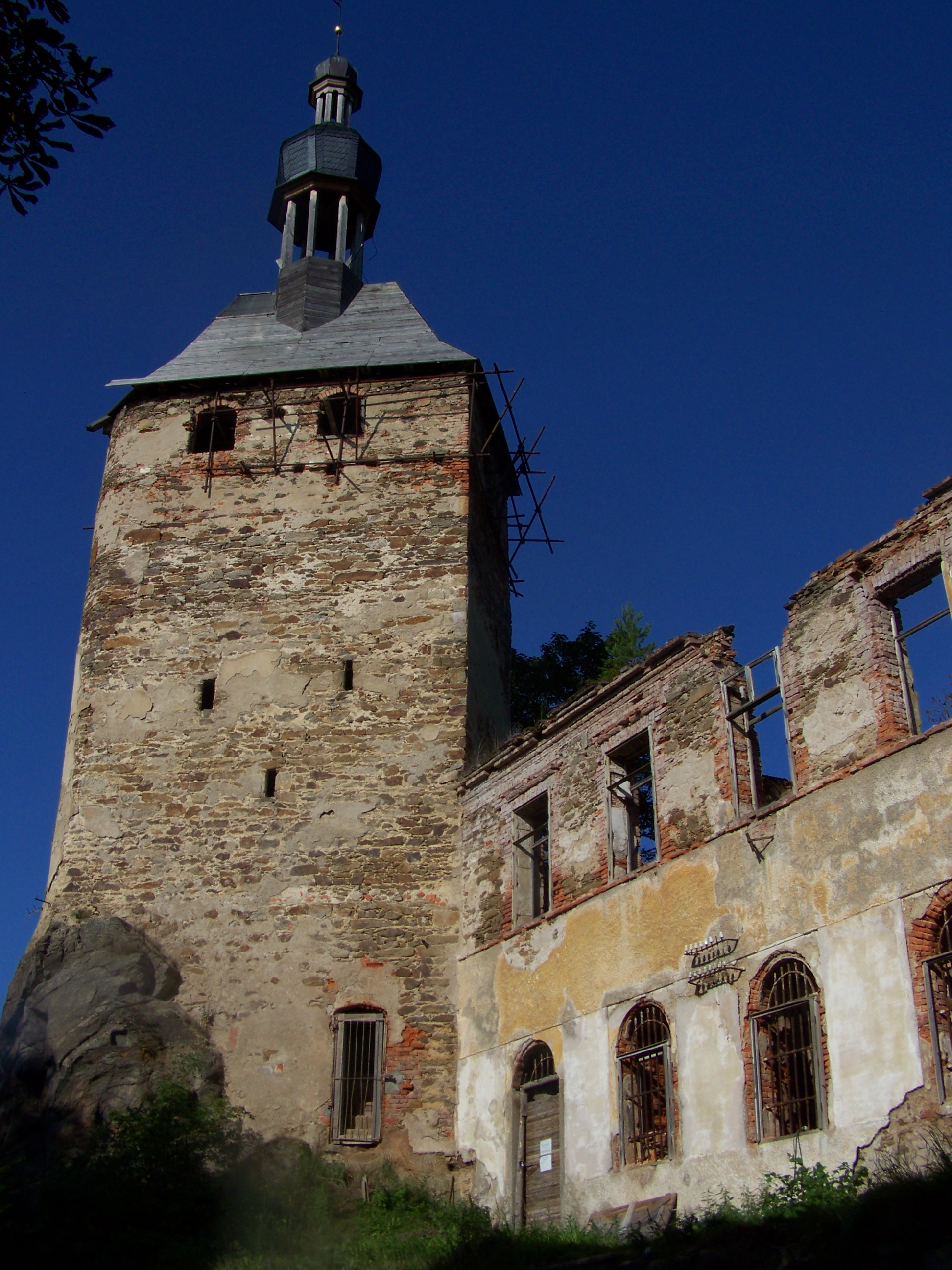
Castle tower with repaired roof

Hartenberg Castle or Hartenberk Castle (Czech: hrad Hartenberg/Hartenberk) is the ruin of a castle over the village of Hřebeny in the municipality of Josefov in the Karlovy Vary Region of the Czech Republic.

== History ==
Hartenberg Castle was built by the lords of Hartenberg, probably in 1196. The first written mention is from 1214. The Hartenberg family owned the castle until 1362, when Těma of Koldice obtained it from them and traded it in 1364 with Charles IV for Bautzen. At the beginning of the 15th century, the Hartenberg family received the castle again but soon sold it to Jan Maleřík. His descendants used the castle as the center of robbery attacks and that was why in 1459 the castle was besieged by the military of the town Cheb, conquered and plundered. Later, the Schlicks owned the castle, the town of Loket and the Písnic family who held it more than 150 years. In the second half of the 18th century, the Ausperg family inherited the castle. From the 17th to the 19th century, modifications occurred. The last owner of Hartenberg was Františka Kopalová who inherited it in 1913 from her mother, Marie. After the Second World War, she was expelled and relocated to Germany.

After 1945, the castle was owned by the State Forestry Service and was used as a warehouse and granary. In 1983, there were plans for its reconstruction, but it never panned out. From 1984–91, the castle was several times deliberately set on fire and turned into ruins.

The castle is now owned by Bedřich Loos, a private owner who tries to maintain and repair the castle. As a result of his ownership, there is now the Hartenberg Workshop. Already, more than a thousand volunteers from all over the world have participated in the repair of the castle.While it is no longer as expansive, this workshop was the largest volunteer program in Europe.

== Gallery ==
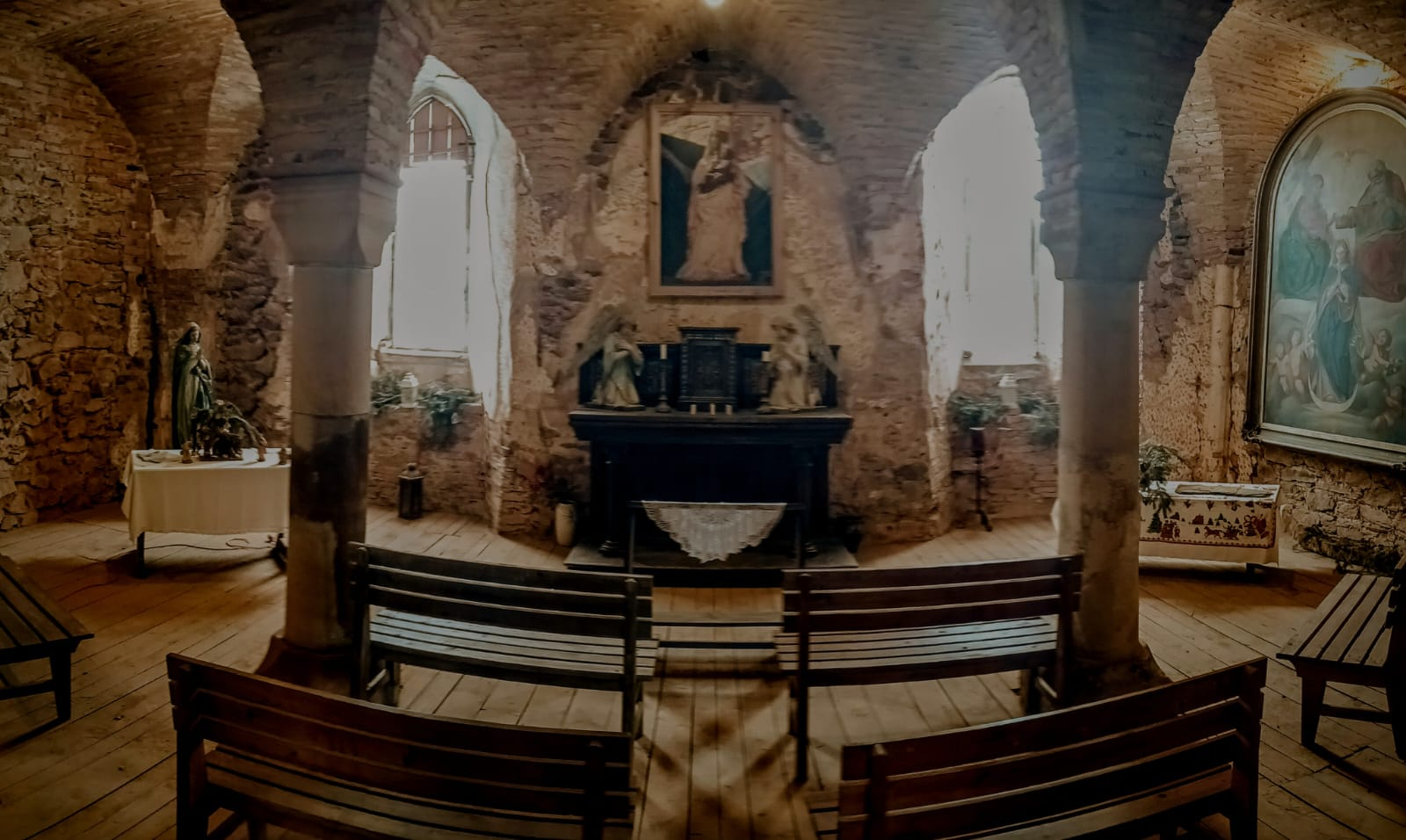
Interior of the castle chapel

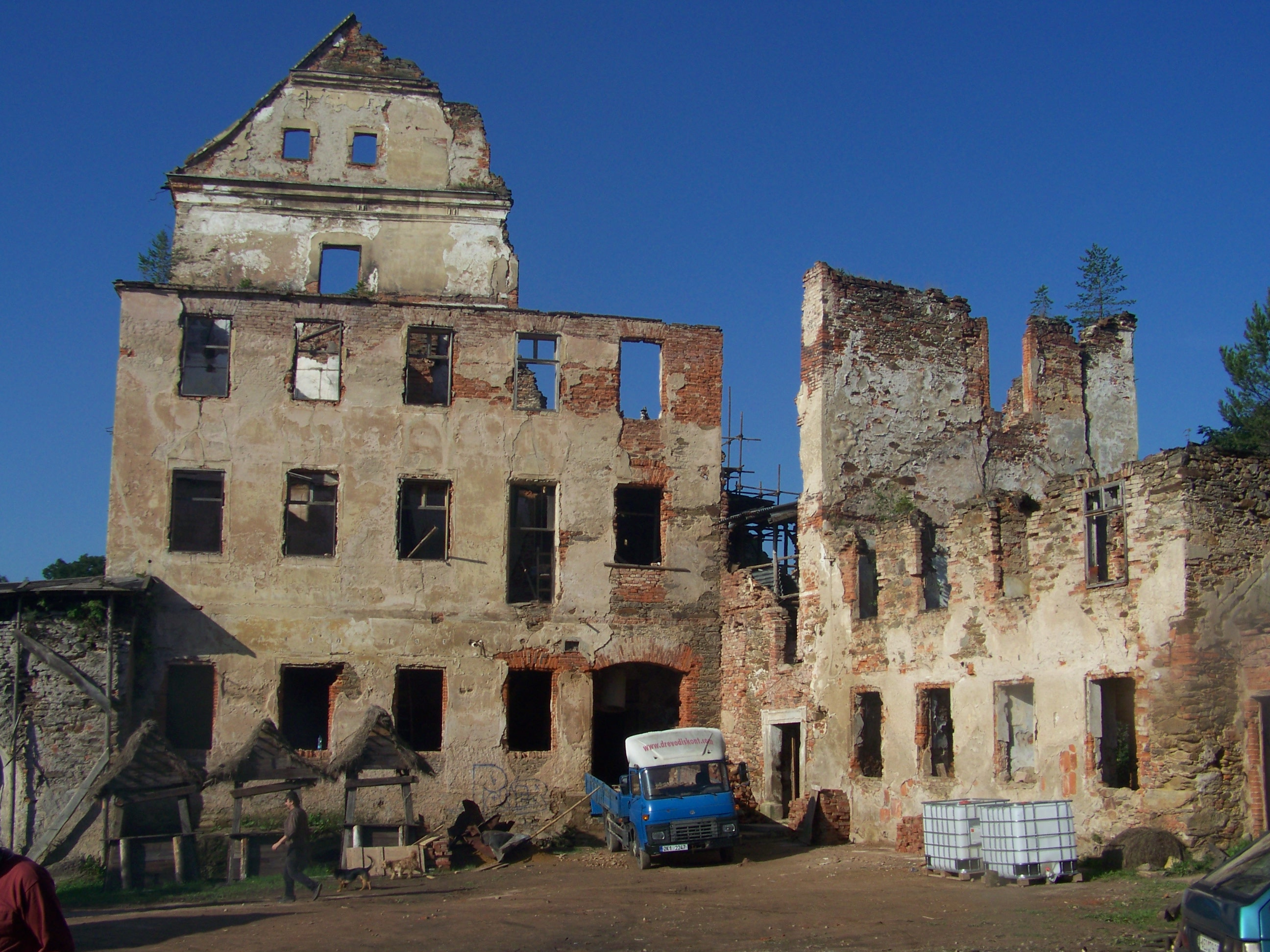
Castle palace from courtyard

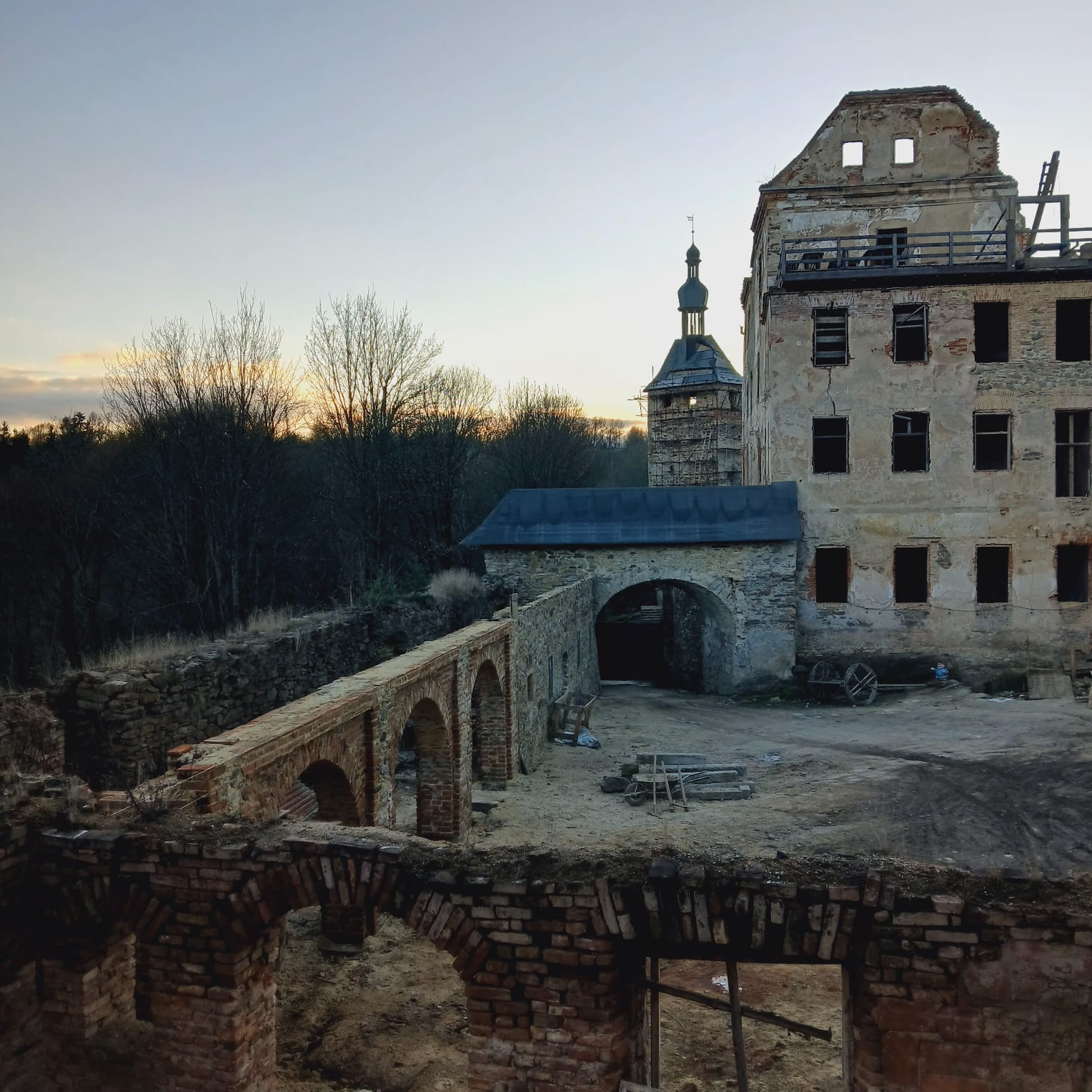
Courtyard

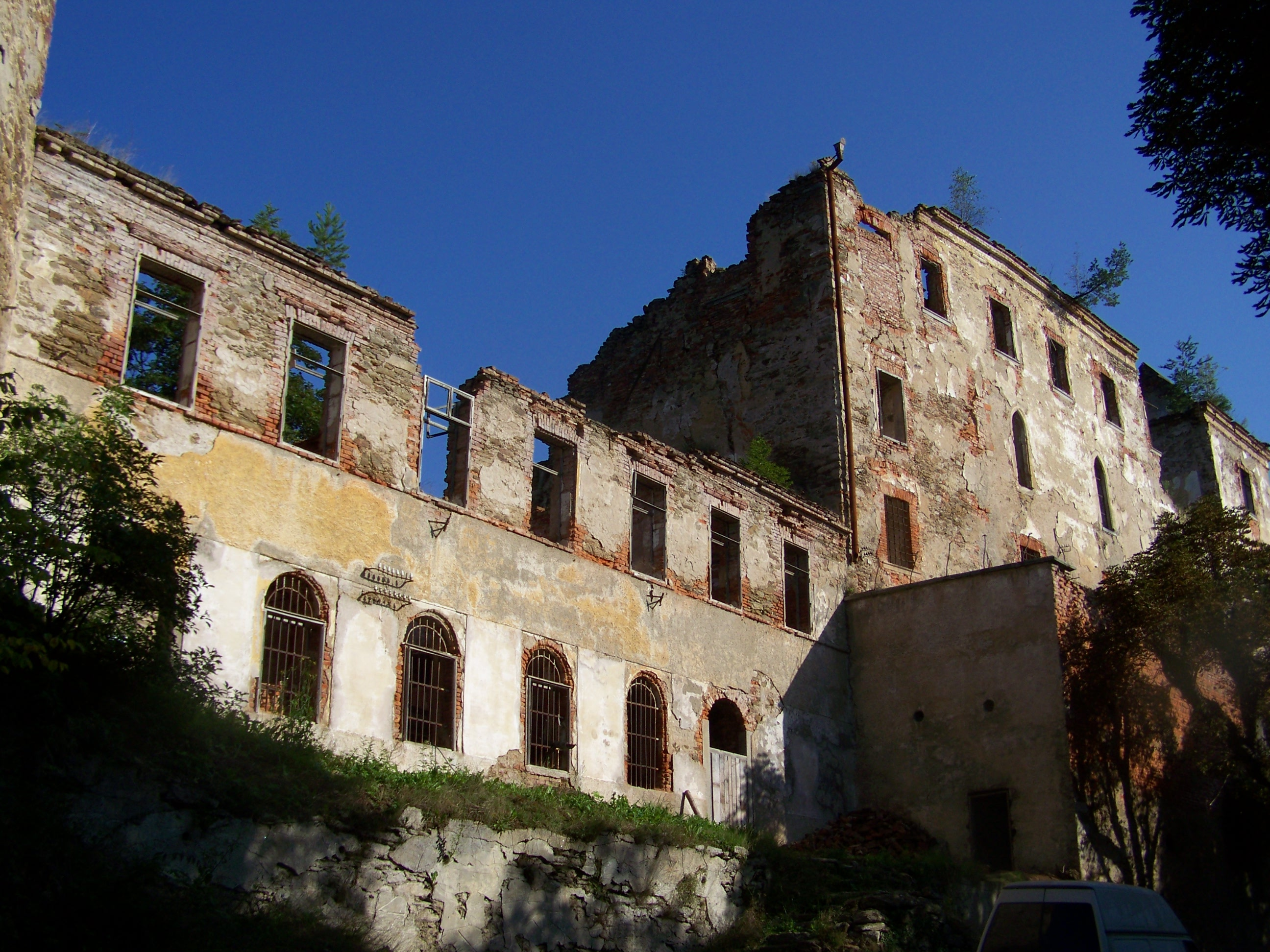
Castle palace from entrance road
