= Katharina of Hanau =

15th-century German regent

Catherine of Hanau
- Born: 25 January 1408
- Died: 25 September 1460 (aged 52); Maßfeld Castle in Untermaßfeld
- Noble family: House of Hanau
- Spouses: Thomas II of Rieneck; William II, Count of Henneberg-Schleusingen
- Father: Reinhard II, Count of Hanau
- Mother: Catherine of Nassau-Beilstein

Catherine of Hanau also known as Katharina (25 January 1408 – 25 September 1460) was a German countess regent. She was the regent of the County of Rieneck during the minority of her son from 1431 until 1434. She was the eldest daughter of Reinhard II, who would become the first Count of Hanau in 1429, and Catherine of Nassau-Beilstein (d. 6 September 1459).

== Countess of Rieneck ==
She first married in 1421, to Count Thomas II of Rieneck (before 1408 – 8 February 1431), who was twice a widower at that time, having been married before to Elisabeth of Henneberg and to Elisabeth of Castell. His first two marriages were childless. Catherine and Thomas were engaged on 14 October 1419. After their marriage, the pair resided at Wildenstein Castle.

They had the following children:

1. Philip the Elder, Count of Grünsfeld, Lauda and Wildenstein (d. 5 December 1488), married to Countess Palatine Amalia of Mosbach (1433 – 15 May 1483), a daughter of Count Palatine Otto I of Mosbach
2. Philip the Younger, Count of Lohr, Gemünden, Brückenau and Schildeck (d. 14 July 1497), who joined the clergy, but reverted to a secular state in 1454 and married Margaret of Eppstein and then in 1465 to Anna of Wertheim-Breuberg.

=== Regency ===
After Thomas' death in 1431, Catherine became the guardian of her children, who were still minors. She ruled as regent for three years. When she remarried in 1434, the guardianship and regency of Rieneck were taken up by her brother Reinhard III.

== Countess of Henneberg-Schleusingen ==
In 1434, Catherine married Count William II of Henneberg-Schleusingen (14 March 1415 – 8 January 1444 in a hunting accident). Catherine and William were engaged on 17 May 1432. On 15 June 1432, Catherine renounced her claim on the County of Rieneck, in exchange for 8000 guilders. From her husband, she received a dowry of 16000 guilder, which was secured with the district and castle of Mainberg Castle, near Schweinfurt.

Catherine and William had the following children:

1. William III (12 March 1434 – 26 May 1480), married Duches Margaret of Brunswick-Wolfenbüttel (1451 – 13 February 1509)
2. Margaret (1437–1491), a nun in the Ilm Convent
3. John II (2 July 1439 – 20 May 1513), from 1472 abbot of Fulda Abbey
4. Berthold XII (b. 9 January 1441), clergyman
5. Berthold XIV (4 March 1443 – 20 April 1495), provost of Bamberg
6. Margaret (10 October 1444 – between 16 February and 3 March 1485), married Count Günther XXXVI of Schwarzburg-Blakenburg (8 July 1439 – 30 December 1503 in Rudolstadt)

Catherine died on 25 September 1460 Massfeld Castle in Untermassfeld.

== Ancestors ==
Ancestors of Katharina of Hanau

8. Ulrich III, Lord of Hanau (1310 – 1369 or 1370)
4. Ulrich IV, Lord of Hanau (betw. 1330/40 – 1380)
9. Countess Adelaide of Nassau (d. 1344)
2. Reinhard II, Count of Hanau (c. 1369 – 1451)
10. Count Eberhard of Wertheim (d. 1373)
5. Countess Elisabeth of Wertheim (1347–1378)
11. Burgravine Catherine of Hohenzollern (d. after 1369)
1. Catherine of Hanau
12. Henry I, Count of Nassau-Beilstein (d. 1378/1380)
6. Henry II, Count of Nassau-Beilstein (d. 1412)
13. Meyna of Westerburg (d. 1388)
3. Catherine of Nassau-Beilstein (d. 1459)
14. Arnold of Randerode
7. Catherine of Randerode (d. c. 1415)
