= House of Henneberg =

German noble family

Henneberg
- Parent house: Popponids (Babenberg) in turn from the Robertians
- Titles: Princely Counts of Henneberg
- Estate: County of Henneberg

(Princely) County of Henneberg (Gefürstete) Grafschaft Henneberg (de)
- c. 1037–1660
- Coat of arms

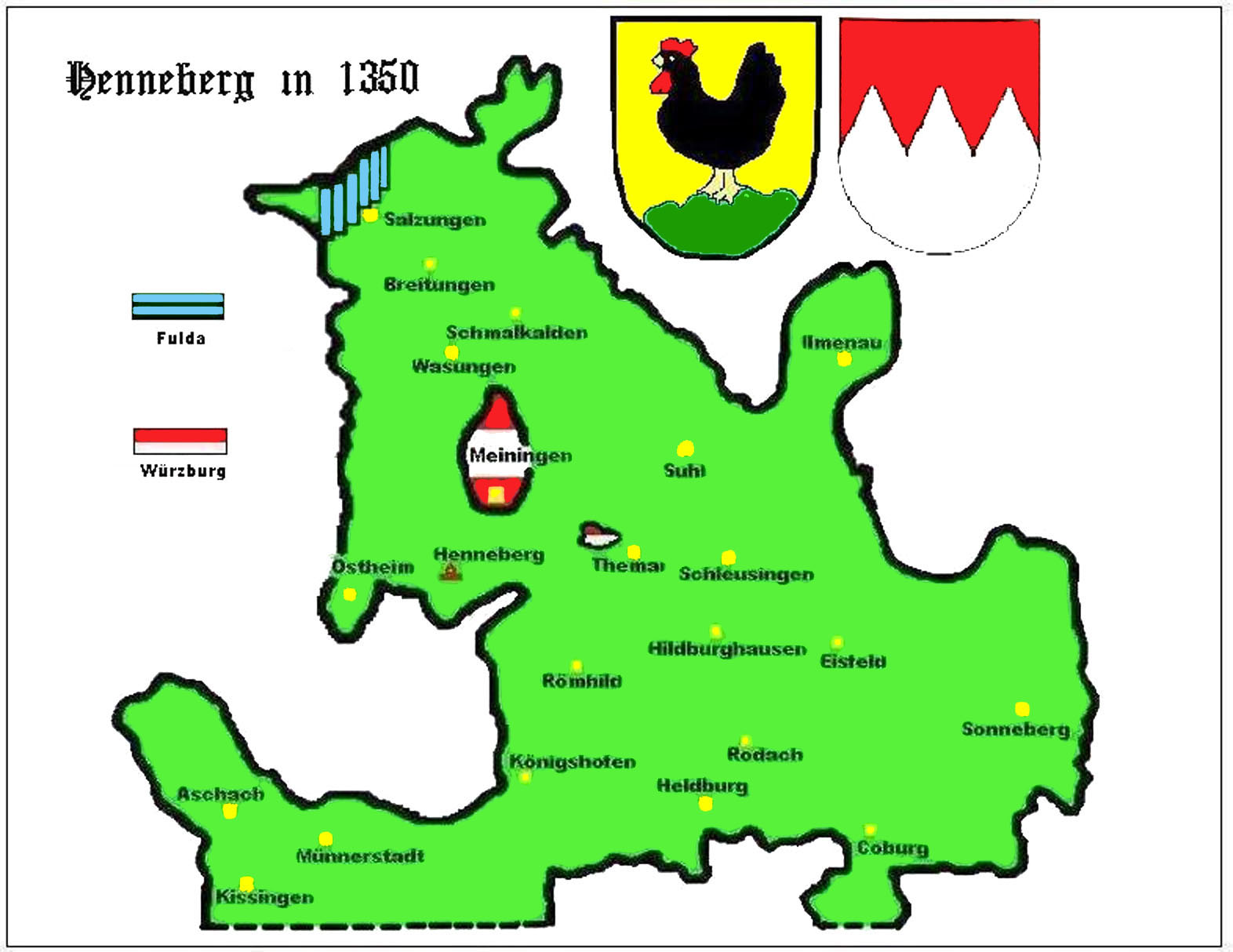
- County of Henneberg around 1350
- Status: Principality
- Capital: Henneberg; Schleusingen; Römhild
- Common languages: East Franconian
- Historical era: Middle Ages, Renaissance
  - Poppo I, first count: c. 1037
  - Internally divided: 1274
  - Raised to principality: 1310
  - Joined Franconian Circle: 1500
  - Schleusingen branch extinct: 1583
  - Divided: 1660
Preceded by
Duchy of Franconia
Succeeded by
Saxe-Weimar
Saxe-Gotha
Saxe-Zeitz

The House of Henneberg was a medieval German comital family (Grafen) which from the 11th century onwards held large territories in the Duchy of Franconia. Their county was raised to a princely county (Gefürstete Grafschaft) in 1310.

Upon the extinction of the line in the late 17th century, most of the territory was inherited by the Saxon House of Wettin and subsequently incorporated into the Thuringian estates of its Ernestine branch.

== Origins ==
The distant origins of this family are speculative yet seem to originate in the Middle Rhine Valley, east of modern-day France. Charibert, a nobleman in Neustria is the earliest recorded ancestor of the family, dating before 636. Five generations pass between Charibert and the next descendant of note, Robert III of Worms. Both the Capetian dynasty and the Popponids (Elder House of Babenberg) are direct male lineal descendants of Count Robert I and therefore referred to as Robertians. Of the Popponids, the Henneberg are most likely to descend from Poppo, Duke of Thuringia.

The designation Babenberger, from the castle of Bamberg (Babenberch), was established in the 12th century by the chronicler Otto of Freising, himself a member of the Babenberg family. The later Younger or Austrian House of Babenberg, which ruled what became the Duchy of Austria, claimed to come of the Elder Babenberg dynasty. However, the descent of the first margrave Leopold I of Austria († 994) from the Elder Babenberger remains uncertain.

== County of Henneberg ==
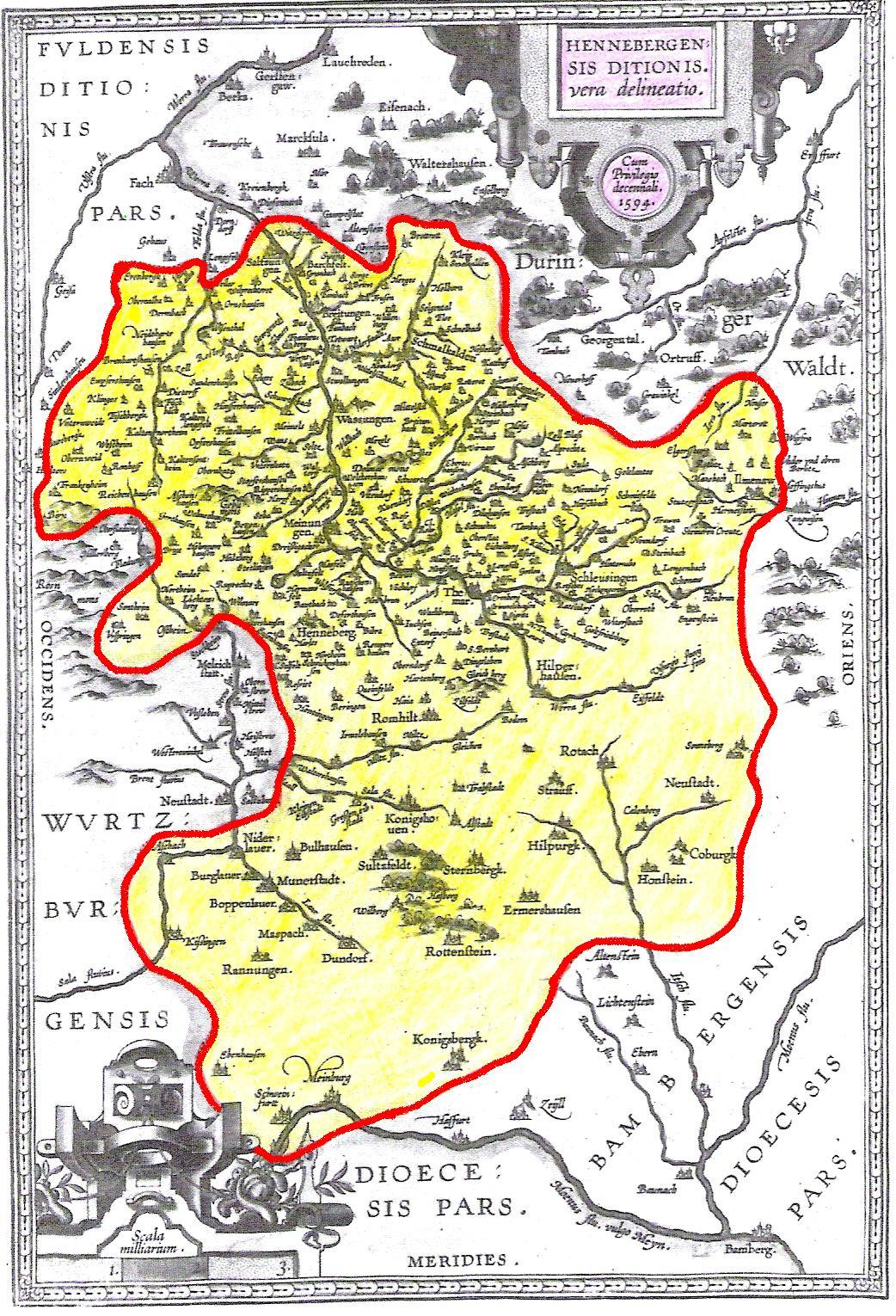
Henneberg map dated 1594 and prior

In the 11th century, the dynasty's estates around the ancestral seat Henneberg Castle near Meiningen belonged to the German stem duchy of Franconia. They were located southwest of the Rennsteig ridge in the Thuringian Forest, then forming the border with the possessions held by the Landgraves of Thuringia in the north. In 1096 one Count Godebold II of Henneberg served as a burgrave of the Würzburg bishops, his father Poppo had been killed in battle in 1078. In 1137 he established Vessra Abbey near Hildburghausen as the family's house monastery.

The counts lost their position as the bishops were raised to "Dukes of Franconia" in the 12th century. Nevertheless, in the course of the War of the Thuringian Succession upon the death of Landgrave Henry Raspe, Count Herman I of Henneberg (1224–1290) in 1247 received the Thuringian lordship of Schmalkalden from the Wettin margrave Henry III of Meissen.

After the extinction of the Bavarian House of Andechs upon the death of Duke Otto II of Merania in 1248, the Counts of Henneberg also inherited their Franconian lordship of Coburg (then called the "new lordship", later Saxe-Coburg).

In 1274 the Henneberg estates were divided into the Schleusingen, Aschach-Römhild and Hartenberg branches. Count Berthold VII of Henneberg-Schleusingen (1272–1340) was elevated to princely status in 1310, his estates comprised the towns of Schmalkalden, Suhl and Coburg. In 1343 the Counts of Hennberg also purchased the Thuringian town of Ilmenau. The Coburg lands passed to the Saxon House of Wettin upon the marriage of Countess Catherine of Henneberg to Margrave Frederick III of Meissen in 1347.

After the Imperial Reform of 1500, the County of Henneberg formed the northernmost part of the Franconian Circle, bordering on the Upper Saxon Ernestine duchies and the lands of the Upper Rhenish prince-abbacy of Fulda in the northwest. A thorn in the side remained the enclave of Meiningen, a fief held by the Bishops of Würzburg, which was not acquired by the counts until 1542.

== Disestablishment ==
Whereas the male line of the House of Babenberg became extinct in 1246, the Counts of Henneberg lived on until 1583. In 1554 William IV of Henneberg-Schleusingen had signed a treaty of inheritance with Duke John Frederick II of Saxony. However, when the last Count George Ernest of Henneberg died, both the Ernestine and the Albertine branch of the Wettin dynasty claimed his estates, that were finally divided in 1660 among the Ernestine duchies of Saxe-Weimar and Saxe-Gotha and the Albertine duke Maurice of Saxe-Zeitz. The Lordship of Schmalkalden fell to Landgrave William IV of Hesse-Kassel, according to an inheritance treaty of 1360.

After the Congress of Vienna (1815), the former Albertine parts around Schleusingen and Suhl fell to the Prussian province of Saxony. King Frederick William III of Prussia assumed the title of a Princely Count of Henneberg, which his successors in the House of Hohenzollern have borne ever since.

== Counts of Henneberg ==
=== House of Henneberg ===
Partitions of Henneberg under Henneberg rule

County of Henneberg (1052–1262) (Gotboldian line from 1091)					County of Frankenstein (Popponian line) (1091–1354)
County of Henneberg (1052–1262) (Gotboldian line from 1091)					County of Irmelshausen then County of Lichtenberg (1144–1255)
County of Botenlauben then County of Hildenburg (1190–1251)				Burgraviate of Wurzburg (1190–1218)	County of Irmelshausen then County of Lichtenberg (1144–1255)
Sold to the Prince-Bishopric of Würzburg					County of Irmelshausen then County of Lichtenberg (1144–1255)
Sold to the Prince-Bishopric of Würzburg				County of Coburg (1st creation) (1245–1312)	County of Irmelshausen then County of Lichtenberg (1144–1255)
Sold to the Prince-Bishopric of Würzburg	County of Hartenberg (1st creation) (1262–1371)	County of Aschach (1262–1390)	County of Schleusingen (1262–1583)	County of Coburg (1st creation) (1245–1312)
Sold to the Prince-Bishopric of Würzburg	County of Hartenberg (1st creation) (1262–1371)	County of Aschach (1262–1390)	County of Schleusingen (1262–1583)	Annexed to Brandenburg- Salzwedel (1312–1353)
Sold to the Prince-Bishopric of Würzburg	County of Hartenberg (1st creation) (1262–1371)	County of Aschach (1262–1390)	County of Schleusingen (1262–1583)	Annexed to Brandenburg- Salzwedel (1312–1353)	Inherited by the Stein zu Nord-Ostheim family
Sold to the Prince-Bishopric of Würzburg			County of Schleusingen (1262–1583)	County of Coburg (2nd creation) (1340-1397)	Inherited by the Stein zu Nord-Ostheim family
Sold to the Prince-Bishopric of Würzburg	Renamed; County of Hartenberg (2nd creation) (1390–1535)		County of Schleusingen (1262–1583)	Annexed to the House of Wettin	Inherited by the Stein zu Nord-Ostheim family
Sold to the Prince-Bishopric of Würzburg	County of Römhild (1535–1549)	County of Schwarza (1535–1577)	County of Schleusingen (1262–1583)	Annexed to the House of Wettin	Inherited by the Stein zu Nord-Ostheim family
Sold to the Prince-Bishopric of Würzburg	Sold to the County of Mansfeld (1549–55); Sold to the Electorate of Saxony (from 1555)	Annexed to the County of Stolberg	County of Schleusingen (1262–1583)	Annexed to the House of Wettin	Inherited by the Stein zu Nord-Ostheim family
Sold to the Prince-Bishopric of Würzburg	Sold to the County of Mansfeld (1549–55); Sold to the Electorate of Saxony (from 1555)	Annexed to the County of Stolberg	Divided between Hesse-Kassel and Saxony	Annexed to the House of Wettin	Inherited by the Stein zu Nord-Ostheim family

Table of rulers

(Note: There are two manners for numbering the rulers of this noble family: birth numbers or regnal numbers. Albeit the birth number is more commonly used, the table uses the sequential regnal numbers presented in Stammliste von Henneberg, to avoid confusion or holes in the counting. According to this alternative numbering, there's a different counting for Frankenstein and Lichtenberg (from 1190 onwards). All the other members of the family use one only counting. However, even this alternative counting is not perfect: it counts only the ruling members, but by birth order, which means that people with higher count may start to rule first than others. These cases will be pointed out in the table.)

Ruler	Born	Reign	Ruling part	Consort	Death	Notes
Poppo I	c. 1030? First son of ?	1052 – 7 August 1078	County of Henneberg	Hildegard of Thuringia two children	7 August 1078; Mellrichstadt aged c. 47 – 48	Founder of the county. Died fighting in the Battle of Mellrichstadt.
Gotebold I	c. 1030? Second son of ?	7 August 1078 – 1091	County of Henneberg	Unmarried	c. 1091 aged c. 60 – 61	Brother of the predecessor, left no heirs. The county was divided between the sons of Poppo I.
Gotebold II	c. 1070? First son of Poppo I and Hildegard of Thuringia	1091 – 6 February 1144	County of Henneberg (Goteboldian line)	Lutgard of Hohenberg (d. 3 June 1145) six children	6 February 1144 aged c. 77 – 78?	Children of Poppo I, divided their inheritance.
Poppo II	c. 1070? Second son of Poppo I and Hildegard of Thuringia	1091 – 21 August 1118	County of Frankenstein (Popponian line)	Beatrix of Gleichen four children	21 August 1118 aged c. 57 – 58?	Children of Poppo I, divided their inheritance.
Louis I	c. 1100; First son of Poppo II and Beatrix of Gleichen	21 August 1118 – 1164	County of Frankenstein	A woman from Zimmern five children	1164 aged 63–64?	Children of Poppo II, divided their inheritance.
Poppo III	c. 1100; Second son of Poppo II and Beatrix of Gleichen	21 August 1118 – 1156	County of Irmelshausen	Unknown three children	1156 aged 55–56?	Children of Poppo II, divided their inheritance.
Poppo IV	c. 1128; First son of Gotebold II and Lutgard of Hohenberg	6 February 1144 – 1 September 1156	County of Henneberg	Irmgard of Stade no children	1 September 1156 aged 27–28	Left no children. The land passed to his brother.
Henry I	c. 1130? First son of Poppo III	1156 – 1167	County of Irmelshausen	Unmarried	1167 aged 36–37?	Left no children. The land passed to his brothers.
Berthold I	c. 1130; Würzburg; Second son of Gotebold II and Lutgard of Hohenberg	1 September 1156 – 18 October 1159	County of Henneberg	Bertha of Putelendorf three children	18 October 1159; Palestine aged 28–29	Died abroad, possibly in pilgrimage.
Regency of Bertha of Putelendorf (1159 – 1164)						Like his father, he died abroad, either in pilgrimage or a crusade.
Poppo VI	c. 1150; Son of Berthold I and Bertha of Putelendorf	18 October 1159 – 14 June 1190	County of Henneberg	Sophia of Andechs (d. 2 June 1218) c. 1182 four children	14 June 1190; Margat aged 39–40?	Like his father, he died abroad, either in pilgrimage or a crusade.
Poppo V / I	c. 1130? Second son of Poppo III	1156 – 29 May 1199	County of Irmelshausen (at Lichtenberg) renamed County of Lichtenberg	Irmgard of Rothausen one child	29 May 1199 aged 68–69?	Younger sons of Poppo III, divided their inheritance
Godebold III	c. 1130? Third son of Poppo III	1156 – 1190	County of Irmelshausen (at Irmelshausen proper)	Unknown one child	c. 1190 aged 59–60?	Younger sons of Poppo III, divided their inheritance
Irmelshausen inherited by Hildenburg, later inherited by Henneberg-Botenlauben line, and finally sold to the County of Schleusingen (see below)
Louis II	c. 1150? Son of Louis I	1164 – 1197	County of Frankenstein	Unknown two children	1197 aged 46–47	
Berthold II	c. 1170? First son of Poppo VI and Sophia of Andechs	14 June 1190 – 24 August 1212	Burgraviate of Würzburg	Kunigunde of Abensberg one child Matilda of Esvelt no children	24 August 1212 aged 41–42?	Children of Poppo VI, divided their inheritance. In 1218, Poppo VII inherited Wurzburg from his nephew. In 1234, Otto sold Botenlauben to the Diocese of Würzburg.
Poppo VII	c. 1170? Second son of Poppo VI and Sophia of Andechs	14 June 1190 – 21 August 1245	County of Henneberg	Elisabeth of Wildburg; 1217 four children Jutta Claricia of Thuringia; 3 January 1223; Leipzig five children	21 August 1245 aged 74-75?	Children of Poppo VI, divided their inheritance. In 1218, Poppo VII inherited Wurzburg from his nephew. In 1234, Otto sold Botenlauben to the Diocese of Würzburg.
Otto I	c. 1177; Henneberg; Third son of Poppo VI and Sophia of Andechs	14 June 1190 – 1234	County of Botenlauben	Beatrix de Courtenay; 1208 three children	3/4 October 1244; Bad Kissingen aged 66–67	Children of Poppo VI, divided their inheritance. In 1218, Poppo VII inherited Wurzburg from his nephew. In 1234, Otto sold Botenlauben to the Diocese of Würzburg.
Otto II	c. 1200? Son of Otto I and Beatrix de Courtenay	1220/1228 –22 September 1249	County of Botenlauben renamed County of Hildenburg (with Irmelshausen)	Adelaide of Hildenburg; 1228 one child	22 September 1249 aged 48–49	Probably co-ruled with his father in Botenlauben before the sale of the property. From 1228, he was count of Hildenburg through marriage.
In 1234 Botenlauben was sold to the Diocese of Würzburg
Albert	c. 1170? Son of Louis II	1197 – 26 October 1233	County of Frankenstein	Unknown two children	26 October 1233 aged 62–63	
Henry II	c. 1170? Son of Poppo V / I and Irmgard of Rothausen	29 May 1199 – 6 December 1228	County of Lichtenberg	A woman from Wildberg five children	6 December 1228; Meiningen aged 57–58?	Died fighting in Meiningen.
Berthold III	c. 1190? Son of Berthold II and Kunigunde of Abensberg	24 August 1212 – 1219	Burgraviate of Würzburg	Matilda of Hachberg no children	1219 aged 28–29?	After his death with no heirs, Würzburg returned to Henneberg.
In 1219 Würzburg was reannexed to Henneberg
Albert	c. 1190? Son of Henry II	6 December 1228 – October/January 1253/55	County of Lichtenberg	Matilda of Trimberg one child	October 1253/January 1255 aged 63–65	
Louis III	c. 1190? Son of Albert	26 October 1233 – 11 January 1263	County of Frankenstein	Unknown two children	11 January 1263 aged 52–53	Also Vogt of the Monastery of Herrenbreiungen.
Henry II	c.1220 Henneberg; Son of Poppo VII and Elisabeth of Wildburg	21 August 1245 – 9 April 1262	County of Henneberg	Elisabeth of Teck four children Sophia of Meissen three children	9 April 1262 aged 41-42	Children of Poppo VII, they divided their inheritance.
Herman I	1224; Son of Poppo VII and Jutta Claricia of Thuringia	21 August 1245 – 18 December 1290	County of Coburg	Margaret of Holland; 1249 two children	18 December 1290 aged 65-66	Children of Poppo VII, they divided their inheritance.
Adalbert	c. 1230? Son of Otto II and Adelaide of Hildenburg	22 September 1249 – July 1251	County of Hildenburg (with Irmelshausen)	Unmarried	July 1251 aged 20–21?	Left no descendants. After his death, his domain went to the Diocese of Würzburg
In 1251 Hildenburg was annexed to the Diocese of Würzburg; Irmelshausen went to Schleusingen
Luitgard	c. 1240? Daughter of Albert and Matilda of Trimberg	October/January 1253/55 – February 1312	County of Lichtenberg	Henry of Frankenstein (d. 1297) one child	February 1312 aged 71–72?	After her husband's premature death, and without descendants herself, her county went, after her own death, to her brother-in-law, the Count of Frankenstein.
In 1312 Lichtenberg was annexed to Frankenstein
Henry III	c.1240 Son of Henry II and Elisabeth of Teck	9 April 1262 – December 1317	County of Hartenberg	Margaret of Meissen no children Kunigunde of Wertheim (d.9 October 1331); 3 May 1287 seven children	c. December 1317 aged 76-77	Children of Henry II, divided their inheritance.
Berthold IV	c.1248 Schleusingen; First son of Henry II and Sophia of Meissen	9 April 1262 – 15 September 1284	County of Schleusingen	Sophia of Schwarzburg-Blankenburg (d.13 February 1279) c. March 1268; Elgersburg eight children	15 September 1284; Montpellier aged 35-36	Children of Henry II, divided their inheritance.
Herman II	c.1250 Second son of Henry II and Sophia of Meissen	9 April 1262 – 9 February 1292	County of Aschach	Adelaide of Trimberg (d.1316/1318); 25 March 1277 six children	9 February 1292 aged 41-42	Children of Henry II, divided their inheritance.
Henry I	c. 1230? Son of Louis III	11 January 1263 – December 1295	County of Frankenstein	Luitgard of Henneberg-Schleusingen eight children	December 1295 aged 64–65?	
Berthold V the Wise	1272; First son of Berthold IV and Sophia of Schwarzburg-Blankenburg	15 September 1284 – 13 April 1340	County of Schleusingen	Adelaide of Hesse; 1284 five children Anna of Hohenlohe (d.1323) no children	13 April 1340 aged 67-68	Children of Berthold V, ruled jointly. Berthold V was made regent for Louis V of Bavaria between 1323 and 1330, and Berthold VI was Knight Hospitaller.
Berthold VI the Younger	c. 1280; Second son of Berthold IV and Sophia of Schwarzburg-Blankenburg	15 September 1284 – 21 August 1330	County of Schleusingen	Unmarried	21 August 1330 aged 49-50	Children of Berthold V, ruled jointly. Berthold V was made regent for Louis V of Bavaria between 1323 and 1330, and Berthold VI was Knight Hospitaller.
Henry IV	c. 1280; Third son of Berthold IV and Sophia of Schwarzburg-Blankenburg	15 September 1284 – 12 March 1340	County of Schleusingen	Unmarried	12 March 1340 aged 59-60	Children of Berthold V, ruled jointly. Berthold V was made regent for Louis V of Bavaria between 1323 and 1330, and Berthold VI was Knight Hospitaller.
Poppo VIII	c.1254 Son of Herman I and Margaret of Holland	18 December 1290 – 4 February 1291	County of Coburg	Sophia of Bavaria; 1277; Landshut no children	4 February 1291; Strauf Castle aged 36-37	Left no descendants, and the county passed to his sister.
Judith	c.1250 Daughter of Herman I and Margaret of Holland	4 February 1291 – 13 September 1327	County of Coburg	Otto V, Margrave of Brandenburg-Salzwedel; 22 October 1268; Freiburg seven children	13 September 1327 aged 76-77	After her death, the county was inherited by Brandenburg, but would soon return to the family.
Coburg annexed to Brandenburg-Salzwedel
Herman III	c.1277 First son of Herman II and Adelaide of Trimberg	9 February 1292 – 12 July 1307	County of Aschach	Katharina of Głogów no children	12 July 1307 aged 29-30	Children of Herman II, ruled jointly.
Henry V	c.1280 Second son of Herman II and Adelaide of Trimberg	9 February 1292 – 1355/6	County of Aschach	Sophia of Käfernburg (d. 4 March 1358) c.3 March 1315 five children	Between 14 August 1355 and 26 January 1356 aged 74-76	Children of Herman II, ruled jointly.
Henry II	c. 1270? First son of Henry I and Luitgard of Henneberg-Schleusingen	December 1295 – April/May 1326/7	County of Frankenstein	Elisabeth of Thuringia; 11 April 1291 seven children	Between 26 April 1326 and 25 March 1327 aged 55–57	In 1312 inherited, from his sister-in-law, the county of Irmelshausen. Despite having children, his descendants were displaced from Frankenstein in favor of his younger brother Louis.
Poppo IX	1286; Son of Henry III and Kunigunde of Wertheim	December 1317 – 30 July 1349	County of Hartenberg	Elisabeth of Castell no children Richeza of Hohenlohe-Weikersheim; 6 November 1316 five children	30 July 1349 aged 62-63	
Louis IV	c. 1270? Second son of Henry I and Luitgard of Henneberg-Schleusingen	April/May 1326/7 – October 1334	County of Frankenstein	Adelaide of Weilnau two children	September/October 1334 aged 63–64	Brother of the predecessor.
Elisabeth	c. 1290? Daughter of Louis IV and Adelaide of Weilnau	October 1334 – 27 October 1360	County of Frankenstein	Unmarried	27 October 1360 aged 69–70?	After her death, the county went to her descendants, the Von Stein zu Ostheim family.
In 1360 Frankenstein was added to the patrimony of the Von Stein zu Ostheim family
Henry VI the Younger	1288; First son of Berthold V and Adelaide of Hesse	13 April 1340 – 1 September 1347	County of Coburg	Judith of Brandenburg-Salzwedel; 1 January 1317 or 1 February 1319 five children	10 September 1347 aged 58-59	Children of Berthold V, divided their inheritance. Henry ruled in Coburg via the inheritance of his wife.
John I	1289; Second son of Berthold V and Adelaide of Hesse	13 April 1340 – 2 May 1359	County of Schleusingen	Elisabeth of Leuchtenberg; 1349 four children	2 May 1359 aged 69-70	Children of Berthold V, divided their inheritance. Henry ruled in Coburg via the inheritance of his wife.
Elisabeth	1319; First daughter of Henry VI and Judith of Brandenburg-Salzwedel	1 September 1347 – 30 March 1389	County of Coburg (at Irmelshausen)	Eberhard II, Count of Württemberg; 1340 two children	30 March 1389 aged 69-70	Children of Henry VI, divided their inheritance. In 1360, Sophia sold Schmalkalden to her uncle, John II. All the rest of the inheritances passed to the heiresses' descendants.
Catherine	c.1334 Schleusingen; Second daughter of Henry VI and Judith of Brandenburg-Salzwedel	1 September 1347 – 15 July 1397	County of Coburg	Frederick III, Margrave of Meissen; 1346 four children	15 July 1397; Meissen aged 62-63	Children of Henry VI, divided their inheritance. In 1360, Sophia sold Schmalkalden to her uncle, John II. All the rest of the inheritances passed to the heiresses' descendants.
Sophia	c.1335 Fourth daughter of Henry VI and Judith of Brandenburg-Salzwedel	1 September 1347 – 5 May 1372	County of Coburg (at Schmalkalden and Hildburghausen)	Albert, Burgrave of Nuremberg; 1348 two children	5 May 1372 aged 36-37	Children of Henry VI, divided their inheritance. In 1360, Sophia sold Schmalkalden to her uncle, John II. All the rest of the inheritances passed to the heiresses' descendants.
Irmelshausen annexed to Wurttemberg; Coburg annexed to the House of Wettin; Schmalkalden sold to Schleusingen; Hildburghausen annexed to Nuremberg
Berthold VII	c. 1320; Son of Poppo IX and Richeza of Hohenlohe-Weikersheim	30 July 1349 – 1371	County of Hartenberg	Unmarried	26 May 1378 aged 57-58	Children of Poppo IX, divided their inheritance. Berthold left no heirs, and sold his part to the County of Aschach.
Richeza	c. 1320; Daughter of Poppo IX and Richeza of Hohenlohe-Weikersheim	30 July 1349 – 1379	County of Hartenberg (at Osterburg Castle)	Henry II, Count of Weimar-Orlamunde; 1357 one child John II, Count of Schwarzburg-Wachsenburg; 16 July 1358 seven children	1379 aged 58-59	Children of Poppo IX, divided their inheritance. Berthold left no heirs, and sold his part to the County of Aschach.
In 1371 Hartenberg was sold to Aschach; Osterburg was inherited by Schwarzburg
Herman IV	c.1330 Son of Henry V and Sophia of Käfernburg	1355/6 – 1390	County of Aschach	Adelaide of Zollern no children Agnes of Schwarzburg-Blankenburg; 1366 four children	27 January/28 March 1403 aged 72-73	Sold Aschach in 1390. His seat returned to the previously annexed Hartenberg.
Herman IV	c.1330 Son of Henry V and Sophia of Käfernburg	1390 – c. March 1403	County of Hartenberg	Adelaide of Zollern no children Agnes of Schwarzburg-Blankenburg; 1366 four children	27 January/28 March 1403 aged 72-73	Sold Aschach in 1390. His seat returned to the previously annexed Hartenberg.
Regency of Elisabeth of Leuchtenberg (1359-1361); Regency of Ulrich II, Landgrave of Leuchtenberg and John I, Landgrave of Leuchtenberg (1361-1367)						Children of John I, ruled jointly. Berthold was canon at Bamberg and resigned his noble titles in 1375.
Henry VII	19 June 1352; First son of John I and Elisabeth of Leuchtenberg	2 May 1359 – 26 December 1405	County of Schleusingen	Matilda of Baden c.4 July 1376 six children	26 December 1405; Meiningen aged 53	Children of John I, ruled jointly. Berthold was canon at Bamberg and resigned his noble titles in 1375.
Berthold VIII	1356; Second son of John I and Elisabeth of Leuchtenberg	2 May 1359 – 1375	County of Schleusingen	Unmarried	11 February 1416 aged 59-60	Children of John I, ruled jointly. Berthold was canon at Bamberg and resigned his noble titles in 1375.
Frederick I	1367; Son of Herman IV and Agnes of Schwarzburg-Blankenburg	c. March 1403 – 24 September 1422	County of Hartenberg	Elisabeth of Henneberg-Schleusingen c.4 May 1393 four children	24 September 1422 aged 54-55	
William I	31 July 1384; Son of Henry VII and Matilda of Baden	26 December 1405 – 7 July 1426	County of Schleusingen	Anna of Brunswick-Lüneburg c.30 May 1413 nine children	7 July 1426; Cyprus aged 41	
George	1395; Son of Frederick I and Elisabeth of Henneberg-Schleusingen	24 September 1422 – 25 July 1465	County of Hartenberg	Katharina of Wertheim no children Johannetta of Nassau-Saarbrücken; 13 May 1423; Worms twelve children	25 July 1465 aged 69-70	
Regency of Anna of Brunswick-Lüneburg (1426-1429)						
William II	14 March 1415; First son of William I and Anna of Brunswick-Lüneburg	7 July 1426 – 8 January 1444	County of Schleusingen	Katharina of Hanau; 28 February 1433 seven children	8 January 1444 aged 28	
Henry VIII	17 March 1422; Second son of William I and Anna of Brunswick-Lüneburg	8 January 1444 – 10 September 1475	County of Schleusingen (at Kaltennordheim)	Unmarried	10 September 1475; Kaltennordheim aged 53	After his brother's death, he abandoned clergy and asserted his claim to the region of Kaltennordheim. After his death, the region returned to Schleusingen.
Regency of Katharina of Hanau (1444-1448)						Children of William II, divided their inheritance between them, and also, by force, with their uncle, Henry the Restless. Already part of the clergy, John eventually resigned his portion of the inheritance at Osterburg in 1473.
William III	12 March 1434; First son of William II and Katharina of Hanau	8 January 1444 – 25 May 1480	County of Schleusingen	Margaret of Brunswick-Wolfenbüttel; 5 November 1469; Wolfenbüttel eight children	25 May 1480; Salorno aged 46	Children of William II, divided their inheritance between them, and also, by force, with their uncle, Henry the Restless. Already part of the clergy, John eventually resigned his portion of the inheritance at Osterburg in 1473.
John II	2 July 1439; Second son of William II and Katharina of Hanau	8 January 1444 – 1473	County of Schleusingen (at Osterburg Castle)	Unmarried	20/26 May 1513; Fulda aged 72	Children of William II, divided their inheritance between them, and also, by force, with their uncle, Henry the Restless. Already part of the clergy, John eventually resigned his portion of the inheritance at Osterburg in 1473.
Frederick II	1429; First son of George and Johannetta of Nassau-Saarbrücken	25 July 1465 – 7 November 1488	County of Hartenberg	Elisabeth of Württemberg I 13 September 1469; Münnerstadt twelve children	7 November 1488 aged 58-59	Children of George, ruled jointly.
Otto III	1437; Fifth son of George and Johannetta of Nassau-Saarbrücken	25 July 1465 – 9 June 1502	County of Hartenberg	Unmarried	9 June 1502 aged 64-65	Children of George, ruled jointly.
1st Regency of Margaret of Brunswick-Wolfenbüttel (1480–1484)						
Wolfgang	14/17 March 1479; First son of William III and Margaret of Brunswick-Wolfenbüttel	25 May 1480 – 27 December 1484	County of Schleusingen	Unmarried	27 December 1484 aged 5	
2nd Regency of Margaret of Brunswick-Wolfenbüttel (1484–1495)						
William IV	29 January 1478; Third son of William III and Margaret of Brunswick-Wolfenbüttel	27 December 1484 – 24 January 1559	County of Schleusingen	Anastasia of Brandenburg; 7 or 16 February 1500; Neustadt an der Aisch eleven children	24 January 1559 aged 80	
Herman V	1470; Son of Frederick II and Elisabeth of Württemberg I	9 June 1502 – 5 April 1535	County of Hartenberg	Elisabeth of Brandenburg; 23 October 1491; Aschaffenburg nine children	5 April 1535; Schwarza aged 64-65	
Berthold IX	1493; First son of Herman V and Elisabeth of Brandenburg	5 April 1535 – 1548	County of Römhild	Anna of Outer Mansfeld; 17 August 1529 no children	23 March 1549; Römhild aged 55-56	Children of Herman V, divided the county. Berthold sold his portion to the County of Mansfeld.
Albert	1495; Second son of Herman V and Elisabeth of Brandenburg	5 April 1535 – 5 June 1549	County of Schwarza	Catherine of Stolberg; 1537 no children	5 June 1549; Schwarza aged 53-54	Children of Herman V, divided the county. Berthold sold his portion to the County of Mansfeld.
In 1549 Römhild was sold to the County of Mansfeld, and in 1555 it was sold again to the Electorate of Saxony
Catherine of Stolberg	6 November 1511; Stolberg; Daughter of Bodo III, Count of Stolberg-Wernigerode and Anna of Eppstein-Königstein	5 June 1549 – 18 June 1577	County of Schwarza	Albert; 1537 no children	18 June 1577; Schwarza aged 65	Widow of Albert, inherited his portion of Henneberg and left it, in her will, to her own family.
In 1577 Schwarza was annexed to the County of Stolberg
George Ernest	27 May 1511; Schleusingen; First son of William IV and Anastasia of Brandenburg	24 January 1559 – 27 December 1583	County of Schleusingen	Elisabeth of Brunswick-Calenberg; 19 August 1543; Münden one child Elisabeth of Württemberg II; 31 May 1568; Stuttgart no children	27 December 1583; Henneberg aged 72	Sons of William IV, co-ruled, and neither of them left descendants. After their death, the county was divided between the Electorate of Hesse and the Electorate of Saxony.
Poppo X	20 September 1513; Second son of William IV and Anastasia of Brandenburg	24 January 1559 – 4 March 1574	County of Schleusingen	Elisabeth of Brandenburg; 30 May 1546; Münden no children Sophia of Brunswick-Lüneburg; 22 June 1562; Schleusingen no children	4 March 1574; Schleusingen aged 60	Sons of William IV, co-ruled, and neither of them left descendants. After their death, the county was divided between the Electorate of Hesse and the Electorate of Saxony.
In 1583 Schleusingen was divided between the Electorate of Hesse and the Electorate of Saxony

== Notable members of the Henneberg family ==
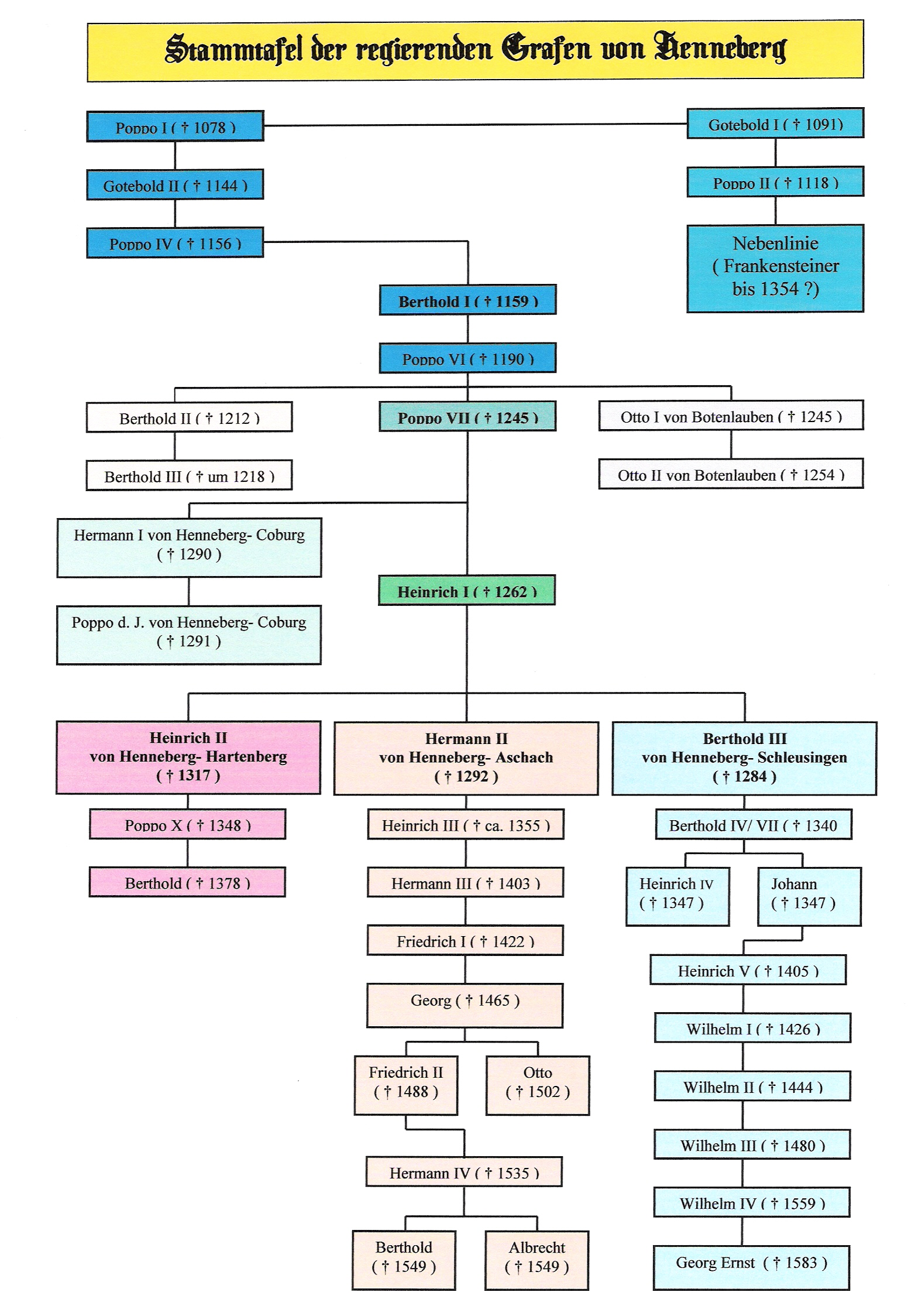
Family tree (click to enlarge)

- Bertold von Henneberg-Römhild (1442 – December 21, 1504), Prince-elector and archbishop of Mainz, son of George, count of Henneberg-Römhild.
- Count Otto von Henneberg, known commonly as Otto von Botenlauben from 1206, probably born in 1177 in Henneberg, died in Reiterswiesen near Bad Kissingen before 1245, was a German minnesinger, crusader and founder of Frauenroth Abbey.
- Herman I, Count of Henneberg
- Catherine of Henneberg
- William II, Princely count of Henneberg-Schleusingen
- William III, Princely count of Henneberg-Schleusingen
- William IV, Princely count of Henneberg-Schleusingen

== Castles ==
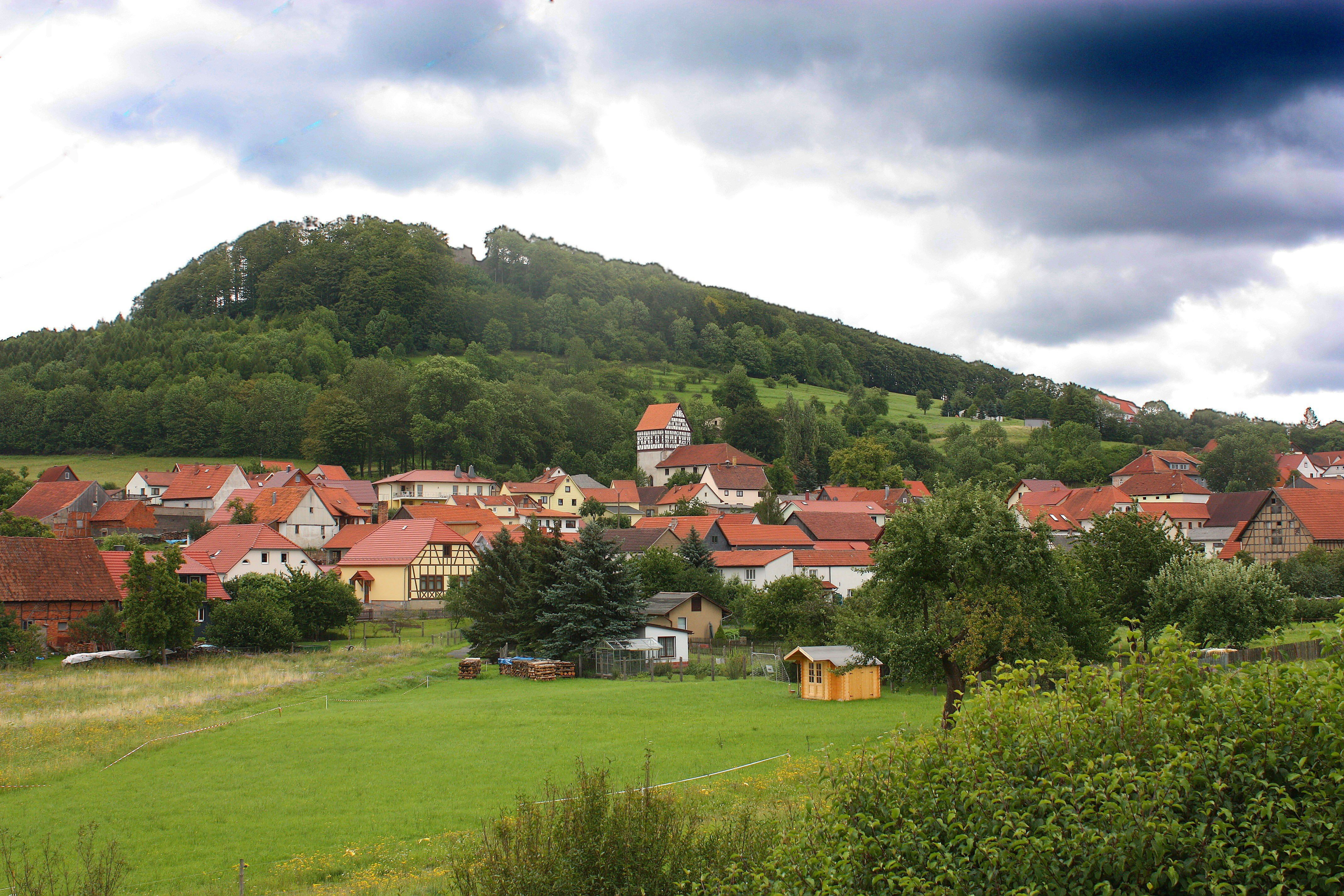
Henneberg, Thuringia

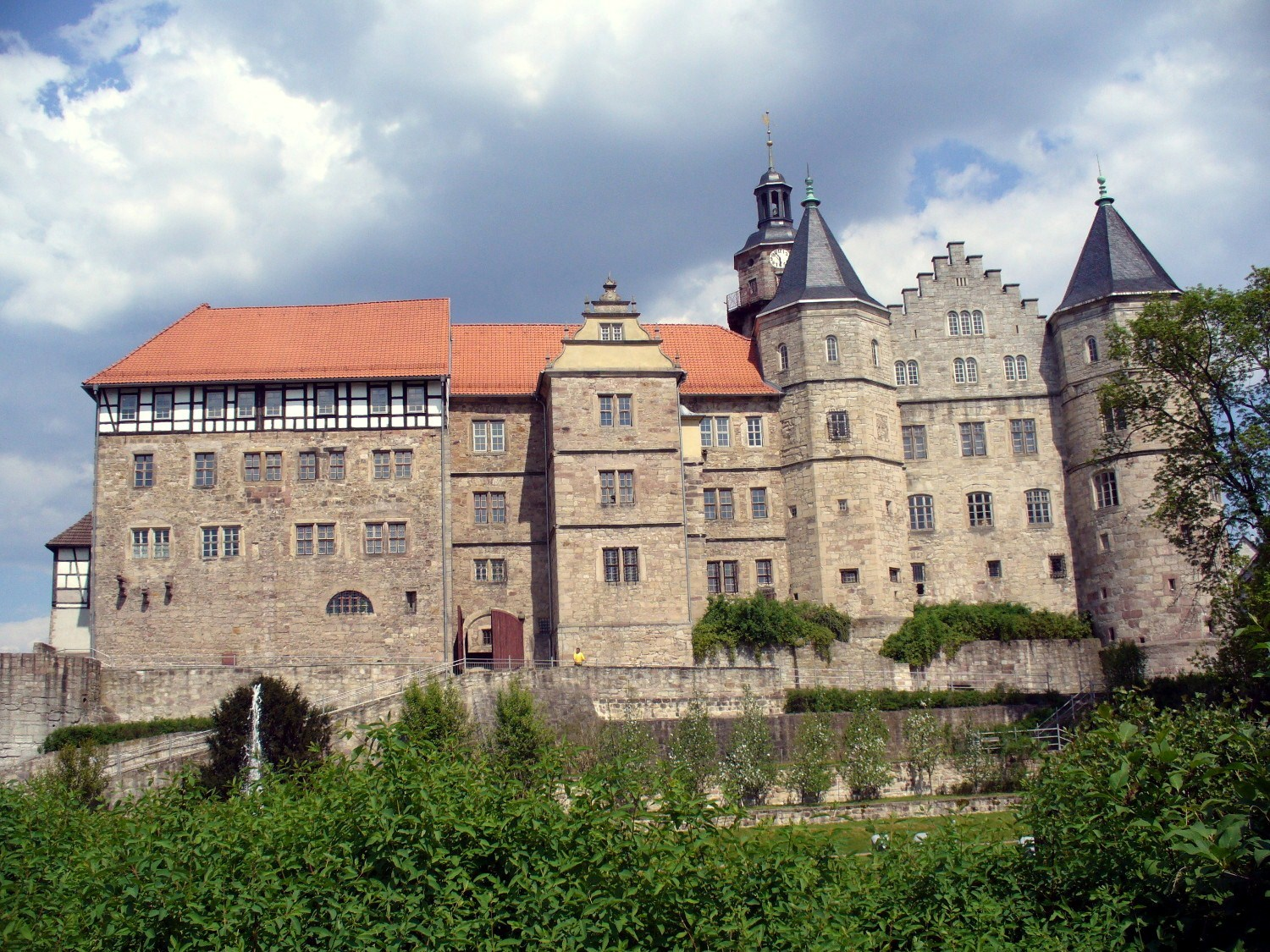
Bertholdsburg Castle, Schleusingen

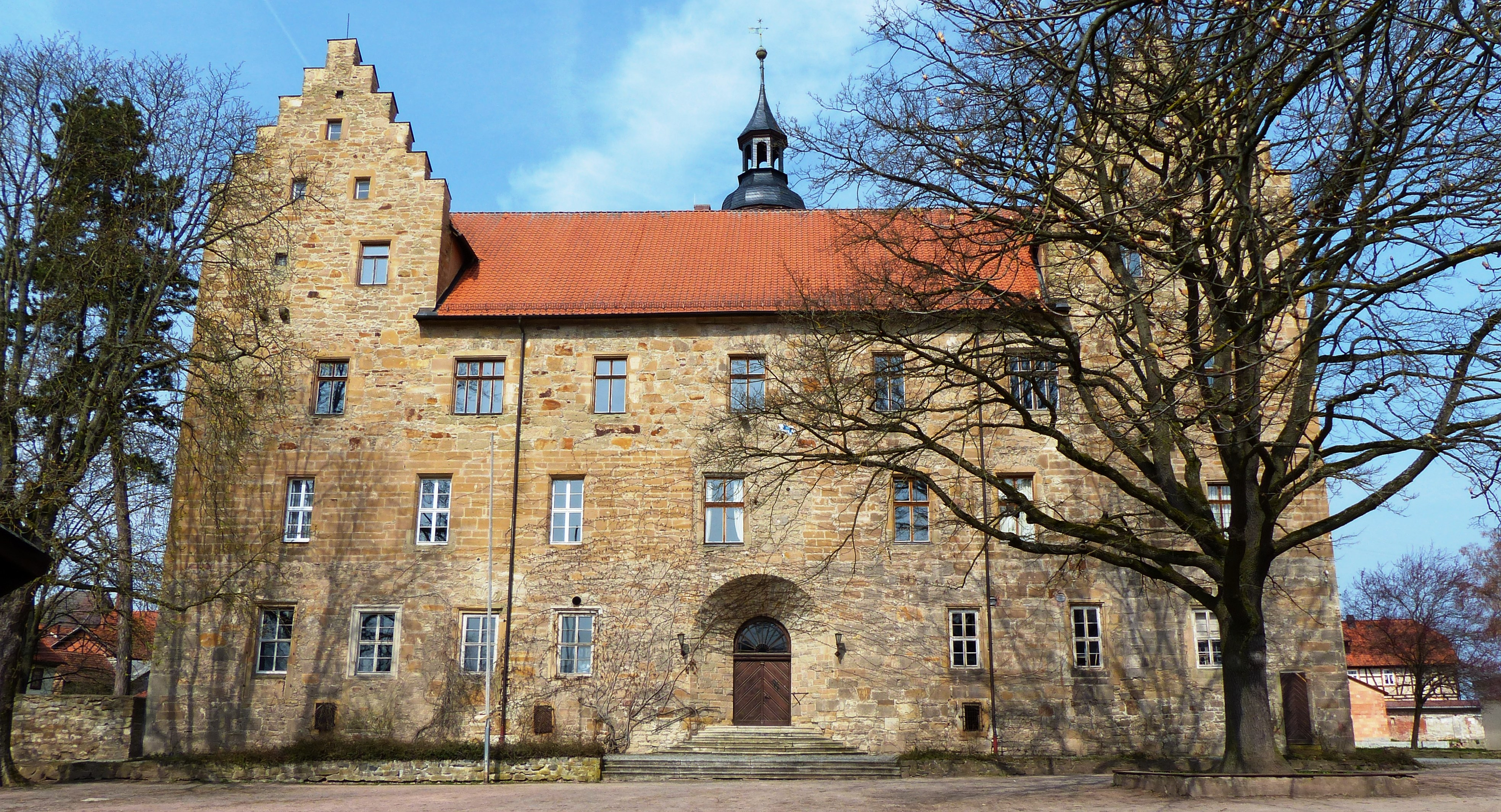
Römhild Castle

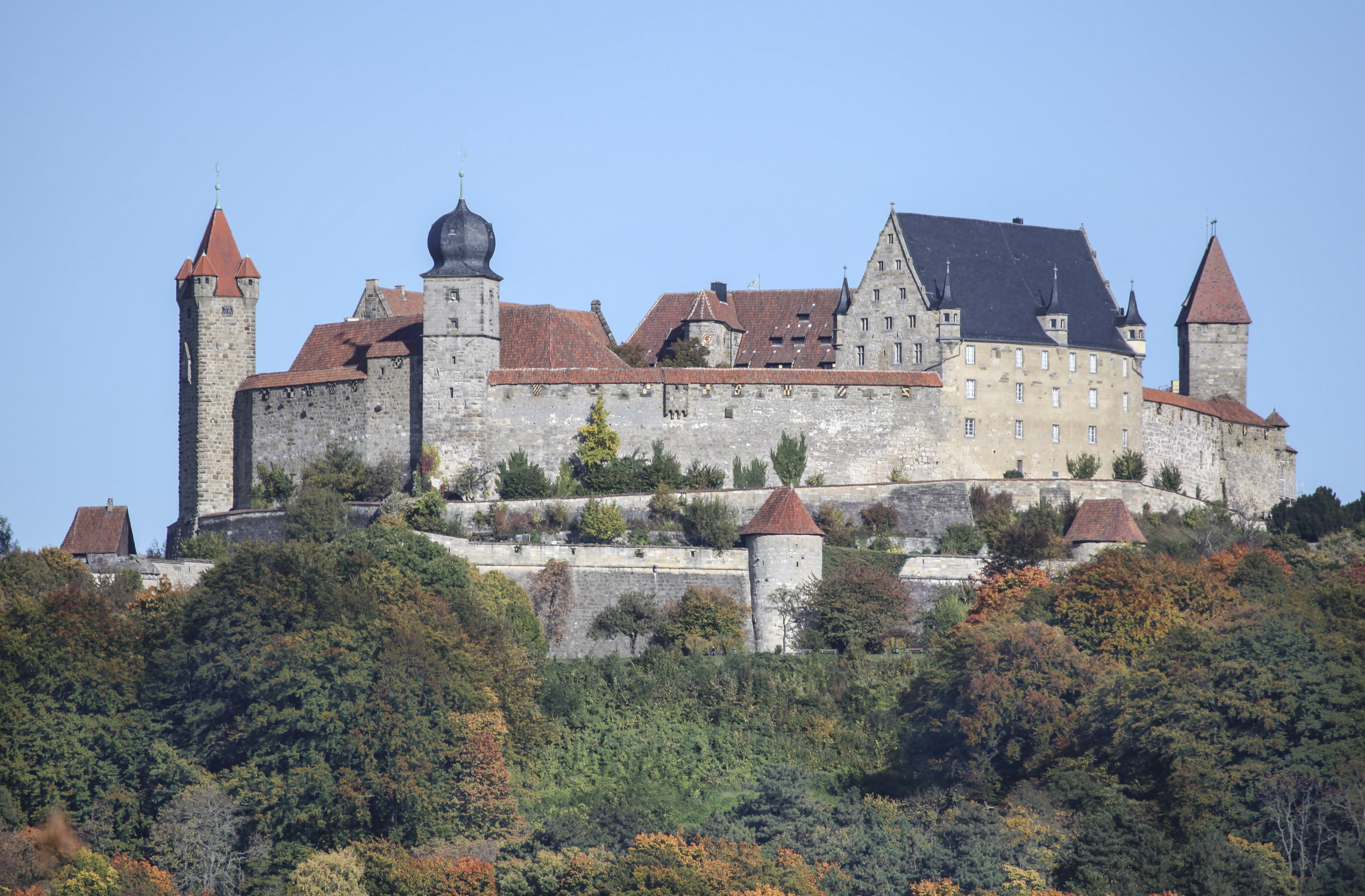
Coburg Castle

== Coat of arms ==
=== Coat of arms of the Henneberg ===
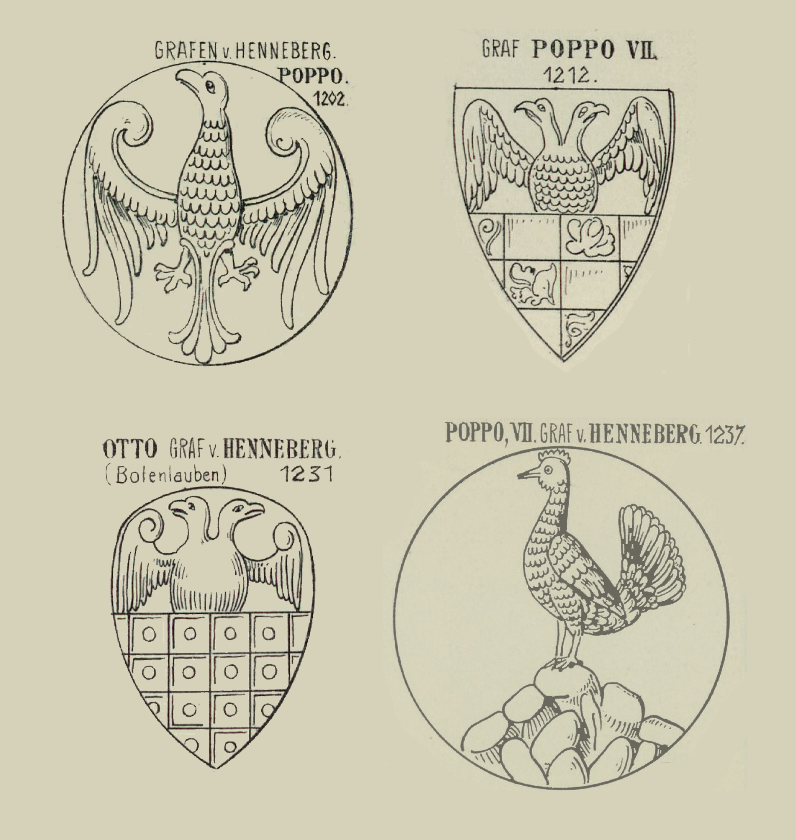
Evolution of the seals of the coat of arms of the Counts of Henneberg, 1202-1237

The original arms of the Counts of Henneberg was a plain eagle. It was shown on the seal of Count Poppo VI in 1185 and his sons Berthold II and Poppo VII in 1202. The latter also used another coat of arms, first appearing around 1212, displaying a shield Parted per fess, above a double-headed eagle wings displayed and expanded, below chequy in three horizontal rows. The addition of the chequy may refer to the walls of Castle Botenlauben. A later depiction of the same arms, in the Weingarten Manuscript, depicting Count Otto of Bottenloube, adds the tinctures; Parted per fess, above Or a double-headed eagle sable displayed and expanded, below chequy in gules and silver in five horizontal rows. This coat of arms continued to be used until at least 1280.

A new coat of arms seems to have been introduced by Poppo VII and first appears in 1237, and depicts the more familiar arms of a Hen standing on a mountain, where the hen and the mountain (Berg) are canting arms for the name Henneberg.

=== Coats of arms incorporating Henneberg ===
Wartburgkreis

Landkreis Hildburghausen

Ilm-Kreis

Schmalkalden-Meiningen

Suhl

Schleusingen

Meiningen

Themar

Schmalkalden

== See also ==
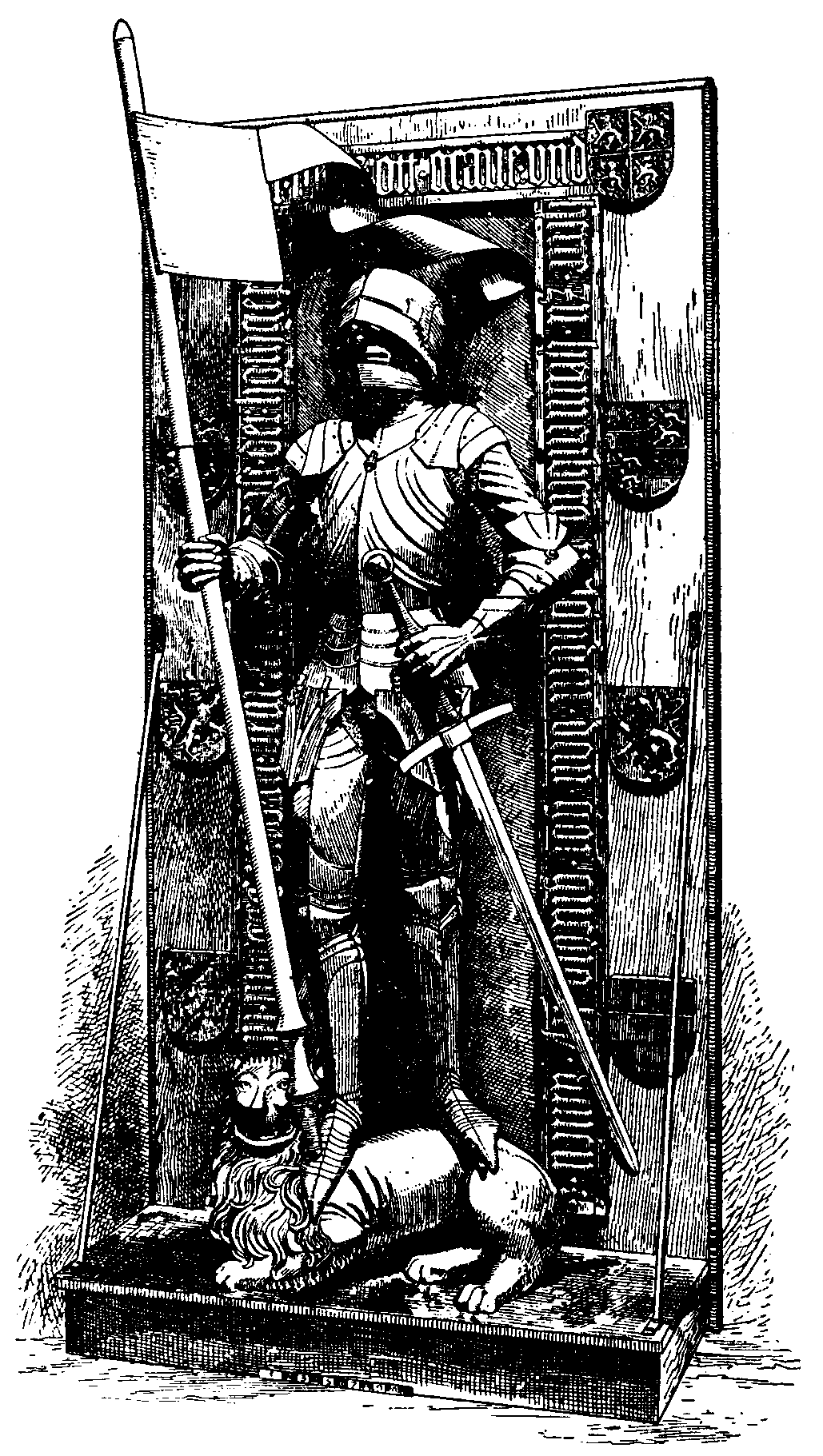
Monument of Count Otto IV of Henneberg-Münnerstadt +1502

- Bishopric of Würzburg
- Vessra Abbey
- Aura Abbey
- Römhild
- Sondheim vor der Rhön
- Münnerstadt
- Irmelshausen
- Bad Kissingen (district)
- Poppo
- William II, German Emperor/Scraps
- Schmalkalden-Meiningen
- Wartburgkreis
- Hildburghausen (district)
- List of states in the Holy Roman Empire (H)
