= Ulrich of Hanau =

Ulrich of Hanau may refer to:

- Ulrich I, Lord of Hanau (c. 1255/1260 – 1305/1306), ruling Lord of Hanau from 1281 until his death
- Ulrich II, Lord of Hanau (c. 1280/1288 – 1346), Lord of Hanau from 1305/1306 until his death
- Ulrich III, Lord of Hanau (c. 1310 – 1369 or 1370), Lord of Hanau from 1346 until his death and governor in the Wetterau
- Ulrich IV, Lord of Hanau (1330/1340 – 1380), Lord of Hanau from 1369/1370 until his death
- Ulrich V, Lord of Hanau (c. 1370 – 1419), ruling Lord of Hanau from 1380 to 1404
