= Ulrich IV of Hanau =

Ulrich IV, Lord of Hanau
- Born: Between 1330 and 1340
- Died: September or October 1380
- Buried: Arnsburg Abbey
- Noble family: House of Hanau
- Spouse: Elizabeth of Wertheim
- Father: Ulrich III, Lord of Hanau
- Mother: Adelaide of Nassau

Ulrich IV, Lord of Hanau (1330/40–1380) was Lord of Hanau from 1369 or 1370 until his death. Based on the estimated year his parents married, he is assumed to have been born between 1330 and 1340. He was the son of Ulrich III of Hanau and Adelaide of Nassau.

== Reign ==
Ulrich IV succeeded his father when he died in late 1369 or early 1370. The exact date of Ulrich III's death has not been recorded.

=== Imperial policies ===
On 20 March 1371, Duke Wenceslas of Bohemia, acting as the representative of his father, Emperor Charles IV, appointed Ulrich IV as governor of the Wetterau, a position his father had held before him. However, he must have been relieved of his duties later that year, as we find Archbishop John of Mainz on this post in the fall of 1371. Perhaps Charles IV never confirmed Ulrich IV's appointment.

During his reign, he was involved in various feuds and regional wars. He was a member of the Star League, a group of territorial lords trying to counter the growing influence of the Landgraviate of Hesse. Possibly in the context of the War of the Start League, Ulrich IV killed Frowin of Hutten, an ally of Hesse, in Steinau an der Straße. Details of how this happened, are unknown. Relatives of Frowin, led by his brother Conrad, pursued Ulrich and took him prisoner. Ulrich's uncle, Bishop Adolph of Speyer mediated and Ulrich was released, in exchange for a ransom of 7500 guilder. Ulrich also had to donate a sanctuary lamp to the monastery at Schlüchtern, provide for a requiem and 50 guilders for the maintenance of the altar, and 100 guilders for a conciliation cross at the house where the crime had been committed. Finally, he had to make some political concessions, designed to prevent him from continuing to fight on the side of the Star League.

Even during the War of the Star League, Ulrich IV continued his father's pacification policies.

=== Territorial acquisitions ===
By his marriage to Elizabeth of Wertheim, Ulrich IV acquired a quarter of Breuberg Castle and the associated Lordship. The Counts of Wertheim bought this share back in 1409.

In 1371, Ulrich purchased Steinheim, situated on the Main opposite Hanau, from the Lords of Eppstein, as well as the remaining shares in Alzenau. However, in 1377, he sold half of Steinheim to his brother-in-law, Count William II of Katzenelnbogen. From 1378 to 1389, he and his successor held castle and city of Königstein and other rights and sources of income, as security for a loan he and the City of Frankfurt had extended to the Lords of Falkenstein-Münzenberg.

In 1372, he sold Babenhausen for 4000 guilders to the Bohemian Crown. The King of Bohemia immediately gave it back to him as a fief. The background of this transaction was that the King, as Elector wanted to secure a route from his residence to Frankfurt, because the Golden Bull of 1356 stipulated that all future Imperial elections were to take place in Frankfurt. Babenhausen is about a day's travel east of Frankfurt, making a very suitable "stepping stone" on the route to the site of the election. In 1374, the Fulda monastery pledged Otzberg Fortress, the city of Hering and its share of Umstadt to Ulrich IV. In 1390, the monastery sold these territories to Elector Palatine Rupert II, so that he became Hanau's debtor. In 1377, Ulrich acquired the second half of Schlüchtern, by swapping it with Bishop Gerard of Würzburg for Bütthard castle and the district of Altenhaßlau as a fief.

=== Domestic policies ===
In 1375 Ulrich IV confirmed and extended the primogeniture decree his grandfather Ulrich II had issued in 1339. He gave it its final form, that would be mostly, but not always, adhered to in the County of Hanau for the coming centuries.

== Death ==
Ulrich IV died in September or October 1380. He was buried — like all his predecessors — in Arnsburg Abbey. He was the last of the Lords of Hanau to be buried there.

== Marriage and issue ==
In 1366 or 1367 he married Elizabeth, the daughter of Eberhard of Wertheim. They were engaged on 11 February 1366; the wedding agreement was signed on 15 February 1366; on 12 March 1367 she is first mentioned as Ulirch IV's wife in a document. From this marriage four children are known:

1. Ulrich V ruled Hanau from 1380 to 1404
2. Reinhard II, ruled from 1404 to 1451
3. John, co-ruler from 1404 to 1411
4. Conrad (before 1388 – after 1419), cleric

== Ancestors ==
Ancestors of Ulrich IV of Hanau

8. Ulrich I, Lord of Hanau (1250/60 – 1305/06)
4. Ulrich II, Lord of Hanau (1280-1346)
9. Elisabeth of Rieneck-Rotenfels (c. 1260 – c. 1300)
2. Ulrich III, Lord of Hanau (1310-1369/70)
10. Kraft I of Hohenlohe-Weikersheim (before 1260 – 1312)
5. Agnes of Hohenlohe-Weikersheim (before 1295 – 1342/44)
11. probably Margaret of Truhendingen-Dillingen
1. Ulrich IV, Lord of Hanau
12. Adolf, King of Germany (c. 1255 – 1298)
6. Gerlach I, Count of Nassau (before 1288 – 7 January 1361)
13. Imagina of Isenburg-Limburg (c. 1255 – 1313)
3. Adelaide of Nassau (d. 1344)
14. Landgrave Henry the Younger of Hesse (c. 1264 – c. 1298)
7. Agnes of Hesse (d. 1322)
15. Agnes of Bavaria (1276-1345)

== Footnotes ==
Ulrich IV of Hanau House of Hanau Born: Between 1330 and 1340 Died: September or October 1380
Preceded by Ulrich III	Lord of Hanau; 1369/70 – 1380	Succeeded by Ulrich V
