= Ulrich III =

Ulrich III may refer to:

- Ulrich III, Duke of Carinthia (c. 1220 – 1269)
- Ulrich III, Count of Württemberg (after 1286 – 1344)
- Ulrich III, Lord of Hanau (c. 1310 – c. 1370)
- Ulrich III of Mecklenburg-Güstrow (1527–1603)
