= Ulrich V, Lord of Hanau =

- Born: c. 1370
- Died: 1419 probably Schaafheim
- Noble family: House of Hanau
- Spouse: Elisabeth of Ziegenhain
- Father: Ulrich IV, Lord of Hanau
- Mother: Elisabeth of Wertheim

Ulrich V, Lord of Hanau (c. 1370–1419 in Schaafheim) was the ruling Lord of Hanau from 1380 to 1404.

== Childhood ==
His exact date and even the year of his birth were not recorded, because in the medieval view the date the death of a person was far more important, as that was the date a memorial mass would be read. Nevertheless, the exact date of his death was not recorded either, because his family was silent about him after he was deposed.

He was born around 1370, as the eldest son of Ulrich IV and his wife, Elisabeth of Wertheim. He inherited Hanau already in 1380.

One of the sons of Ulrich IV was enrolled at the University of Heidelberg in 1390. The enrollment entry does not mention a first name — it only names a domicellus de Hanaw. Since Ulrich V was already ruling Hanau at this time, it would be unlikely that he was this student.

== Regency ==
Since he was a minor when he inherited Hanau in 1380, a regency was set up. The father of his fiancée, Count Gottfried VIII of Ziegenhain acted as regent until c. 1388.

== Reign ==
In 1389, he fought on the side of Elector Palatine Rupert I in the Cities War, a conflict between the emerging cities and the nobility, and on the victorious side in the Feud of Kronberg. In 1400, he was among the Burgmanns of Friedberg who were sent to the newly elected King Rupert of the Romans, to negotiate about the homage, after King Wenceslaus had been deposed.

== Government crisis and deposition ==
There were two main reasons why Ulrich V was deposed by his relatives:

- The absence of a male heir threatened the survival of the family. In 1375, his father had confirmed the primogeniture decree, which Ulrich II had issued in 1339. The threat was reduced by family treaty of 1391, which allowed his brother Reinhard II to marry if Ulrich V still had no male heir ten years later, that is, in 1401.
- Ulrich V ran into economic difficulties from 1394, and even more so after 1396, even though he had received compensation payments from the city of Frankfurt after the Feud of Kronberg. Apparently, he had overstretched himself in his "foreign policy". He mortgaged the village of Hochstadt to Frankfurt, the district of Joßgrund to the Lords of Thüngen, and in the end, he even mortgaged the two major of the four cities in his territory, Hanau and Babenhausen to his neighbor, political rival and first cousin once removed, Archbishop John II of Mainz, effectively making him co-ruler of the Lordship of Hanau.

From c. 1395, a coalition consisting of Reinhard II and his younger brother, John began acting independently and even against Ulrich V. This led to an open dispute, which was settled by a compromise in 1398. However, the dispute emerged again, and grew to the level of a feud. From 1400, and more so from 1402, Reinhard II and John sought support from Archbishop John II of Mainz, who eventually changed sides and dropped his support of Ulrich V.

In 1404, Ulrich V gradually lost power. On 20 February 1404, Reinhard II and John took up government; on 20 November 1404, Ulrich formally abdicated and ordered his subjects to pay homage to his brothers. His wife had already renounced any claims she might have on Hanau earlier that year, in return for a monetary compensation, without Ulrich V being even mentioned in the contract.

Historians in the 18th and 19th century have suggested that Ulrich V may have suffered from a mental disorder. This disorder would have justified setting aside the primogeniture decree for just one generation. However, there is no contemporary evidence to support this theory.

Reinhard II and John ruled jointly at first. After John died in 1411, Reinhard II ruled alone.

== Death ==
Little is known about Ulrich V after his abdication. He is reported to have resided in Frankfurt for a while, and later in the district of Babenhausen. He probably died in 1419 in Schaafheim.

== Marriage and issue ==
In 1394, Ulrich V married Elisabeth (c. 1375 – 1 December 1431), the daughter of Count Gottfried VIII of Ziegenhain. They had three daughters:

1. Elisabeth (d. 1475), married in 1413 to Albert I of Hohenlohe (d. 15 June 1429)
2. Agnes (d. 22 November 1446), abbess of Klarenthal Abbey
3. Adelaide (d. 13 November 1440), a nun at Klarenthal Abbey

== Ancestors ==
Ancestors of Ulrich V, Lord of Hanau

8. Ulrich II, Lord of Hanau (1280-1346)
4. Ulrich III, Lord of Hanau (c. 1310-1369/70)
9. Agnes of Hohenlohe (before 1295 – 1343)
2. Ulrich IV, Lord of Hanau (1330/40-1380)
10. Gerlach I, Count of Nassau (1283-1361)
5. Adelheid of Nassau (d. 1344)
11. Agnes of Hesse (d. 1371)
1. Ulrich V, Count of Hanau
12. Rudolph III of Wertheim (1302-1355)
6. Eberhard I of Wertheim (d. 1373)
13. Elizabeth of Breuberg (d. 1358)
3. Elizabeth of Wertheim (1347-1378)
14. Frederick IV, Burgrave of Nuremberg (1287-1332)
7. Catherine of Hohenzollern (died: after 1369)
15. Margaret of Carinthia (died: after 1348)

== Footnotes ==
Ulrich V, Lord of Hanau House of Hanau Born: c. 1370 Died: 1419
Preceded by Ulrich IV	Lord of Hanau; 1380-1404	Succeeded by Reinhard II as Count of Hanau
