= Hirzenhain =

Municipality in Hesse, Germany

- Municipality
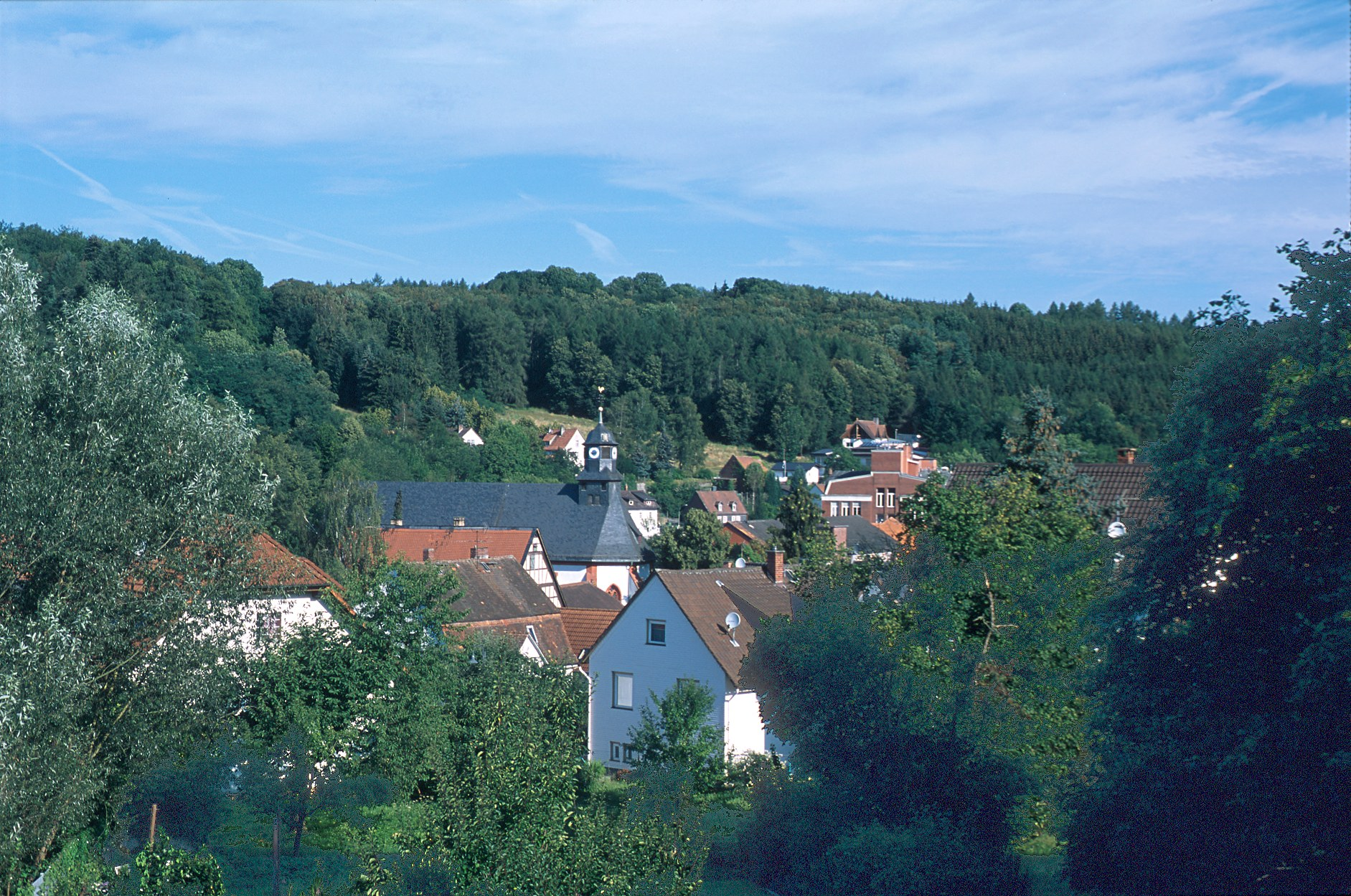
- Hirzenhain in 2009

- Coat of arms

- Location of Hirzenhain within Wetteraukreis district
- Interactive map of Hirzenhain
- Location within Germany Location within Hesse
- Coordinates: 50°23′25″N 9°8′10″E
- Country: Germany
- State: Hesse
- Admin. region: Darmstadt
- District: Wetteraukreis
- Subdivisions: 3 districts

Government
  - Mayor (2023–29): Timo Tichai

Area
  - Total: 16.11 km^{2} (6.22 sq mi)
- Elevation: 260 m (850 ft)

Population (2025-12-31)
  - Total: 2,741
  - Density: 170.1/km^{2} (440.7/sq mi)
- Time zone: UTC+01:00 (CET)
  - Summer (DST): UTC+02:00 (CEST)
- Postal codes: 63697
- Dialling codes: 06045
- Vehicle registration: FB
- Website: www.hirzenhain.de

Hirzenhain (German pronunciation: [ˈhɪʁtsn̩ˌhaɪn]) is a municipality in the Wetteraukreis, in Hesse, Germany. It is located approximately 45 kilometers northeast of Frankfurt am Main. It has a population of around 2,800.

== History ==
From 1943 to 1945 the area was the site of a forced labour camp for convicted criminals and prisoners of war, run by the Gestapo. On 25 March 1945, shortly before the end of the war, a troop of SS killed 87 inmates of the camp. There is a memorial to the victims in the municipality. The dead were reinterred at Arnsburg Abbey in 1960.
