= Ulrich III of Hanau =

Ulrich III, Lord of Hanau
- Born: c. 1310
- Died: 1369 or 1370
- Buried: Arnsburg Abbey
- Noble family: House of Hanau
- Father: Ulrich II, Lord of Hanau
- Mother: Agnes of Hohenlohe-Weikersheim

Lord Ulrich III of Hanau (c. 1310 – 1369 or 1370; buried in the Arnsburg Abbey) was Lord of Hanau from 1346 until his death. He was also governor in the Wetterau.

== Background ==
Ulrich III was born around 1310, as the eldest son of Ulrich II of Hanau and his wife, Agnes of Hohenlohe-Weikersheim. The year of his birth is inferred from the facts that his parents married in 1310, and that Ulrich III was considered old enough to marry in 1327.

== Reign ==
Ulrich III was politically active even before his father died in 1346. From 1343, he acted as regent of Falkenstein-Münzenberg, together with Count Kuno of Falkenstein.

In the years 1349 and 1357, two black death epidemics struck Germany. There is no historical account of how badly Hanau was affected. In neighbouring Frankfurt, 2000 people are reported to have died within 200 days. Ulrich III and his relatives were apparently not personally affected, as there are no deaths in his family that can be attributed to these epidemics. There was, however, a pogrom against the Jews in Hanau. They were accused of arson and exiled from the city.

=== Domestic policies ===
Fiscal policy in the Lordship of Hanau was apparently very successful under his reign. Despite his costly military campaigns, and feuds, he possessed more than enough money to grant loans to his allies, to redeem his own mortgages and to purchase mortgages and territories.

In 1368 he obtained town privileges for his villages Bruchköbel and Marköbel from the king. However, this turned out to not have any consequences for their development. The king also granted him the right of minting for the city of Babenhausen.

During his reign, there are an increasing number of conflicts between the territorial rulers in the area and the city of Frankfurt, as more and more people migrate from the rural areas to the city, depriving the territorial rulers of subjects and tax revenue.

=== Imperial policies ===
Ulrich III continued the imperial policy of his predecessors. This allowed him to strengthen his right hand around Frankfurt, especially in the district of Bornheimerberg. In 1349, he extended credit to the Emperor and in return received the office of imperial Schultheiß of Frankfurt as a lien. In 1360, he also received the office of imperial Schultheiß of the Frankfurt City Forest as a line securing more credit. The Frankfurt City Forest formed the southern border of the city of Frankfurt. The citizens of Frankfurt felt that Ulrich III was undermining their independence by encircling the site inside and out, since he also held the district of Bornheimerberg, which completely surrounded the city on its northern border, and he held to office of Schultheiß inside the city. There was an ongoing conflict in the City between the aristocrats and the craftsmen; from 1358 Ulrich mediated in this conflict.

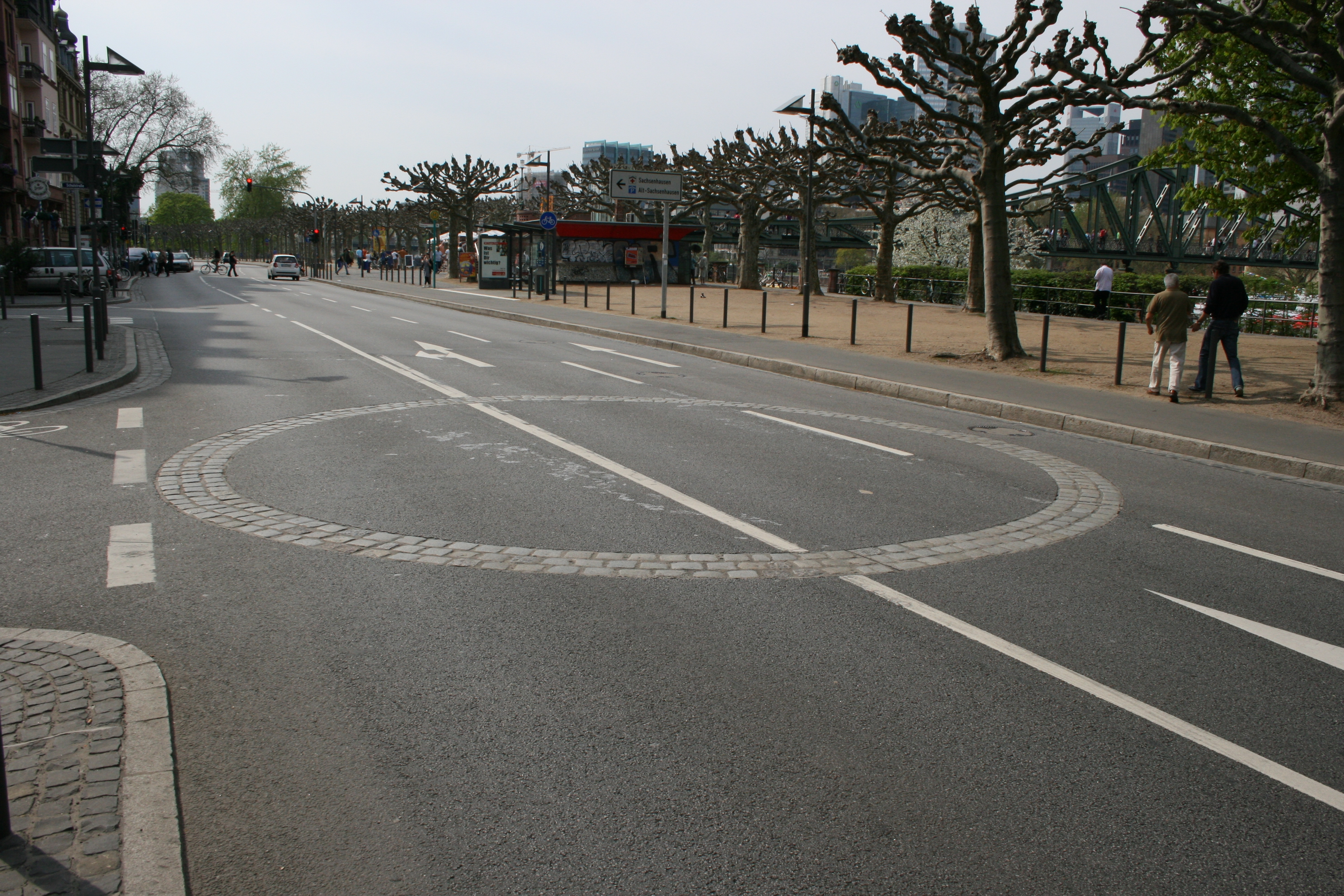
The location of Ulrichstein Tower (formerly part of Frankfurt's city wall) is now marked by a ring of stones in the road surface

Another aspect of this encirclement was the Ulrichstein Tower, a stronghold and customs tower in Sachsenhausen, Frankfurt's bridgehead on the south bank of the Main. There is a theory that it may have been originally built by Lord Ulrich I of Münzenberg (1217–1240). The tower was part of the defensive wall around the city, but it also helped Ulrich to protect his interests. The existence of the tower is first mentioned in an overview of Frankfurt's city gates and towers from 1391.

In order to break Ulrich's encirclement, the aristocrat and later mayor of Frankfurt Siegfried zum Paradies, who had excellent relations with the emperor, redeemed the mortgages and took up the office of Schultheiß himself. The emperor probably preferred politically a wealthy city over a powerful territorial ruler.

In 1354, Ulrich secured control over Schelmenburg Castle, the seat of the Schelme von Bergen family in what is now the Bergen-Enkheim district of Frankfurt. He also acquired shares in the districts of Altenhaßlau and Jossgrund and in the justice over the Ortenberg district. He rounded off the boundaries of Hanau purchasing land and liens. In 1357, he acquired some fiefs from the Fulda monastery and shares in the villages Somborn, Alzenau, Wilmundsheim vor der Hart and Hörstein, all in the shire of Alzenau. He also acquired a one-sixth share of the districts of Münzenberg and Assenheim and a share of Gronau. In 1367, he increased his share in Rodheim, a village held jointly by Hanau and Falkenstein.

He participated in the Diets in Metz and Nuremberg in 1356, during which the Golden Bull was issued. From Emperor Charles IV, he received toll privileges in Steinau an der Straße (on the trade route from Frankfurt to Leipzig), in Sterbfritz (on the route from Fulda to Würzburg) and in Kesselstadt at the bank of the river Main.

In 1363 and 1364, he participated in military actions of the Teutonic Knights in Prussia.

=== Governor in the Wetterau ===
Ulrich III actively participated in regional politics. On 8 June 1349, Emperor Charles IV appointed him governor in the Wetterau. In this position, he repeatedly fought major noblemen in the area in the 1356-1366 period. Among them were Philip of Isenburg-Grenzau, whose Vilmar Castle he took in 1359, and from 1364 to 1366, Philip the Elder of Falkenstein, who was allied with the imperial cities of Frankfurt, Friedberg, Wetzlar and Gelnhausen and Archbishop Kuno of Trier.

=== Coat of arms ===
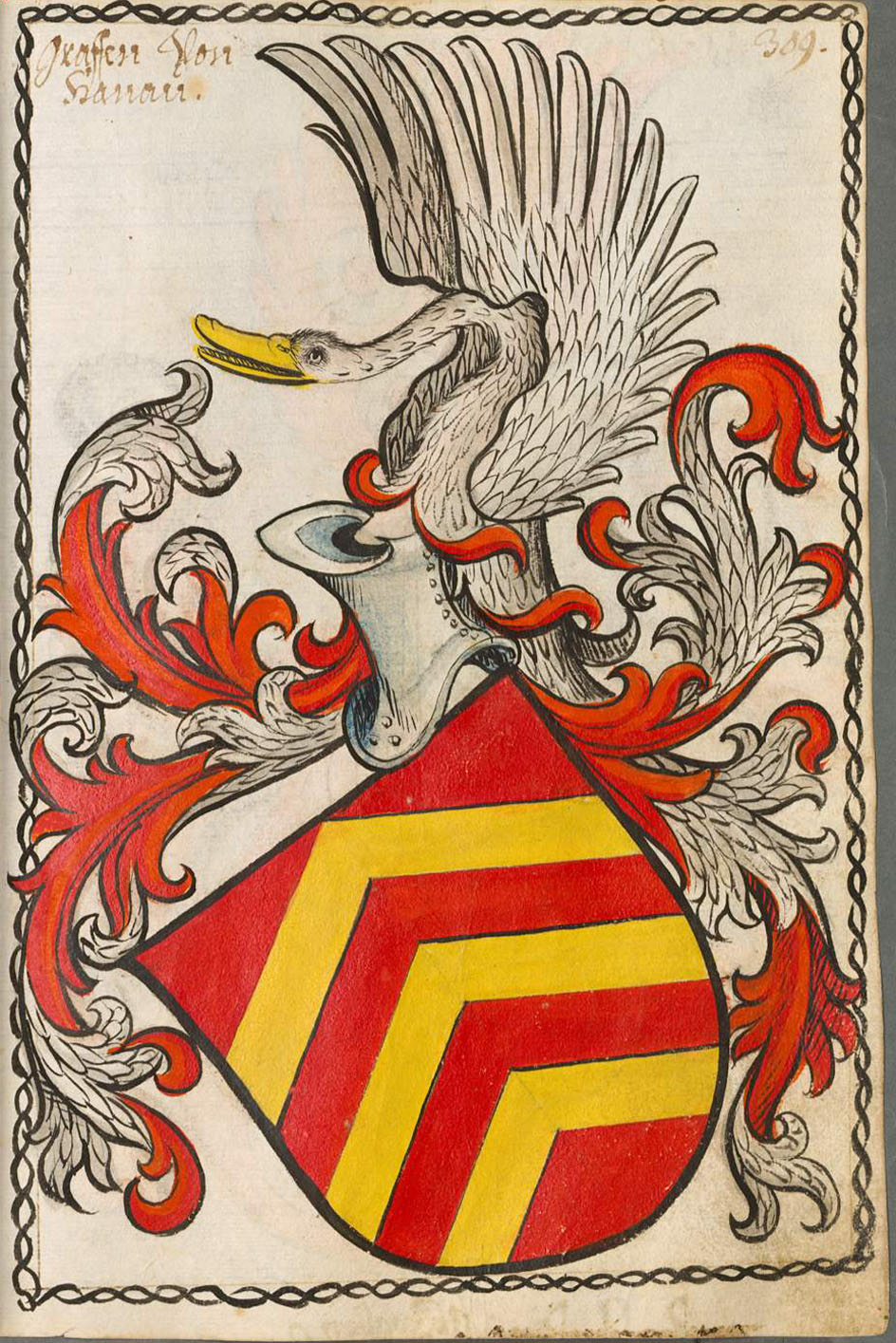
Coat of arms of Hanau

The coat of arms of the Lordship of Hanau reached its final form during Ulrich III's reign. The similarity with the coat of arms of the County of Rieneck and the fact that they used the same crest gave rise to a dispute. The dispute was resolved in 1367 with a compromise: Rieneck would use a standing swan, Hanau would use a growing half swan. The city of Hanau still uses the coat of arms in this form today.

== Marriage and issue ==
Ulrich III married in 1327 or later to Countess Adelaide of Nassau, the daughter of Count Gerlach I of Nassau. She died on 8 August 1344 and was buried in Arnsburg Abbey. Her grave stone has survived. They had at least five children. The order in which the children were born, is not known, although we can infer that Ulrich IV was the eldest son from the fact that he was the heir.

- Ulrich IV (c. 1330 – 1380), his successor
- Reinhard (c. 1330 – early 15th century), a canon at Würzburg and Mainz
- Elisabeth (c. 1330 – after 1384), married William II, Count of Katzenelnbogen
- Agnes, mentioned in 1346 as a nun in Klarenthal Abbey in Wiesbaden.
- Anna, mentioned in 1396 as abbess of Patershausen Abbey

== Ancestors ==
Ancestors of Ulrich III of Hanau

16. Reinhard I, Lord of Hanau (1225 – 1281)
8. Reinhard I, Lord of Hanau (before 1243 – 1281)
4. Ulrich I, Lord of Hanau (1250/60 – 1305/06)
17. Count Ulrich von Münzenberg (1170 – 1240)
9. Adelaide of Hagen-Münzenberg (d. 1291)
18. Adelheid von Dassel (circa 1198 – 1263)
2. Ulrich II, Lord of Hanau (1280 – 1346)
19. Arnold II, Count of Looz (d. 1146)
10. Louis of Rieneck-Rotenfels (d. 1300)
20. Agnes (Deceased)
5. Elisabeth of Rieneck-Rotenfels (c. 1260 – c. 1300)
21. Gerard, Count of Rieneck (d. 1216)
11. Udehilt of Grumbach-Rotenfels (d. 1300)
22. Cunegonde von Zimmern (Deceased)
1. Ulrich III, Lord of Hanau
23. Otto I, Duke of Merania (1180 – 1234)
12. Gottfried of Hohenlohe (before 1219 – after 1266)
24. Beatrice II, Countess of Burgundy (1193 – 1231)
6. Kraft I of Hohenlohe-Weikersheim (before 1260 – 1312)
25. Wolrad I. von Krautheim (d. 1234)
13. Richza of Krautheim (before 1224 – after 1263)
26. Adelheid von Bocksberg (Deceased)
3. Agnes of Hohenlohe-Weikersheim (before 1295 – 1342/1344)
27. Friedrich IV, Count of Truhendingen (1189 – 1290)
14. Frederick of Truhendingen-Dillingen (d. 1274)
28. Otto I, Duke of Merania (1180 – 1234)
7. probably Margaret of Truhendingen-Dillingen
15. probably Margaret of Andechs-Merania (d. 1271)

== Footnotes ==
Ulrich III of Hanau House of Hanau Born: c. 1310 Died: 1369 or 1370
Preceded by Ulrich II	Lord of Hanau; 1346 – 1369 or 1370	Succeeded by Ulrich IV
