= Elisabeth of Hanau, Countess of Hohenlohe =

Elisabeth of Hanau
- Born: c. 1395
- Died: 25 May 1475
- Buried: Gnadental monastery in Michelfeld
- Noble family: House of Hanau
- Spouse: Albert I of Hohenlohe
- Father: Ulrich V, Lord of Hanau
- Mother: Elisabeth of Ziegenhain

Elisabeth of Hanau (c. 1395 – 25 May 1475) was a daughter of Lord Ulrich V and his wife, Countess Elisabeth of Ziegenhain. She died on 25 May 1475 and was buried in the Gnadental monastery in Michelfeld.

== Inheritance of Ziegenhain ==
Through her marriage to Albert I of Hohenlohe strengthened, Elisabeth strengthened the family relations between the House of Hohenlohe and the Counts of Ziegenhain, which had begun when her maternal aunt Agnes of Ziegenhain (d. 1399) had married Count Kraft IV of Hohenlohe-Weikersheim.

John II, the last Count of Ziegenhain, died in 1450 without a male heir. The county of Ziegenhain had been a fief of Hesse since 1437, so Hesse declared that it was a completed fief and occupied the county militarily. The House of Hohenlohe, however, asserted that they were the closest male heir, as their son descended from the Counts of Ziegenhain via Elisabeth. Using this argument, the Hoholohe family convinced Emperor Frederick III to enfeoff them with the County of Ziegenhain as an imperial fief, thereby raising them to the status of imperial counts. This led to a lengthy dispute, which lasted until 1495. In the end, Hesse won and Ziegenhain remained a part of the Landgraviate. Nevertheless, Albert I and his descendants retained the title of count and the status of imperial count and added the six-pointed star of Ziegenhain to their coat of arms.

== Inheritance of Lichtenberg ==
Elisabeth's daughter, also named Elisabeth, married Louis V of Lichtenberg. Their daughter Anna (1442–1474) married Count Philip "the Elder", the first Count of Hanau-Babenhausen. In 1480, James of Lichtenberg, the last Lord of Lichtenberg, died without a male heir. His inheritance was divided between Philip the Elder and Count Simon Wecker of Zweibrücken-Bitsch, who was married to Anna's sister, who was also named Elisabeth. This inheritance brought Hanau-Babenhausen a considerable amount of territory, most of it in the Alsace and it became almost as large as Hanau-Münzenberg. Hanau-Babenhausen then changed its name to Hanau-Lichtenberg.

== Marriage and issue ==
In 1413, Elisabeth married 1413 Albert I, Count of Hohenlohe. They had the following children:

1. Kraft V (1429 – 31 March 1472), Count of Hohenlohe
2. George (1417–1470)
3. Albert II (d. 1490), Count of hohenlohe
4. Elisabeth (d. 24 December 1488), married:
  1. Louis V, Lord of Lichtenberg
  2. Hugo XIII, Count of Montfort-Rotenfels-Langenargen (d. 16 October 1491)
5. Anna (d. 8 September 1440), a nun at Klarenthal Abbey
6. Adelheid, (d. 1426), a nun, probably also at Klarenthal Abbey
7. Agneta, (d. 1426), a nun, probably also at Klarenthal Abbey
