= Reinhard I of Hanau =

Reinhard I, Lord of Hanau
- Born: c. 1225
- Died: 20 September 1281
- Buried: Arnsburg Abbey
- Noble family: House of Hanau
- Spouse: Adelaide of Münzenberg
- Father: Reinhard II of Dorfelden

Reinhard I, Lord of Hanau (c. 1225 – 20 September 1281; first mentioned in 1243) is the ancestor of the House of Hanau.

== Background ==
With Reinhard I the closed genealogy of the Lords and Counts of Hanau begins. He belongs to a family that was initially named after their ancestral Dorfelden Castle. They were first mentioned in a document in 1166/1168. From 1191, the family styled itself "Lords of Hanau". Their relationship, if any, with the earlier Lords of Buchen or the Lords of Dorfelden who ruled in the Hanau area before 1166, is not entirely clear.

== Life ==
Reinhard I was probably the son of Reinhard II of Dorfelden. Around 1243, he succeeded his uncle Henry II of Dorfelden as Lord, and reunited the possessions of his family in a single hand.

In 1260 Reinhard I accompanied his cousin Werner of Eppstein to Rome ("defying great hardships and dangers"), where Werner was consecrated as Prince-Archbishop of Mainz. As a reward, he received the post of Burgmann of Aschaffenburg, which was a completed fief after the death of Cornrad of Dornburg.

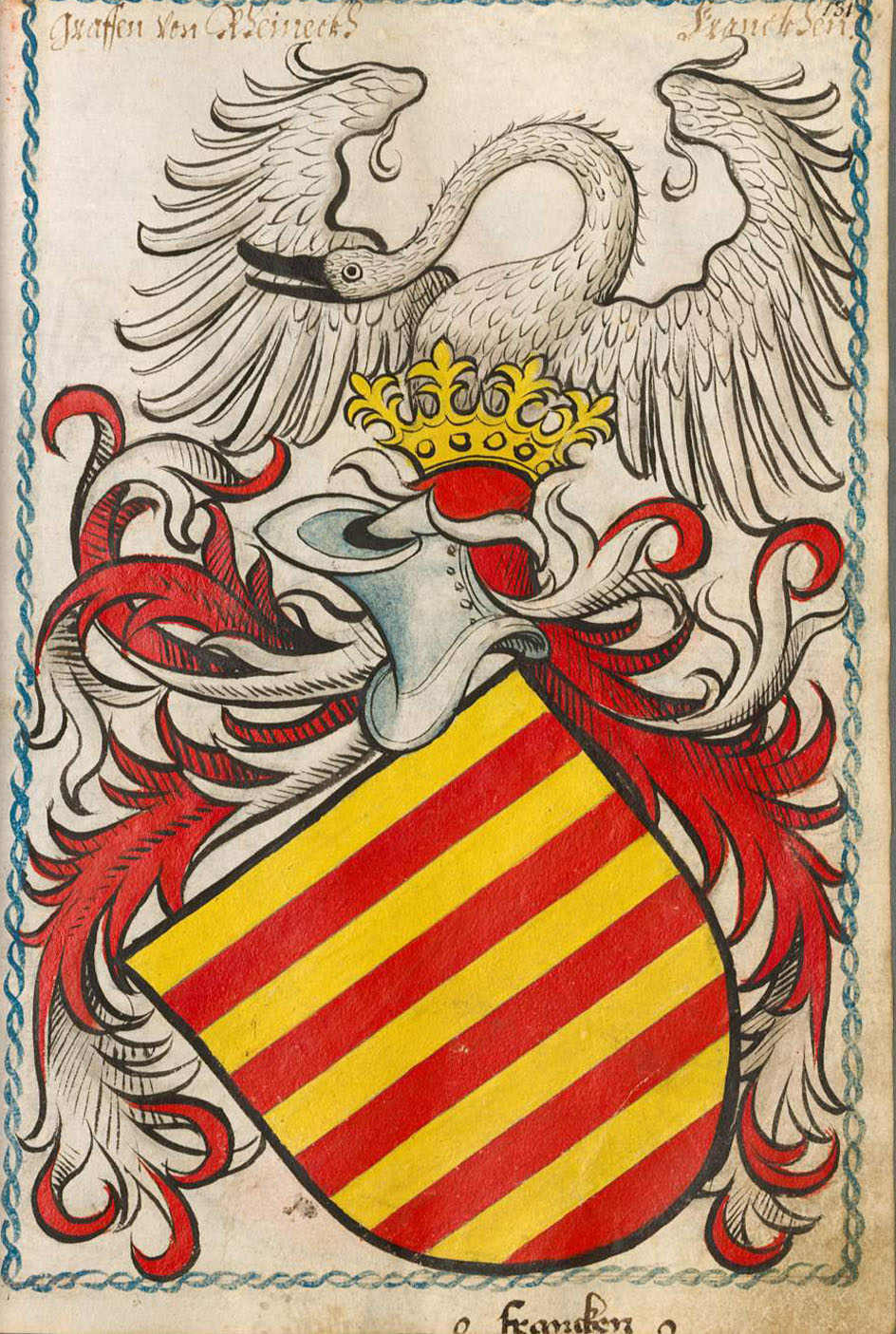
Coat of arms of the Counts of Rieneck in 1450–1480, according to Scheibler's Armorial

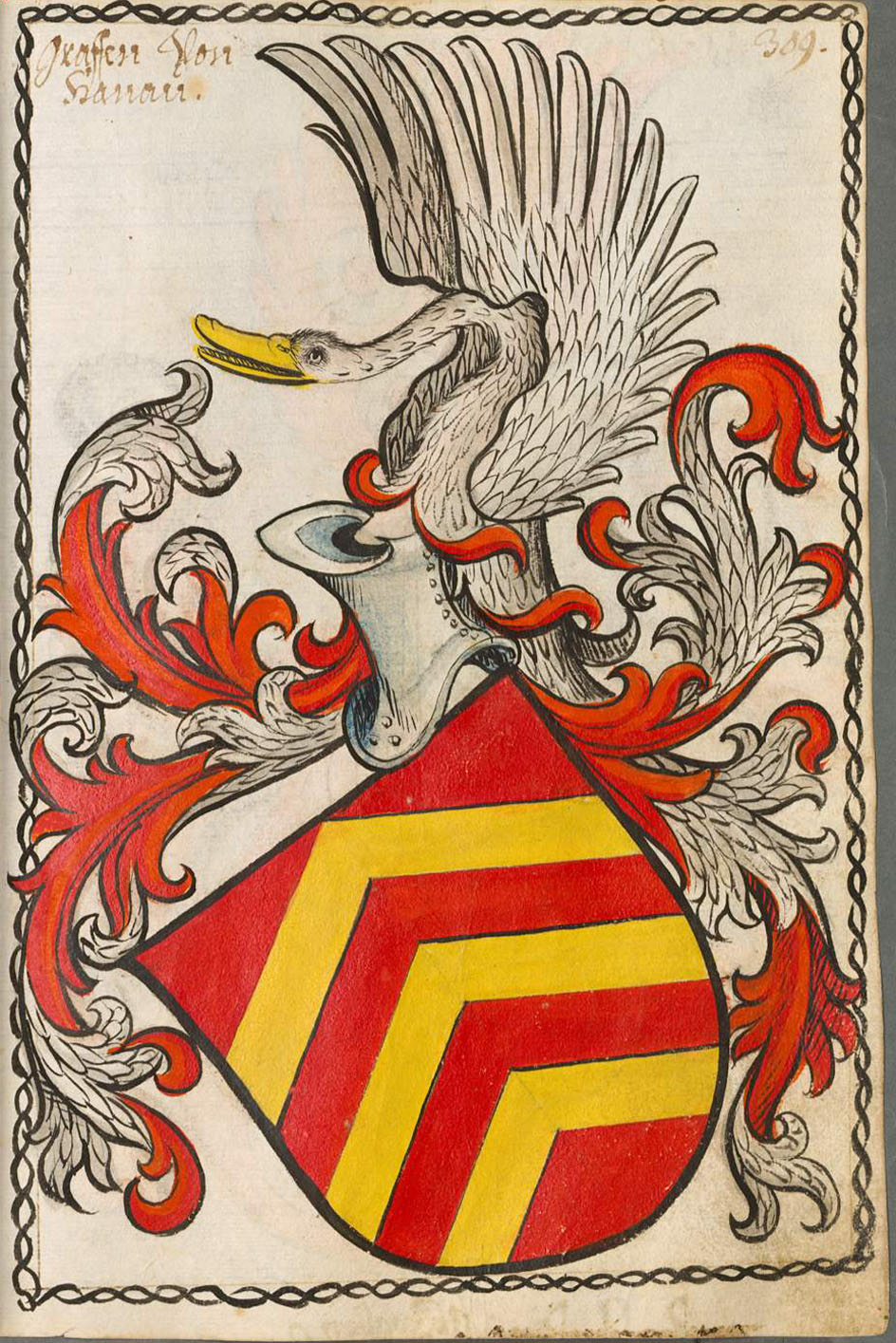
Coat of arms of the Lords and Counts of Hanau, according to Scheibler's Armorial

He actively participated in the politics of the noble houses surrounding him. In 1260, he was involved in a feud in the Spessart area. In 1265, a Public Peace was concluded by Reinhard I, the House of Hesse and other nobles in the Wetterau area. In a dispute between the Archbishopric of Mainz and the counts of Rieneck about power in the western Spessart, he stood on the side of the archbishop. This conflict lasted until 1271 and was finally won by Werner of Eppstein, who was still archbishop of Mainz. As part of the settlement, Elisabeth, the daughter of Count Louis III of Rienck, married below her station, to Reinhard I's son Ulrich I, bringing a rich dowry, which included the town of Steinau an der Straße. The Lords of Hanau, proud of gaining in status, created a coat of arms resembling the arms of Rieneck.

In 1266, Reinhard I reached an agreement with the city of Frankfurt, in which he and his heirs would receive a very high monetary compensation, if one of their subjects were to become a citizen of Frankfurt. This suggests, he was struggling with large numbers of subjects migrating to Frankfurt.

Reinhard I was from 1275 to 1279 Imperial Landvogt in the Wetterau area, and Burgrave of Friedberg. He was also Burgmann of the Kaiserpfalz Gelnhausen and of Rödelheim.

During his reign, Reinhard I managed to extend his territory. In 1255, his brother-in-law Ulrich II, Lord of Münzenberg died without a male heir. Reinhard's wife, Adelaide inherited a share of 1/6 of the Münzenberg Inheritance. In 1277, he inherited the district of Schwarzenfels from the Rieneck inheritance. He rounded off his territory by exchanging the manors in Benstadt, Stierstadt and Ossenheim with the Mariengreden chapter in Mainz for the forests of Hanau and Bulau.

== Death ==
He died on 20 September 1281 and was buried in Arnsburg Abbey.

== Marriage and issue ==
In 1245, he married Adelaide, a daughter of Ulrich I of Münzenberg. As her dowry, she brought the district of Babenhausen into the marriage. They had four children:

- Ulrich I
- Reinhard, mentioned from 1292 until 1301, most recently as canon of Würzburg
- Adelaide, abbess of Patershausen Abbey
- Isengard, married Gerhard of Weilnau after 1265, died before 1281

== Footnotes ==
Reinhard I of Hanau House of Hanau Born: c. 1225 Died: 20 September 1281
Preceded by Henry II of Dorfelden	Lord of Hanau; 1243-1281	Succeeded by Ulrich I
