= List of lords and counts of Hanau =

Coat of Arms of the Counts of Hanau-Lichtenberg

This list of lords and counts of Hanau or Hanau-Lichtenberg covers the lords and later counts from the House of Hanau, an old German noble family that ruled the area from the 14th through the 18th centuries (see also Lichtenberg Castle). Hanau is a town in Germany and Lichtenberg is a village in Alsace, now France.

== Lords of Hanau (1243–1429) ==
1243–1281	Reinhard I
1281–1305/06	Ulrich I
1305/06–1346	Ulrich II
1346–1369/70	Ulrich III
1369/70–1380	Ulrich IV
1380–1404	Ulrich V
1404–1429	Reinhard II

In 1429, Reinhard II was raised to Imperial Count

== Counts of Hanau (1429–1458) ==
1429–1451	Reinhard II
1451–1452	Reinhard III
1452–1458	Philipp I	Also known as "Philip the Younger"

In 1458, the county was divided in two parts, later named Hanau-Münzenberg and Hanau-Lichtenberg.

== Counts of Hanau-Münzenberg (1458–1736) ==
1458–1500	Philipp I	Also known as "Philip the Younger"
1500–1512	Reinhard IV
1512–1529	Philipp II
1529–1561	Philipp III
1561–1580	Philipp Louis I
1580–1612	Philipp Ludwig II
1612–1638	Philipp Moritz
1638–1641	Philipp Ludwig III
1641–1642	Johann Ernst
1642–1680	Frederick Casimir	Also count of Hanau-Lichtenberg
1680–1712	Philipp Reinhard
1712–1736	Johann Reinhard III	Also count of Hanau-Lichtenberg

In 1736, Hanau-Münzenberg fell to Hesse-Kassel

== Counts of Hanau-Lichtenberg (1458–1736) ==
1458–1480	Philipp I	Also known as "Philip the Elder"
1480–1504	Philipp II
1504–1538	Philipp III
1539–1590	Philipp IV
1590–1599	Philipp V
1599–1625	Johann Reinhard I
1625–1641	Philipp Wolfgang
1641–1680	Friedrich Casimir	Also count of Hanau-Münzenberg
1680–1736	Johann Reinhard III	Also count of Hanau-Münzenberg

In 1736, Hanau-Lichtenberg fell to Hesse-Darmstadt
