= Ulrich I of Hanau =

Ulrich I, Lord of Hanau
- Born: c. 1255/1260
- Died: Late 1305 or early 1306
- Buried: Arnsburg Abbey
- Noble family: House of Hanau
- Spouse: Elisabeth of Rieneck
- Father: Reinhard I, Lord of Hanau
- Mother: Adelaide of Münzenberg

Ulrich I, Lord of Hanau (c. 1255/1260 – late 1305 or early 1306) was the ruling Lord of Hanau from 1281 until his death.

== Birth ==
Ulrich I was the eldest son of Reinhard I and his wife Adelaide, who was a sister of Ulrich II, the last Count of Hagen-Münzenberg. He was named after his maternal grandfather, and was the first member of the Hanau family named Ulrich.

The date, or even the year of his birth, is unknown. He is first mentioned in a document dated 1272. From 1275, he appears in deeds next to his father, from 1276, he also appears alone. From 1277, he is mentioned regularly in documents relating to Hanau. This would suggest, he must have been born around 1255-1260.

== Reign ==
Ulrich I inherited the Lordship of Hanau when his father died in 1281. During his reign, he was able to extend his territory considerably.

Ulrich acted as a regent for Count Louis of Rieneck-Rothfels. In 1298, he purchased a future interest in the fief that Louis held from Mainz. He probably also acted as regent for his nephews Reinhard and Henry of Weinsberg.

=== Münzenberg inheritance ===
Via his mother, Ulrich inherited a 1/6 share of the rich Münzenberg inheritance. His inheritance included a 1/6 share of Münzenberg Castle and the district of Münzenberg, Assenheim, Heuchelheim, Dudenhofen, Münster, Werlachen, Hayn Castle and Dreieich Forest. His mother had brought the district of Babenhausen, including part of the Bachgau and half of Groß-Umstadt into his parents' marriage. Furthermore, his mother inherited Vilbel and 1/4 of Praunheim. His mother's inheritance came with a number of disputes between the heirs. These disputes, or at least Hanau's rôle in them, were largely settled in 1288.

The inheritance gave the House of Hanau quite a strong economic position. Several properties could be temporarily added under mortgage arrangenments: Ortenberg with its Castle, Birstein Castle, Orb and Besen-Kassel. These possessions connected Hanau to Steinau an der Straße, which had previously been an exclave, and pulled the upper Kinzig valley into Hanau's sphere of influence.

=== Settling disputes ===
Ulrich I secured his position through treaties with his neighbors. In 1290, he ended a long-running dispute with the Bishopric of Würzburg and in 1303, he concluded an alliance with Frankfurt, after some violent arguments. In 1304, he joined a coalition headed by Count Palatine Rudolph I of the Rhine.

=== Territorial losses ===
Hanau lost control of the Bachgau area during Ulrich I's reign. Reinhard I had ceded this area to Mainz in 1278. After Archbishop Werner of Eppstein had died, King Rudolph had terminated the fiefs Bachgau and Seligenstat Abbey and handed the administration of these possessions to Ulrich I. In 1292, King Adolph of Nassau promised the Bachgau to the Archbishop, probably as a reward for his vote when Adolf was elected King. Ulrich I ignored this promise, which led to a feud between Ulrich I and Archbishop Gerhard II of Eppstein. Ulrich I was defeated militarily and imprisoned in Bingen. He was released a short time later, however, he had to cede most of the Bachgau. He only retained the villages of Langstadt, Schlierbach and Schaafheim and some scattered rights.

For a short period, he pledged parts of his Münzenberg inheritance to the Lords of Falkenstein, who also held a share in the inheritance. Initially he pledged his share of the towns of Münzenberg and Assenheim. In 1303, he also pledged the Jews in those towns and in Nidda, whom the King had pledged to him. He presumably needed the money to participate in a campaign of King Albert I of Germany against the Archbishop of Mainz in 1301/1302. After he repaid the long, a long ownership dispute about these possessions with Lords of Falkenstein began.

=== Alliance with the King ===
Ulrich I was very close to the King and participated in a number of the King's military campaigns:

- 1277 in the fight against King Ottokar II of Bohemia
- 1286 and 1287 against Count Eberhard I of Württemberg
- 1288 against Count Reginald of Montbéliard
- 1289 against Erfurt
- 1294 against Thuringia
- 1298 against Albert I of Germany. Albert I won the war after the Battle of Göllheim and Ulrich I was taken prisoner. Ulrich I quickly changed sides, and in 1300 we find him in the entourage of Albert I, who is then King of the Romans.
- 1301 and 1302 he took part in a campaign of the new King against the archbishop of Mainz. The King won, and rewarded Ulrich I with the imperial fiefs that had belonged to Gerlach of Breuberg. These possessions were in and around the imperial cities of Frankfurt and Gelnhausen, giving Ulrich a foothold in these cities. He also the right of justice over Gründau and Selbold.
- 1305 against Bohemia
- 1305 against Count Eberhard of Württemberg again

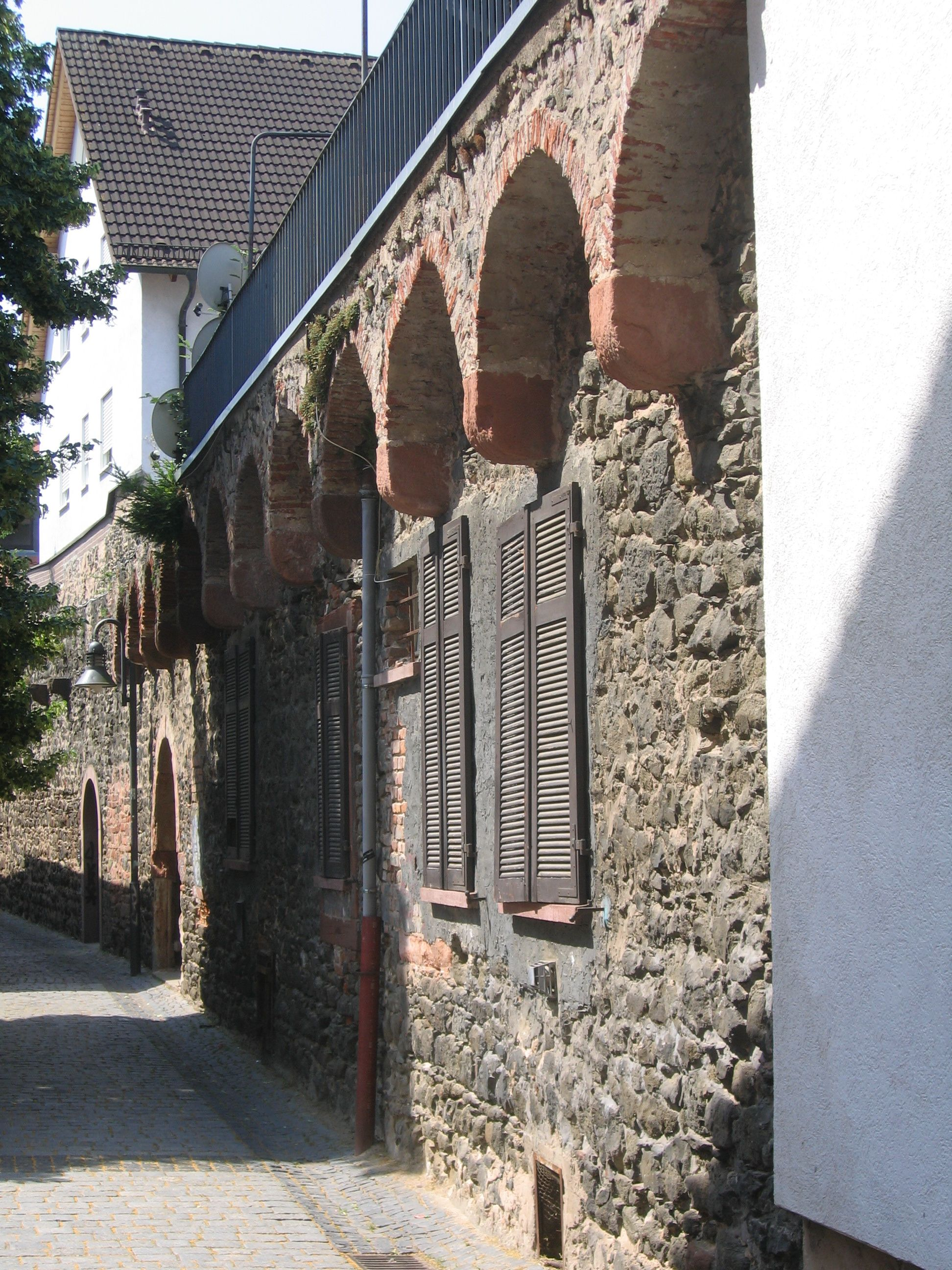
City walls of the Old Town of Hanau

Being so close to the King brought advantages for Ulrich's own territory. Four of his towns were granted city rights:

- On 5 August 1288, King Rudolph I granted city rights to Windecken (today: part of Nidderau), modeled on those of Frankfurt
- On 4 July 1290 Steinau an der Straße was granted a city charter modeled on Gelnhausen
- On 28 March 1295 Babenhausen received its city charter, modeled on Frankfurt, from King Adolph I
- And finally, on 2 February 1303 the town of Hanau was granted city rights modeled on Frankfurt by King Albert. This included market right and the right to elect a city council presided by two mayors. Serfs could gain their freedom by residing in Hanau for a year and a day ("Stadtluft macht frei "). During this period, the construction of Hanau's first city wall began.

=== Regional representative of the King ===
In 1294, abbot Henry V of Fulda was deposed, after he had severely mismanaged his territory. King Adolf appointed Ulrich I as the Fulda's administrator. His reign appears to have been very successful, and he was even able to redeem several mortgages.

The greatest success of Ulrich I's policy was his appointment in 1300 as Landvogt of the Wetterau. He retained this post until his death. However, there is very little information of what he achieved as Landvogt. His post was meant to strengthen the King's position in his disputes with the Electors in the Rhine area, who were led by the Archbishop of Mainz. At the request of the King, Ulrich I conquered and destroyed Steinheim Castle, which was defended by Siegfried of Steinheim, a nephew of the Archbishop.

His appointment as landvogt provided Ulrich with influence outside his own territory. In particular, he was the first Lord of Hanau to have jurisdict over the Bornheimerberg district, which extended Hanau’s influence to a semi-circle of territory, almost surrounding Frankfurt on the northern side. This district would later be annexed to the Lord’s of Hanau. Ulrich's jurisdiction included important cities, such as Oppenheim, Boppard, Wesel, Frankfurt, Friedberg and Gelnhausen.

== Death ==
Ulrich I died in late 1305 or early 1306. He was buried in Arnsburg Abbey.

== Marriage and issue ==
On 2 October 1272 Ulrich I was engaged to Countess Elisabeth of Rieneck (c. 1260 – c. 1300), the daughter of Count Louis III of Rieneck. At the time, both were children or perhaps teenagers. The actual marriage would take place six years later. This marriage would be very advantageous for the Hanau family, both materially and in terms of status. The background for this marriage was an earlier conflict between the Archbishopric of Mainz and the counts of Rieneck about influence in the western Spessart region. Ulrich's father, Reinhard I, had supported the Archbishop, Werner of Eppstein in this long-lasting conflict and when it was finally decided in Mainz's favour in 1271, one of the conditions of the peace treaty was that Ulrich would marry Elisabeth, and that her dowry would include the city of Steinau an der Straße. This dowry considerably strengthened Ulrich's position. The exact extent of the dowry can no longer be determined, as the relevant documents are lost. However, there was a problem: the relatives of Ulrich's mother, the Counts of Hagen-Münzenberg were "only" ministeriales. One condition for the marriage was that she would be raised to proper nobility. On 25 October 1273, King Rudolph I of Germany raised Adelaide as desired.

Ulrich I and Elisabeth had the following children:

1. Ulrich II
2. Adelaide (first mentioned in 1306 – before 1325), married before 1315 to Lord Conrad V of Weinsberg (before 1301 – 1328)
3. Conrad (first mentioned in 1343 – after 1352), prebendary of Fulda monastery. In the older literature, there is some doubt that his is really related to the Hanau family. However, his seal includes the coat of arms of Hanau.

The older literature also mentions a Margaret, who married Count Gerhard of Katzenelnbogen. However this Margaret was actually a countess of the Mark. As the deed which call Maragaret a countess of Hanau contains more such mistakes, it can be assumed to be a fake.

== Footnotes ==
Ulrich I of Hanau House of Hanau Born: c. 1255/1260 Died: late 1305 or early 1306
Preceded by Reinhard I	Lord of Hanau; 1281–1305/06	Succeeded by Ulrich II
