= Ulrich II of Hanau =

Ulrich II, Lord of Hanau
- Born: c. 1280/1288
- Died: 23 September 1346
- Buried: Arnsburg Abbey
- Noble family: House of Hanau
- Spouse: Agnes of Hohenlohe-Weikersheim
- Father: Ulrich I, Lord of Hanau
- Mother: Elisabeth of Rieneck

Ulrich II, Lord of Hanau (c. 1280/1288 – 23 September 1346) was Lord of Hanau from 1305/1306 until his death.

== Childhood ==
He was the son of Ulrich I and his wife, Countess Elisabeth of Rieneck. Nothing is known about his childhood. He is not mentioned in official documents until he took office. The earliest possibility (c. 1279) is derived from the date of his parents' wedding (1278). The latest possibility (c. 1288) is derived from the fact that he must have been at least 18 years old when he took office. The fact that he married four years after taking office, suggests a birth date near the end of the range.

== Reign ==
=== Political activities ===
In 1310, Ulrich militarily assisted King John of Bohemia, a son of Emperor Henry VII. In return the Emperor mortgaged him the Jews in the cities in his territory (Babenhausen, Hanau, Steinau an der Straße and Windecken) for 600 pounds of Heller.

In 1314, Ulrich was at the election of Emperor Louis IV in Frankfurt, as a member of the entourage of the Elector of the Palatinate Louis II. Ulrich II actively participated in the pacification of the Wetterau region. In this process, the local nobility agreed to resolve their disputes in a court of law, rather than fighting a feud.

In 1339, Ulrich decreed the primogeniture in Hanau. This was one of the earliest decrees of this kind in Germany. The decree was repeated several times by later counts, for example in 1343 and in 1375. Nevertheless, the ruling family would divide the county when this was considered convenient politically, for example in 1456 and in 1685.

Shortly before his death, Ulrich II was outlawed; the reason for this is unknown. Emperor Louis IV tasked Frederick of Hutten, the governor of the Wetterau was tasked with implementing this judgement. The issue appears to have been settled amicably soon afterward. Further details are not known.

=== Acquisition of territory ===
In 1316, Ulrich purchased justice over the district of Brandenstein and half of justice over the district of Schlüchtern from the Count of Rieneck. The bishop of Würzburg, who was the liege lord of this property, agreed to the sale. Hanau would acquire the other half of the justice over Schlüchtern in 1377, exchanging it for “Büttert Castle“ (Bütthard Castle). In 1457, the Count of Hanau also became protector of Schlüchtern Abbey.

In 1317, the owner of Trages Manor put himself under Ulrich II's suzerainty.

In 1320, King Louis IV mortgaged the district of Bornheimerberg to Ulrich II, as a payment for services rendered during a raid in the Alsace. This mortgage was renewed by Emperor Charles IV in 1351. In 1434, Count Reinhard II was finally enfeoffed with Bornheimerberg.

The Imperial City of Gelnhausen was mortgaged to Hanau by King Louis IV in 1326. In 1330, the citizens were absolved from their allegiance to the emperor and asked to swear allegiance to the Lord of Hanau. But shortly afterwards this mortgage was released.

Ulrich II's maternal uncle, Count Louis V of Rieneck died in 1333. With his death, his line of the House of Rieneck died out in the male line. Under an agreement Louis V had made with Ulrich I in 1296, Hanau would inherit Rieneck's feudal rights. However, in 1329, Louis V had decreed that his daughter Udelhilt would inherit. This gave rise to a complicated inheritance dispute, which involved other lines of the House of Rieneck and the two largest feudal lords in the area, the Electorate of Mainz and the Bishopric of Würzburg. Ulrich II eventually made significant territorial gains:

- Half the justice over the district of Bieber
- The larger part of the district of Lohrhaupten
- Half the district of Partenstein
- A quarter of the castle and district of Rieneck
- Half the county of Prozelten
- A share of Rothenfels Castle
- The city and district of Lauda
- The city of Osterburken
- The bailiwick of Dörnigheim
- Justice over the district of Schwarzenfels
- A number of other fiefs and feudal rights

== Marriage and issue ==
Ulrich II married in 1310 Agnes of Hohenlohe-Weikersheim (before 1295 – 29 November 1346), a daughter of Kraft I of Hohenlohe-Weikersheim. Ten children from this marriage are known, but not the order in which they were born. Historians have been able to infer the order in which the sons were born.

1. Ulrich III (1310 – 1369/70)
2. Reinhard, custodian of the cathedral in Mainz
3. Kraft (d. 1382), a canon of Cologne, Mainz, Würzburg and Worms
4. Louis, (d. after 1386), Archdeacon in Würzburg
5. Gottfried (d. after 1372), Commander of the Teutonic Knights
6. Conrad (killed in 1383), Abbot of Fulda monastery
7. Elizabeth (d. after 1365), married to Count Philip V of Falkenstein
8. Adelaide (d. after 1378), married to Count Eberhard II of Katzenelnbogen and after his death, to Henry II of Isenburg
9. Agnes (d. after 1347), a nun in Patershausen Abbey
10. Irmengard (d. after 1348), a nun in the convent at Gerlachsheim, mentioned between 1343 and 1347

== Death ==
Sources give two different dates for the death of Ulrich II: 2 September 1346 and 23 September 1346. He was buried in Arnsburg Abbey, the place members of the house of Hanau were buried usually until the 15th century. Already in the years 1343, a deed is created, which gives Ulrich II's daughter Adelaide the right to visit her father's grave twice a year. The grave was located in the enclosed part of Arnsburg Abbey, so it was not generally accessible.

== Footnotes ==
Ulrich II of Hanau House of Hanau Born: between 1280 and 1288 Died: 23 September 1346
Preceded by Ulrich I	Lord of Hanau; 1305/06-1346	Succeeded by Ulrich III
