= Arnsburg Abbey =

Historic structure in Hesse, Germany

- Kloster Arnsburg
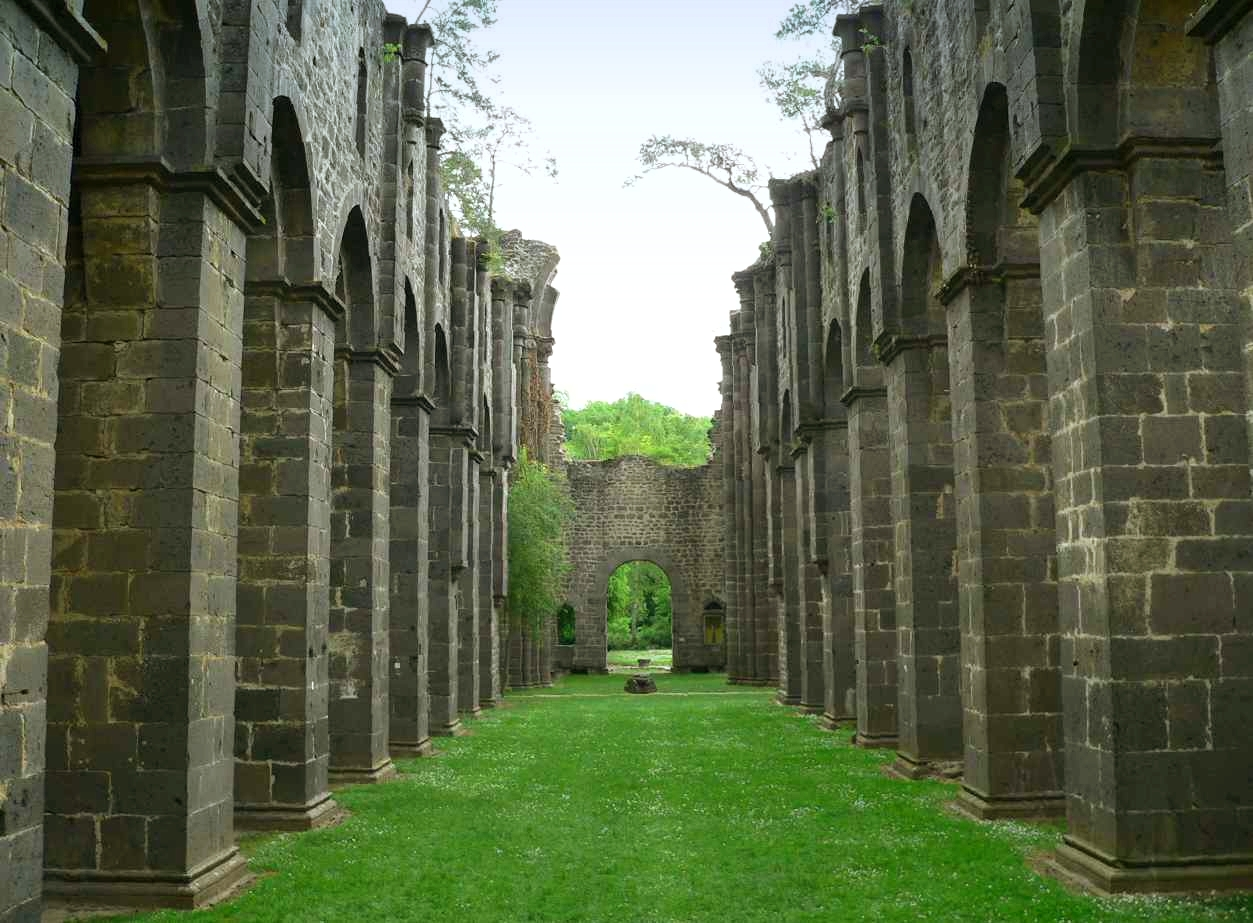
- The roofless abbey church

- Location within Hesse Location within Germany

Monastery information
- Order: Cistercian
- Established: 1174
- Disestablished: 1803
- Mother house: Eberbach Abbey

Site
- Location: near Lich, Hesse
- Coordinates: 50°29′37″N 8°47′32″E

Arnsburg Abbey (German: Kloster Arnsburg) is a former Cistercian monastery near Lich in the Wetterau, Hesse, Germany. It was founded by monks from Eberbach Abbey in 1174. Although heavily damaged in the Thirty Years' War it was rebuilt later in the 17th century and prospered in the 18th century, when much of the abbey was rebuilt in Baroque style.

Secularized in 1803 and abandoned by its monks in 1810, its buildings were given to the Grafen (Counts) von Solms-Laubach, who adapted them as their seat. The abbey church today stands as a roofless ruin, but many of the outbuildings are still intact and have seen various uses over the past 200 years. Since 1960 the abbey has also been the site of a war memorial, containing the graves of German soldiers and Soviet, Polish and Romanian prisoners-of-war/forced labourers as well as those of 87 people shot by the SS in the final days of World War II. The abbey is partially open to the public.

== Geography ==
Arnsburg Abbey is located on the Wetter river, near the former Bundesstrasse 488 (now Landesstraße 3053) between Lich and Butzbach. The region is also known as Wetterau. Administratively, the area is an Ortsteil of Lich (also named Kloster Arnsburg), part of the Landkreis Gießen.

== History ==
=== Previous structures ===
==== Roman castrum ====
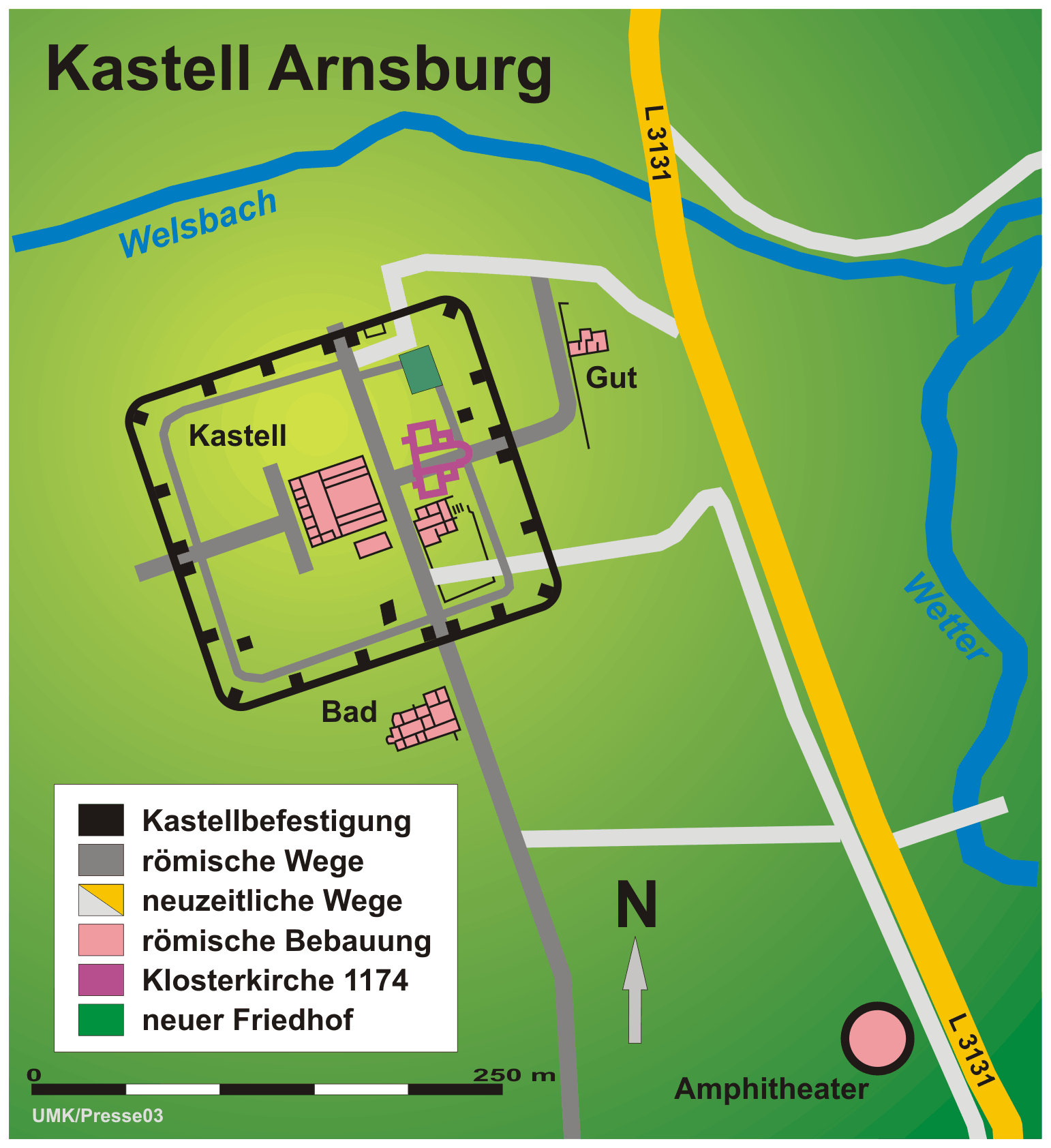
Map of the castrum and the first abbey

In the 1st century AD, the Roman Empire under Emperor Domitian expanded its territory in Germania at the expense of the local Chatti. The Limes Germanicus was extended to the northeast to include most of the area now known as Wetterau. The Limes passed a few hundred meters north and east of the location of the later abbey. Around 750 meters southwest of this area the Romans built a castrum, later known as Kastell Arnsburg/Alteburg, which housed a cohort of around 500 soldiers. The castrum encompassed an area of 2.9 hectares, protected by a surrounding rectangular wall with 14 towers and four gates (each flanked by another two towers). This was the most northeastern full-sized castrum of the Limes. Along with the rest of the border, it was vacated by the Romans in 250/260.

==== Medieval castles ====
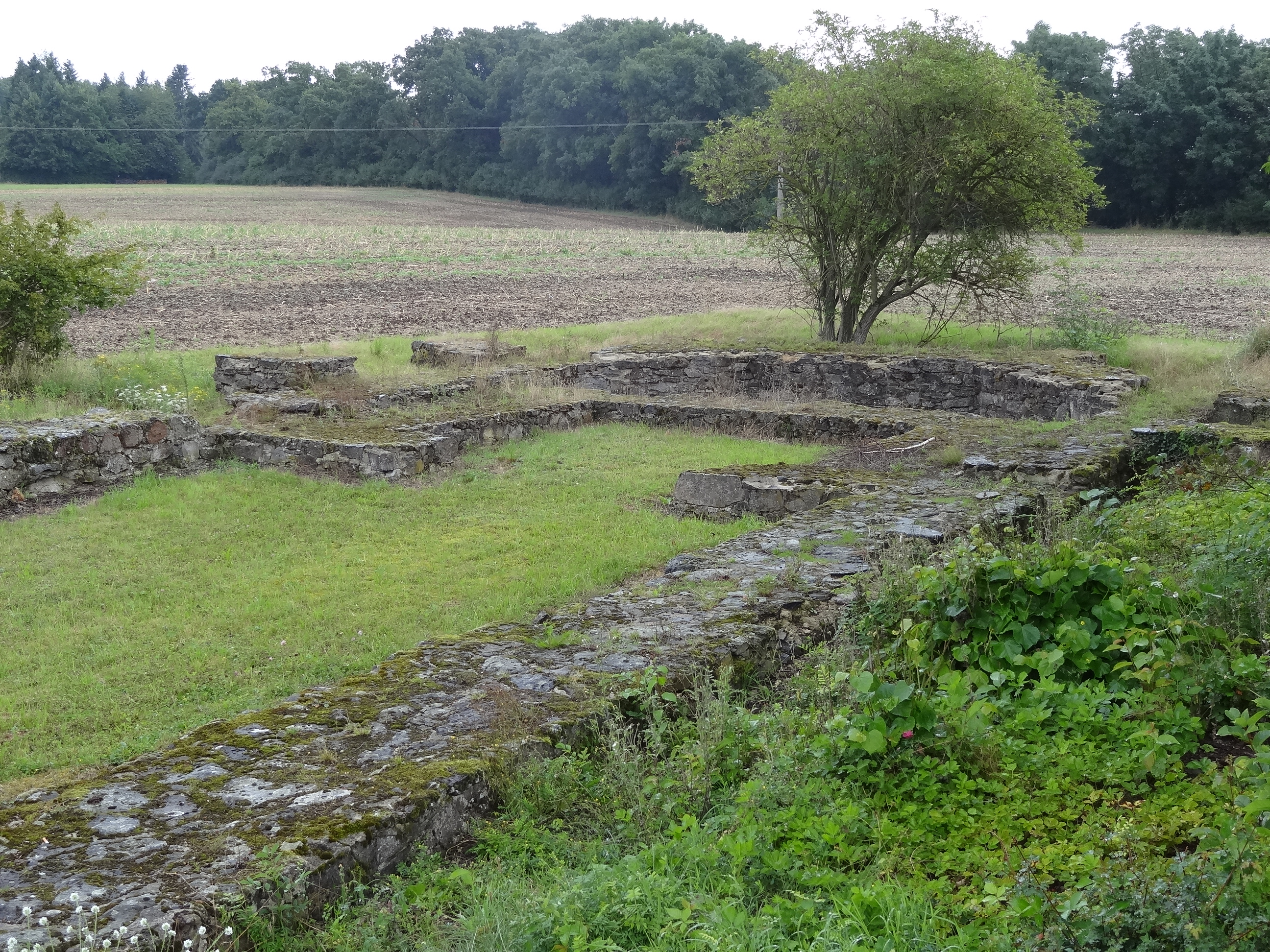
Remains of Burg Arnsburg

The area then disappeared from history until the Middle Ages. In between, it was settled by the Franks but whether there was a continuity of use of the Arnsburg area is unknown. Research is currently under way in this regard with excavations at Villa Arnesburg, a place mentioned in 1151 and 1174. This village was later abandoned (Wüstung) but may have been a local place of settlement in late Antiquity, bridging the abandonment of the castrum and the building of the castles.

Excavations indicate that a first castle was built to the northwest of the later abbey (c. 800 AD) and a second castle followed around 1000 AD in the area called Hainfeld, between the former castrum and the abbey site. This second castle overlooked the steep bank of the Wetter and was constructed in four phases over c. 150 years before it was abandoned shortly after 1151. This castle is known as Arnsburg.

The etymology is unclear. The ruling local family had no tradition of members being named "Arn" or "Arnold". One possibility is that it derived from Castellum Hadrianum (Hadriansburg) after the Roman Emperor Hadrian during whose reign the castrum was built. Another is that the name derived from Aar (eagle), reflecting the Roman Eagles and/or the heraldic use of the bird by Kuno of Arnsburg after serving two German emperors. By the 15th century, the monks of the abbey translated "Arnsburg" into Latin as castrum aquilae.

The first local lord known by name is Kuno von Arnsburg, who served Emperor Heinrich IV as a Ministerialis in 1057. Around 1064 he married Gräfin Mathilde of the House of Bilstein. Their daughter, Gertrud (b. c. 1065, d. before 1093) married Eberhard von Hagen (1075–1122), lord of Burg Hayn near Frankfurt, who moved his seat to Arnsburg and changed his name to "von Hagen und Arnsburg". Under Eberhard's son, Konrad I (1093–1130) the family became the most powerful in the Wetterau and the Rhine-Main region. Konrad II exchanged properties with Fulda Abbey, receiving the land of Münzenberg Castle not far from Arnsburg. His son, Kuno I (1151–1207), from 1156 styled himself von Münzenberg, implying that by then a castle had been built at Münzenberg and the one at Arnsburg had been vacated.

==== Benedictine monastery Altenburg ====
In 1150/1 Konrad II and his wife Luitgard set up a Benedictine monastery known as Altenburg and provided it with rich gifts. They granted it the land where the castrum once stood. The position on a hill was in line with Benedictine standards and the Roman ruins could serve as a source of building materials. The monks from Michaelsberg Abbey, Siegburg made only slow progress, however, and in 1174 the monastery was abolished. Only the eastern part of a church had been built at that point (transept and choir). These likely had been finished, as roof slates have been found. However, work on the church's nave probably never even started. Late 19th-century excavations discovered the remains of the castrum's praetorium still in situ where the nave would have been located. The transept of what would have been a three-aisled basilica measured 33 by 12 meters and the square choir 8 by 8 meters. No other foundations have been found – according to Benedictine custom, the church was the first permanent building to be constructed. The monks likely still lived in temporary wooden houses when the monastery was dissolved in 1174.

Two extant documents pertain to this monastery. Heinrich, Archbishop of Mainz, who was the ecclesiastical superior of the monastery, confirmed its establishment in a document dating to February or March 1151. A document signed by Emperor Friedrich I in 1152 provided Royal protection to Altenburg.

=== Cistercian abbey ===
==== Foundation ====
Due to a lack of progress on the Benedictine house, Kuno I von Münzenberg eventually contacted the abbot of Siegburg Abbey, Nikolaus, and managed to convince him to withdraw the monks from Altenburg. By then he had already made advances to the Cistercians to found an abbey for several years. A preferences for that order was in keeping with the times, as rulers of the 12th century tended to favour the "reform orders". They also refrained from exercising the rights of ownership over newly founded abbeys, leaving them to the responsible (Arch-)Bishop. Cistercians also usually asked to be exempted from the Vogt system, whereby the secular ruler retained some administrative or judicial rights. Kuno gave the Cistercians the property of the former Benedictine monastery as well as his old castle of Arnsburg. He had come to an agreement with abbot Pontius of Clairvaux as early as February 1171. The general chapter of the Cistercians then ordered the abbot of Eberbach Abbey, Gerhard, to send monks to Arnsburg. On 16 July 1174 in a formal meeting in Münzenberg Castle, the founding document was presented to the monks.

However, for unknown reasons, construction of the new abbey was also delayed. It is not clear whether a group of monks arrived soon after the agreement of 1174 and then left again, or whether the whole enterprise was delayed for a long time. What is known is that only in 1197 did the monks led by the new abbot Mengot arrive at Arnsburg and construction started.

The first building to be raised was the church, which was consecrated in 1246. The Klausur and the economy buildings of the abbey followed. The abbey originally was awarded the property of the Benedictine house: land and farms (Hofgüter) in various locations including Arnsburg, near Frankfurt and near Mainz; as well as fishing rights and the tithing rights for two villages. Estimates put the total property of the young abbey at around 175 hectares.

==== Middle Ages ====
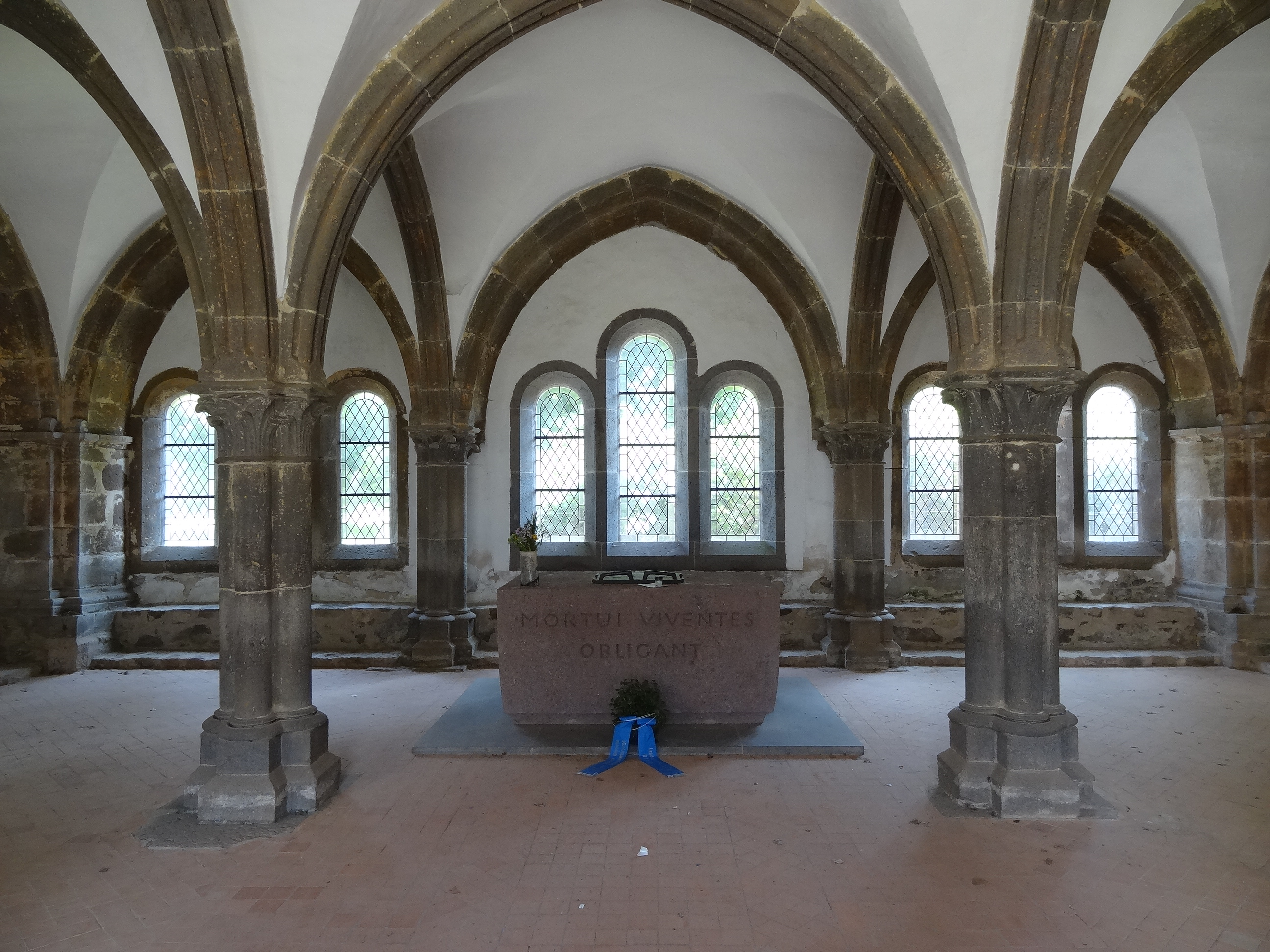
Gothic chapter hall with war memorial

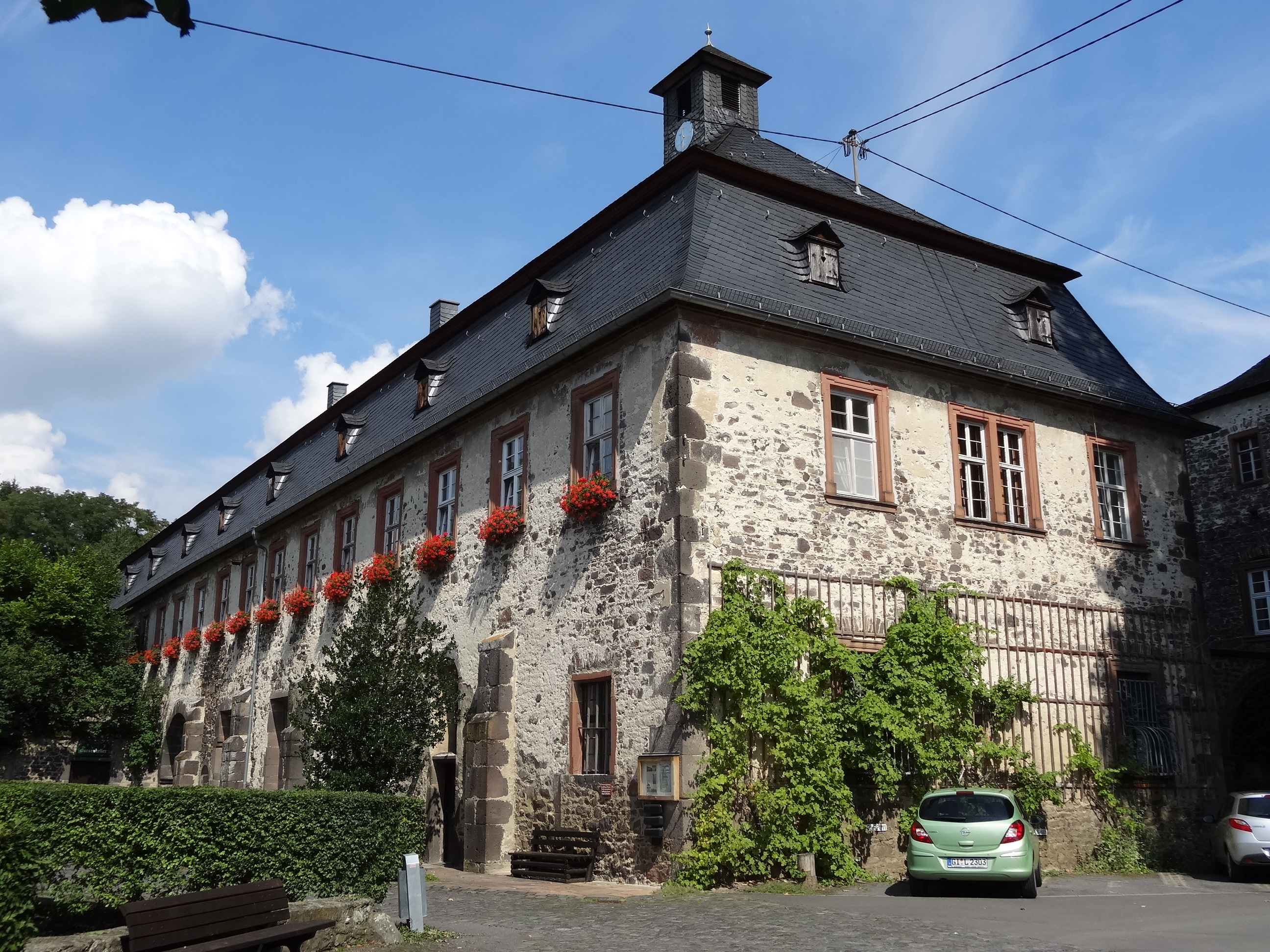
Bursenbau

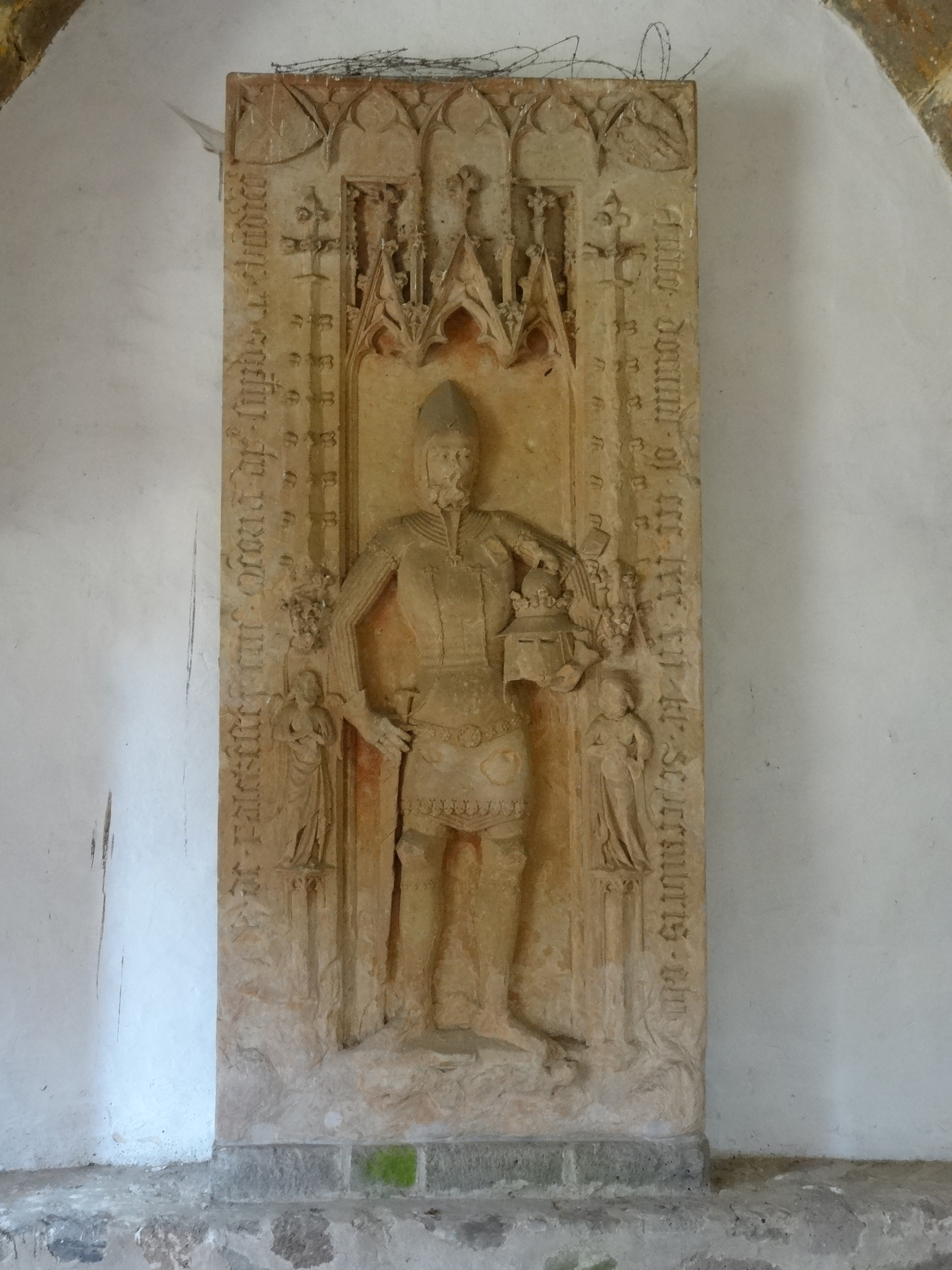
Tomb stone of Johann von Falkenstein (1365)

The abbey was initially largely independent of secular influences. The founder had reserved only the status of "patron" in 1174 and in 1219 Emperor Friedrich II just granted his "protection" to the abbey, which was projected from Friedberg Castle. Nevertheless, the Vogt rights retained by the secular lords created some tensions of time, as the family of Falkenstein-Eppstein and then the Grafen von Solms inherited the lordship over the area from the Münzenbergers.

By the late 14th century, the abbey owned property in (or rights to income from) 270 locations between Fulda, Wetzlar, Gelnhausen and Mainz. It also had houses in Frankfurt, Friedberg, Gelnhausen, Gießen, Wetzlar and other towns.

The number of monks varied significantly over time: records are available for 1390 (more than 100 monks and lay brothers), 1525 (37 monks, 10 lay brothers), 1631 (19 monks, 3 lay brothers), 1673 (12 monks), 1701 (35 monks) and 1774 (43 monks and 3 novices).

In 1404, the convent denied Archbishop John II of Nassau financial support and as a consequence he seized the abbey's properties in the Rheingau, Wetterau and on the Main river. He also "banned" it and threatened its destruction. However, in 1406 Werner von Falkenstein, Archbishop of Trier, came to the abbey's help and stationed a troop of 400 soldiers there to protect it. The abbey had to bear the significant cost of supporting them. In addition, during the confrontation a reported 26 farms were burned and damages totaling 73,000 Gulden were inflicted on abbey property.

In 1457 the dormitory of the lay brothers burned down and – after having been rebuilt – collapsed. Plundering also caused damage, so that by 1489 the abbey had to seek a loan from Antoniterkloster Grünberg.

==== Reformation (16th century) ====
In 1541/2 abbey and secular lord were able to resolve differences about practices at the abbey with an agreement that gave the lords considerable influence over finance, administration and even the day-to-day life of the monks. However, in 1562 Graf Reinhard died and the line of Solms-Hohensolms-Lich now joined the Reformation and tried to change the abbey and environment. Although some members of the reform order joined this movement, it engendered opposition from the powerful Archbishop of Mainz. At the election of a new abbot in May 1574 the Solms family and Mainz both denied the other side's right to send a delegation. The Solms family claimed sovereignty over the abbey, which insisted that it enjoyed imperial immediacy (Reichsunmittelbarkeit) and was therefore free from any other authority than the Emperor. Although the Aulic Council at Vienna ruled in favour of the abbey in 1715, the Solms objected and the proceedings continued to drag on for decades, without having been resolved in 1803 when the abbey was dissolved.

==== Thirty Years' War (17th century) ====
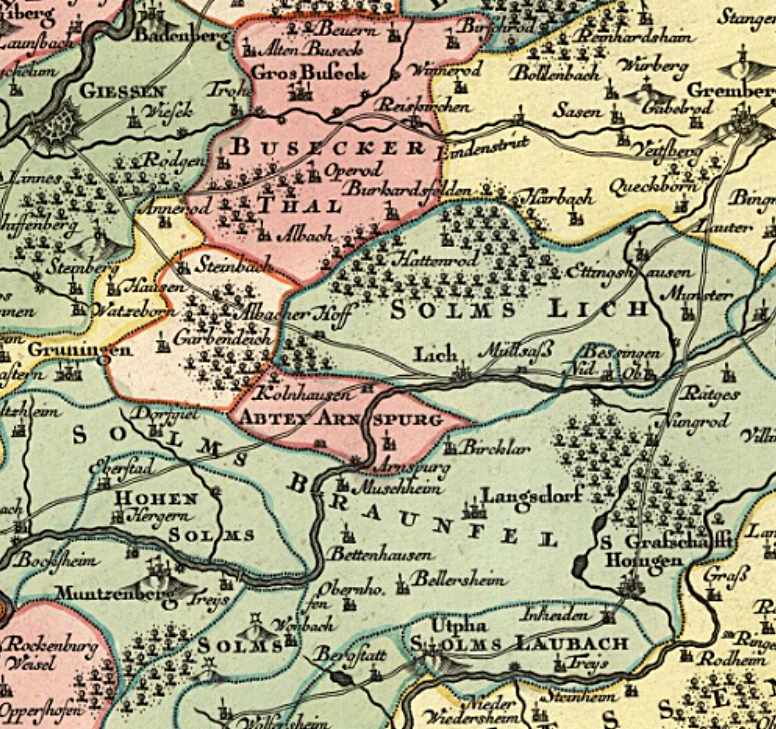
Arnsburg Abbey's territory on an 18th-century map

Like many other monasteries, the abbey was significantly damaged during the Thirty Years' War. In 1623, the Gothic Heiligkreuzkapelle (chapel of the holy cross) on the Hainfeld (built 1399) was desecrated and plundered by Protestant peasants. The holy cross relic was brought to the abbey church, where a chapel was dedicated to its veneration. There it was probably destroyed in 1631 by a peasant from Eberstadt. That year the area was occupied by the Swedish troops and the monks were forced to flee. The newly elected abbot Adam Will and some of his monks went to Clairvaux where he was ordinated. He returned to Arnsburg in 1634 but the fighting continued and at one point only the abbot and a lay brother remained, with both of them living in hiding. The abbey was occupied by the Swedish and their Solms allies in 1631/2. Part of the furnishings, including the organ, were dragged off to Lich. The tombs of the founders and abbots, the church and its altars were desecrated. A 1661 list presented to the Emperor lists the damages: all the furnishings were taken, the altars destroyed and even the roofs of church and dormitory had been disassembled and carried off. Most other buildings were heavily damaged or completely demolished.

It took decades to repair the abbey. The monks used the vestibule, which had apparently survived, for services. The first service in the church itself took place only in 1672.

The 17th century (like the 16th century before) was a period of low standards and widespread violations of the order's rules. Abbot and monks lived a life resembling that of contemporary secular nobles rather than adhering to the Cistercian rules. They went hunting, feasted and kept women, especially under abbot Georg Heyl (1663–69).

==== Final prosperity and dissolution (18th century) ====
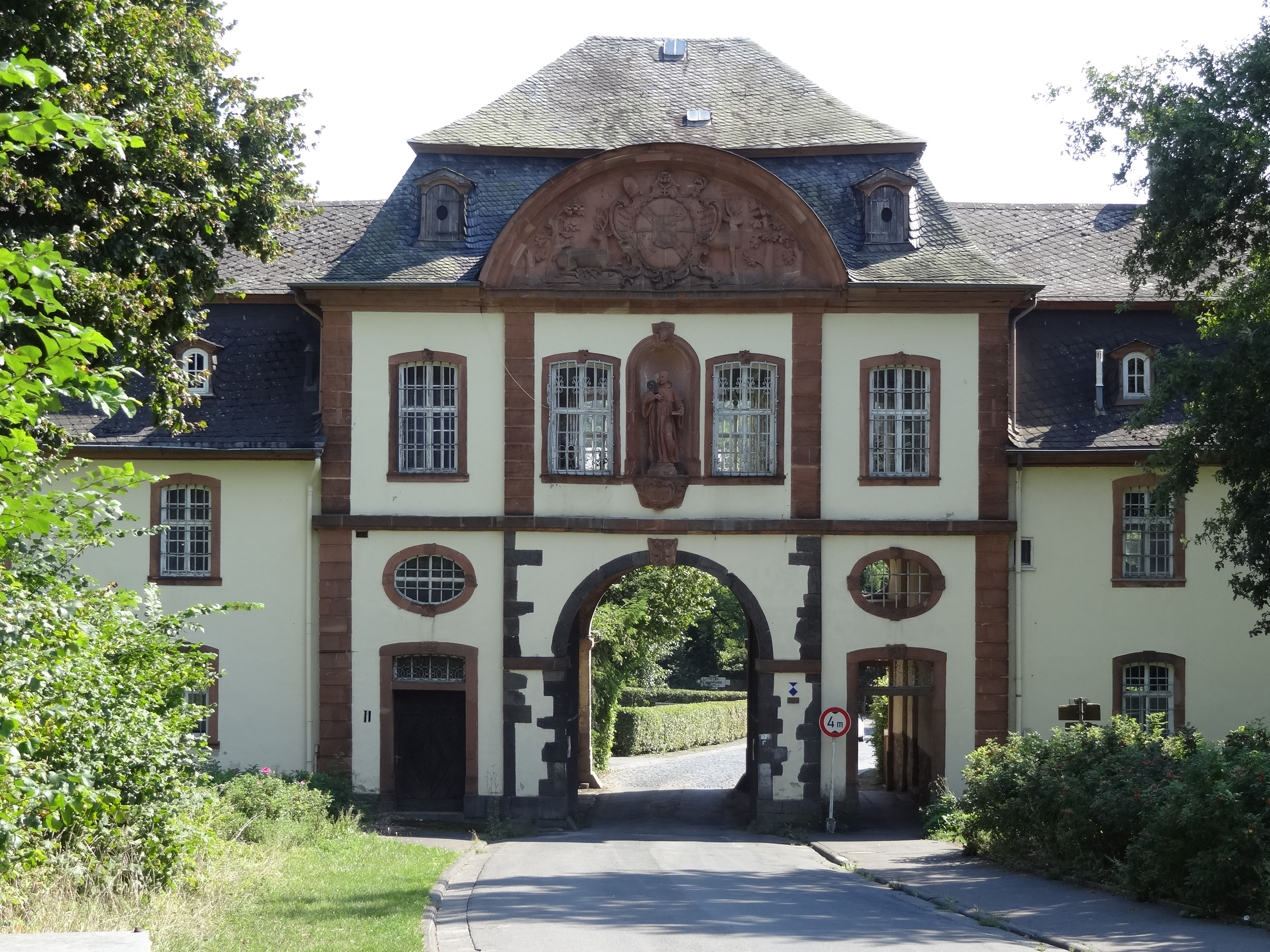
Baroque Pfortenbau

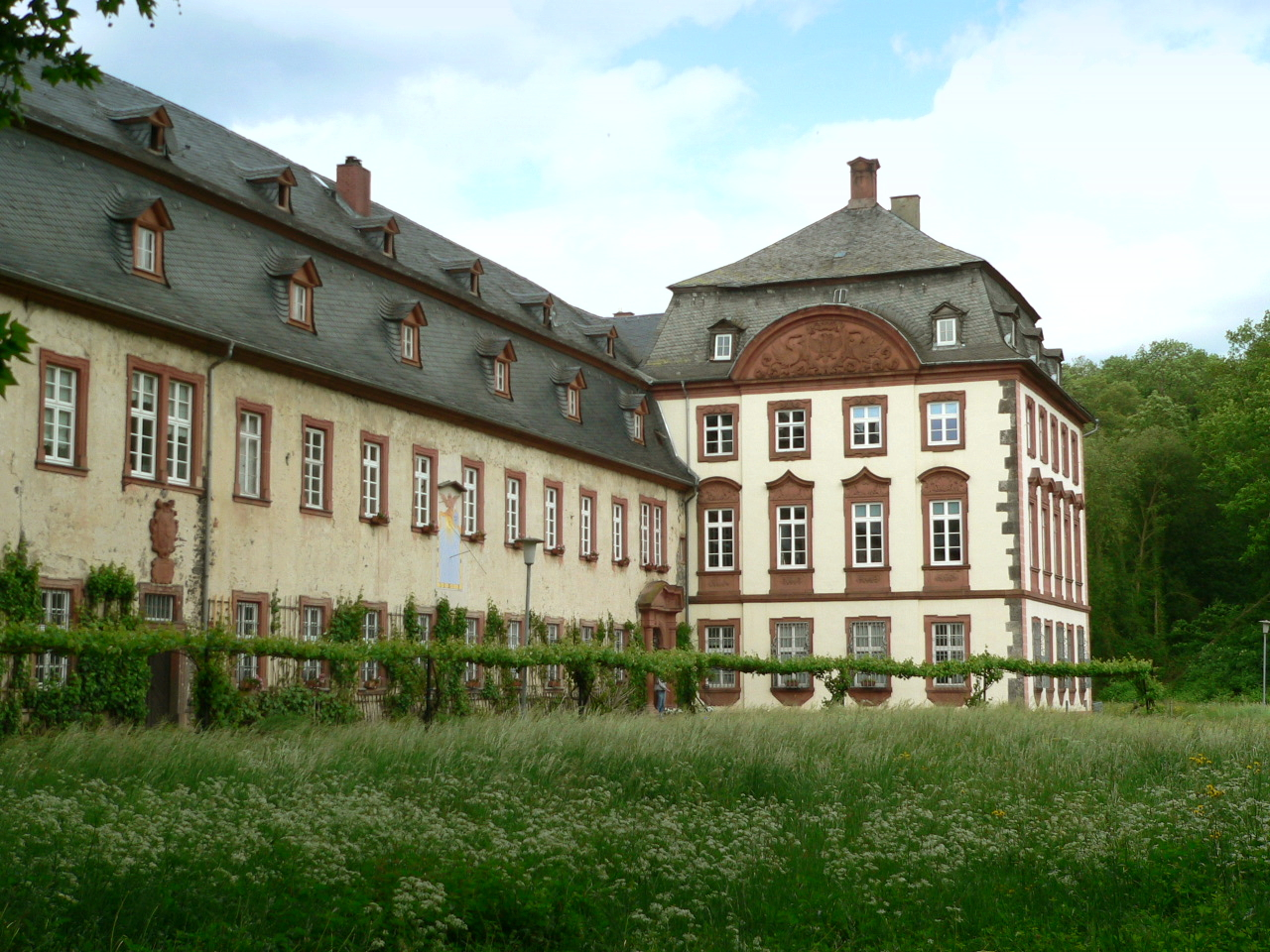
Main building and Prälatenbau

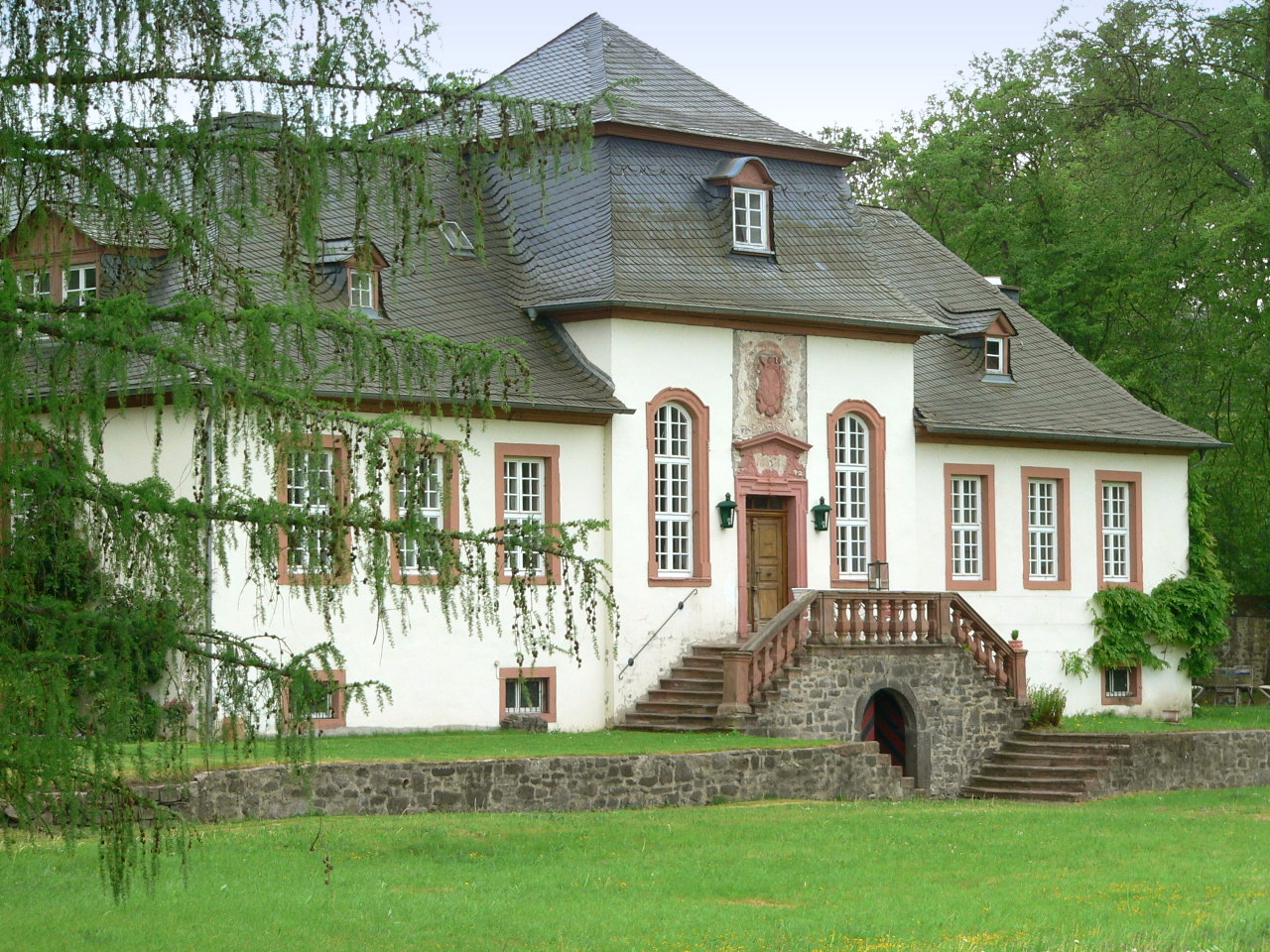
Gartenhaus

The 18th century once again brought troubles during the War of the Austrian Succession (1740s) and the Seven Years' War (1750s/60s). In the years after 1759 the region was the site of armed conflict and the abbey was plundered three times. The abbot had to flee five times. Monks were kidnapped and had to be ransomed on several occasions.

Nevertheless, the 18th century was a period of late prosperity for the abbey and it saw the great renovation of the buildings in Baroque style. Under abbot Robert I Kolb (1673–1701) the damage of the Thirty Years' War was finally overcome and the most crass violations of the order's rules ended. These stricter policies were also followed by abbots Conrad Eiff (1708–14) and Peter Schmitt (1746–72). However, the way of life of the Arnsburg monks of the 18th century was still far from the original ideals of the order and they enjoyed a high standard of living and a relatively comfortable life. This was reflected in the pomp of the Baroque reconstruction that created abbey buildings and outposts among its properties that resembled secular palaces and manor houses.

Under abbot Kolb the church was restored. He also added a tower to the church and a new cloister. In addition, Kolb restored the main altar and several side altars. Abbot Antonius Antoni (1714–45) had the Bursenbau, the convent the library, the main building and the Prälatenbau restored. Peter Schmitt built the Küchenbau and the Gartenhaus, he also restored the church roof. Finally, under abbot Bernhard Birkenstock (1772–99) the gate house was erected. All of this vastly changed the appearance of the abbey and significantly increased its size. At the same time, the library was restocked. From almost complete destruction in the 1630s it was rebuilt to 2,100 tomes by 1708 and 15,000 by 1784.

The final abbot, Alexander Weitzel, was ordained in 1799. During German mediatisation the abbey was dissolved in 1802/3. Like many others, its properties were awarded to secular princes who had lost territory west of the Rhine to French expansion, in this case the House of Solms. The Solms family divided up the property in contracts of November 1802 and March 1804 between its individual lines: Solms-Braunfels and Solms-Lich received around 1,500 hectares, Solms-Laubach 1,350 hectares including the abbey itself (owning it to this day) and Solms-Rödelheim-Assenheim 1,260 hectares.

Since the Solms family were Protestants, the former catholic monastery became part of the parish of Gonterskirchen (until 1808 or 1815) and then of the parish Wohnbach (until 1859).

=== Post-dissolution ===
After the monks left, the abbey was soon turned into a prison/insane asylum and workhouse, but this only lasted until 1811. In 1847 a house for "fallen women" was established at the Gartenhaus and in 1877 expanded into the Bursenbau. The vestibule of the church served for decades as a sheepfold, before being cleared in the 1870s. From the late 19th century on it was being used as a Protestant place of worship until 1944. Then, due to damage delivered by Allied bombing to its original building, the gynaecological clinic of Gießen moved here and occupied some of the buildings. From 1957 to 1960 a children's home followed. After this was moved to Lich, a retirement home was opened. Later a hotel operated in the upper floors of the Bursenbau.

Until 1953 Arnsburg was an unincorporated area directly administered by the Landrat of the Gießen district. From 1953 to 1976 it was an independent municipality. Since 1976 it has been an Ortsteil of Lich.

==== War graves cemetery ====
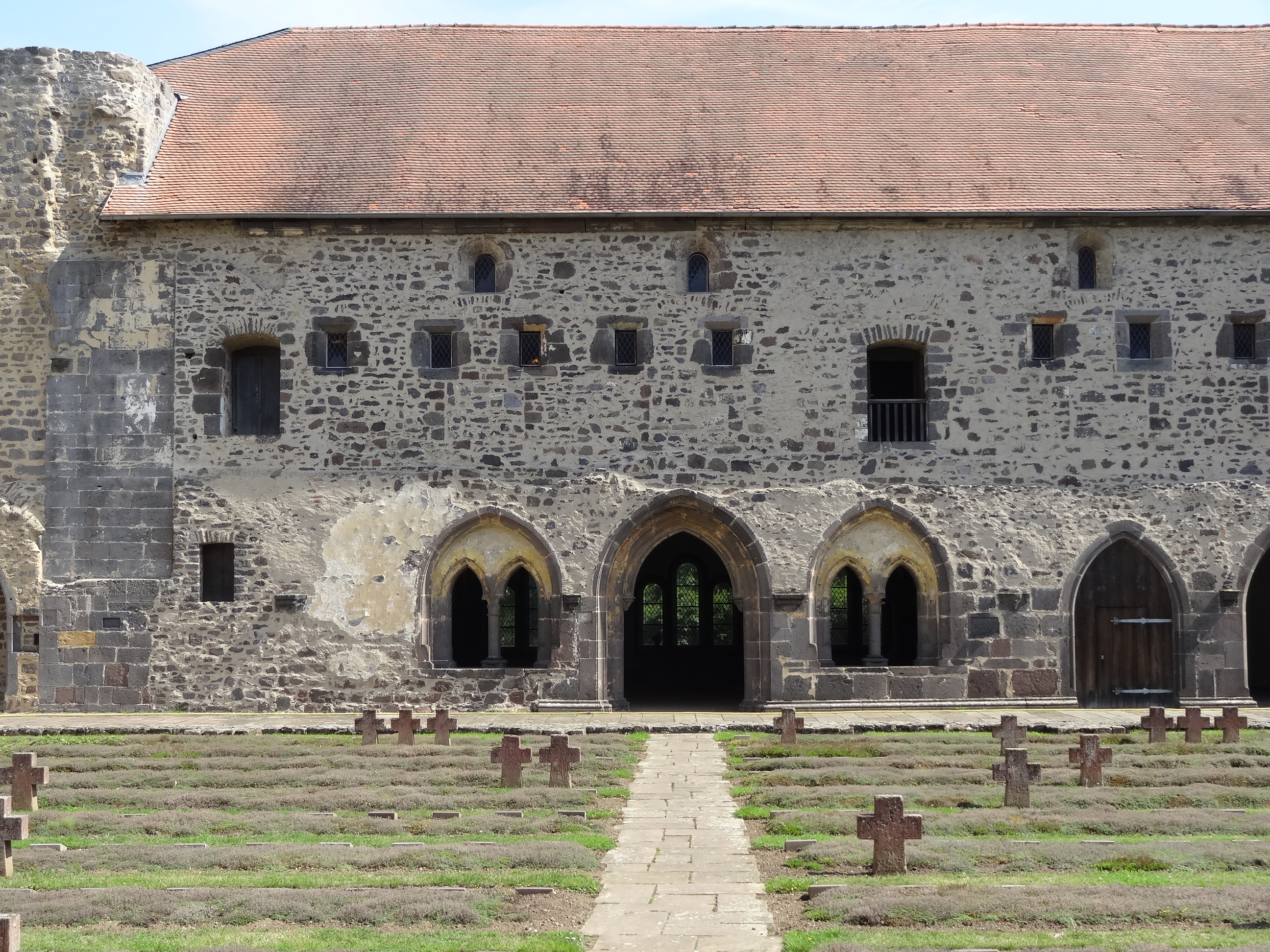
War grave cemetery with Gothic Ostflügel in the back

In the mid-1950s the idea was mooted to turn part of the abbey into a war grave cemetery for those killed in the area during the fighting of World War II. It was decided to build the cemetery in the area of the former cloister after the then owner, Georg Friedrich Graf zu Solms-Laubach gave the permission. The cemetery was created in 1958–60. It contains the graves of 447 people who had been previously buried at various sites across the districts of Alsfeld, Büdingen and Gießen. Among the interred are German soldiers as well as prisoners-of-war and forced labourers from the Soviet Union, Poland and Romania. There are also 81 women and 6 men – Germans, Luxemburgers, French, Soviets and Polish – who had been shot by the SS at Hirzenhain shortly before the arrival of the U.S. troops. Only one of these 87 killed is known by name.

== Description ==
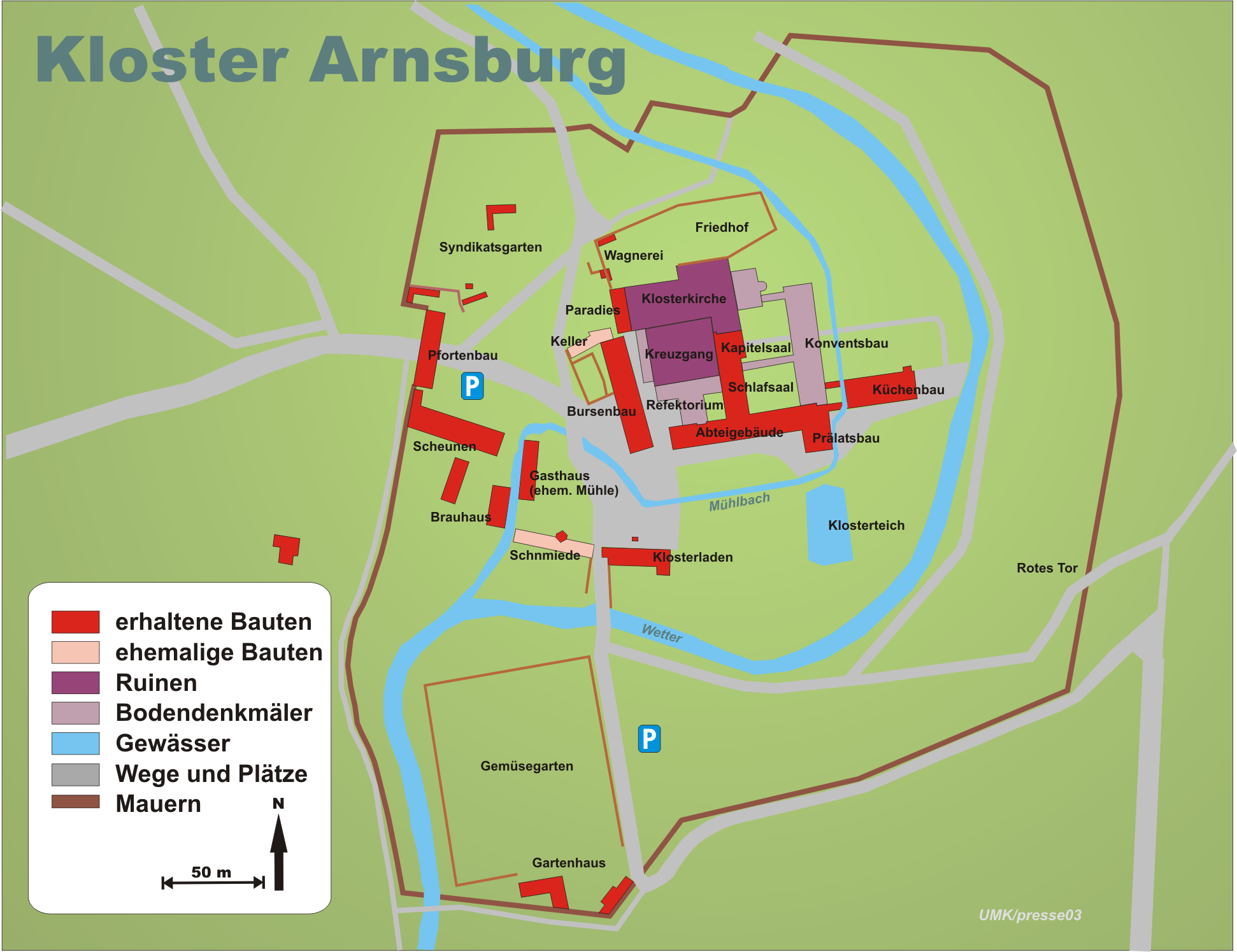
Map of the abbey

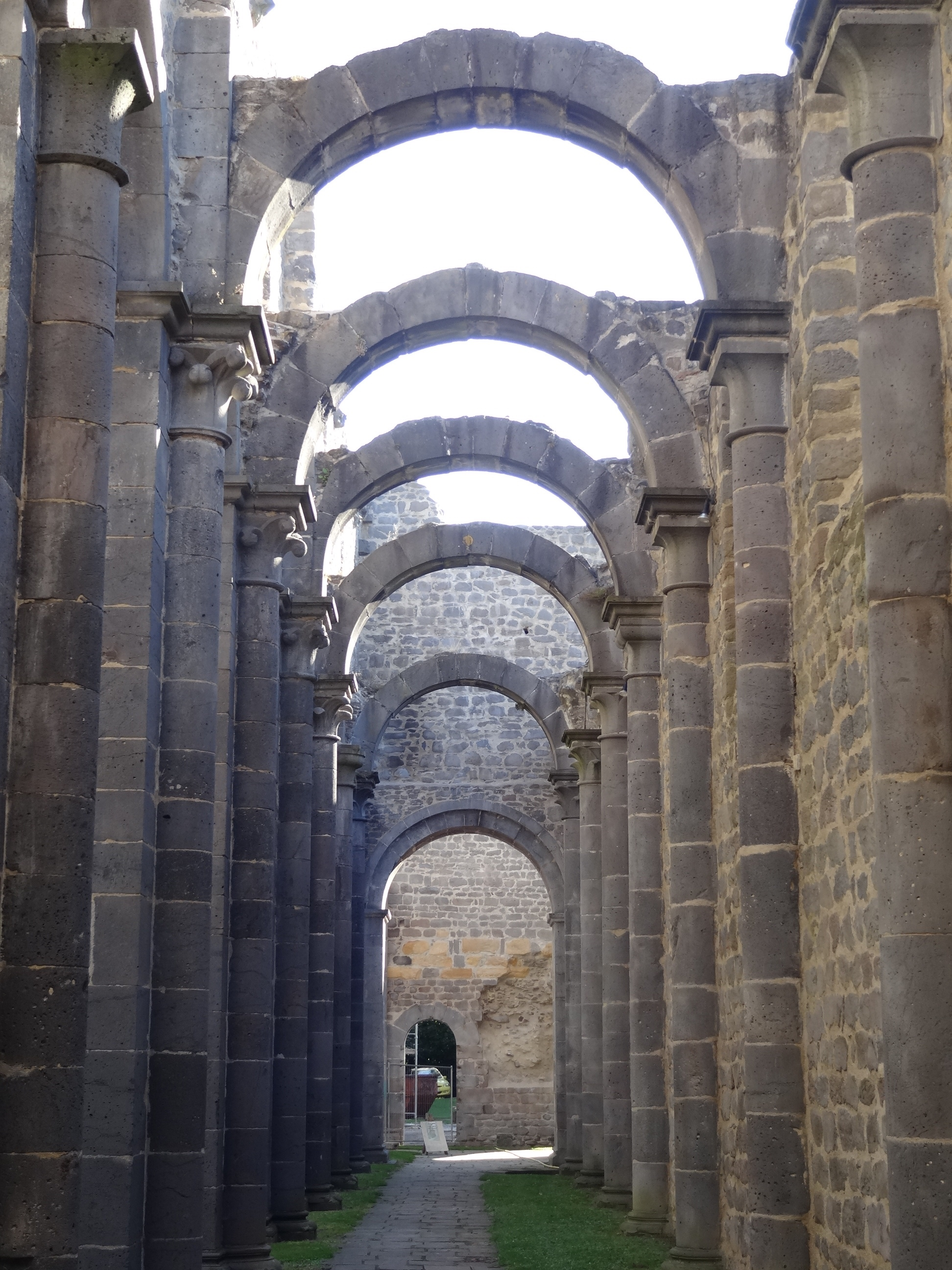
Side aisle of the church

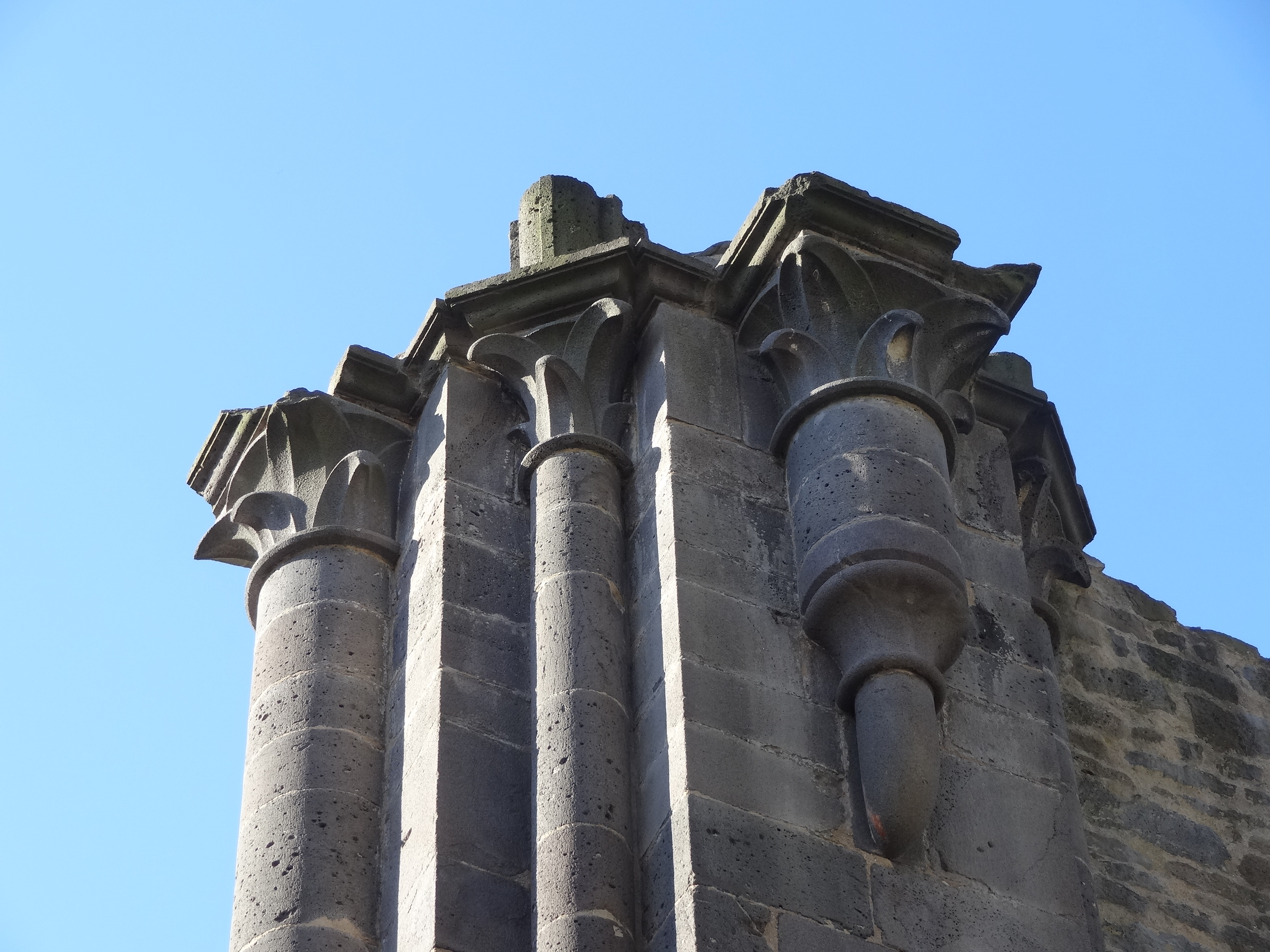
Church ruin

The abbey lies in a bend of the Wetter river, on low ground. A mill run is diverted upstream and flows through the abbey precinct. Today, the site is a mixture of various architectural styles from the late Romanesque to the Baroque. The state of preservation differs significantly.

The abbey is surrounded by the Medieval wall of around 1.6 km length, which encircles the complete abbey precinct, including territory on the left bank of the river. This includes the Gartenhaus and the former vegetable garden. The main entry into the abbey is by the Baroque Pfortenbau (1770s) giving access to the outer yard with the economy buildings (barn, water mill, brewery and stables). Of the late 17th-century smithy only a stairway tower remains. The Bursenbau (originally c. 1250, renovated in the 18th century) makes up the final front of the outer courtyard. This building contained the refectory and the dormitory of the lay brothers. To its north is the former vestibule of the abbey church, the only part of that building that is still roofed. It is used today as a Protestant place of worship.

The cloister, or inner yard, is surrounded by the Bursenbau, the church ruin, the main abbey building (1775), and the early Gothic eastern wing (Ostflügel) that housed the dormitory for the brothers on the upper floor and the chapter hall, which doubled as the burial site of the abbots, on the lower floor. The former was demolished in the 19th century, but has been reconstructed and now serves as a venue for concerts. The latter has become part of the war grave cemetery, with a memorial to the war dead. The war cemetery now occupies the cloister, where rows of graves are interspersed with crosses made of Basaltic tuff.

The cloister was almost completely demolished in the 19th century but has been partially reconstructed. Its four wings were likely built immediately following completion of the church, i.e. around 1250. The open space in the centre was roughly square, around 27 by 32 meters. The cloister walkways were about 4 meters wide, and via Gothic arches open to the central space. The western and southern wing of the cloister probably used to have an upper floor.

To the east, the main building connects to the still extant Prälatenbau (1727) and Küchenbau (1747). These used to front on a park to the south, of which only a pond remains. The 18th-century Konventbau, extending north from the Prälatenbau, was almost completely demolished in the 19th century.

The large, roofless church lies to the north of the cloister. It was a three-aisled late Romanesque hall basilica built from Londorfer Basaltlava. Since the 19th century demolitions of the upper works, the roof and arches (except for an area in the northern side-aisle) have been gone. With the vestibule to the west and a cycle of eleven chapels at its eastern end the church in total measured over 85 meters in length. The transept was around 33 meters long whilst the nave was 24 meters wide. Estimates put the height of the central aisle at around 20 meters at the top of the arch. Stylistically, the church was most likely built between 1200 and 1250, starting with the eastern structures (choir and transept), followed by the first two bays of the nave (c. 1220) and then, after only a short break, the western bays.

== Today ==
The counts of Solms-Laubach remain owners of the abbey. For decades, the Gartenhaus has been home of the Dowager Countess Madeleine, a daughter of Gustav Albrecht, 5th Prince of Sayn-Wittgenstein-Berleburg.

The abbey is open to the public, although some parts are private. A restaurant, Alte Klostermühle operates in the former water mill.
