= Bodo III of Stolberg-Wernigerode =

Bodo III, Count of Stolberg-Wernigerode
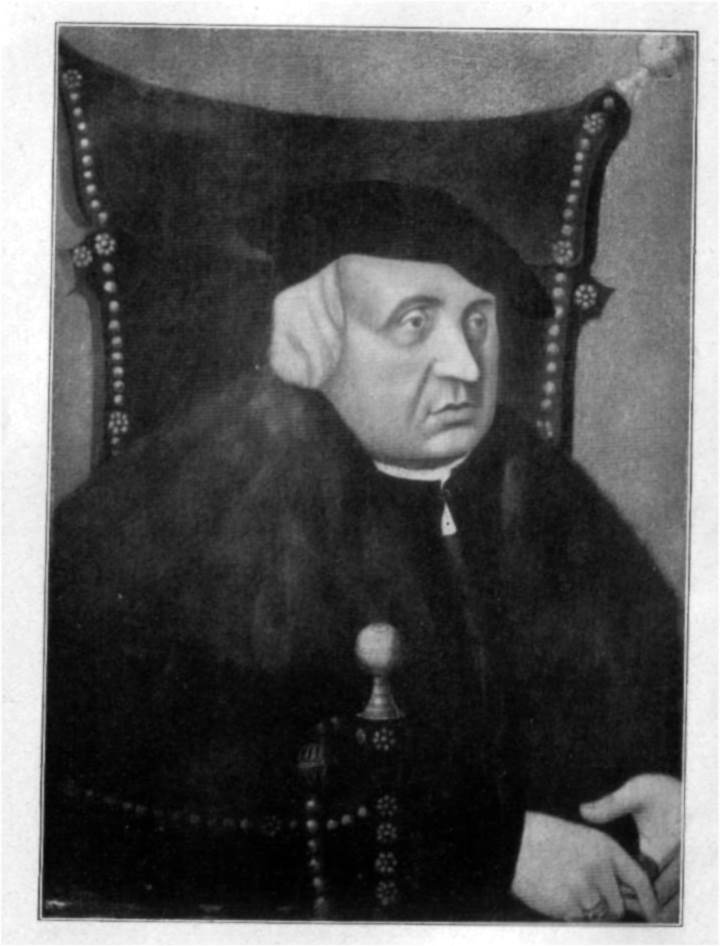
- Bodo III, Count of Stolberg-Wernigerode
- Born: 4 January 1467; Stolberg
- Died: 22 June 1538 (aged 71); Stolberg
- Noble family: House of Stolberg
- Spouse: Anna of Eppstein-Königstein
- Issue: Wolfgang; Bodo; Anna; Louis; Juliana; Maria; Henry; Philip; Magdalene; Eberhard; Catherine; Albert; Christopher
- Father: Henry IX of Stolberg
- Mother: Matilda of Mansfeld

Count Bodo III of Stolberg-Wernigerode (4 January 1467 − 22 June 1538), nicknamed "the Blissful", was Count of Stolberg and Hohnstein and Lord of Wernigerode from 1511 until his death.

== Life ==
He was born in Stolberg, the son of Count Henry IX "the Elder" of Stolberg and his first wife Matilda, daughter of the Count Volrad of Mansfeld. He had a twin brother Henry the Younger.

Bodo spent some of his youth in southern Germany, where he was raised at the court of Count, later Duke Eberhard II of Württemberg, the brother of his stepmother. After providing knight services for several years, he made a journey to Jerusalem from 16 April 1493 to 9 February 1494.

He was a skillful diplomat. In 1491 and 1492, the financial situation in Stolberg necessitated an extraordinary transformation of the administration, in which the responsibility for the county's finances was transferred to the Treasurer and the administration was directed by educated officials. Because he was such an able administrator and negotiator, he was employed by the emperor, as well as his liege lords and larger estates. Sometimes he acted on a temporary basis, sometimes offices or business were given to him. The first to employ him, was Duke George of Saxony, whom he served as a captain in Coburg. George expanded his demands beyond what was normally expected of a vassal and sent Bodo to the Diet and other unusual missions.

Bodo's historic significance, however, does not lie in any specific service that he did for any particular prince, but primarily in his relationship with the largest prelate of the empire: Cardinal Albert, who was archbishop of Magdeburg and Mainz. From 1515 until his death, he was the Cardinal's councillor or chaimberlain for the dioceses of Magdeburg and Halberstadt, i.e. he represented the Cardinal, or acted on the Cardinal's behalf in the many matters of varying significance that were entrusted to the Cardinal. When confronted with the Reformation, the count followed his nature and that of his master, and acted mostly mild and conciliatory. Bodo enjoyed the unconditional confidence of the Cardinal, although he requested to be relieved of his duties after only a few years. His county and his family suffered from his prolonged absence and in 1524, he insisted that he be relieved from his duties. From that date, he would only provide advice from home.

Apart from his service to Cardinal Albert, Bodo also acted as councillor to Emperors Maximilian I and Charles V, who thanked him with special ceremonies in 1518 and 1521, respectively. In 1521, Charles V proposed to make him a member of the second Imperial Government at Nuremberg, but Bodo declined the offer.

== Marriage and issue ==
Bodo married on 24 August 1500 at Königstein with Anna, the sister of Eberhard IV, who was the last Lord of Eppstein and from 1505 Count of Königstein. After Eberhard died childless in 1535, Königstein, including Eppstein, was inherited by Bodo's sons Louis (d. 1574) and Christopher (d. 1581).

Bodo and Anna had many children:

- Wolfgang (1 October 1500 − 8 March 1552), married Dorothea of Regenstein-Blankenburg and Genoveva of Wied
- Bodo (1502 − after 2 May 1503)
- Anna (28 January 1504 − 4 March 1574), the 28th Abbess of the Imperial Abbey at Quedlinburg
- Louis (12 January 1505 − 1 September 1574), Count of Stolberg-Wernigeorde, married Walpurga Johanna of Wied-Runkel
- Juliana (15 February 1506 − 18 June 1580), married Philip II, Count of Hanau-Münzenberg and William I, Count of Nassau-Siegen, she is regarded as the matriarch of the House of Orange-Nassau
- Maria (8 December 1507 − 6 January 1571), married Kuno II, Count of Leiningen-Westerburg
- Henry (2 January 1509 − 12 November 1572), Count of Stolberg-Wernigerode, married Elisabeth of Gleichen-Rembda
- Philip (24 May 1510 − after 21 September 1531)
- Magdalene (6 November 1511 − 19 November 1546), married Ulrich IX, Count of Regenstein-Blankenburg
- Eberhard (1513 − 21 April 1526)
- Catherine (24 October 1514 − 18 June 1577), married Albert, Count of Henneberg
- Albert (2 March 1516 − 4 July 1587), Count of Stolberg-Schwarza
- Christopher (10 January 1524 − 8 August 1581), Count of Stolberg-Gedern

== Bibliography ==
- Eduard Jacobs (1893). "Stolberg-Wernigerode, Botho III. Graf zu" . Allgemeine Deutsche Biographie (in German). Vol. 36. Leipzig: Duncker & Humblot. pp. 327–329.
