= Philipp Ludwig I of Hanau-Münzenberg =

Philipp Ludwig I, Count of Hanau-Münzenberg
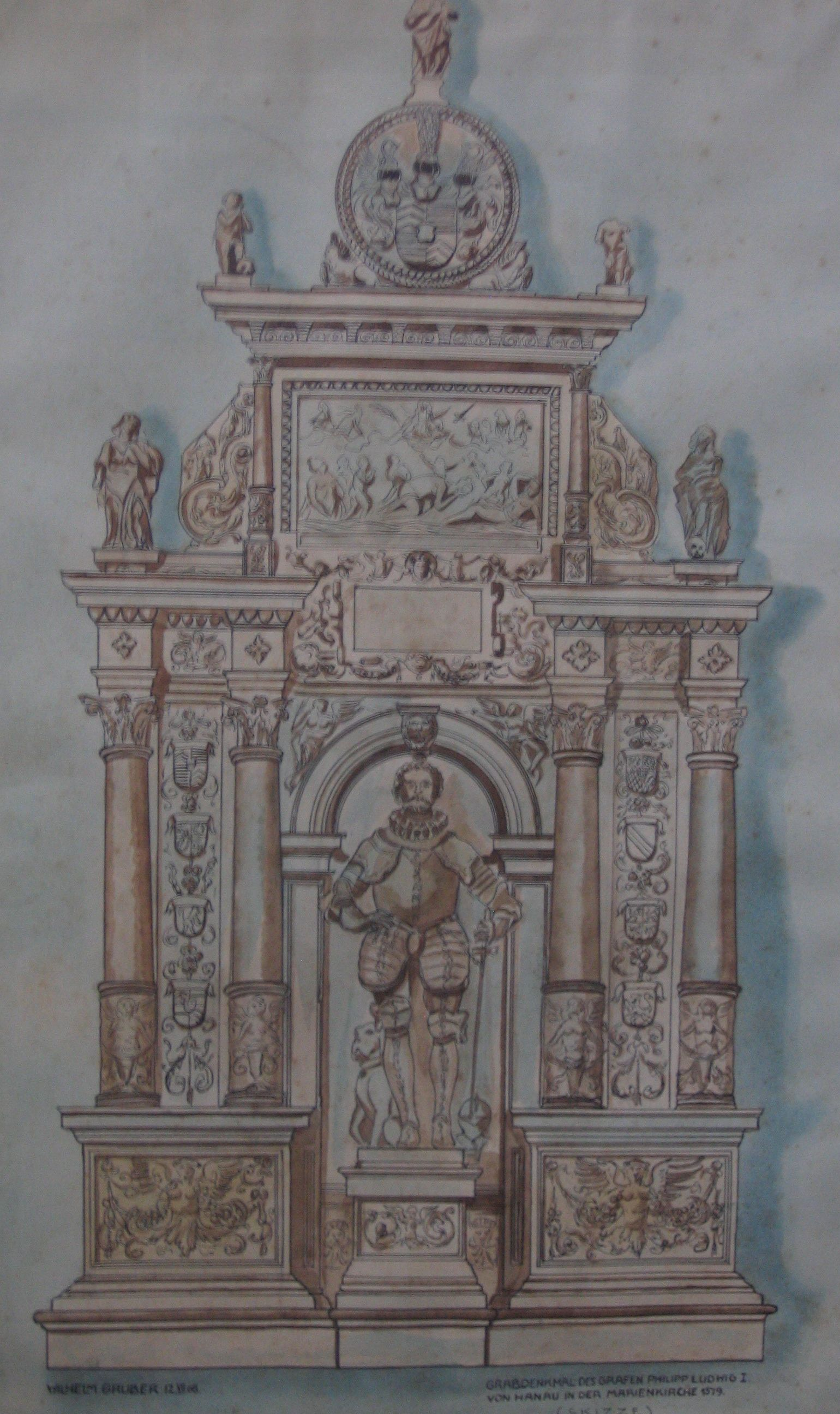
- Drawing by Karl Gruber of the grave monument of Count Philipp Ludwig I of Hanau-Münzenberg, that was destroyed during World War II
- Born: 21 November 1553
- Died: 4 February 1580 (aged 26)
- Buried: St. Mary's Church in Hanau
- Noble family: House of Hanau
- Spouse: Magdalene of Waldeck-Wildungen
- Issue Detail: Philip Louis II, Count of Hanau-Münzenberg; Albert, Count of Hanau-Münzenberg-Schwarzenfels
- Father: Philipp III, Count of Hanau-Münzenberg
- Mother: Countess Palatine Helena of Simmern

Philipp Ludwig I, Count of Hanau-Münzenberg (21 November 1553 – 4 February 1580) succeeded his father in the government of the County of Hanau-Münzenberg in 1561.

== Background ==
Philipp Ludwig I, was the son of Count Philipp III of Hanau-Münzenberg and Countess Palatine Helena of Simmern. His godparents were:

- Duchess Palatinate Maria of Simmern (1519–1567), daughter of the Margrave Casimir of Brandenburg-Kulmbach, married to Elector Friedrich III
- Count Philipp of Solms-Braunfels
- Count Ludwig of Stolberg-Königstein

His hobby was collecting coins and medals.

== Youth ==
=== Childhood ===
Nothing is known about his early years. In 1560, when he was seven years old, his father appointed him as bailiff of the district of Steinau. Presumably, this was a sinecure.

Just one year later, his father died and he inherited the county of Hanau-Münzenberg. A committee of regents was appointed to rule on his behalf.

=== Regency ===
The regency was established by the Reichskammergericht ("Imperial Supreme Court") at the request of his mother. Three regents were appointed, as requested:

- Count Johann VI of Nassau-Dillenburg, a step-great-uncle of the ward, who was also related directly to his ward
- Count Philipp IV of Hanau-Lichtenberg, the reigning Count of Hanau in the other line, and thus—very distantly—related to his ward.
- Elector Palatine Friedrich III is mentioned in the literature as the chief regent. There is, however, no documentary evidence that he acted as such.

Count Reinhard I of Solms, who had already acted as a guardian for Philipp Ludwig's father and who was more closely related to Philipp Ludwig, was apparently ignored when the regency was established. He had expected to be regent and had already accepted the homage of the subjects, whom he now had to release. The reason may have been that Reinhard was a Catholic and Hanau-Münzenberg had joined to Reformation religiously as well as politically. On the other hand, the contrast between Calvinism (as practised in the Electorate of the Palatinate) and Lutheranism (in Hanau-Lichtenberg) was not as pronounced at this time as it was a generation later, when again the Count of Hanau-Lichtenberg acted as regent for Hanau-Münzenberg and the difference it caused violent clashes within the regency. Under the regency for Philipp Ludwig I this was limited to discussions which education he should receive. In the end, the guardians reached an agreement.

=== Education ===
The young Count Philipp Ludwig I was described by his teachers as highly intelligent and eager to learn. From 1563 onwards, his guardians looked into the possibility of him being educated abroad. As this led to nothing, he stayed for three years at the court of his guardian in Dillenburg, where he was educated together with his guardian's youngest brother, Henry of Nassau-Dillenburg (1550–1574). From 1567 to 1569, they studied together at the University of Strasbourg and after 1569 at the University of Tübingen. Here, count Philipp Ludwig I came into contact with the fiercely unfolding theological controversy within the Protestant movement.

After a stay in Tübingen, the education continued in France. Count Philipp Ludwig I arrived in Paris in 1572. Here, he came into contact with Admiral Gaspard II de Coligny, the leader of Huguenots. He narrowly escaped the Saint Bartholomew's Day massacre and returned to Buchsweiler (now called Bouxwiller), the capital of the county of Hanau-Lichtenberg.

He continued his studies at the University of Basel, from where he also took excursions further into Switzerland. In 1573, he travelled to Italy and visited in the numerous places in northern Italy before reaching his destination, the University of Padua. He then continued to study in Rome. The return journey took him to Vienna in 1574. This educational program was quite extraordinary for a count.

=== Family ===
Count Philipp Ludwig I married Countess Magdalene of Waldeck-Wildungen (1558–1599). Sources differ on the exact date of the wedding: 2, 5 or 6 February 1576. His guardian opposed the marriage, because Magdalena was of lower rank than the Counts of Hanau, and her family held lands in Hesse and Cologne. He would have preferred a bride from a family closer to Hanau. He may have married her out of true love, or to counter the political dominance of Nassau over Hanau.

Philipp and Magdalena had four children together:

1. Philipp Ludwig II (18 November 1576 – 9 August 1612).
2. Juliane (13 October 1577 – 2 December 1577), buried in the choir of the St. Mary's Church in Hanau.
3. William (26 August 1578 – 14 June 1579), also buried in the choir of St. Mary's Church in Hanau.
4. Albert of Hanau-Münzenberg-Schwarzenfels (12 November 1579 – 19 December 1635).

== Government ==
On 13 November 1562 Emperor Ferdinand I passed the residence of Hanau on his way to the coronation of his son Maximilian II on 24 November 1562 in Frankfurt. Ferdinand was welcomed at court and Philipp Ludwig and Ferdinand went hunting together.

In 1563, a consistory was founded in Hanau, so that the Reformation was institutionalized administratively. The consistory was initially a department of the count's Chancery. Under his son, count Philipp Ludwig II, however, the authority of the church was legally separated as an independent institution in 1612.

In 1571, the Statutes of Solms were published, codifying the law as it stood in the County of Solms. This work had been commissioned by the Counts of Solms. Since the law in neighbouring territories was very similar, the work spread quickly in the area of the Wetterau Association of Imperial Counts. Local differences from the Solms statute were published as local notices. In the county of Hanau-Münzenberg this law code collection was used from 1581 (if not earlier) until the introduction of the Civil Code on 1 January 1900.

Count Philipp Ludwig I ruled the county autonomously from 1575. His government is characterized by careful maneuvering among the various confessions and the imperial territories in pursuit of consolidation and the web of political relations in the Empire and in the Wetterau region. In 1578 the Lutheran Church Order of Hanau-Lichtenberg was introduced in Hanau-Münzenberg as well. In this issue, Count Philipp Ludwig acted very carefully and did not follow, probably against his personal conviction, the more radical Calvinist model. His son and successor, Count Philipp Ludwig II, later carried through the so-called "second Reformation", the turn towards Calvinism.

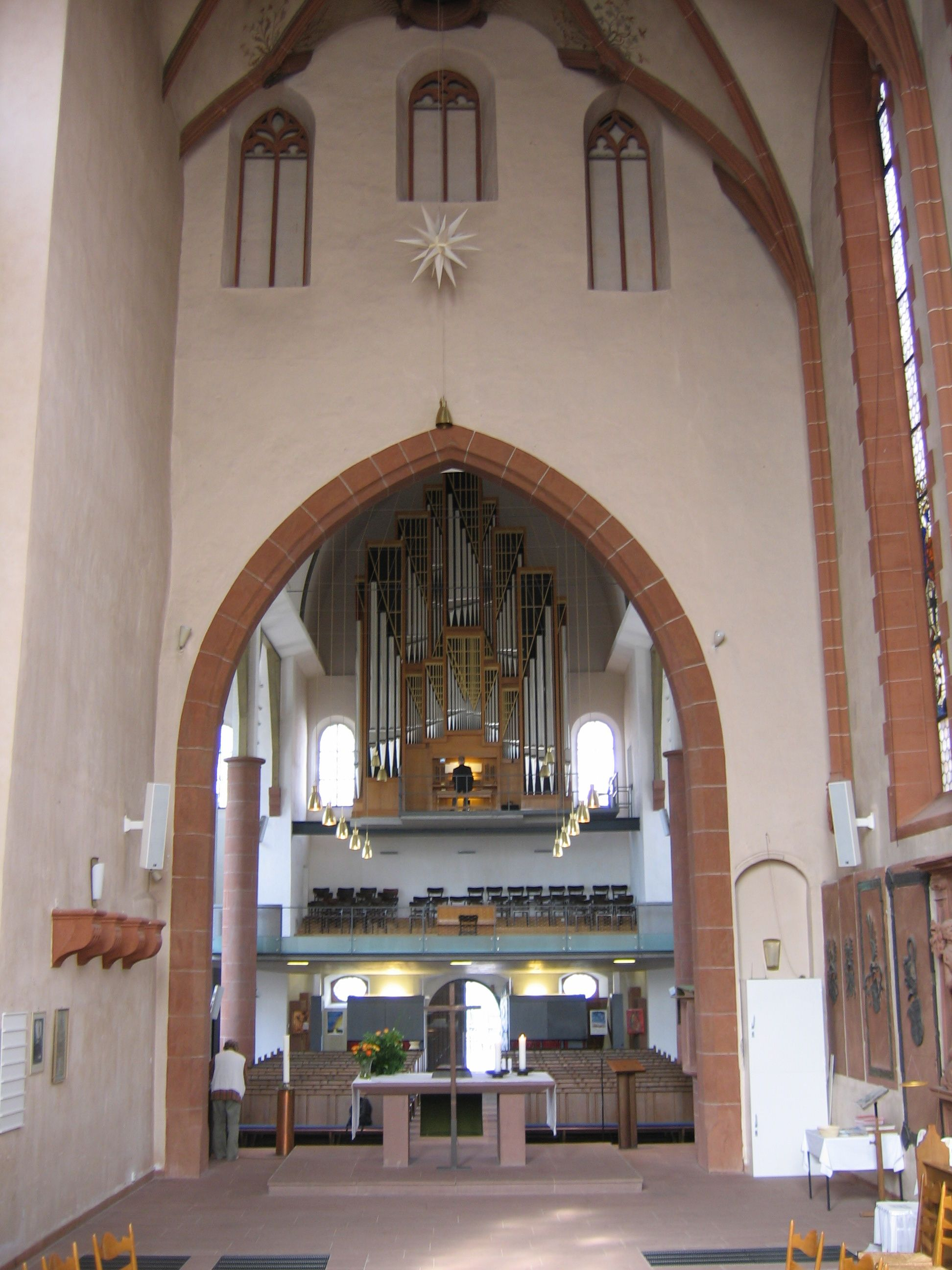
Choir of the St. Mary's Church in Hanau (foreground); the wall brackets which held the epitaph of Count Philipp Ludwig I before its destruction, can be seen on the left side. In the background the main nave of the church.

During Count Philipp Ludwig I's reign, Hanau could finally definitively purchase the villages of Dorheim, Schwalheim and Rödgen and the former monasteries Konradsdorf and Hirzenhain and one third of the district of Ortenberg from the Count of Stolberg. These areas had previously been pledged to Hanau. He also purchased Ober-Eschbach, Nieder-Eschbach, Steinbach and Holzhausen.

== Death ==
Count Philipp Ludwig I died quite suddenly. He had complained about weakness and nausea for three or four days before his death, but even Philipp Ludwig himself had not taken it very seriously. He fainted unexpectedly between 4 and 5 PM while gambling and died soon after.

He was buried in the choir of the St. Mary's Church in Hanau, on the right side, hence near the south wall of the choir, in the immediate vicinity of his father. A funeral sermon was published. An epitaph was mounted above his grave, which was considered a major example of High Renaissance art. The epitaph was destroyed during World War II, a few surviving fragments are kept in the Historical Museum of Hanau. The location of the epitaph on the south wall is indicated by four empty brackets.

His widow, Countess Magdalene, née of Waldeck, remarried in 1581, with John VII, Count of Nassau-Siegen.

== Ancestors ==
Ancestors of Philipp Ludwig I of Hanau-Münzenberg

8. Reinhard IV, Count of Hanau-Münzenberg (1473–1512)
4. Philipp II, Count of Hanau-Münzenberg (1501, 1529)
9. Katharina of Schwarzburg-Blankenburg (1470–1514)
2. Philipp III, Count of Hanau-Münzenberg (1526–1561)
10. Bodo VIII, Count of Stolberg-Wernigerode (1467–1538)
5. Juliana of Stolberg (1506–1580)
11. Anna of Eppstein-Königstein (1482–1538)
1. Philipp Ludwig I of Hanau-Münzenberg
12. Johann I, Count Palatine of Simmern (1459–1509)
6. Johann II, Count Palatine of Simmern (1492–1557)
13. Joan of Nassau-Saarbrücken (1464–1521)
3. Countess Palatine Helena of Simmern (1532–1579)
14. Christoph I, Margrave of Baden (1453–1527)
7. Beatrix of Baden (1492–1535)
15. Ottilie of Katzenelnbogen (1451–1517)

== References and sources ==
- Adrian Willem Eliza Dek: De afstammelingen van Juliana van Stolberg tot aan het jaar van de vrede van Munster, Zaltbommel, 1968.
- Reinhard Dietrich: Die Landesverfassung in dem Hanauischen, in: Hanauer Geschichtsblätter issue 34, Hanau 1996, ISBN 3-9801933-6-5.
- Rolf Glawischnig: Niederlande, Kalvinismus und Reichsgrafenstand 1559–1584. Nassau-Dillenburg unter Graf Johann VI, in: Schriften des Landesamtes für geschichtliche Landeskunde issue 36, Marburg, 1973.
- Hatstein, handwritten chronicle in the archives of the Hanauer Geschichtsverein.
- Carl Heiler: Johann Adam Bernhard's Bericht von der Jugendzeit des Grafen Philipp Ludwig I. von Hanau, in: Hanauisches Magazin issue 11, 1932, pp. 25–31.
- Heinrich Neumann: Eine gräfliche Reise vor mehr als 350 Jahren, in: Hanauisches Magazin issue 11, 1932, p. 92.
- Reinhards von Isenburg, Grafen zu Büdingen, an den jungen Grafen Philipp Ludwig in Anno 1563 den 6. Dec. selbst verfertigtes Consilium, sich vor und in der Regierung zu verhalten, partially in: Hanauisches Magazin issue 8, 1785, pp. 32–34.
- Hermann Kersting: Die Sonderrechte im Kurfürstenthume Hessen. Sammlung des Fuldaer, Hanauer, Isenburger, Kurmainzer und Schaumburger Rechts, einschließlich der Normen für das Buchische Quartier und für die Cent Mittelsinn, sowie der im Fürstenthume Hanau recipirten Hülfsrechte, Fulda, 1857.
- Gerhard Menk: Philipp Ludwig I. von Hanau-Münzenberg (1553–1580). Bildungsgeschichte und Politik eines Reichsgrafen in der zweiten Hälfte des 16. Jahrhunderts, in: Hessisches Jahrbuch für Landesgeschichte vol. 32, 1982, pp. 127–163.
- Georg Schmidt: Der Wetterauer Grafenverein, in: Veröffentlichungen der Historischen Kommission für Hessen, vol. 52, Marburg, 1989, ISBN 3-7708-0928-9.
- Reinhard Suchier: Genealogie des Hanauer Grafenhauses, in: Festschrift des Hanauer Geschichtsvereins zu seiner fünfzigjährigen Jubelfeier am 27. August 1894, Hanau, 1894.
- Johann Adolf Theodor Ludwig Varnhagen: Grundlage der Waldeckischen Landes- und Regentengeschichte, Arolsen 1853.
- K. Wolf: Die vormundschaftliche Regierung des Grafen Johann des Älteren von Nassau-Dillenburg, in: Hanauisches Magazin, issue 15, p. 81 and issue 16, p. 1.
- Ernst J. Zimmermann: Hanau Stadt und Land, third edition, Hanau, 1919, reprinted 1978.

== Footnotes ==
Philipp Ludwig I of Hanau-Münzenberg House of Hanau Born: 21 November 1553 Died: 4 February 1580
Preceded by Philipp III	Count of Hanau-Münzenberg; 1561–1580	Succeeded by Philipp Ludwig II
