= Maria of Hanau-Münzenberg =

- Born: 20 January 1562
- Died: 15 February 1605 (aged 43); Frankfurt
- Buried: Church of St. Mary in Hanau
- Noble family: House of Hanau
- Father: Philip III, Count of Hanau-Münzenberg
- Mother: Countess Palatine Helena of Simmern

Maria of Hanau-Münzenberg (20 January 1562 – 15 February 1605 in Frankfurt) was the youngest daughter of Count Philip III (1526–1561) and Countess Palatine Helena of Simmern (1532–1579). She was born after her father's death and remained unmarried.

As with many female members of aristocratic families of the period who did not belong to important royal houses, the research into her life has many gaps. A very incomplete picture of her life is known; only a few unusual facts, such as that she remained unmarried. This was unintended; her mother's relatives tried to arrange a marriage into the House of Wittelsbach for her in 1573.

== Life ==
In the fierce dispute between the regents of her nephew Count Philip Louis II and his brother Albert, which was mainly about whether their wards should be raised in the Calvinist of Lutheran faith, she supported the Lutheran side, which was represented by Count Philip IV of Hanau-Lichtenberg, and later by his son Philip V. The Lutheran side eventually lost.

She lived on her own in Hanau and this, along with her allegedly too expensive court, drew criticism from her opponents, led by Count Palatine John Casimir of Simmern, who was the regent of the Electorate of the Palatinate. Another criticism was that among her personnel were a midwife and the sister-in-law of an executioner. She was supported by the Lutheran Count Palatine Richard of Simmern-Sponheim, who tried to stem Calvinist offensive, together with the Counts of Hanau-Lichtenberg. As this conflict was not only about religion, but also about which member of the House of Hanau would act as regent for whom, Count Palatine John Casimir intervened immediately when Count Philip V of Hanau-Lichtenberg offered Maria accommodation in his castle in Babenhausen.

Maria died on 15 February 1605 in Frankfurt. The fact that she died in Frankfurt is a further indication that she led quite an independent life for a lady of her era. She was buried in the Church of St. Mary in Hanau.

== Ancestors ==
Ancestors of Maria of Hanau-Münzenberg

8. Reinhard IV, Count of Hanau-Münzenberg (1473-1512)
4. Philip II, Count of Hanau-Münzenberg (1501-1529)
9. Catherine of Schwarzburg-Blankenburg (1470-1514)
2. Philip III, Count of Hanau-Münzenberg (1526-1561)
10. Bodo VIII, Count of Stolberg-Wernigerode (1467-1538)
5. Juliana of Stolberg (1506-1580)
11. Anna of Eppstein-Königstein (1482-1538)
1. Maria of Hanau-Münzenberg
12. John I, Count Palatine of Simmern (1459-1509)
6. John II, Count Palatine of Simmern (1492-1557)
13. Joan of Nassau-Saarbrücken (1464-1521)
3. Countess Palatine Helena of Simmern (1532-1579)
14. Christopher I, Margrave of Baden (1453-1527)
7. Beatrix of Baden (1492-1535)
15. Ottilie of Katzenelnbogen (1451-1517)
