= Louis, Count of Stolberg =

German nobleman (1505–1574)

- Born: 12 January 1505; Stolberg
- Died: 1 September 1574 (aged 69); Wertheim
- Noble family: House of Stolberg
- Spouse: Walburga of Wied-Runkel
- Father: Bodo VIII, Count of Stolberg-Wernigerode
- Mother: Anna of Eppstein-Königstein

Count Louis of Stolberg (12 January 1505 in Stolberg – 1 September 1574 in Wertheim) was a German nobleman. He ruled Eppstein-Königstein from 1535 until his death.

== Life ==
Louis was born at Stolberg castle, as the son of Count Bodo VIII and his wife, Countess Anna of Eppstein-Königstein. He was their third son and the fourth of their twelve children. Among his siblings were Count Wolfgang, Abess Anna of Quedlinburg, Countess Juliana of Hanau-Münzenberg and later Nassau-Dillenburg, Count Henry of Stolberg-Wernigerode, Countess Catherine of Henneberg, Count Albert of Stolberg-Schwarza and Count Christopher of Stolberg-Gedern, who was provost at Halberstadt

From the age of nine, he was educated by his maternal uncle Eberhard IV of Eppstein in Königstein. Later, he studied at the University of Wittenberg, where he converted to Lutheranism in 1521. The expansion and consolidation of the Reformation became his main objective after his conversion. He acted as councillor to Emperor Charles V and his successors Ferdinand I and Maximilian II. He was frequently sent on diplomatic missions, inter alia to Queen Elizabeth I of England and to the Spanish court.

His maternal uncle Eberhard IV had no sons and made Louis his universal heir. From 1527, Louis acted as Eberhard's co-ruler. Emperor Charles V recognized Eberhard's will in 1528. In 1535, Eberhard died and Louis inherited his possessions. In 1540, he introduced the Reformation in his territory. However, he did not participate in the Schmalkaldic War.

== Marriage and issue ==
Louis married Walburga of Wied (died 1578), the daughter of John III of Wied (died 1533) and Elisabeth of Nassau-Dillenburg (1488–1559). Together, they had a son and three daughters:

- Catherine, married Michael III, Count of Wertheim, the last Count of Wertheim. When Michael III died in 1556 without a male heir, Louis managed to acquire the County of Wertheim and Wertheim Castle, and a 50% share of Breuburg Castle and the Lordship of Breuberg. Catherine remarried in 1566, to Count Philip II of Eberstein (1523–1589).
- Elisabeth, married Count Dietrich of Manderscheid-Virneburg. He died in 1593 and a year later, she remarried to Baron William of Criechingen.
- Bodo, was educated at the court of the Duke of Bavaria. In 1568, he moved to Quedlinburg. He died before his father.
- Anna (13 April 1548 – 2 November 1599), married on 2 September 1566 to Count Louis III of Löwenstein-Wertheim (17 February 1530 – 13 March 1611).

== His heirs ==
As Louis had no surviving male heir, the County of Königstein fell to his younger brother Christopher. Louis' widow Walburga received the city, district, and winery of Butzbach as her Wittum

The Electorate of Mainz annexed the district of Königstein after Christopher died childless in 1581. The Counts of Stolberg inherited the districts of Ortenberg and Gedern and shares of Butzbach and Münzenberg. In 1598, his son-in-law Louis III won a dispute over the County of Wertheim that had lasted for 20 years.
