= Dorothea of Hanau-Münzenberg =

- Born: 4 February 1556
- Died: 5 September 1638 (aged 82)
- Noble family: House of Hanau
- Spouses: Anton of Ortenburg m. 1571 - wid. 1573; Volrad of Gleichen-Kranichfeld-Ehrenstein-Blankenhain m. 1585 - div. 1596
- Father: Philip III, Count of Hanau-Münzenberg
- Mother: Countess Palatine Helena of Simmern

Countess Dorothea of Hanau-Münzenberg (4 February 1556 – 5 September 1638), was a German noblewoman member of the House of Hanau by birth and by virtue of her two marriages Countess of Ortenburg and Gleichen-Kranichfeld-Ehrenstein-Blankenhain.

== Life ==
She was a daughter of Count Philip III of Hanau-Münzenberg and Countess Palatine Helena of Simmern.

On 15 June 1571 Dorothea married with Count Anton of Ortenburg (5 September 1530 – 23 May 1573), a member of the Aulic Council and governor of Heidenheim on behalf of Württemberg and son of Count Joachin of Ortenburg, who with his ally Frederick III, Elector Palatine established the Protestantism in his domains against the adjacent Roman Catholic Duchy of Bavaria ruled by Albert V. This marriage, in consequence, strengthened the Protestant cause in Germany and indirectly was seen as a threat to Bavaria. Moreover, Dorothea had a dowry of 10,000 florins, huge amount needed by the Ortenburg family who was short of money at that time because of their fight against Bavaria and the Aulic Council expenses of Anton caused considerable additional costs. Once betrothed, Anton and Dorothea where summoned at the court of the Elector Palatine in Heidelberg in May 1570, where the groom arrived from the Diet of Speyer. The wedding ceremony took place at Ortenburg Castle, followed by four days of festivities who costed 8,000 florins.

Anton died on 23 May 1573, leaving his wife pregnant. Seven months later, on 1 December 1573, Dorothea gave birth a son, Frederick, who only lived four days.

After the death of her husband and newborn son, the 17-year-old widow wanted to return with her family in Hanau. The financial settlement of this matter was slow. Only in 1575 Dorothea was able to leave Ortenburg, although the dispute continued until 1582. According to her father, this conflict cost him 23,000 guilders.

On 28 November 1585 Dorothea married with Count Volrad of Gleichen-Kranichfeld-Ehrenstein-Blankenhain (4 March 1556 – 8 March 1627), who was a student at University of Jena during 1573-1576. They had five children. Dorothea's second marriage ended in divorce in 1596. She never remarried.

Dorothea died on 5 September 1638. At her funeral, a funeral sermon was published.

== Issue ==
- A daughter (baptized on 3 March 1587 in Blankenhain – d. before 1623).
- A daughter (baptized on 18 February 1588 in Blankenhain – d. before 1623).
- Dorothea Susanne (d. 1638), heiress of Blankenhain and Kranichfeld; married on 1. November 1619 to Baron George of Mörsperg and Beffort (d. 1648).
- Anna Elisabeth (d. young).
- Frederick William (d. 1599).

== Ancestors ==
Ancestors of Dorothea of Hanau-Münzenberg

8. Reinhard IV, Count of Hanau-Münzenberg (1473-1512)
4. Philip II, Count of Hanau-Münzenberg (1501-1529)
9. Catherine of Schwarzburg-Blankenburg (1470-1514)
2. Philip III, Count of Hanau-Münzenberg (1526-1561)
10. Bodo VIII, Count of Stolberg-Wernigerode (1467-1538)
5. Juliana of Stolberg (1506-1580)
11. Anna of Eppstein-Königstein (1482-1538)
1. Dorothea of Hanau-Münzenberg
12. John I, Count Palatine of Simmern (1459-1509)
6. John II, Count Palatine of Simmern (1492-1557)
13. Joan of Nassau-Saarbrücken (1464-1521)
3. Countess Palatine Helena of Simmern (1532-1579)
14. Christopher I, Margrave of Baden (1453-1527)
7. Beatrix of Baden (1492-1535)
15. Ottilie of Katzenelnbogen (1451-1517)
