= County of Königstein =

The County of Königstein was an imperially immediate territory of the Holy Roman Empire within the Upper Rhenish Circle.

== House of Eppstein ==
On 6 August 1505 Maximilian I granted the titles of lords of Königstein, Eppstein and Munzenberg to the brothers Eberhard, George and Philip, all from the house of Eppstein. However, all three of them remained without male issue and so their sister Anna's son was made heir to all three of them - Anna had married Botho of Stolberg. After the imperial register of 1521, the counts of Königstein were to provide four cavalrymen and thirteen foot soldiers in case of war.

== House of Stolberg ==
After Eberhard IV of Eppstein died on 25 May 1535, the county was inherited by his heir Louis of Stolberg, who had served as co-ruler with his uncle Eberhard as early as 1527. He introduced the Protestant Reformation to the county, reorganizing the church along the same lines as Wolfgang, Count Palatine of Zweibrücken, although Marienschloss Abbey successfully held out against it. Louis died without male issue and so his brother Christoph of Stolberg inherited the county but he was its last lord, dying on 5 August 1581. After this Daniel Brendel von Homburg, Elector of Mainz, stated that his brother Albrecht Georg of Stolberg was considered the county as his fiefdom, as a proxy of Rudolf II and that Mainz should act as imperial commissary for the lordship of Königstein. This promoted Königstein into an 'oberamt'. The counts of Stolberg complained to the Reichskammergericht over the issue and although it ceased to be a separately-ruled entity, it nominally existed until 1806 and the Act of Confederation, which abolished it and assigned it and Gedern to the Grand Duchy of Hesse.

== See also ==
- Königstein im Taunus

== Bibliography ==
- Jörg Brückner: Zwischen Reichsstandschaft und Standesherrschaft (PDF-Datei; 3,89 MB). Die Grafen zu Stolberg und ihr Verhältnis zu den Landgrafen von Thüringen und späteren Herzögen, Kurfürsten bzw. Königen von Sachsen (1210 bis 1815), Dissertation TU Chemnitz 2003.
- Karl Wolf: Die Besitzergreifung der Grafschaft Königstein durch Kurmainz i. J. 1581 und der Wetterauer Grafenverein, in: Jahrbuch des Vereins für nassauische Altertumskunde und Geschichtsforschung 74, 1963, S. 70 ff.
- Beate Großmann-Hofmann, Hans-Curt Köster: Königstein im Taunus: Geschichte und Kunst; Königstein (Verlag Langewiesche), 2010; ISBN 978-3-7845-0778-1
