= Countess Palatine Helena of Simmern =

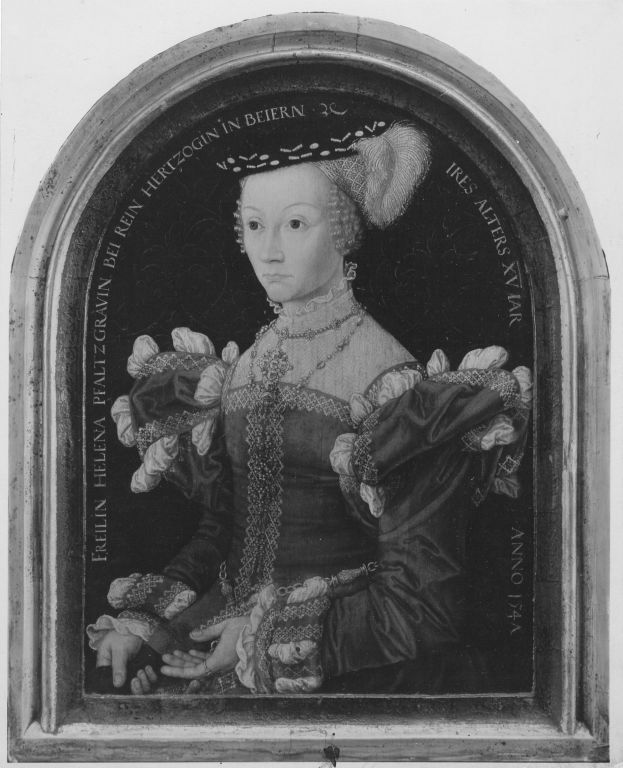
- Helena of Simmern by Hans Besser
- Born: 13 June 1532
- Died: 5 February 1579 (aged 46); Schwarzenfels Castle
- Noble family: House of Wittelsbach
- Spouse: Philip III, Count of Hanau-Münzenberg
- Father: John II, Count Palatine of Simmern
- Mother: Beatrice of Baden

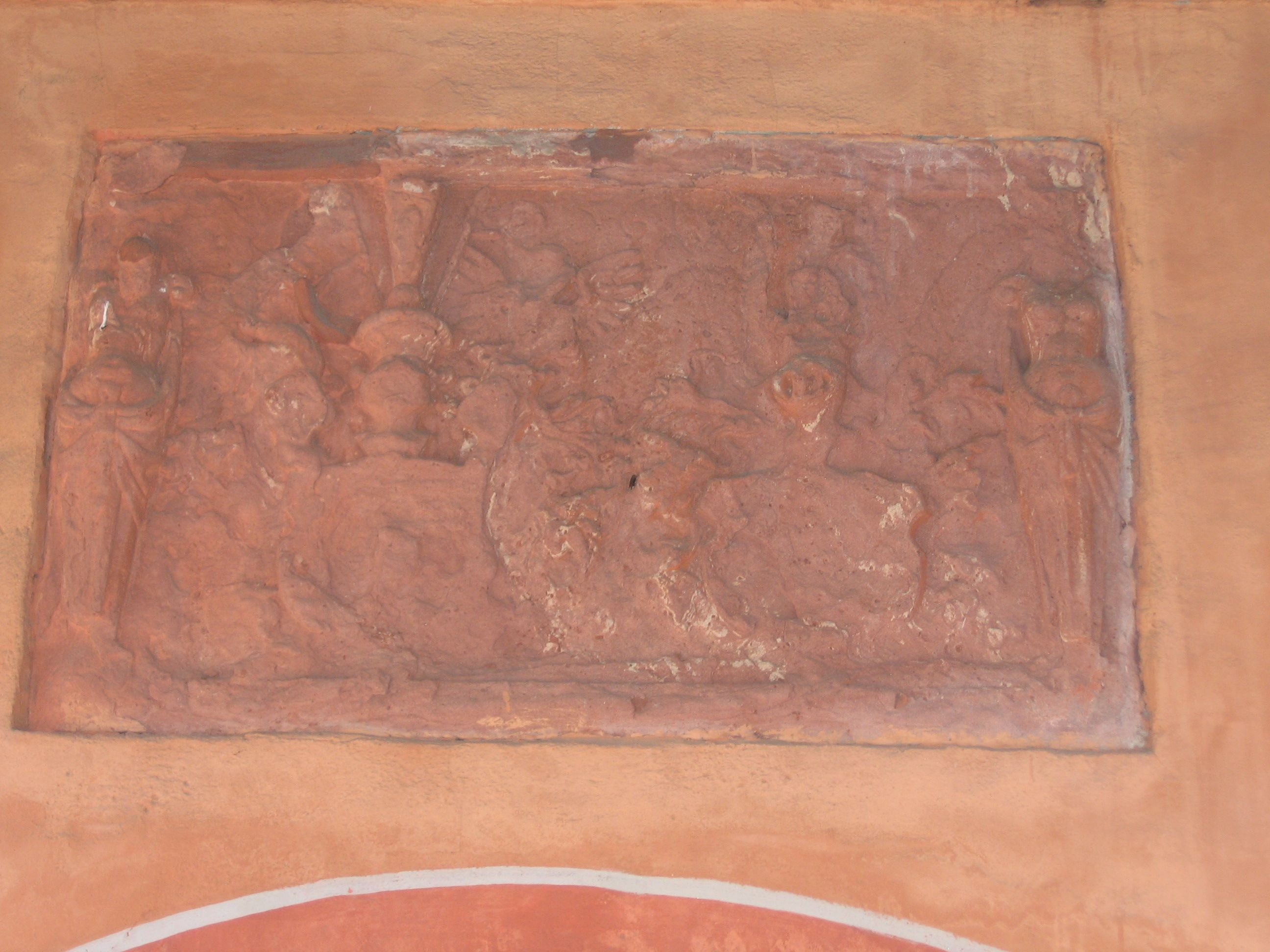
St. Mary's Church Hanau, coats of arms of Count Philip III and countess Helena at the Church of St. Mary in Hanau. It has suffered severe environmental damage

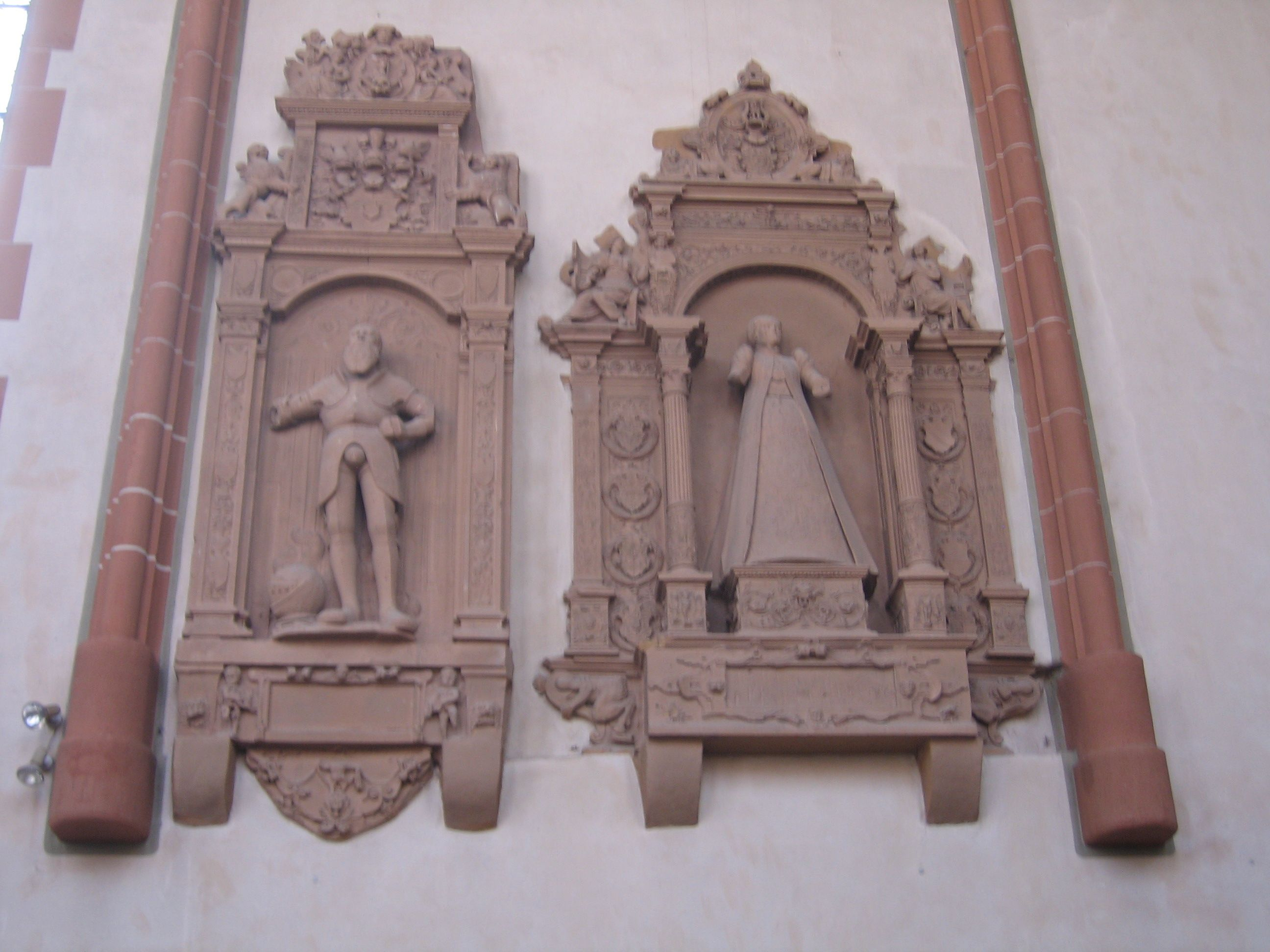
Epitaph of Count Philip III of Hanau-Münzenberg and his wife, Helena of Simmern, in St. Mary's Church in Hanau

Countess Palatine Helena of Simmern (13 June 1532 – 5 February 1579 at Schwarzenfels Castle in Sinntal ) was the daughter of Count Palatine and Duke John II of Simmern and his wife, Margravine Beatrice of Baden. She was Countess of Hanau-Münzenberg by marriage.

== Marriage and issue ==
On 22 November 1551, Helena married Count Philip III of Hanau-Münzenberg (1526–1561). Their combined coat of arms can be seen at the main entrance of the Church of St. Mary in Hanau. However, due to environmental factors, the stone has weathered and is in poor condition.

Philip and Helena had five children:

1. Philip Louis I (21 November 1553 – 4 February 1580)
2. Dorothea (1556 – 1638)
3. Reinhard William (28 September 1557 in Hanau – 17 February 1558) he was buried in the choir of the St. Mary's Church in Hanau.
4. John Philip (6 November 1559 – 22 April 1560), also buried in the choir of St. Mary's Church in Hanau
5. Maria (1562 – 1605), born posthumously, died unmarried.

== Widowhood ==
After the early death of her husband, she initiated the proceedings before the Supreme Court to establish the guardianship of her son Philip Louis I, who was still a minor. She was not appointed as guardian herself.

Initially, she used Steinau Castle as her widow seat; later she moved to Schwarzenfels Castle, where she died. After her death, her body was transferred to Hanau in a lead coffin, and buried in the Church of St. Mary, next to her husband.
