= Philipp III of Hanau-Münzenberg =

Count of Hanau-Münzenberg (1526–1561)

Philipp III, Count of Hanau-Münzenberg
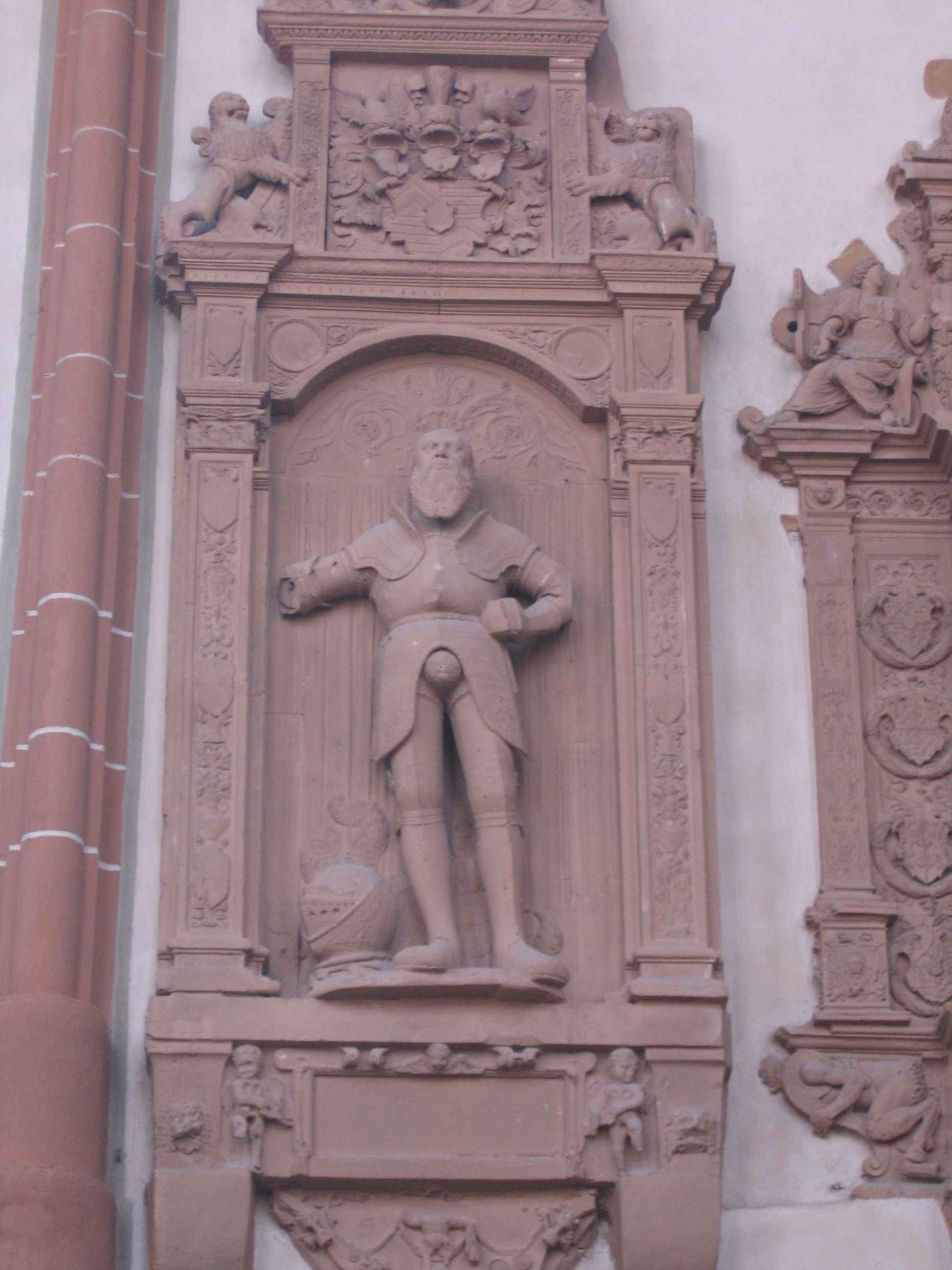
- Epitaph of Philipp III in the St. Mary's Church in Hanau
- Born: 30 November 1526
- Died: 14 November 1561 (aged 34)
- Noble family: House of Hanau
- Spouse: Countess Palatine Helena of Simmern
- Father: Philipp II, Count of Hanau-Münzenberg
- Mother: Juliana of Stolberg

Count Phillip III of Hanau-Münzenberg (30 November 1526 – 14 November 1561) ruled the County of Hanau-Münzenberg from 1529 until his death.

== Life ==
Philipp III was the second son of Philipp II (born: 17 August 1501; died: 28 March 1529) and his wife, Countess Juliana of Stolberg (born: 15 February 1506; died: 18 June 1580). Philipp III's elder brother died young; Philipp III was only three years old when he inherited the county. His mother and relatives petitioned the Reichskammergericht to establish a regency council. The council consisted of:

- Countess Juliana of Stolberg, Philipp III's mother
- Count William "the Rich" of Nassau-Siegen. He was Philipp's first cousin twice removed (a grandson of John IV, Count of Nassau-Siegen, Philipp's great-great-grandfather). He married Philipp's mother during the regency.
- Count Balthasar of Hanau-Münzenberg, Philipp's uncle (a younger brother of Philipp II). He appears to have done most of the work in the council, however, he died in 1534.
- Count Reinhard I of Solms-Hohensolms-Lich, Philipp's first cousin once removed.

There was a problem: Philipp II had demanded that his younger brother Balthasar would waive his claims on Hanau-Münzenberg before he could become a regent. A deed to this effect had been prepared, but Philipp II had died before he could seal the deed. It was argued that this deed was not legally valid, because it had not been sealed, and that Balthasar therefore had a claim to rule Hanau-Münzenberg himself and that this potential claim stood in the way of his becoming a regent. This problem was resolved by arguing that Philipp II, by not sealing the deed before his death, had implicitly withdrawn his demand.

Philipp III and his younger brother Reinhard of Hanau-Münzenberg studied at the universities of Mainz and Ingolstadt. They then made a Grand Tour to Antwerp, Mechelen, Leuven, Brussels, Breda and Strasbourg and then to Buchsweiler (now: Bouxwiller in France), the "capital" of Hanau-Lichtenberg, where they visited their relatives. From Buchsweiler, they travelled to France, where they studied at Orléans and Bourges.

== Reign ==
=== Reformation ===
During his reign — in fact, while the regency council was ruling on his behalf — the Reformation took hold in the County of Hanau-Münzenberg. Among his regency council, his uncle Balthasar was supporting the reformation, while Count Reinhard I of Solms-Lich-Hohensolms was opposed to it. Initially, the reformation was introduced gradually: when church staff retired, their successor would be a Lutheran. As early as 1523, the pastor Adolf Arborgast was included in the chapter of the St. Mary's church. When he was appointed, he explained that he wanted to spend little effort on vespers and the daily mass, but would instead concentrate on his sermons and putting forward the Gospel. The real reformer of Hanau was his successor Philipp Neunheller MA; during his time in office, the new faith gained more and more ground. The Catholic faith was never officially banned. The number of Catholic priests steadily decreased, as they were not replaced when they retired.

=== Ruling on his own ===
In 1544, Count Philipp was declared an adult, although he was only 18 years old and the age of consent was 25 under the Jus commune. Apparently, his guardians wanted to liberate themselves from this annoying task, even if they still had to act as guardians for Philipp's younger brother Reinhard.

In 1561, Count Philipp III purchased Naumburg Castle, the former Naumburg Abbey in Wetterau, including the Jus patronatus of Bruchköbel, Oberissigheim and Kesselstadt, villages within the county of Hanau-Münzenberg.

During his reign, the renovation of Hanau City Castle and the construction of Fortress Hanau were completed. He also paid the imperial tax for the Turkish War.

=== Inheriting Rieneck ===
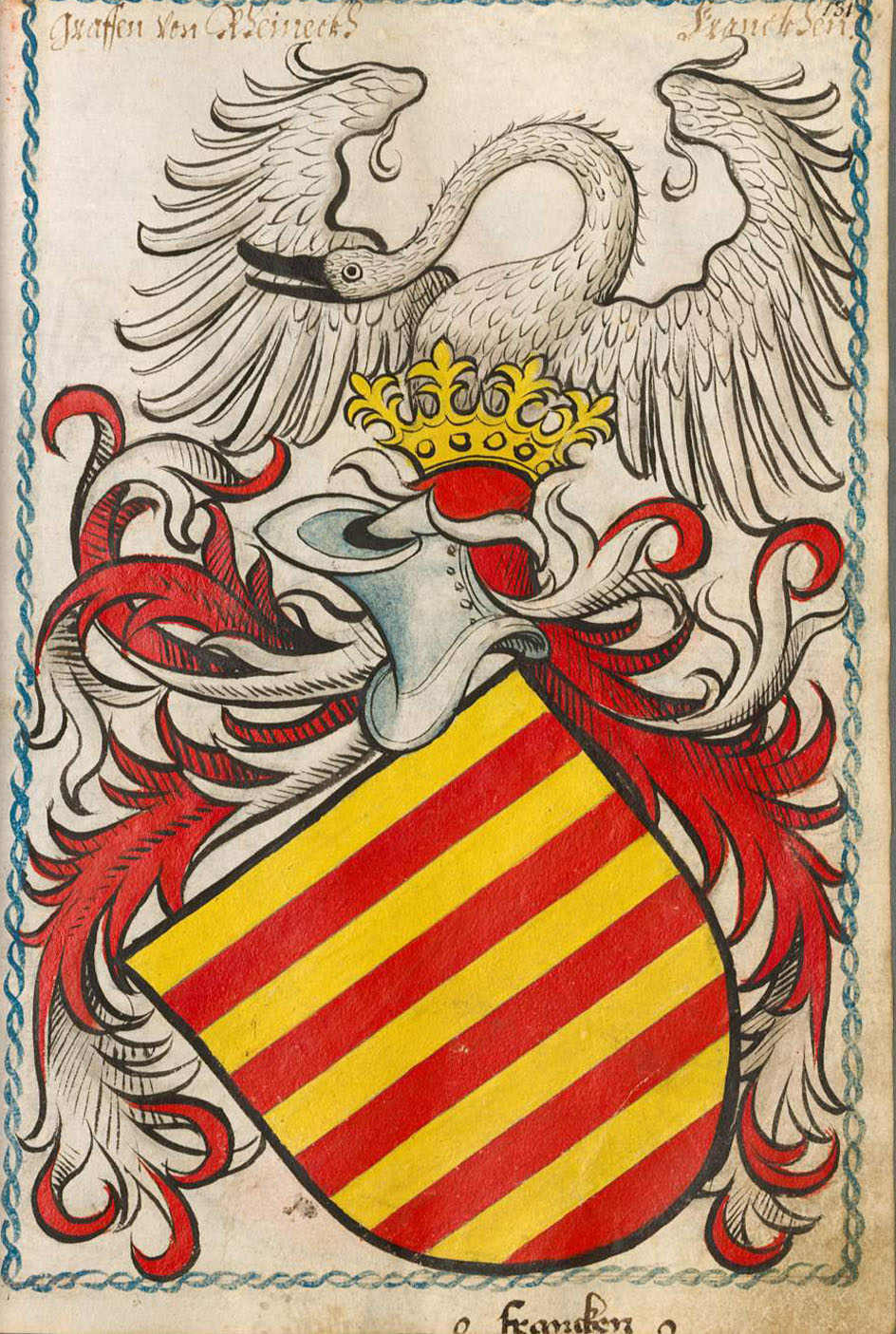
Coat of arms of Rieneck, after Scheibler's armorial 1450–1480

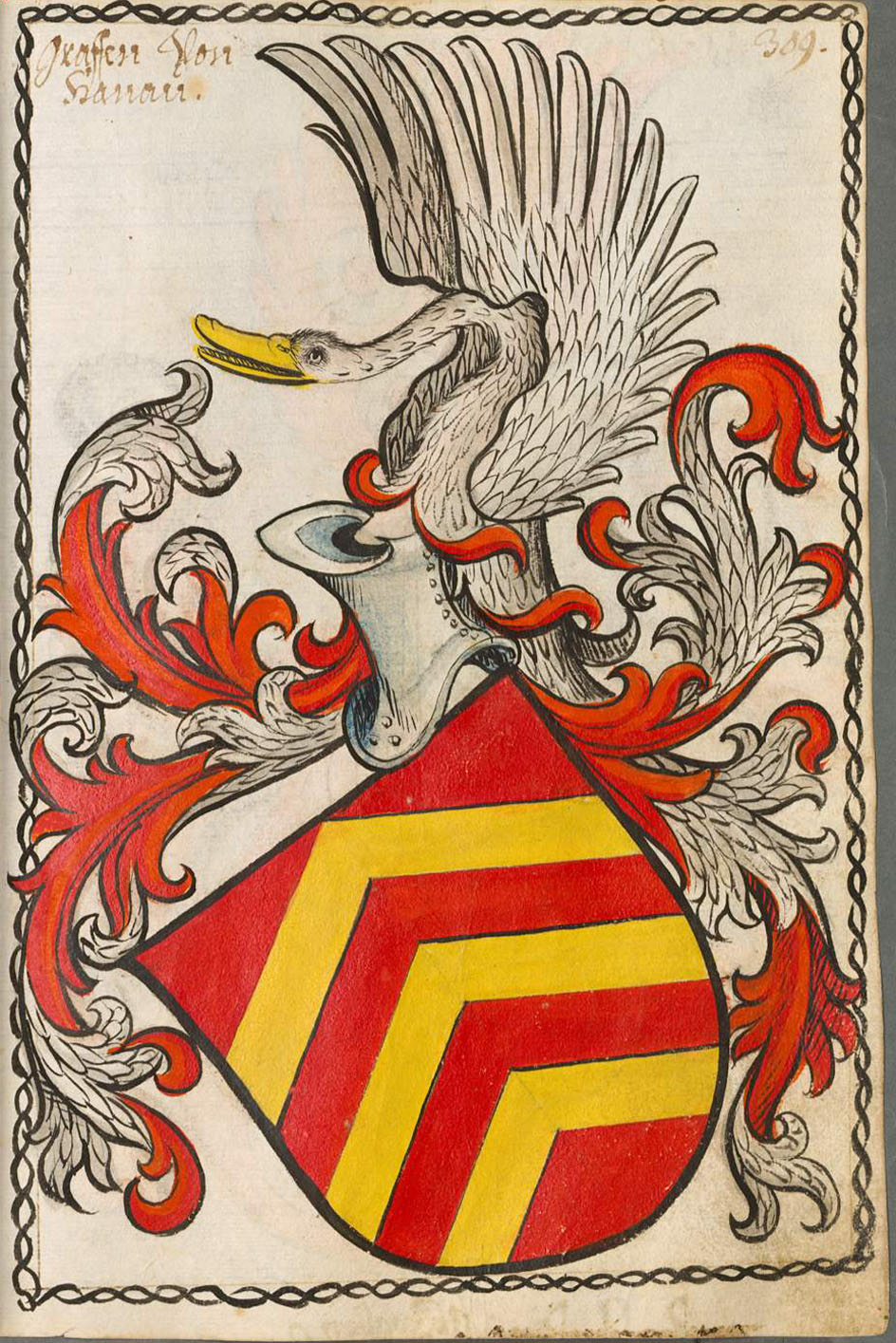
Coat of arms of the Lords and Counts of Hanau, after Scheibler's armorial

Count Philipp III of Rieneck co-operated closely with Count Philipp III of Hanau-Münzenberg on the issue of the Reformation and on other issues. As it was foreseeable that the Count of Rienieck would die without a male heir, he asked Emperor Karl V for permission to bequeath Rieneck to Hanau. Permission was granted in 1555. One argument used for this permission was the similarity between the coats of arms of Rieneck and Hanau, which suggested that they had from a common ancestor, which was actually not the case.

Since Emperor Karl V abdicated in the same year, Count Philipp III of Hanau-Münzenberg attempted to ask his successor Emperor Ferdinand I to confirm the permission at the Diet of Augsburg of 1558. He had, however, forgotten to bring the charter sealed by Karl, to that Ferdinand could not confirm it. Philipp III of Rieneck died on 3 September 1559, before this error could be corrected. His territory fell back to the Archbishopric of Mainz and the Bishopric of Würzburg. Philipp III of Hanau could only inherit the coat of arms and the title of "Count of Rieneck".

== Death ==
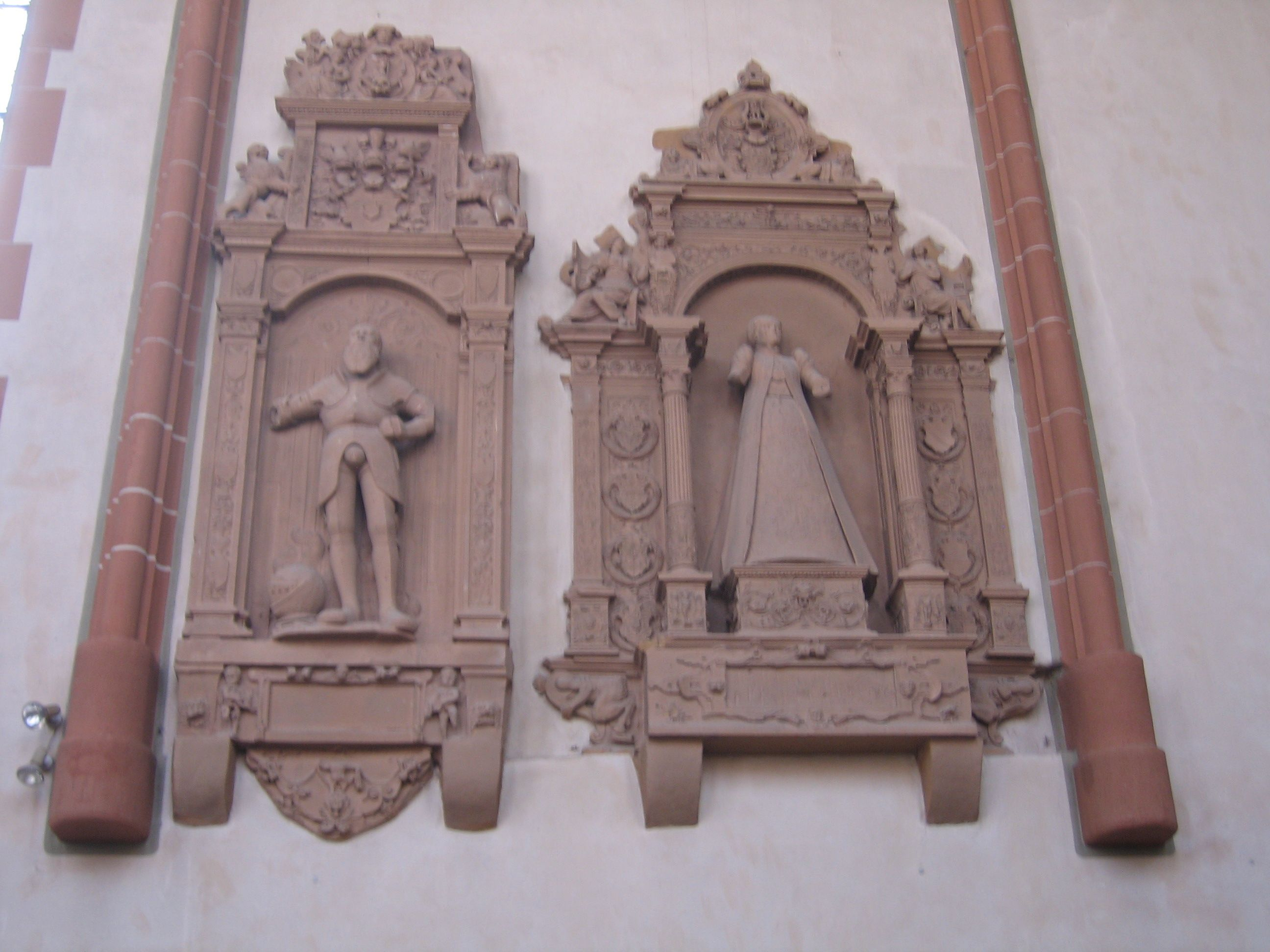
Epitaph of Count Philipp III of Hanau-Münzenberg and his wife, Countess Palatine Helene of Simmern, in the St. Mary's Church in Hanau

Count Philipp III died on 14 November 1561 after six years of illness and was buried before the high altar of the St. Mary's Church in Hanau on the right side. Two Renaissance epitaphs, for Philipp and his wife, were created by Johann von Trarbach and mounted on the southern wall of the choir. These epitaphs were preserved until this day.

The Counts of Hanau-Münzenberg usually died between the ages of 20 and 40, leaving an underage son as their successor. Presumably, they suffered from some hereditary disease - which disease is unknown. Nine successive counts died of a disease before the age of 40; this is unlikely to be a coincidence.

== Marriage and issue ==
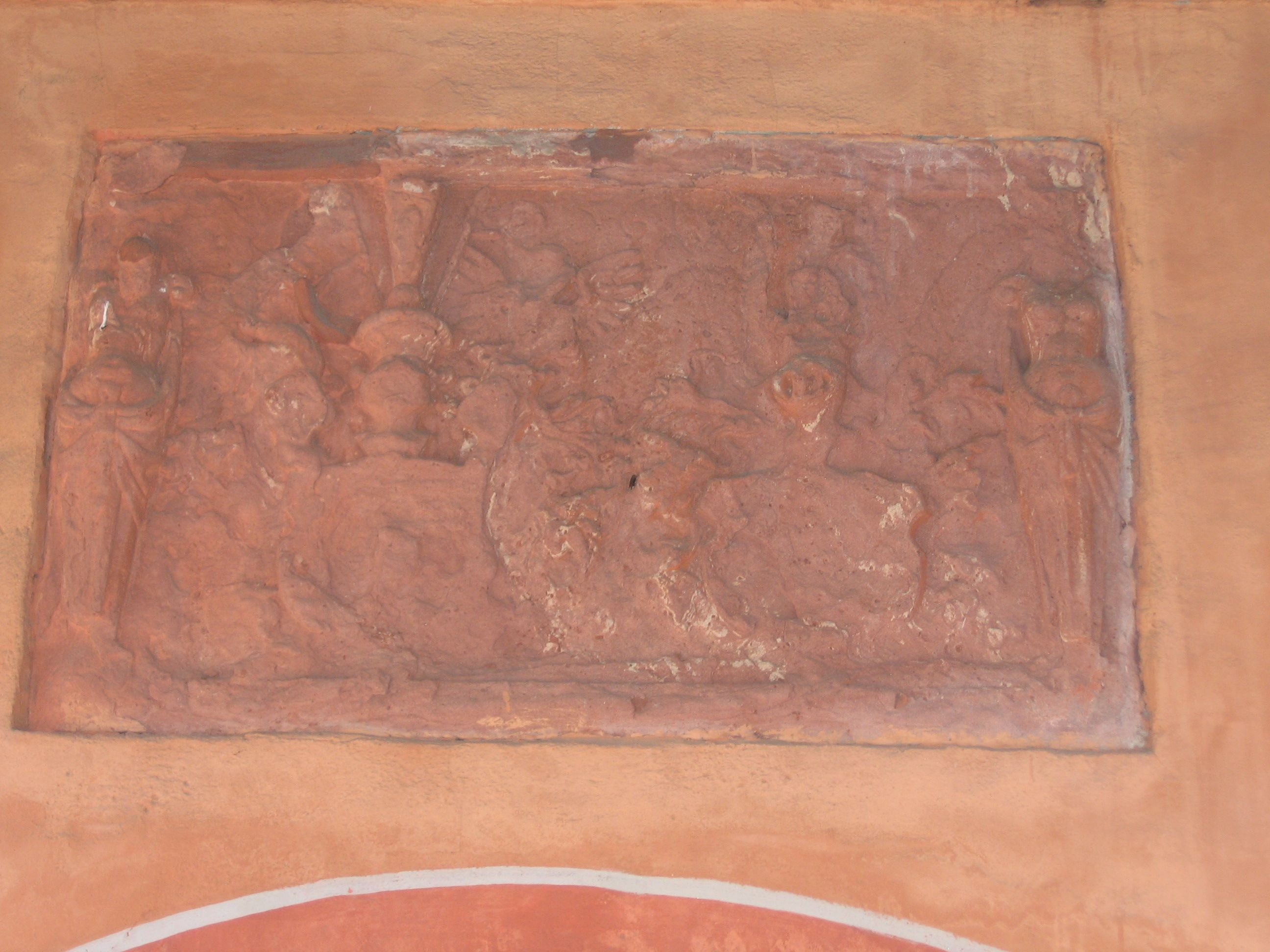
Coats of arms of Count Philipp III and countess palatine Helena in the St. Mary's Church in Hanau with severe environmental damage

On 22 November 1551 Count Philipp III married Countess Palatine Helena of Simmern. They had five children:

1. Philipp Ludwig I (21 November 1553 – 4 February 1580).
2. Dorothea (4 February 1556 – September 1638), married firstly Count Anton of Oldenburg and secondly Count Volrad of Gleichen-Kranichfeld-Ehrenstein-Blankenhain.
3. Reinhard Wilhelm (28 September 1557 – 17 February 1558); he was buried in the choir of the St. Mary's Church in Hanau.
4. Johann Philipp (6 November 1559 – 22 April 1560), also buried in the choir of St. Mary's Church in Hanau
5. Maria (20 January 1562 – 15 February 1605), born posthumously, died unmarried.

The coats of arms of Count Philipp III and Countess Palatine Helena of Simmern can be seen at the main entrance to St. Mary's Church in Hanau — unfortunately, due to environmental weathering, they are in a poor condition.

== Ancestors ==
Ancestors of Philipp III of Hanau-Münzenberg

8. Philipp I, Count of Hanau-Münzenberg (1449–1500)
4. Reinhard IV, Count of Hanau-Münzenberg (1473–1512)
9. Adriana of Nassau-Siegen (1449–1477)
2. Philipp II, Count of Hanau-Münzenberg (1501–1529)
10. Günther XXXVIII of Schwarzburg-Blankenburg (1450–1484)
5. Katharina of Schwarzburg-Blankenburg (1470–1514)
11. Katharina of Querfurt (d. 1521)
1. Philipp III of Hanau-Münzenberg
12. Heinrich the Elder of Stolberg (1436–1511)
6. Bodo VIII, Count of Stolberg-Wernigerode (1467–1538)
13. Mathilde of Mansfeld (d. 1468)
3. Juliana of Stolberg (1506–1580)
14. Philipp I of Eppstein-Königstein (1459–1481)
7. Anna of Eppstein-Königstein (1482–1538)
15. Countess Ludovika of Mark (d. 1499)

== Footnotes ==
Philipp III of Hanau-Münzenberg House of Hanau Born: 30 November 1526 Died: 14 November 1561
Preceded by Philipp II	Count of Hanau-Münzenberg; 1529–1561	Succeeded by Philipp Ludwig I
