= Anna III, Abbess of Quedlinburg =

Anna of Stolberg
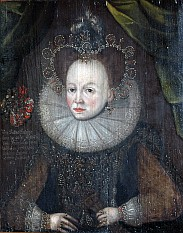

Princess-Abbess of Quedlinburg
- Reign: 1584-1601
- Predecessor: Elisabeth II
- Successor: Maria
- Born: 3 April 1565
- Died: 12 May 1601 (aged 36)
- House: Stolberg
- Father: Henry of Stolberg
- Mother: Elisabeth of Gleichen

Anna III, also known as Anna of Stolberg (3 April 1565 – 12 May 1601) was Princess-Abbess of Quedlinburg from 1584 until her death.

Anna was the daughter of Count Henry of Stolberg (1509–1572) and his wife, Elisabeth of Gleichen (died 1578).

Anna III was elected to succeed Elisabeth II, Abbess of Quedlinburg. The election of the new princess-abbess was confirmed by Holy Roman Emperor Rudolf II. She frequently confronted Quedlinburg city council and the city patron, Christian I, Elector of Saxony, and appealed to the Emperor for support.

Elector Christian I died in 1591 and was succeeded by Elector Christian II under the regency of Frederick William I, Duke of Saxe-Weimar. The Princess-Abbess selected Anne Margaret of Brunswick-Harburg as her coadjutrix but the Duke of Saxe-Weimar refused to consent as he wanted his own sister, Maria, to succeed Anna III.

Anna III died suddenly aged 36 after a walk. The official cause of her death was stroke. She was succeeded by Maria, Abbess of Quedlinburg.

Anna III House of Stolberg
Regnal titles
Preceded by Elisabeth II	Princess-Abbess of Quedlinburg; 1584–1601	Succeeded by Maria
