= Dorothea, Abbess of Quedlinburg =

Princess-Abbess of Quedlinburg (1591–1617)

Princess Dorothea of Saxony
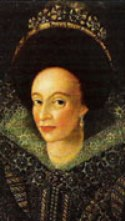

Princess-Abbess of Quedlinburg
- Reign: 19 July 1610 - 17 November 1617
- Predecessor: Maria, Abbess of Quedlinburg
- Successor: Dorothea Sophia, Abbess of Quedlinburg
- Born: 7 January 1591; Dresden, Germany
- Died: 17 November 1617 (aged 26); Dresden, Germany
- Burial: Freiberg
- House: Wettin
- Father: Christian I, Elector of Saxony
- Mother: Sophie of Brandenburg

Princess Dorothea of Saxony (7 January 1591 - 17 November 1617) reigned as Princess-Abbess of Quedlinburg from 1610 until her death.

Dorothea was born in Dresden to Christian I, Elector of Saxony, and his wife, Princess Sophie of Brandenburg. Her baptism was notably held without the customary exorcism.

== Reign ==
On 18 April 1610, Dorothea was elected successor of Princess-Abbess Maria of Quedlinburg. Vogt and patron of the abbey-principality at the time was Dorothea's brother, Christian II, Elector of Saxony. Emperor Rudolf II confirmed her election on 19 July.

Dorothea's relatively short reign was uneventful. She granted additional rights to the town of Quedlinburg and raised the income of preachers and teachers.

The 26-year-old Princess-Abbess died suddenly in Dresden during a visit to her brother. She was buried in Freiberg. As she had not selected her coadjutrix, the chapter elected Duchess Dorothea Sophia of Saxe-Altenburg.

Dorothea House of Wettin
Regnal titles
Preceded by Maria	Princess-Abbess of Quedlinburg; 1610–1617	Succeeded by Dorothea Sophia
