= Maria, Abbess of Quedlinburg =

Princess-Abbess of Quedlinburg, Germany, from 1601 to 1610

Duchess Maria of Saxe-Weimar
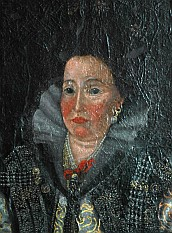

Princess-Abbess of Quedlinburg
- Reign: 1601–7 March 1610
- Predecessor: Anna III, Abbess of Quedlinburg
- Successor: Dorothea, Abbess of Quedlinburg
- Born: 7 October 1571; Weimar
- Died: 7 March 1610 (aged 38); Halle, Saxony-Anhalt
- Burial: Quedlinburg
- House: Wettin
- Father: John William, Duke of Saxe-Weimar
- Mother: Dorothea Susanne of Simmern

Duchess Maria of Saxe-Weimar (7 October 1571 – 7 March 1610) was Princess-Abbess of Quedlinburg from 1601 until her death.

Born in Weimar, Maria was the daughter of John William, Duke of Saxe-Weimar, and Dorothea Susanne of Simmern.

Anna III, Princess-Abbess of Quedlinburg, died on 12 May 1601. The provost of the congregation had died of plague and had not been replaced. Maria was suggested as Anna III's successor by the guardian of the abbey, her brother Frederick William I, Duke of Saxe-Weimar. Emperor Rudolf II confirmed her election on 2 July.

Maria's reign was calm. She proved to be unwilling to confront the abbey's protectors, the dukes of Saxony, which led to the decrease in her own temporal authority. She died suddenly in Halle, Saxony-Anhalt, on her way to Dresden, and was buried in Quedlinburg. She was succeeded by Princess Dorothea of Saxony.

Maria House of Wettin
Regnal titles
| Preceded by Anna III | Princess-Abbess of Quedlinburg; 1601–1610 | Succeeded by Dorothea |
