= Elisabeth II, Abbess of Quedlinburg =

Elisabeth II
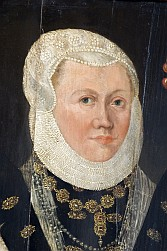

Princess-Abbess of Quedlinburg
- Reign: 1574–1584
- Predecessor: Anna II
- Successor: Anna III
- Born: 1542
- Died: 20 July 1584 (aged 41–42); Quedlinburg Abbey
- House: Regenstein
- Father: Count Ulrich of Regenstein-Blankenburg
- Mother: Magdalene of Stolberg
- Religion: Lutheran

Countess Elisabeth of Regenstein-Blankenburg (1542 – 20 July 1584) was Princess-Abbess of Quedlinburg. As such, she is numbered Elisabeth II.

Elisabeth was the daughter of Count Ulrich of Regenstein-Blankenburg, and his second wife, Magdalene of Stolberg.

== Reign ==
In 1565, with the consent of both the Holy Roman Emperor and the Pope, she was elected coadjutor to Anna II, the first Protestant Abbess of Quedlinburg. Abbess Anna II died on 4 March 1574; a day after Anna II's death, Elisabeth was consecrated Princess-Abbess of Quedlinburg, and as such she was also Princess of the Holy Roman Empire. Elisabeth II was the second Protestant Abbess of Quedlinburg and the first one to be Protestant at the moment of her election.

Augustus, Elector of Saxony, was initially against her election. He eventually agreed to recognize her as abbess, on condition that he approves all the future candidates for the office of Abbess of Quedlinburg. Elisabeth II had to agree to impose taxes together with Augustus.

Abbess Elisabeth II hosted a theological conference in 1583, a year before her death. Elisabeth II died on 20 July 1584. Countess Anna of Stolberg-Wernigerode succeeded Elisabeth as Anna III.

Elisabeth II House of Regenstein
Regnal titles
Preceded by Anna II	Princess-Abbess of Quedlinburg; 5 March 1574 – 20 July 1584	Succeeded by Anna III
