= List of princess-abbesses of Quedlinburg =

This is a list of the princess-abbesses of Quedlinburg Abbey.

No.	Name	Image	Reign	Notes	House
1	Matilda; 955 - 7 February 999		966–999	Daughter of Otto I, Holy Roman Emperor, and Adelaide of Italy; granddaughter of Saint Matilda, founder of the abbey.	Ottonian dynasty
2	Adelaide I 977- 14 January 1044		999–1044	Niece of Matilda and daughter of Otto II, Holy Roman Emperor, and Theophanu.	Ottonian dynasty
3	Beatrice I 1037- 13 July 1061		1044–1061	Daughter of Henry III, Holy Roman Emperor, and his first wife, Gunhilda of Denmark.	Salian dynasty
4	Adelaide II; 1045 - 11 January 1096		1062–1096	Half-sister of Beatrice I and daughter of Henry III, Holy Roman Emperor, and his second wife, Agnes of Poitou.	Salian dynasty
5	Eilica; 1080 - 1142 (?)		1096–1110	The only surviving traces of Eilica are coins found in Sweden.	
6	Agnes I 1088- 1125/6		1110–1125/6	Niece of Beatrice I and Adelaide II and daughter of Vladislaus I Herman, Duke of Poland, and Judith of Swabia.	Piast dynasty
7	Gerberga died 12 July 1137		1126–1137	Sister of Counts Gottfried and Otto von Cappenberg.	House of Cappenberg
8.	Beatrice II; 1123- 2 April 1160		1137–1160	Daughter of Herrmann I, Count of Winzenburg, and Hedwig of Wöltingerode.	House of Formbach
9	Meregart		1160–1161		
10	Adelaide III died 1 May 1184		1161–1184	Daughter of Frederick VI, Count Palatine of Saxony, and Lutgard of Salzwedel.	House of Sommerschenburg
11	Agnes II; 19 June 1145 - 22 January 1203		1184–1203	Daughter of Conrad, Margrave of Meissen, and Luitgard of Elchingen-Ravenstein.	House of Wettin
12	Sophia I 1182 - 9 June 1226		1203–1226	Niece of Agnes II and daughter of Frederick I of Brehna and Hedwig of Böhmen-Jamnitz.	House of Wettin
13	Bertradis I 1221-1229		1226–1230	Daughter of Dedo II, Lord of Krosigk, and Adelaide of Harbke.	House of Krosigk
14	Cunigunde; 1222-1231		1230–1231	Sister of Bishop Meinard von Kranichfeld	House of Kranichfeld
15	Osterlinde died 1233		1231–1233		House of Falkenstein
16	Gertrude died 11 October 1270		1233–1270	Daughter of Werner von Ampfurth.	House of Ampfurth
17	Bertradis II; 1270-13 October 1308		1270–1308		
18	Jutta; 1285- 5 November 1347		1308–1347	Daughter of Volrad VIII, Count of Kranichfeld.	House of Schwarzburg
19	Luitgard; 1336-17 December 1353		1347–1353	Daughter of Louis, Count of Stolberg-Wernigerode.	House of Stolberg
20	Agnes III died 9 October 1364		1354–1362	Daughter of Lappo von Schraplau.	House of Schraplau
21	Elisabeth I died 1375		1362–1375		House of Hakeborn
22	Margaret; 1355- 13/14 December 1379		1376–1379	Sister of Agnes III and daughter Lappo von Schraplau.	House of Schraplau
23	Irmgard; 1356-20/22 August 1405		1379–1405	Daughter of Albert I, Burgrave of Kirchberg and Elisabeth of Orlamünde.	House of Kirchberg
24	Adelaide IV; 1376-†15 March 1441		1405–1435	Daughter of Henry II, Lord of Isenburg, and Countess Adelaide of Hanau.	House of Isenburg
25	Anna I 1416-14 January 1458 Quedlinburg		1435–1458	Daughter of Heinrich IX von Reuss, Lord of Plauen and Königswarth, and Countess Anna of Riesenburg.	House of Reuss
26	Hedwig; 31 October 1445 – 13 June 1511		1458–1511	Daughter of Frederick II, Elector of Saxony, and Margaret of Austria and niece of Frederick III, Holy Roman Emperor.	House of Wettin
27	Magdalene; 1491- 2 October 1515		1511–1515	Daughter of Albert IV of Anhalt and Elisabeth of Mansfeld.	House of Ascania
28	Anna II; 28 January 1504 - 4 March 1574		1515–1574	The last Catholic abbess and the first Lutheran abbess. Daughter of Bodo VIII, Count of Stolberg-Wernigerode, and Anna von Eppenstein.	House of Stolberg
29	Elisabeth II; 1542- 20 July 1584		1574–1584	Daughter of Count Ulrich of Regenstein-Blankenburg and Magdalena of Stolberg.	House of Regenstein
30	Anna III; 3 April 1565 – 12 May 1601		1584–1601	Daughter of Count Henry of Stolberg and Elisabeth von Gleichen.	House of Stolberg
31	Maria; 7 October 1571- 7 March 1610		1601–1610	Daughter of John William, Duke of Saxe-Weimar and Countess Dorothea Susanna of the Palatinate.	House of Wettin
32	Dorothea; 7 January 1591 – 17 November 1617		1610–1617	Daughter of Christian I, Elector of Saxony and Sophie of Brandenburg.	House of Wettin
33	Dorothea Sophia; 19 December 1587 - 10 February 1645		1617–1645	Daughter of Frederick William I and Sophie of Württemberg.	House of Wettin
34	Anna Sophia I 2 April 1619 1. September 1680		1645–1680	Daughter of George William, Count Palatine of Zweibrücken-Birkenfeld, and Countess Dorothea of Solms-Sonnenwalde.	House of Wittelsbach
35	Anna Sophia II; 17 December 1638 – 13 December 1683		1681–1683	Daughter of George II, Landgrave of Hesse-Darmstadt, and Princess Sophie Eleonore of Saxony.	House of Hesse-Darmstadt
36	Anna Dorothea; 12 November 1657 - 24 June 1704		1684–1704	Daughter of John Ernest II, Duke of Saxe-Weimar, and Duchess Christine Elisabeth of Schleswig-Holstein-Sonderburg.	House of Wettin
37	Marie Elisabeth; 21 March 1678 - 17 July 1755		1718–1755	Daughter of Christian Albert, Duke of Schleswig-Holstein-Gottorp and Princess Frederica Amalia of Denmark.	House of Schleswig-Holstein-Gottorp
38	Anna Amalia; 9 November 1723 – 30 March 1787		1756–1787	Daughter of King Frederick William I of Prussia and Duchess Sophia Dorothea of Hanover.	House of Hohenzollern
39	Sophia Albertina; 8 October 1753 - 17 March 1829		1787–1803	Niece of Anna Amalia and daughter of King Adolf Frederick of Sweden and Princess Louisa Ulrika of Prussia.	House of Schleswig-Holstein-Gottorp
