= Henry of Stolberg =

- Born: 2 January 1509; Stolberg Castle in Stolberg
- Died: 12 November 1572 (aged 63); Stolberg Castle in Stolberg
- Noble family: House of Stolberg
- Spouse: Elisabeth of Gleichen
- Father: Bodo VIII, Count of Stolberg-Wernigerode
- Mother: Anna of Eppstein-Königstein

Count Henry of Stolberg (2 January 1509 – 12 November 1572 at Stolberg Castle) was a German nobleman.

== Life ==
Henry was born at Stolberg Castle in Stolberg, the fourth son of the ruling Count Bodo VIII and his wife Countess Anna of Eppstein-Königstein. His eldest sister was Juliana of Stolberg, the ancestress of the House of Orange-Nassau. He was named after his uncle, Count Henry the Younger of Stolberg, whose body was transferred from Cologne to Stolberg the day after Henry was born.

Henry was educated for several years at the court of his maternal grandfather, Count Eberhard of Eppstein. One of his teachers was the famous humanist dr. Johann Caesarius from Cologne.

From November 1525, Henry studied at the University of Leipzig, where his advisor was Tilemann Plathner. His father managed to reserve posts as dean for him in Cologne and Mainz. In 1538, a post as dean in Halberstadt fell vacant. Henry moved to Halberstadt and began to furnish a manor in Dardesheim for himself.

In 1542, he was appointed cathedral dean in Cologne, after the death of his predecessor, Frederick of Beichlingen. Back to Cologne, he learned that the new archbishop, Hermann of Wied had converted to Protestantism. Henry also converted to Protestantism and together they started spreading the new faith. The pope then removed them both from office.

== Marriage and issue ==
On 3 November 1556 in Quedlinburg, Henry married Elisabeth (d. 1578), a daughter of Count Hector I of Gleichen. They had four children:

- Bodo (1559–1583), inherited Stolberg-Wernigerode
- George Louis (1562–1618), inherited Stolberg-Ortenburg
- Anna (1565–1601), abbess of Quedlinburg as Anna III
- Christopher (1567–1638), inherited Stolberg-Wernigerode after Bodo's death
