= Stolberg Castle =

Coordinates: 51°34′29.50″N 10°57′14.50″E

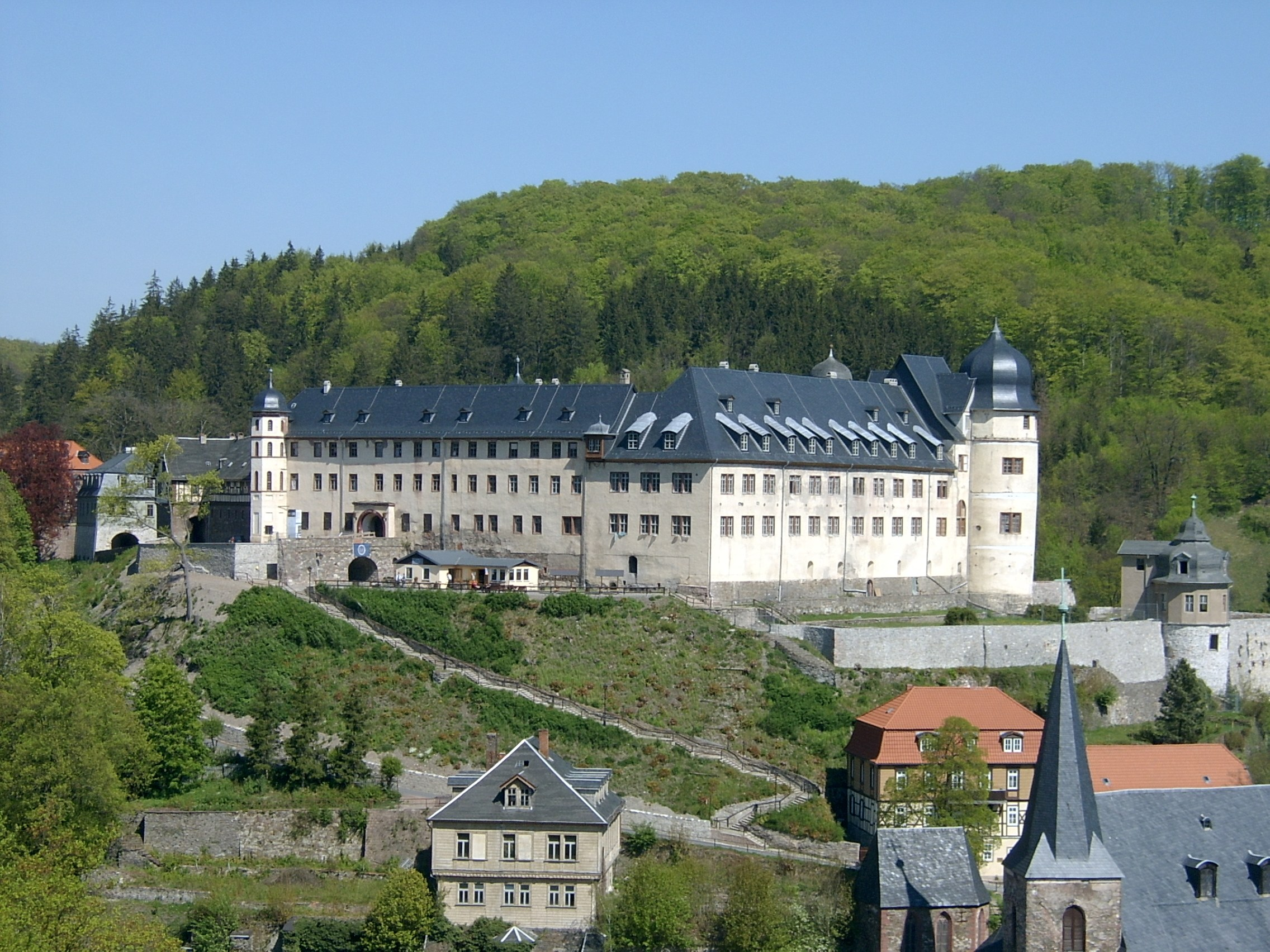
Stolberg Castle

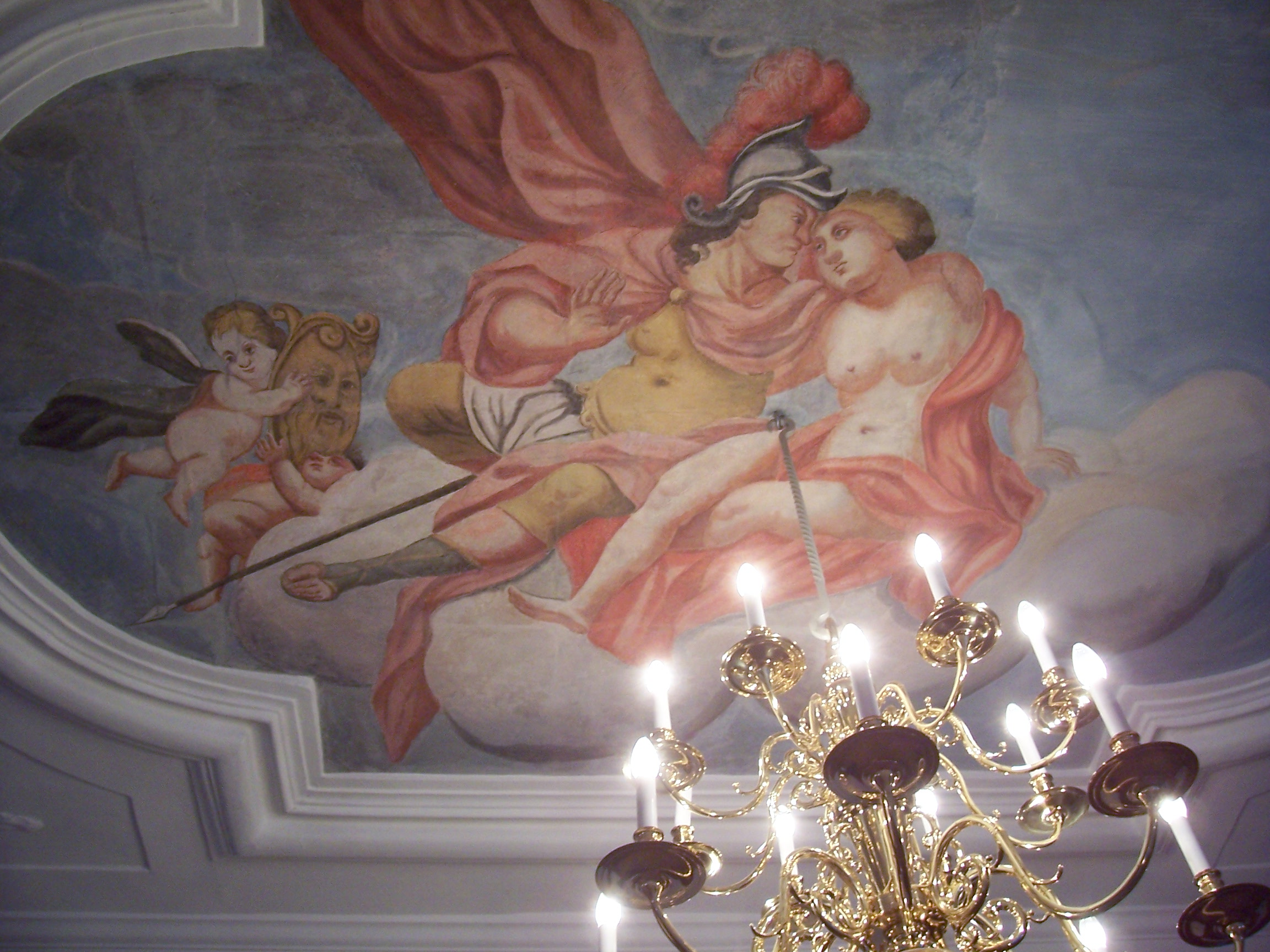
Ceiling mural at Stolberg Castle

Stolberg Castle (German: Schloss Stolberg) is a palace in the town of Stolberg in the Harz Mountains of Germany. It dates to the 13th century and stands above the town on a hill with steep drops on three sides. Since 2003 it has been completely restored and renovated by the German Foundation for Monument Conservation.

== History ==
Its oldest element, the round tower, dates to the time around 1200, the more recent elements were built in the Renaissance style between 1539 and 1547. In the southeast wing is the Classicist Great Reception Room (Großes Empfangszimmer) and the Red Room (Roter Saal) designed by Karl Friedrich Schinkel. The castle was given its present appearance thanks to rebuilding between 1690 and 1700. Until they were dispossessed in 1945, the castle was owned by the family of the Prince of Stolberg-Stolberg.

From 1947 the castle was used as a holiday home for the Free German Trade Union Federation (FDGB). The work carried out for this purpose and its numerous guests left behind many traces in the fabric of the building and the appearance of the interior. In 1990, ownership of the castle was transferred to the Treuhand and it then stood empty. A private investor bought it in 1993, in order to open it as an hotel. Inadequate roof renovation work subsequently caused damage through damp and dry rot. After the hotel project foundered in 1994, the Stolberg Castle stood empty again and was in danger of being completely lost. At the end of 2002 the German Foundation for Monument Conservation took over the construction work following an agreement with the state of Saxony-Anhalt. The fabric of the building was made safe and gradually renovated. In 2008 the Prince's Wing (Fürstenflügel) opened its doors and, in 2009, the castle chapel was reconsecrated.

By 2008 about 12 million euros of support had been made available by the German Federation, the state of Saxony-Anhalt, the European Union, the town of Stolberg and the German Foundation for Monument Conservation for the repairs to the building. Since March 2008 parts of the castle have been open to the public again and used as a tourist centre and reception venue (Haus des Gastes).

== Garden dreams ==
Stolberg Palace and Gardens are part of the Saxony-Anhalt Garden Dreams project.
