= Schwarzenfels Castle =

- Burg Schwarzenfels
- Schwarzenfels
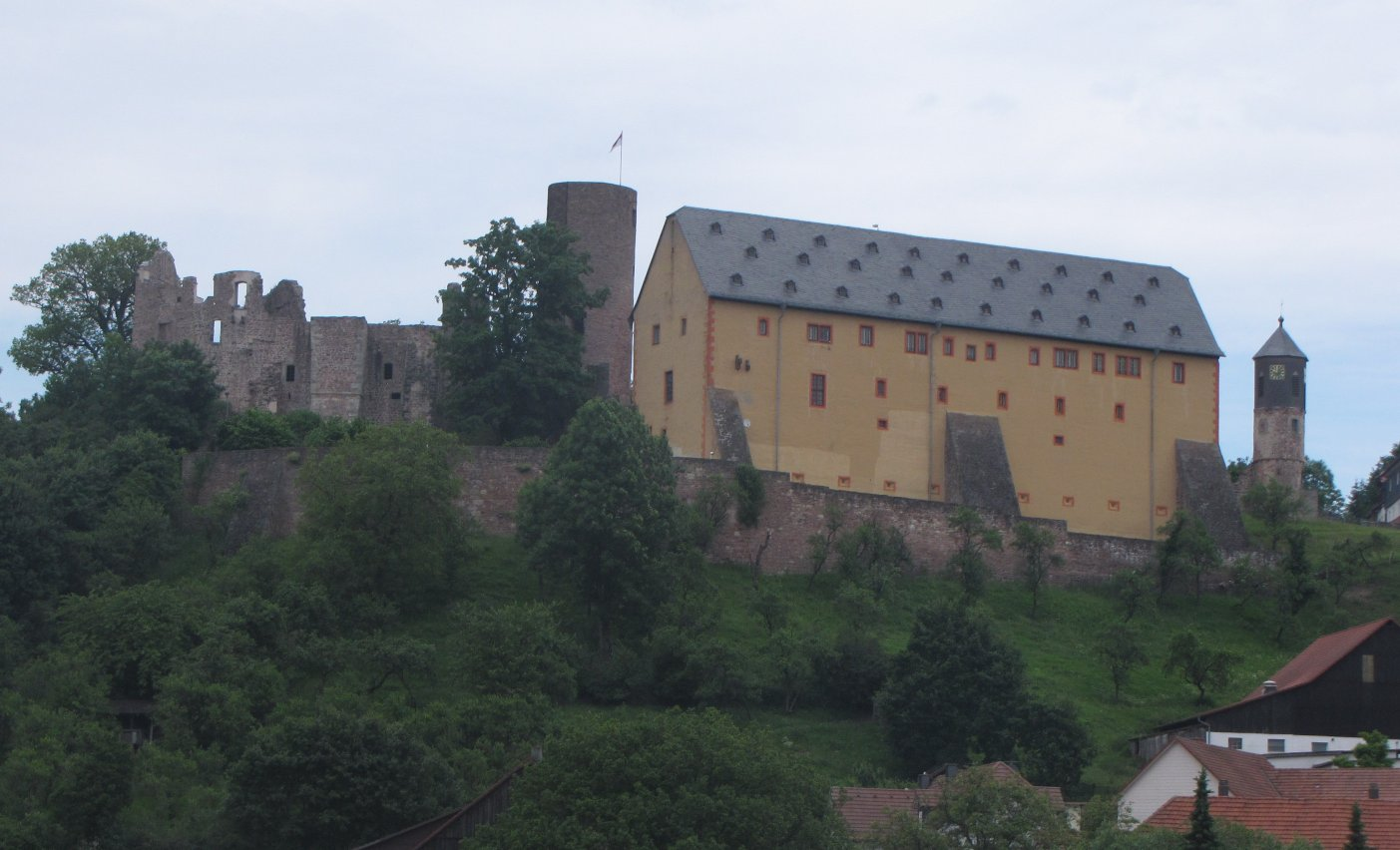

Site information
- Type: Medieval castle

Location
- Coordinates: 50°18′1.4″N 9°40′14.9″E

Site history
- Built: 1280

Schwarzenfels Castle (German: Burg Schwarzenfels) is a ruined castle in the village of Schwarzenfels in Hesse, Germany.

The castle was damaged and became a ruin in 1648 near the end of the Thirty Years War, but the German State of Hesse has restored portions of the castle and maintained the grounds around the castle. The upper tower is completely restored. The restoration includes a modern spiral staircase, an observation deck, and a flagpole.

== Sources and external links ==
- Burgenwelt in German.
