= Marienschloss Abbey =

Former Cistercian nunnery in Hesse, Germany

Coordinates: 50.4326°N 8.7314°E

Marienschloss Abbey (German: Kloster Marienschloss) is a former Cistercian nunnery in Rockenberg, a town in Hesse, Germany. It is now used as Rockenberg Prison (German: Justizvollzugsanstalt Rockenberg).

== History ==
It may have been preceded on the site by a hermitage dedicated to nursing. The nunnery was founded on 30 April 1338 Sir Johann von Bellersheim and his wife Gertrude, called Gezele von Düdelsheim. Its monastery church was consecrated to St Mary and St John the Baptist on 1 November 1339 and in 1342 Pope Innocent VI incorporated the monastery into the Cistercian order and made it subordinate to Arnsburg Abbey. During the 14th and 15th century it was assigned lands. Monastic discipline declined under Abbess Lucia von Wiesen and so in 1466 bishop Adolph II of Nassau replaced almost all the nuns and installed a new abbess. In 1535 the Protestant Reformation was introduced to Rockenberg - the monastery remained Catholic but the abbess was patron to the town's parish church and appointed tolerant Protestant pastors. In 1544 the Diet of Speyer assigned the nunnery to Emperor Charles V and in 1581 it passed to the Electorate of Mainz.

Oppershofen and Rockenberg became Catholic again in 1602-1603 due to the Counter Reformation and the abbey undertook major rebuilds from 1606 to 1619. However, it was badly looted several times soon afterwards during the Thirty Years' War and many monastery buildings were partially destroyed. These were initially repaired after the war - the vicar general Volusius reported after a visitation in 1678 that the nunnery was "the poorest [of them], but the nuns were the most obedient". It only fully revived in the 18th century with restorations under abbesses Christiane Strebin (holding office 1678 –1724), Franziska Koch (1724–1736) and Antonia Hartz (1736–1774), gradually replacing or redesigning buildings in the Baroque style and extending the cloister. Though the abbey's financial conditions remained modest, a new abbey was completed in 1733, a new provost's house in 1744 and a new Rococo abbey church between 1746 and 1749, though the church's interior was only completed with installation of the new high altar in 1778.

The projects led the abbey into major debt and the war years of 1743, 1757 and especially 1792 led the abbey further into decline. It was occupied by French troops in October 1792 and two years later some of its buildings served as an "imperial hospital". It was finally taken over by Louis I, Grand Duke of Hesse, who forbade religious vows and the admission of novices. It was officially passed to Hesse-Darmstadt in 1803 by the Reichsdeputationshauptschluss. The few remaining nuns moved to live with their relatives or to a house next door to Rockenberg's parish church in 1808 before the abbey was dissolved the following year and converted into a borstal and then in 1811 into a prison. It was then converted into a prison for male teenagers in 1939 before ownership passed to the State of Hesse in 1946.
