= County of Stolberg =

Germany polity

County of Stolberg Grafschaft Stolberg
- 1210–1548
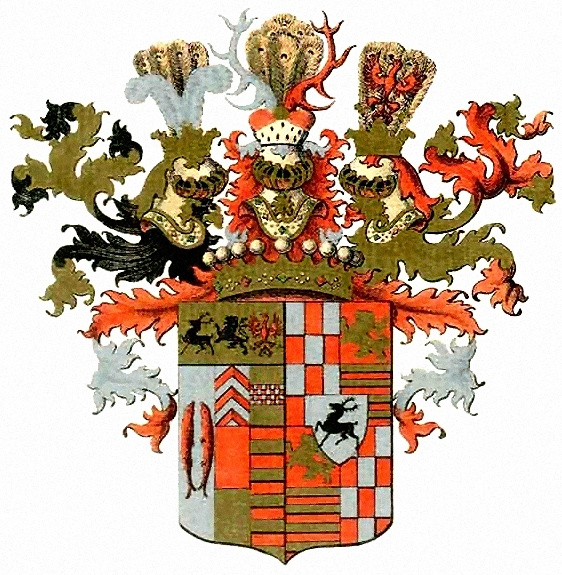
- Coat of arms
- Status: State of the Holy Roman Empire
- Capital: Stolberg
- Government: County
- Historical era: Middle Ages
  - Established: 1210
  - Inherited Wernigerode: 1429
  - Upper Saxon Circle: 1512
  - Division into Harz and Rhenish lines: 1548
Preceded by	Succeeded by
County of Hohnstein	Stolberg-Stolberg; Stolberg-Rochefort

The County of Stolberg (German: Grafschaft Stolberg) was a county of the Holy Roman Empire located in the Harz mountain range in present-day Saxony-Anhalt, Germany. It was ruled by a branch of the House of Stolberg.

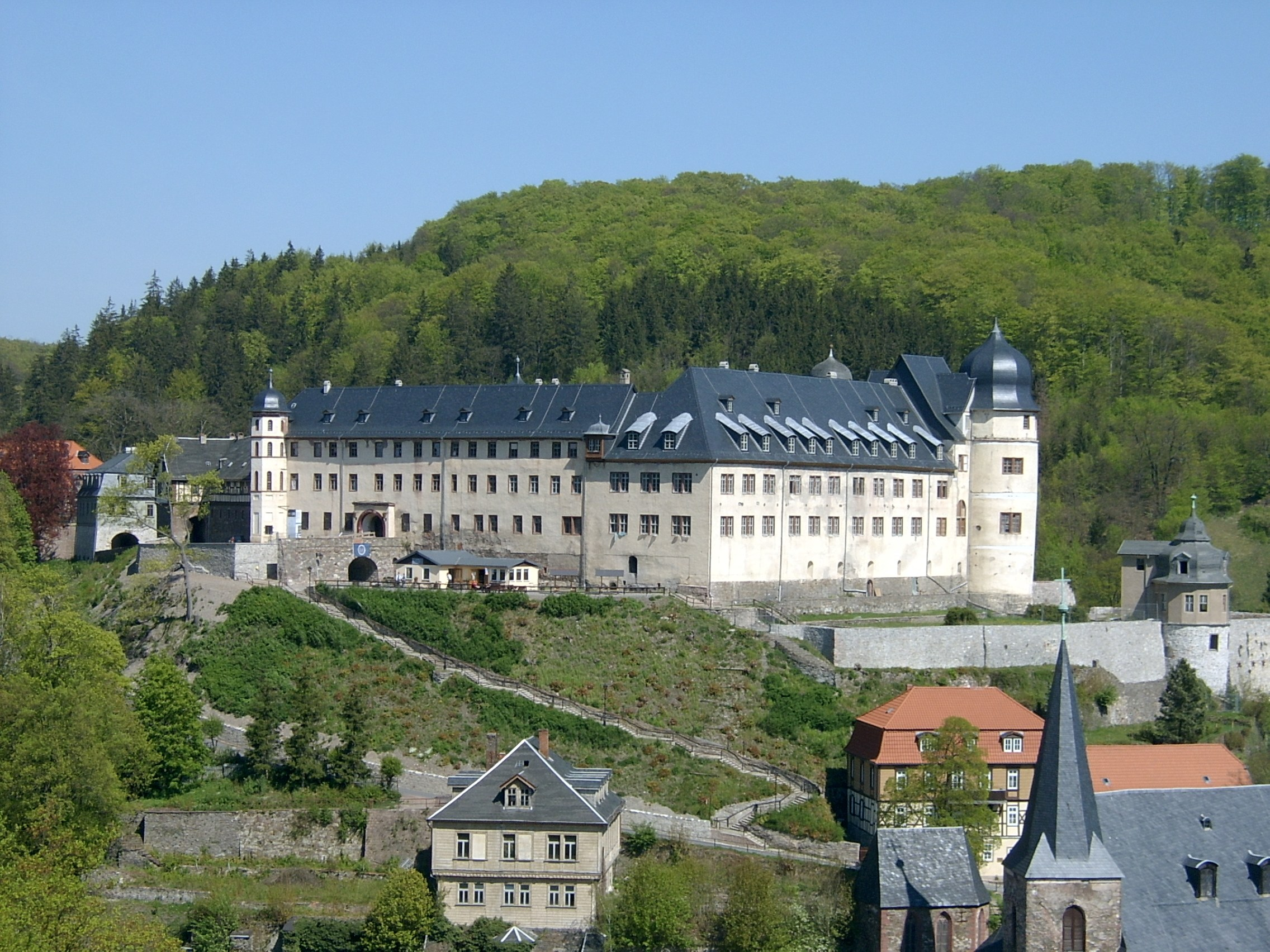
Stolberg Castle

The town of Stolberg was probably founded in the 12th century as a mining settlement. The Counts of Stolberg (Grafen zu Stolberg) probably derived from a branch of the counts of Hohnstein castle near Nordhausen in Thuringia. The castle of Stolberg was first mentioned in 1210 as Stalberg, then the seat of one count Henry originally from nearby Voigtstedt. It remained a property of the comital family until its expropriation in 1945.

The Stolberg lands, which were located mostly east of the Harz, included Stolberg, Hayn, the lower County of Hohnstein (1417), as well as Kelbra and Heringen (1413/17), the two latter territories being ruled alongside the House of Schwarzburg.

The Counts of Stolberg could significantly enlarge their territory when they inherited the County of Wernigerode in 1429, the County of Königstein in 1535, and the County of Rochefort in 1544. The Protestant Reformation was introduced into their territory in 1539. On 19 March 1548 the line was split between a Harz line (Stolberg-Stolberg) and a Rhenish line with the possessions in Rochefort (Stolberg-Rochefort) and Königstein im Taunus (Stolberg-Königstein).

== See also ==
- House of Stolberg
