= Anna II, Abbess of Quedlinburg =

Anna II
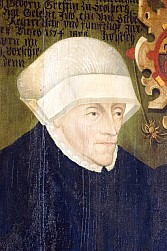
- Anna II painted by an unknown artist, c. 1570

Princess-Abbess of Quedlinburg
- Reign: 1516 – 1574
- Predecessor: Magdalena of Anhalt
- Successor: Elisabeth II
- Born: 28 January 1504; Stolberg, Saxony-Anhalt
- Died: 4 March 1574 (aged 70); Quedlinburg Abbey
- House: Stolberg
- Father: Bodo VIII, Count of Stolberg-Wernigerode
- Mother: Anna of Eppstein-Königstein
- Religion: Lutheran (formerly Roman Catholic)

Countess Anna of Stolberg-Wernigerode (28 January 1504 – 4 March 1574) was a German noblewoman who reigned as Princess-Abbess of Quedlinburg from 1516 until her death. She was elected princess-abbess under the name Anna II at the age of twelve, succeeding Magdalena of Anhalt.

== Family ==
She was born in Stolberg, Saxony-Anhalt, the eldest daughter, and one of the twelve children of Bodo VIII, Count of Stolberg-Wernigerode and Anna of Eppstein-Königstein (1482 – 7 August 1538), daughter of Philip of Eppstein.

== Princess-Abbess of Quedlinburg ==
She was the first Protestant Abbess of Quedlinburg, having embraced Lutheranism in 1539. Anna did not dare to express her Evangelical confession during the reign of George, Duke of Saxony. However, George died in 1539 and was succeeded by his Protestant brother, Henry IV, which left Anna II free to publicly express her Lutheran faith and introduce the Reformation to Quedlinburg. By doing so, Anna II lost some of the privileges and jurisdiction traditionally enjoyed by Catholic territorial abbesses. However, the reformation brought Anna and her community emancipation from seclusion and chance to break their vows. Anna II's decision allowed the women of Quedlinburg to quit the abbey and marry if they chose to do so.

Anna, who governed over a sizeable territory, established Lutheranism in all the houses under her jurisdiction; the choir service in the Abbey Church was abandoned and the monastic offices reduced to four, although the ancient, official titles remained. This resulted in the abrogation of the Catholic religion at Quedlinburg Abbey.

As princess-abbess, Anna II controlled nine churches, two male monasteries and a hospital. During her reign, she established a consistory and set the salaries for school and church officials. She made all priests swear to the Augsburg Confession. She turned a Franciscan monastery into a school for both male and female children, although the order raised objections to her decision. Despite her clearly Protestant religious views, both the Pope and the Holy Roman Emperor gave her permission to choose a coadjutor abbess when she expressed a need for help in her later years.

Anna died on 4 March 1574 at the age of seventy and was succeeded by Countess Elisabeth of Regenstein-Blankenburg (Elisabeth II) the following day.

== See also ==
- Protestant Reformation

Anna II House of Stolberg
Regnal titles
Preceded by Magdalena	Princess-Abbess of Quedlinburg; 1516–1574	Succeeded by Elisabeth II
