= Beatrix of Baden =

Margravine of Baden, Countess Palatine of Simmern

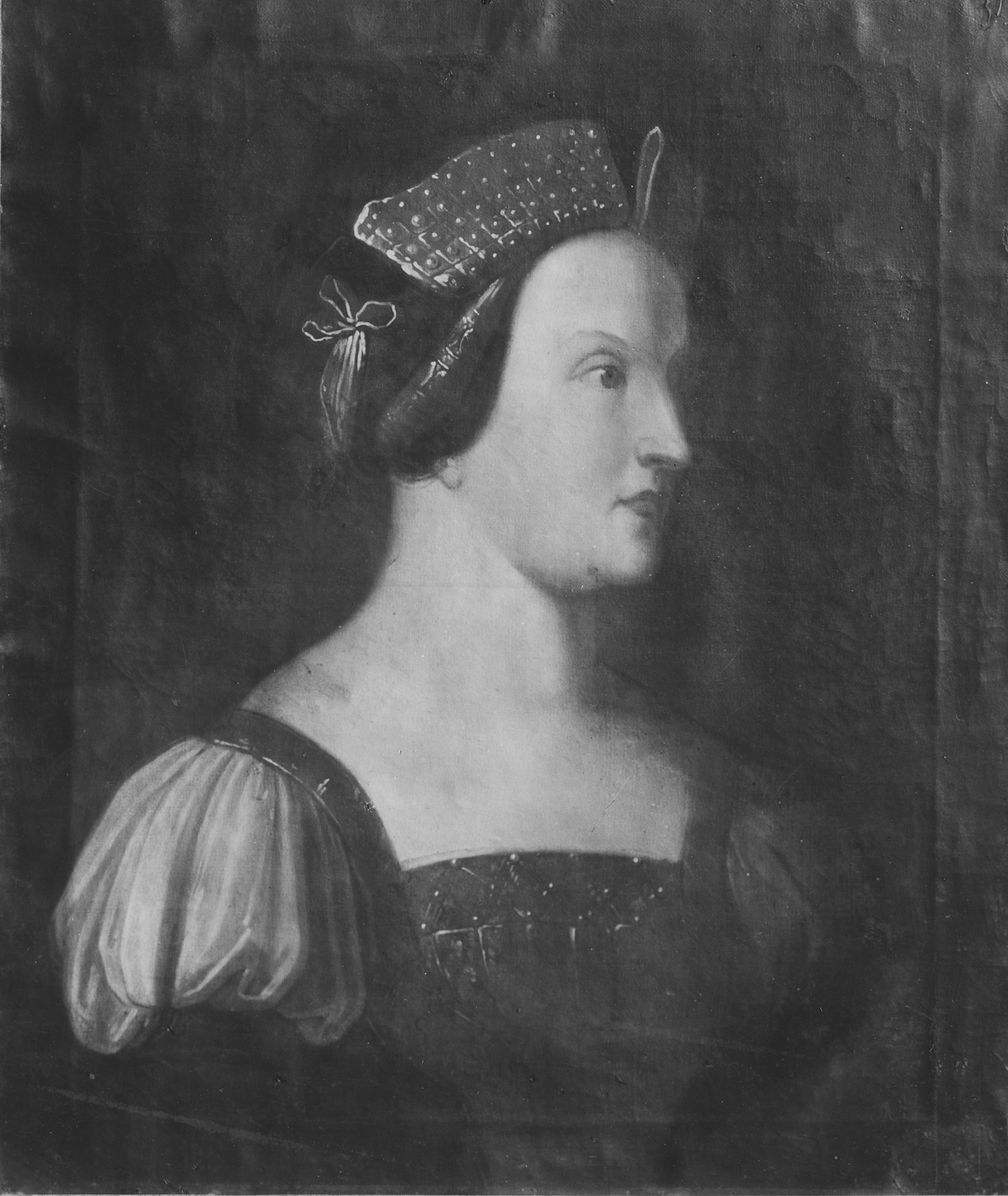
- Born: 22 January 1492
- Died: 4 April 1535 (aged 43)
- Noble family: House of Zähringen
- Spouse: John II, Count Palatine of Simmern
- Issue Detail: Frederick III; Georg; Reichard; Sabina; Helena
- Father: Christoph I, Margrave of Baden
- Mother: Ottilie of Katzenelnbogen

Beatrix of Baden (22 January 1492 – 4 April 1535) was a margravine (wife of a margrave) of Baden by birth and by marriage and a Countess Palatine of Simmern. She was a daughter of Christoph I, Margrave of Baden and Ottilie of Katzenelnbogen.

== Marriage and issue ==
In 1508 she married the Count Palatine Johann II of Simmern (born: 21 March 1492; died: 18 May 1557). With him she had twelve children:

1. Catherine (1510–1572), Abbess in Kumbd monastery
2. Johanna (1512–1581), Abbess in Marienberg monastery at Boppard
3. Ottilia (1513–1553), nun at Marienberg in Boppard
4. Frederick III the Pious (1515–1576), Elector Palatine, married firstly 1537 Princess Marie of Brandenburg-Kulmbach (1519–1567), married secondly 1569 Countess Amalia of Neuenahr-Alpen (1540–1602)
5. Brigitta (1516–1562), Abbess at Neuburg an der Donau
6. Georg (1518–1569), Count Palatine of Simmern-Sponheim, married in 1541 princess Elisabeth of Hesse (1503–1563)
7. Elisabeth (1520–1564), married in 1535 Count Georg II of Lauterbach (1506-1569)
8. Reichard (1521–1598), Count Palatine of Simmern-Sponheim, married in firstly 1569 Countess Juliane of Wied (1545-1575). married in secondly 1578 Countess Emilie of Württemberg (1550-1589), married in thirdly 1589 Countess Palatine Anna Margarete of Veldenz (1571-1621)
9. Maria (1524–1576), nun at Marienberg in Boppard
10. William (1526–1527)
11. Sabine (1528–1578), married in 1544 Count Lamoral of Egmont (1522–1568)
12. Helena (1532–1579) married in 1551 Count Philipp III of Hanau-Münzenberg (1526–1561)

== Ancestors ==
Ancestors of Beatrix of Baden

16. Bernard I, Margrave of Baden-Baden
8. Jacob, Margrave of Baden-Baden
17. Anna of Oettingen
4. Charles I, Margrave of Baden-Baden
18. Charles II, Duke of Lorraine
9. Catherine de Lorraine
19. Margaret of the Palatinate
2. Christopher I, Margrave of Baden
20. Leopold III, Duke of Austria
10. Ernest, Duke of Austria
21. Viridis Visconti
5. Catherine of Austria
22. Siemowit IV of Masovia
11. Cymburgis of Masovia
23. Alexandra of Lithuania
1. Beatrice of Baden
24. John IV, Count of Katzenelnbogen
12. Philip I, Count of Katzenelnbogen
25. Anne of Katzenelnbogen
6. Philip II of Katzenelnbogen
26. Eberhard IV, Count of Württemberg
13. Anna of Württemberg
27. Henriette of Mömpelgard
3. Ottilie of Katzenelnbogen
28. Engelbert I of Nassau
14. Henry II, Count of Nassau-Siegen
29. Johanna van Polanen
7. Ottilie of Nassau-Siegen
30. Rupert IV of Virneburg
15. Genoveva of Virneburg
31. Agnes of Solms-Braunfels
