= Anna of Eppstein-Königstein =

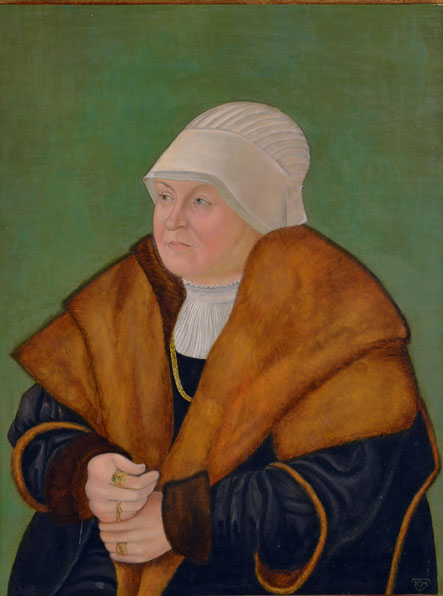
- Born: 1481; Königstein im Taunus
- Died: 7 August 1538; Stolberg
- Noble family: Eppstein
- Spouse: Bodo VIII, Count of Stolberg-Wernigerode
- Father: Philip I of Eppstein-Königstein
- Mother: Louise de la Marck

Anna of Eppstein-Königstein (1481 in Königstein – 7 August 1538 in Stolberg) was the daughter of Philip I of Eppstein-Königstein and his wife, Louise de la Marck.

== Marriage and issue ==
On 24 August 1500, the pregnant Anna married Bodo VIII, Count of Stolberg-Wernigerode. Bodo and Anna had many children:

- Wolfgang (born: 1 October 1500; died: 8 March 1552), married Dorothea of Regenstein-Blankenburg and Genovefa of Wied
- Bodo (born: 1502; died: after 2 May 1503)
- Anna (born: 28 January 1504; died 4 March 1574), the 28th Abbess of the Imperial Abbey at Quedlinburg
- Louis, (born: 12 January 1505; died: 1 September 1574), Count of Stolberg-Wernigeorde, married Walpurga Johanna of Wied-Runkel
- Juliana (born: 15 February 1506; died: 18 June 1580), married Philip II, Count of Hanau-Münzenberg and William I, Count of Nassau-Siegen; she is regarded as the matriarch of the House of Orange-Nassau
- Maria (born: 8 December 1507; died: 6 January 1571), married Kuno II, Count of Leiningen-Westerburg
- Henry (born: 2 January 1509; died: 12 November 1572), Count of Stolberg-Wernigerode, married Elisabeth of Gleichen-Rembda
- Philip (born: 24 May 1510; died: shortly after 21 September 1531)
- Magdalene (born: 6 November 1511; died 19 November 1546), married Ulrich IX, Count of Regenstein-Blankenburg
- Eberhard (born: 1513; died: 21 April 1526)
- Catherine (born: 24 October 1514; died: 18 June 1577), married Albert, Count of Henneberg
- Albert (born: 2 March 1516; died 4 July 1587), Count of Stolburg-Schwarza
- Christopher (born: 10 January 1524; died 8 August 1581), Count of Stolberg-Gedern
