= Lords of Eppstein =

German noble family (c. 1185–1535)

The coat of arms of the Lords of Eppstein

The Lords of Eppstein (German: Herren von Eppstein) were a family of German nobility in the Middle Ages. From the 12th century they ruled extensive territories in the Rhine Main area from their castle in Eppstein, northwest of Frankfurt, Germany.

== History ==
Between 1180 and 1190, the Archbishop of Mainz enfeoffed Eppstein Castle, along with neighboring district courts and villages to Gerhard III of Hainhausen. Gerhard changed his name to Eppstein and already having control of the present-day district of Offenbach, became the first in the line which was soon to become one of the most influential families in the Rhine Main area.

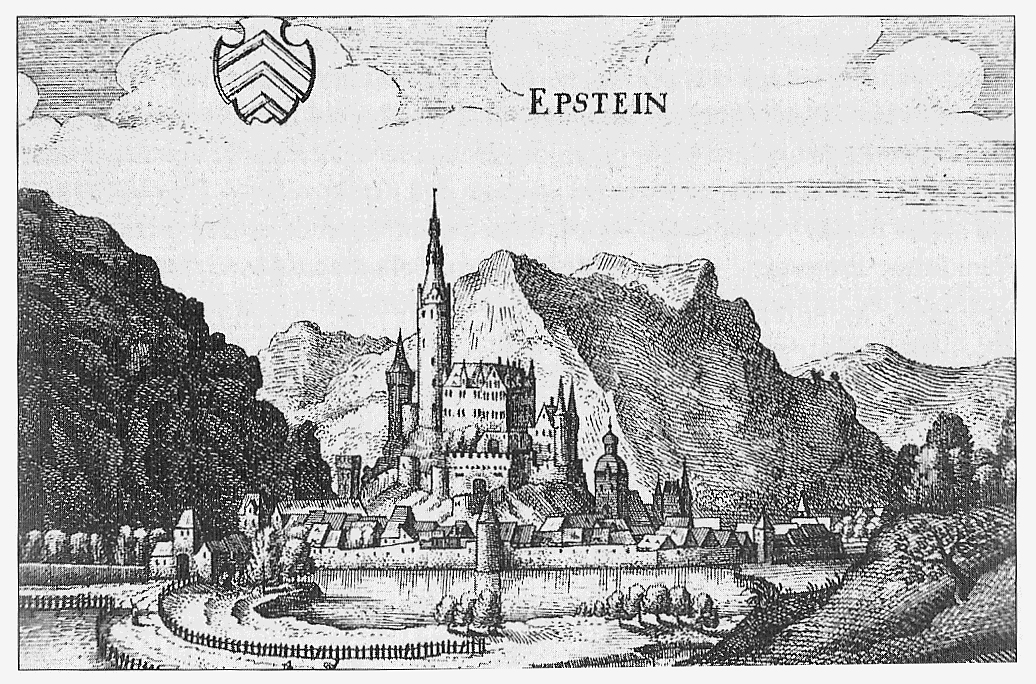
The castle of the Eppsteins by Matthäus Merian in 1646

Four of the seven Archbishops of Mainz and Electoral Princes in the 13th century were of the house of Eppstein. They raised the Electorate to considerable power and played a significant role in the politics of the Holy Roman Empire. In the struggle between the Emperor and the Pope, Archbishop Siegfried III took sides with the anti-Staufer group which played an important part in the beginnings of German federalism. The secular Eppsteiners, by purchase, marriage and enfeoffment, acquired extensive territories and rights from the Middle Rhine to the Vogelsberg hills and from the Lahn River to the Odenwald.

The realm of the Lords of Eppstein was divided in 1433 between brothers Gottfried VII (Eppstein-Münzenberg) and Eberhard II (Eppstein-Königstein). The last of these branches became extinct in 1535 and Eppstein was passed mostly to the Landgraves of Hesse and the Ecclesiastical Principality of Mainz.

== See also ==
- Bad Homburg vor der Höhe
