= Emil Sembach =

German Nazi SS officer (1891–1934)

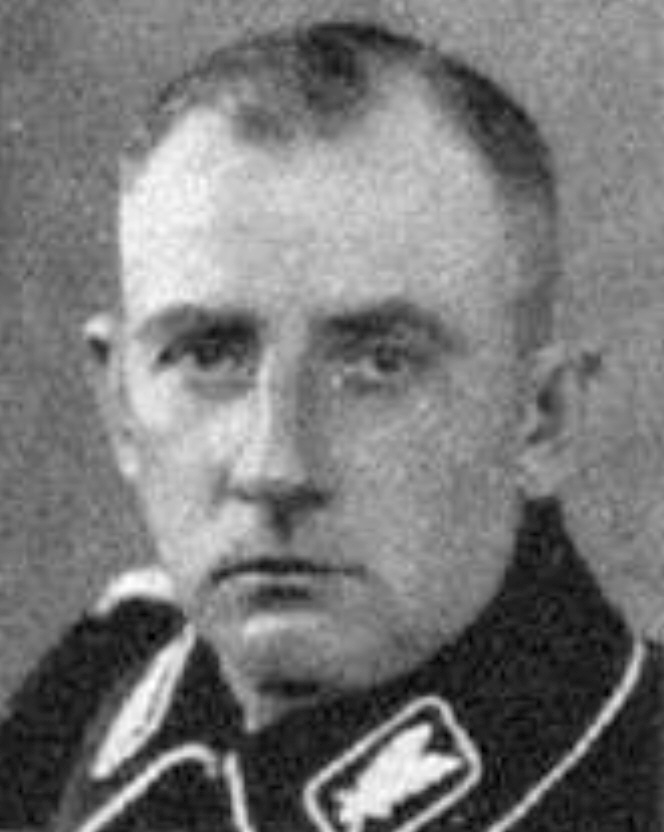
- Sembach, c. 1934
- Born: March 2, 1891; Grein, Upper Austria, Austria-Hungary
- Died: 1 July 1934 (aged 43); Vicinity of the Giant Mountains; Silesia, Nazi Germany
- Cause of death: Execution by gunshot
- Military career
- Allegiance: German Empire; Nazi Germany
- Branch: Imperial German Army; Freikorps; Allgemeine SS
- Service years: 1909–1921; 1931–1934
- Rank: Hauptmann; SS-Oberführer
- Units: 4th Foot Artillery Regiment; Reserve Foot Artillery Regiments 16 and 1
- Commands: 15th SS-Standarte; SS-Abschnitt VI
- Known for: Night of the Long Knives victim
- Conflicts: World War I
- Awards: Iron Cross, 1st and 2nd class Baltic Cross

Emil Sembach (2 March 1891 – 1 July 1934) was an Austrian-born German military officer who joined the Nazi Party and became an SS-Oberführer in Silesia. Under investigation for financial irregularities, he was demoted, expelled from the SS and subsequently murdered during the Night of the Long Knives.

== Early life and education ==
Sembach was born on 2 March 1891, in Forsthaus Stifting near Grein, Upper Austria, the son of a chief forester. He attended the Casimirianum, a humanistic Gymnasium in Coburg.

== Military and Freikorps service ==
After obtaining his Abitur, Sembach enlisted as a Fahnenjunker (officer candidate) in the 4th (Magdeburg) Foot Artillery Regiment "Encke". From 1914 to 1918, he participated in the First World War as a battery commander in Reserve Foot Artillery Regiment 16 and in Reserve Foot Artillery Regiment 1. In the immediate post-war years from 1919 to 1921, Sembach took part in combat in the Baltic States as a member of a Freikorps, ultimately serving as an Hauptmann on the staff of the Austrian detachment of the Buchholtz Division.

== Nazi Party political and SS career ==
Returning to civilian life, Sembach earned his living between 1921 and 1932 in commercial professions. He was active in the Völkisch movement from the post-war period onward. He was a member of the paramilitary and anti-democratic Viking League before 1925. In the mid-1920s, he worked as an agent for the Deutscher Herold insurance company in Coburg. An audit revealed a shortfall of 4,000 Reichsmarks in his agency, which was attributed to likely embezzlement on his part. He left the agency and later worked as a management assistant in Berlin.

Sembach joined the Nazi Party on 9 May 1925 (membership number 3,575). On 1 April 1931, he also joined the Schutzstaffel (SS) with SS number 6,640. Initially assigned to the 6th SS-Standarte in Berlin, he rose from commanding a company (Sturm) to commanding a battalion (Sturmbann). In February 1932, he was named the first commander of the 15th SS-Standarte in Berlin. On 15 March 1932, he was advanced to the command of SS-Abschnitt (district) VI in Brieg (today, Brzeg), overseeing three SS-Standarte in the Breslau region He succeeded Udo von Woyrsch, who took over SS-Oberabschnitt (upper district) "Südost" controlling all SS units in Silesia. On 6 October 1932, Sembach was promoted to SS-Oberführer.

In addition to his SS duties, Sembach was also active in electoral politics. In the Prussian state election of 24 April 1932, he ran unsuccessfully for a seat in the Landtag of Prussia from electoral constituency 4 (Potsdam I). At the November 1933 parliamentary election, he won a seat as a deputy of the Reichstag from electoral constituency 8 (Liegnitz), a seat he held until his death.

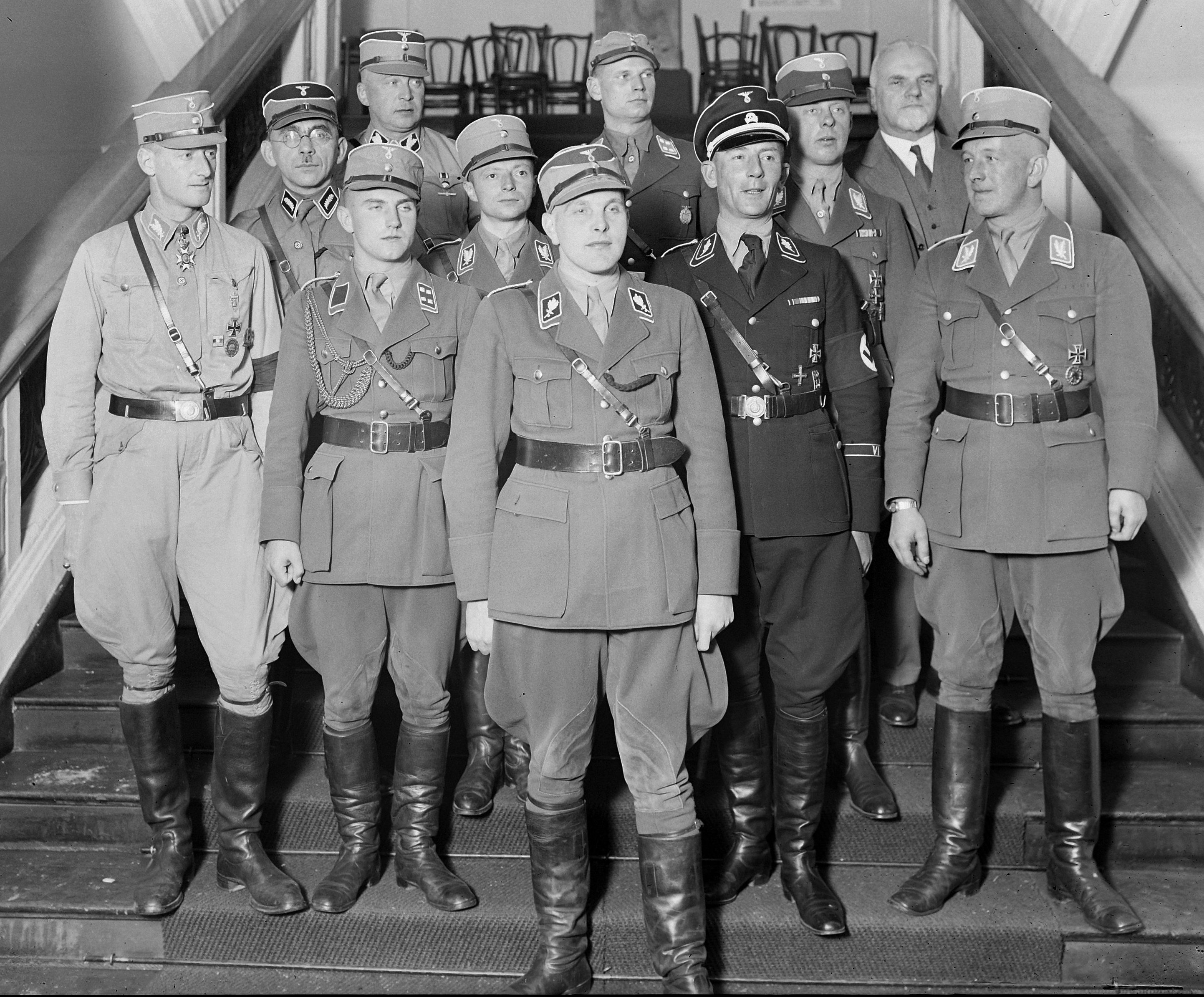
Sembach (in black SS uniform) with a group of Silesian SA officers in Munich, c. 1932–33. In center foreground is the Silesian SA leader, Edmund Heines, who was also killed in the purge.

== Downfall and death ==
During an audit of the accounts of his district in November 1933, discrepancies were discovered that were attributed to embezzlement by Sembach. On 11 December 1933, he was relieved of his position as commander of SS-Abschnitt VI. When he subsequently failed to appear when summoned before Reichsführer-SS Heinrich Himmler on 7 February 1934, he was demoted to the lowest enlisted rank (SS-Mann) and expelled from the SS. Fearful for his safety and of further persecution from the Silesian SS chief Woyrsch, Sembach sought special police protection from Reichsminister of the Interior Wilhelm Frick. However, the Supreme Party Court initiated disciplinary proceedings against Sembach on 26 May 1934, and the regional court in Gau Silesia was charged with conducting an investigation.

Before that could happen, on 30 June 1934, Adolf Hitler launched an internal Party purge that came to be known as the Night of the Long Knives. Some Nazis used this as an opportunity to settle old scores with former rivals or perceived enemies. Woyrsch had developed an intense animosity toward Sembach and convinced Himmler that he should be arrested. Himmler ordered that Sembach be sent to Berlin, but instead he was murdered, most likely on the orders of Woyrsch. Arrested in Brieg on 30 June 1934, Sembach first was driven to an SS facility in Oels (today, Oleśnica) and, the following evening, an SS commando detachment drove him in the direction of the Giant Mountains and he was shot somewhere en route. His corpse was weighted down and thrown in the reservoir at Boberröhrsdorf (today, Siedlęcin), but was later recovered and cremated. An investigation into his murder, initiated by the local public prosecutor, was dismissed under pressure from the SS leadership. Sembach was one of only five SS personnel to fall victim to the purge.

== Aftermath ==
Sembach's widow Maria sought the assistance of Winifred Wagner, the director of the Beyreuth Festival, whom she knew personally and who was a confidant of Hitler, to intercede with him to obtain punishment for the murderers. When approached by Wagner, Hitler reportedly replied that although he had publicly assumed responsibility for the purge, he had not ordered every execution—including that of Sembach.

In August 1957, following a three-month trial in Osnabrück, Udo von Woyrsch was convicted of complicity in the murders of Sembach and seven others. He was sentenced to ten years in jail but only served 30 months, in consideration of time served for other crimes.
