= Gmina Jeżów Sudecki =

Gmina Jeżów Sudecki Jeżów Sudecki Commune
- Gmina
- Coat of arms
- Interactive map of Gmina Jeżów Sudecki
- Coordinates (Jeżów Sudecki): 50°55′57″N 15°44′36″E
- Country: Poland
- Voivodeship: Lower Silesian
- County: Karkonosze
- Seat: Jeżów Sudecki
- Sołectwo: Chrośnica, Czernica, Dziwiszów, Janówek, Jeżów Sudecki, Płoszczyna, Siedlęcin, Wrzeszczyn

Area
  - Total: 94.38 km^{2} (36.44 sq mi)

Population (2019-06-30)
  - Total: 7,438
  - Density: 78.81/km^{2} (204.1/sq mi)
- Website: http://www.jezowsudecki.pl/

Gmina Jeżów Sudecki is a rural gmina (administrative district) in Karkonosze County, Lower Silesian Voivodeship, in south-western Poland.

Its seat is the village of Jeżów Sudecki, which lies approximately 4 kilometres (2.5 mi) north of Jelenia Góra and 94 km (58 mi) west of the regional capital Wrocław. Jeżów Sudecki is a rural gmina (administrative district) located on the slopes of the Kaczawskie Mountains, which border the Jelenia Góra Valley from the north, in south-western Poland. The municipality comprises eight villages (sołectwa): Jeżów Sudecki, Siedlęcin, Dziwiszów, Czernica, Chrośnica, Płoszczyna, Wrzeszczyn and Janówek, with a total population of over 7,000 residents. Agriculture has traditionally formed the basis of the local economy. However, the area’s natural and landscape features support the development of residential housing, tourism, recreation and sport. The surroundings of Góra Szybowcowa (Glider Mountain), the Dziwiszów Hills and Łysa Góra provide favorable conditions for outdoor recreation and attract both residents and visitors from the wider region. Proximity to Jelenia Góra has contributed to growing interest in residential development, including single-family and farmstead housing. A significant part of the municipality lies within the “Bobr Valley Landscape Park” (Park Krajobrazowy Doliny Bobru), which covers 1,797 hectares within the gmina. Additional natural assets include forest complexes of the Kaczawskie Mountains.

The gmina covers an area of 94.38 square kilometres (36.44 sq mi), and as of 2019 its total population is 7,438.

== History ==
The area has a long documented history. The first written reference to Dziwiszów dates from 1255, while Jeżów Sudecki was first mentioned in a document dated 14 November 1299. Until the 17th century, gold and silver ore mines operated in both localities, contributing to their economic development. Following the Thirty Years’ War, mining declined, and hand weaving developed as an important economic activity. Historical monuments in the area reflect this heritage.

In 1999, Jeżów Sudecki celebrated the 700th anniversary of its founding.

== Landmarks ==
Notable historical and architectural sites include:

- Jeżów Sudecki
- Dom Gwarków (House of the Miners), built in 1601, originally an inn serving miners from nearby silver mines; a two-storey timber-frame structure built on a rectangular plan.
- Kozak Cross, commemorating a skirmish during the Napoleonic Wars on 22 August 1813, in which three Cossacks and five French soldiers were killed.
- Siedlęcin
- Siedlęcin Tower (Wieża Książęca), one of the most significant medieval monuments in Poland and the largest preserved residential tower of its type in the country. Built in the second decade of the 14th century by Duke Henry I of Jawor, it contains unique 14th-century wall paintings depicting the legend of Sir Lancelot of the Lake—considered the only preserved murals of this kind in the world. The tower also features some of the oldest preserved wooden ceilings in Poland (dated 1313–1314).
- Historic lime kilns constructed in 1779–1780 and 1843, originally wood-fired and later adapted for coal use.
- Czernica, a Neo-Renaissance palace rebuilt in the second half of the 19th century, surrounded by a park with a pond.
- Dziwiszów, a Renaissance palace and park complex dating from the second half of the 19th century.
- Historic churches are located in Jeżów Sudecki, Dziwiszów, Czernica, Siedlęcin and Chrośnica.
- On the Bóbr River in Siedlęcin and Wrzeszczyn there are early 20th-century dams with operational hydroelectric power plants, which also serve flood-control functions.

== Tourism and sport ==
Glider Mountain (Góra Szybowcowa) has long been associated with aviation sports. Since the 1920s, glider pilots have valued the favorable wind conditions that enable record altitude gains required for advanced gliding certifications. Today the site is popular among hang-glider and paragliding enthusiasts. The flat summit is also used as an airfield by the Jelenia Góra Aeroclub. The surrounding area offers panoramic views of the Jelenia Góra Valley and the Karkonosze Mountains.

The “Perła Zachodu” mountain hostel in Siedlęcin, located above the Modre reservoir within the Bóbr Valley Landscape Park, is considered one of the most scenic locations in the municipality.

Numerous hiking and cycling trails cross the area, including:

- The Green Trail from Jelenia Góra to Strzyżowiec through the Bobr Valley Landscape Park.
- The Blue Trail (part of European route E3), passing through Płoszczyna and Chrośnica.

== Administration and partnerships ==
The municipality is governed by a 15-member Municipal Council.

Local public institutions include primary schools in Jeżów Sudecki, Siedlęcin and Czernica, a Municipal Social Welfare Centre, and a Public Municipal Health Centre.

Since 1992, the gmina has been a member of the Association of Polish Municipalities of the “Euroregion Nysa.” It maintains partnership agreements with Vierkirchen (Germany) and Paseky nad Jizerou (Czech Republic).

Volunteer Fire Brigades operate in several villages, with selected units incorporated into the National Firefighting and Rescue System.

Local sports associations support community physical activity and competitive sport.

The municipality’s location near Jelenia Góra and its developed public transport connections contribute to continued residential development interest, supported by scenic views of the Karkonosze Mountains and the Jelenia Góra Valley.

== Neighbouring gminas ==
Gmina Jeżów Sudecki is bordered by the town of Jelenia Góra and the gminas of Janowice Wielkie, Stara Kamienica, Świerzawa and Wleń.

== Villages ==
The gmina contains the villages of Chrośnica, Czernica, Dziwiszów, Janówek, Jeżów Sudecki, Płoszczyna, Siedlęcin and Wrzeszczyn.

== Twin towns – sister cities ==
Gmina Jeżów Sudecki is twinned with:

- Paseky nad Jizerou, Czech Republic
- Vierkirchen, Germany
