= Sejm Constituency no. 36 =

Polish parliamentary constituency

Kalisz
- Constituency for the Sejm
- Location of Kalisz within Poland
- Counties: Gostyń County; Jarocin County; Kalisz; Kalisz County; Kępno County; Kościan County; Krotoszyn County; Leszno; Leszno County; Ostrów County; Ostrzeszów County; Pleszew County; Rawicz County
- Voivodeship: Greater Poland
- Population: 963,132 (2022)
- Electorate: 754,649 (2023)

Current Constituency
- Created: 2001
- Seats: 12
- Deputies: List: Lidia Czechak (PiS); Jan Dziedziczak (PiS); Andrzej Grzyb (PSL); Piotr Kaleta (PiS); Alicja Łuczak (PO-KO); Jan Mosiński (PiS); Barbara Olwiecka (Poland 2050); Karolina Pawliczak (Ind-KO); Katarzyna Sójka (PiS); Wiesław Szczepański (The Left); Jarosław Urbaniak (PO-KO); Mariusz Witczak (PO-KO)
- Regional assembly: Greater Poland Voivodeship Sejmik
- Senate constituencies: 94, 95 and 96
- EP constituency: 7 – Greater Poland

Kalisz, officially known as Constituency no. 36 (Polish: Okręg wyborczy nr 36), is one of the 41 constituencies of the Sejm, the lower house of the Parliament of Poland, the national legislature of Poland. The constituency was established in 2001, after a major redistricting process across Poland. It is located in the Greater Poland Voivodeship and includes the area of two city counties: Kalisz and Leszno as well as the counties of Gostyń, Jarocin, Kalisz, Kępno, Kościan, Krotoszyn, Leszno, Ostrów, Ostrzeszów, Pleszew and Rawicz. The constituency's district electoral commission is located in Kalisz. The constituency currently elects 12 of the 460 members of the Sejm using the open party-list proportional representation electoral system. At the 2023 parliamentary election it had 754,649 citizens eligible to vote.

== List of deputies ==
Deputies for the 10th Sejm (2023–2027)
Deputy	Party	Parliamentary group
Karolina Pawliczak	Independent	Civic Coalition
Alicja Łuczak	Civic Platform	Civic Coalition
Jarosław Urbaniak	Civic Platform	Civic Coalition
Mariusz Witczak	Civic Platform	Civic Coalition
Jan Dziedziczak	Law and Justice	United Right
Piotr Kaleta	Law and Justice	United Right
Lidia Czechak	Law and Justice	United Right
Jan Mosiński	Law and Justice	United Right
Katarzyna Sójka	Law and Justice	United Right
Barbara Olwiecka	Poland 2050	Poland 2050
Andrzej Grzyb	Polish People's Party	Polish People's Party
Wiesław Szczepański	The Left	New Left

== Election results ==
=== 2001 ===
2001 parliamentary election: Kalisz
Party	Votes	%	Seats
Democratic Left Alliance – Labour Union	165,096	47.31	6
Self-Defence of the Republic of Poland	44,565	12.77	2
Polish People's Party	41,882	12.00	2
Civic Platform	35,452	10.16	1
League of Polish Families	26,132	7.49	1
Law and Justice	14,159	4.06	–
Solidarity of the Right Electoral Action	13,089	3.75	–
Freedom Union	6,722	1.93	–
Alternative Social Movement	1,261	0.36	–
Polish Economic Union	625	0.18	–
Total	348,983	100.00	12
Valid votes	348,983	93.98	
Invalid/blank votes	22,349	6.02	
Total votes	371,332	100.00	
Registered voters/turnout	744,994	49.84	
Source: National Electoral Commission

=== 2005 ===
2005 parliamentary election: Kalisz
Party	Votes	%	Seats
Civic Platform	61,255	21.72	3
Law and Justice	56,771	20.13	3
Self-Defence of the Republic of Poland	46,683	16.55	2
Democratic Left Alliance	36,731	13.02	2
Polish People's Party	30,967	10.98	1
League of Polish Families	21,060	7.47	1
Social Democracy of Poland	12,941	4.59	–
Liberty and Lawfulness	3,983	1.41	–
Democratic Party – demokraci.pl	3,921	1.39	–
Patriotic Movement	3,279	1.16	–
Polish Labour Party	1,790	0.63	–
Centre	869	0.31	–
Polish Confederation – Dignity and Work	662	0.23	–
Polish National Party	608	0.22	–
Initiative of the Republic of Poland	561	0.20	–
Total	282,081	100.00	12
Valid votes	282,081	94.66	
Invalid/blank votes	15,919	5.34	
Total votes	298,000	100.00	
Registered voters/turnout	774,337	38.48	
Source: National Electoral Commission

=== 2007 ===
2007 parliamentary election: Kalisz
Party	Votes	%	Seats
Civic Platform	149,053	38.59	5
Law and Justice	102,266	26.48	3
Left and Democrats	65,221	16.89	2
Polish People's Party	51,750	13.40	2
Self-Defence of the Republic of Poland	8,445	2.19	–
League of Polish Families	4,847	1.25	–
Polish Labour Party	4,653	1.20	–
Total	386,235	100.00	12
Valid votes	386,235	97.04	
Invalid/blank votes	11,783	2.96	
Total votes	398,018	100.00	
Registered voters/turnout	782,596	50.86	
Source: National Electoral Commission

=== 2011 ===
2011 parliamentary election: Kalisz
Party	Votes	%	Seats
Civic Platform	125,596	37.07	5
Law and Justice	82,114	24.24	3
Polish People's Party	43,278	12.77	2
Democratic Left Alliance	40,250	11.88	1
Palikot's Movement	34,367	10.14	1
Poland Comes First	5,836	1.72	–
Congress of the New Right	5,525	1.63	–
Polish Labour Party - August 80	1,833	0.54	–
Total	338,799	100.00	12
Valid votes	338,799	93.85	
Invalid/blank votes	22,220	6.15	
Total votes	361,019	100.00	
Registered voters/turnout	794,470	45.44	
Source: National Electoral Commission

=== 2015 ===
2015 parliamentary election: Kalisz
Party	Votes	%	Seats
Law and Justice	115,668	31.85	5
Civic Platform	89,668	24.69	4
Polish People's Party	39,874	10.98	1
United Left	32,047	8.82	–
Kukiz'15	28,996	7.98	1
Modern	25,557	7.04	1
KORWiN	15,422	4.25	–
Together	11,497	3.17	–
Stonoga Polish Party	1,982	0.55	–
Non-Partisan Electoral Committee	1,973	0.54	–
Self-Defence	500	0.14	–
Total	363,184	100.00	12
Valid votes	363,184	96.38	
Invalid/blank votes	13,641	3.62	
Total votes	376,825	100.00	
Registered voters/turnout	786,549	47.91	
Source: National Electoral Commission

=== 2019 ===
2019 parliamentary election: Kalisz
Party	Votes	%	Seats
Law and Justice	195,053	42.50	6
Civic Coalition	113,489	24.73	3
The Left	61,674	13.44	2
Polish People's Party	58,579	12.76	1
Confederation Liberty and Independence	30,177	6.57	–
Total	458,972	100.00	12
Valid votes	458,972	98.39	
Invalid/blank votes	7,509	1.61	
Total votes	466,481	100.00	
Registered voters/turnout	765,170	60.96	
Source: National Electoral Commission

·=== 2023 ===

2023 parliamentary election: Kalisz
Party	Votes	%	Seats
Law and Justice	194,416	35.85	5
Civic Coalition	154,990	28.58	4
Third Way	87,628	16.16	2
The Left	46,222	8.52	1
Confederation Liberty and Independence	37,838	6.98	–
Nonpartisan Local Government Activists	12,934	2.39	–
There is One Poland	8,239	1.52	–
Total	542,267	100.00	12
Valid votes	542,267	97.47	
Invalid/blank votes	14,062	2.53	
Total votes	556,329	100.00	
Registered voters/turnout	754,649	73.72	
Source: National Electoral Commission
