= Wiesław Szczepański =

Polish politician

Wiesław Andrzej Szczepański
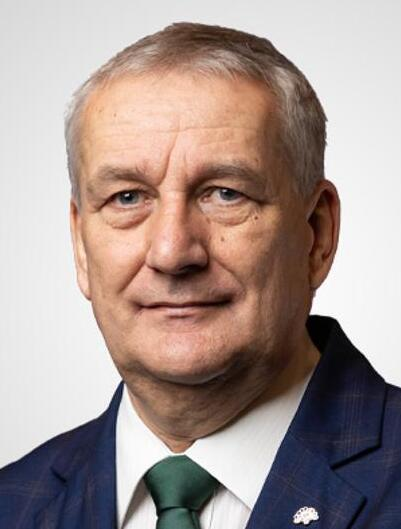
- Wiesław Szczepański in 2023

Deputy Ministry of the Interior and Administration
- Incumbent
- Assumed office 13 December 2023

Deputy of the Sejm
- Incumbent
- Assumed office 12 November 2019
- Constituency: 36 Kalisz
- In office 18 October 2005 – 7 November 2011
- Constituency: 36 Kalisz
- In office 10 May 1996 – 19 October 2001
- Preceded by: Zbigniew Gorzelańczyk (d. 1996)
- Constituency: 24 Leszno

Deputy Ministry of Infrastructure
- In office 2004 – 18 October 2005

Personal details
- Born: 1 June 1960 (age 65) Chrośnica, Polish People's Republic
- Party: New Left; Democratic Left Alliance

Wiesław Andrzej Szczepański (born 1 June 1960 in Chrośnica) is a Polish politician. He was elected to the Sejm on 25 September 2005, getting 8253 votes in 36 Kalisz district as a candidate for the Democratic Left Alliance list.

As of 2025, he has served in the Sejm 3 separate times: from 1996–2001, 2005–2011 and 2019–present.

== See also ==
- Members of Polish Sejm 2005-2007
