= Arnim =

Arnim may refer to:

== People ==
- Bettina von Arnim (1785–1859), born Elisabeth Catharina Ludovica Magdalena Brentano, German writer and novelist
- Ludwig Achim von Arnim (1781–1831), German poet and novelist
- Hans-Jürgen von Arnim (1889-1962), German general of the WWII
- Arnim (surname)

== Other uses ==
- Arnim Zola, a fictional character in the Marvel Comics universe
- 8055 Arnim
- Arnim family
