= Barbara Oliwiecka =

Polish politician and lawyer (born 1981)

- Oliwiecka in 2026.

Member of the Sejm of Poland
- Incumbent
- Assumed office 13 November 2023
- Constituency: No. 36

Member of the Kalisz City Council
- In office 22 November 2018 – 15 October 2023
- Constituency: No. 3

Personal details
- Born: Barbara Anna Paprzycka; 7 January 1977 (age 49) Warsaw, Poland
- Party: Centre Union (since 2026)
- Other political affiliations: Modern (2015); Civic Coalition (2018); Poland 2050 (2020–2026); Centre (2026)
- Children: 3
- Education: Adam Mickiewicz University in Poznań; Higher School of Banking in Wrocław
- Occupation: Politician; Businessperson; Manager; Facilitator

Barbara Anna Oliwiecka (Polish: [barˈba.ra ˈan.na ɔˈli.vjɛf.ska]; née Paprzycka, Polish: [paˈpʂɘ̟t͡s.ka]; born 7 January 1977) is a Polish politician, businessperson, manager, and facilitator. Since 2023, she is a member of the Sejm of Poland, representing the constituency no. 36, which is centered around Kalisz and Leszno in the Greater Poland Voivodeship. Oliwiecka belongs to the Centre Union party, and previously, was a member of Modern, Civic Coalition, and Poland 2050.

== Biography ==
Barbara Oliwiecka (née Paprzycka) was born on 7 January 1977 in Kalisz in the Greater Poland Voivodeship, Poland. In 2000, she graduated from the Adam Mickiewicz University in Poznań, Poland, with a master's degree in the spatial management of the local economy. In 2008, she also received a postgraduate degree in business training from the Higher School of Banking in Wrocław, Poland. Oliwiecka founded her company in an education and consulting sector, and became a director in a Kalisz-based production company.

In 2015, Oliwiecka ran for a seat in the Sejm of Poland from the constituency no. 36, centered around Kalisz and Leszno in the Greater Poland Voivodeship. She was a candidate of the Modern party. In 2018, as a member of the Civic Coalition, she was elected as a city councilor in Kalisz. She later joined the Poland 2050 party, becoming a member of its regional administration of Greater Poland Voivodeship. In 2023, Oliwiecka was elected to a seat in the Sejm from the constituency no. 36. She run on mandate of the Third Way political alliance, and received 12,214 votes (2.25%). In 2024, Oliwiecka unsuccessfully run for a seat in the European Parliament from the constituency no. 7, which consists of the Greater Poland Voivodeship. In 2026, together with several other members of the parliament, she left the Poland 2050 party, creating the Centre parliamentary group.

In May 2026, the political association Centre Poland was established, being represented by the parliamentary group. In July of the same year, it merged with the Union of European Democrats, forming the Centre Union political party. She became an party agent of Centre Union in the Greater Poland Voivodeship.

== Personal life ==
Oliwiecka has a husband and three children.

== Electoral results ==
Year	Office		Party	Constituency	Votes			Result	Ref.
Year	Office		Party	Constituency	Total	%	P.	Result	Ref.
2015	Sejm of Poland	10th	Modern	No. 36	309	0.09%	138th	Lost	
2018	Kalisz City Council	5th	Civic Coalition	No. 3	971	8.64%	3rd	Won	
2023	Sejm of Poland	11th	Third Way	No. 36	12,214	2.25%	12th	Won	
2024	European Parliament	10th	Third Way	No. 7	14,080	1.37%	11th	Lost	
