= Płoszczyna =

- Village
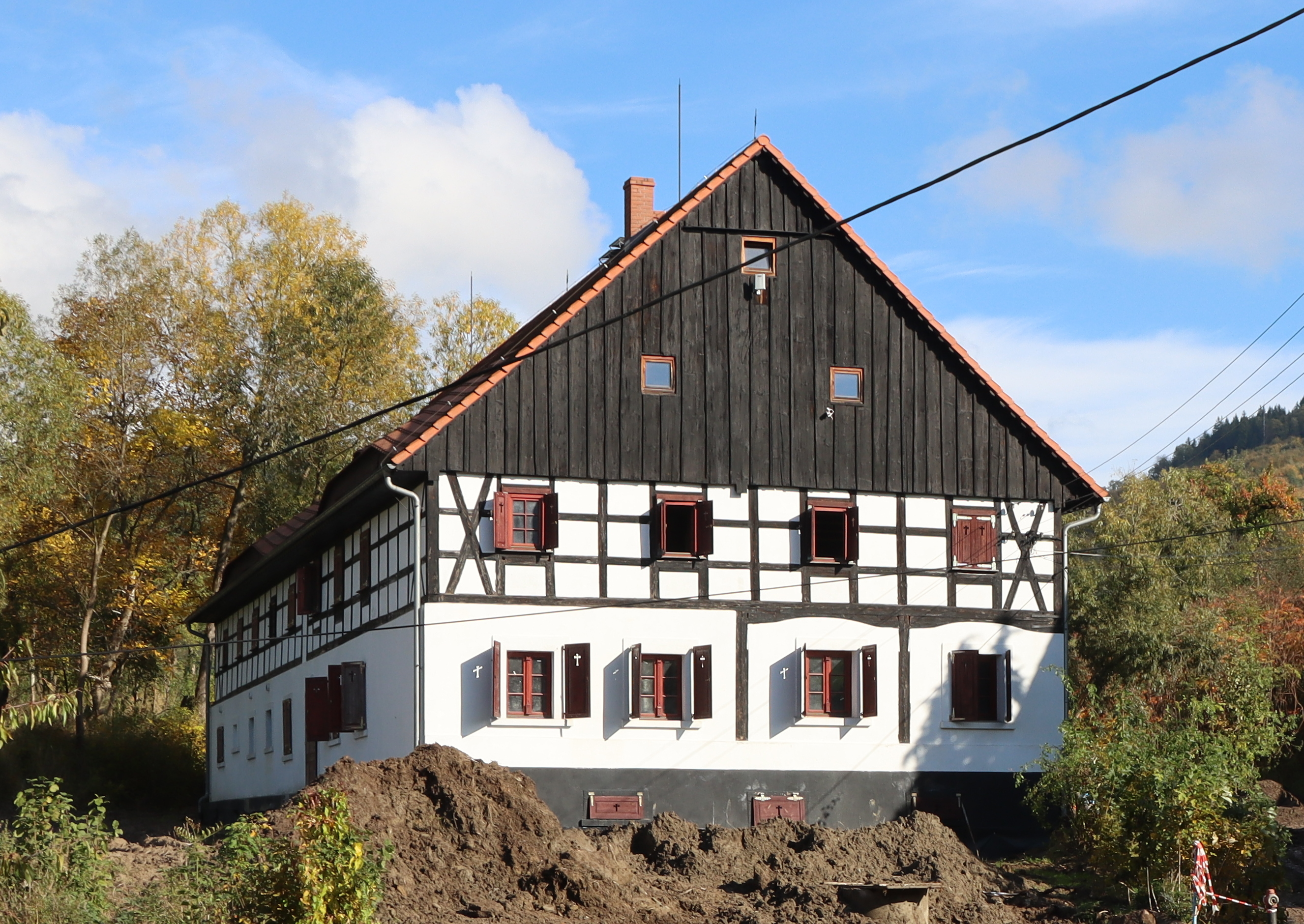
- Timber framed house

- Location within Poland
- Coordinates: 50°57′41″N 15°44′54″E
- Country: Poland
- Voivodeship: Lower Silesian
- Powiat: Karkonosze
- Gmina: Jeżów Sudecki

Płoszczyna [pwɔʂˈt͡ʂɨna] is a village in the administrative district of Gmina Jeżów Sudecki, within Karkonosze County, Lower Silesian Voivodeship, in south-western Poland.

== Gallery ==
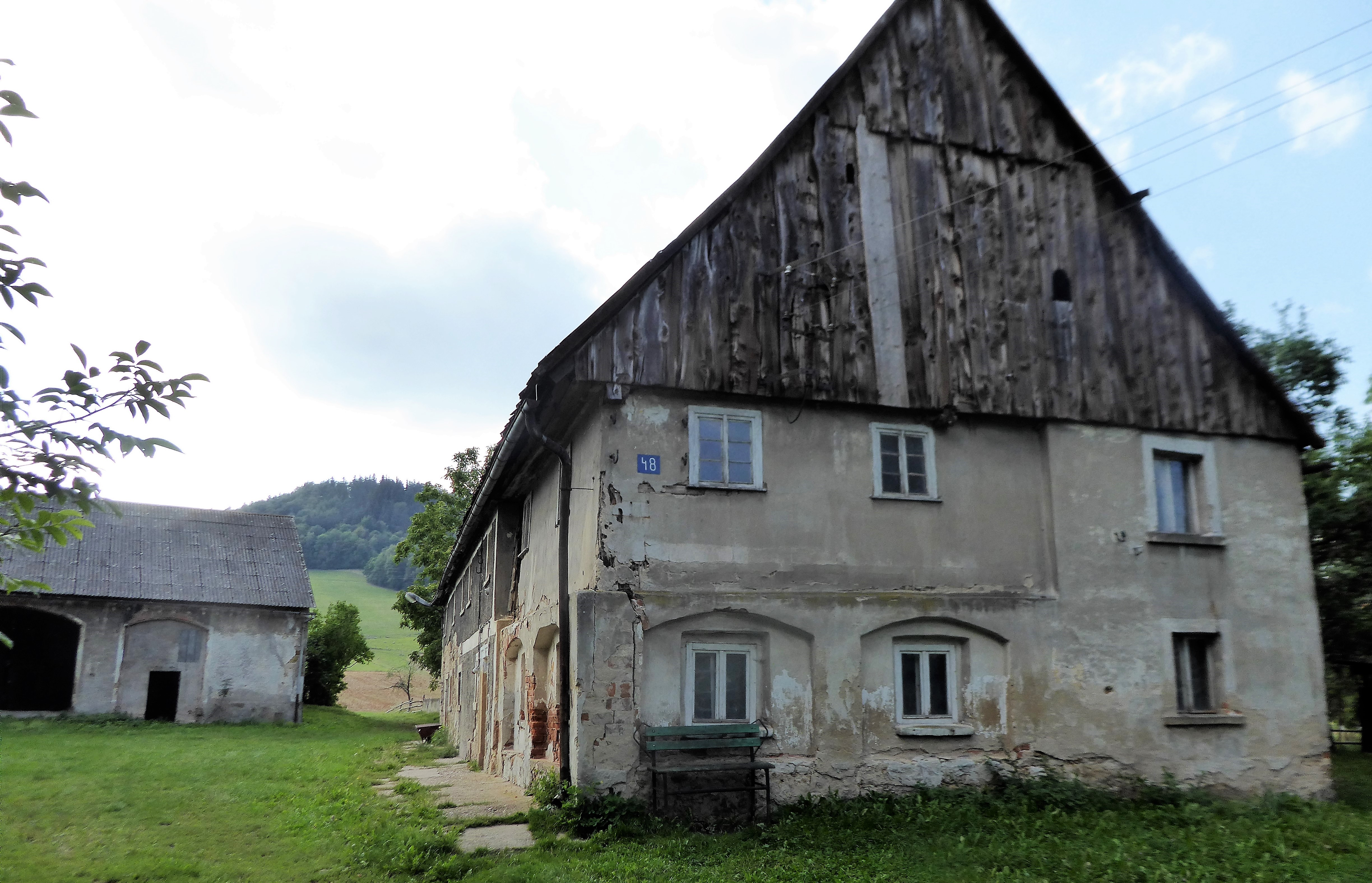
A house

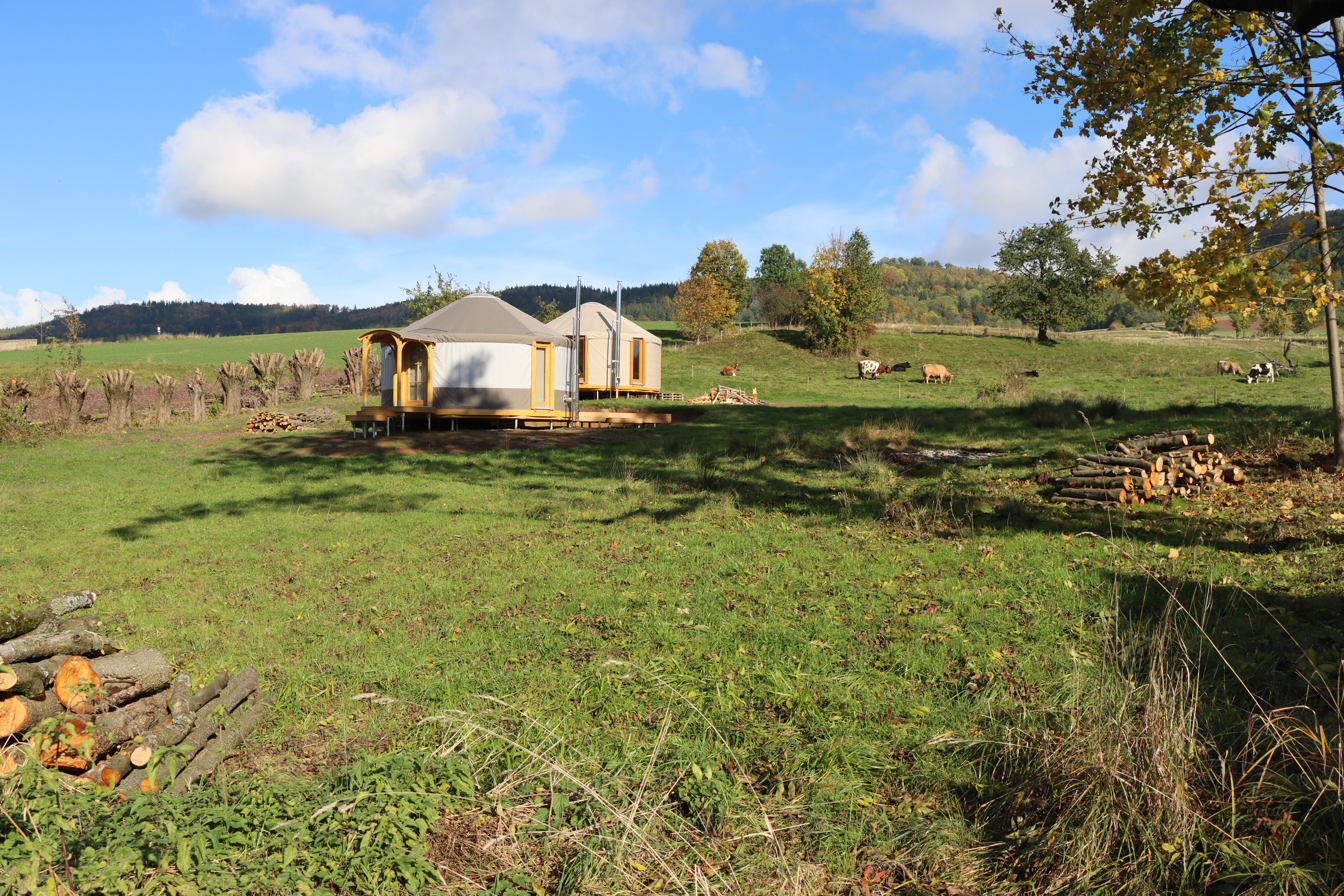
Pasture

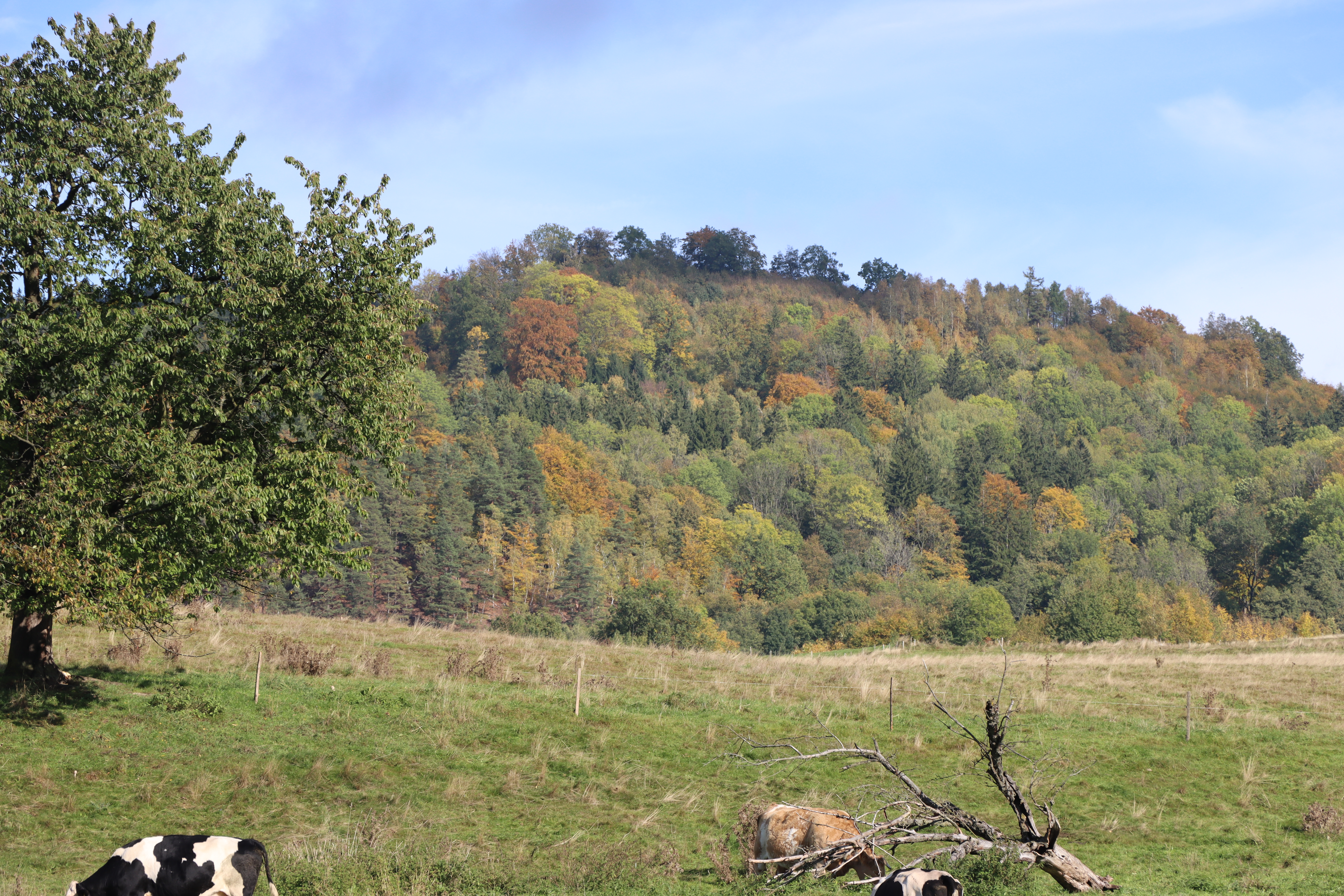
Hill, were the hillfort was excavated
