= Iris von Arnim =

German fashion designer

- Born: Monika Iris von Arnim; 25 January 1945 (age 81); Berbisdorf, Silesia (now Dziwiszów, Poland)
- Occupations: Businesswoman, fashion designer
- Years active: 1976–present
- Known for: Founding and leading Iris von Arnim
- Children: 1

Monika Iris von Arnim colloquialy Iris von Arnim (born 25 January 1945) is a German businesswoman and fashion designer noted for the knitwear brand Iris von Arnim.

== Early life and education ==
Von Arnim was born 25 January 1945 in Berbisdorf, Lower Silesia, German Reich (presently Dziwiszów, Poland), one of two children, to Hans Joachim von Arnim (1898–1961), an estate owner, and Marita von Arnim (née von Fenneberg), into a noble family.

The von Arnim family where large landowners in the Uckermark region which also included the Brandenstein manor house in Saxony-Anhalt. Her maternal grandfather, Carl Fenner von Fenneberg (1886–1944), served as Landrat in Magdeburg. After World War II, her family had to flee, and lost most of their land holdings. Ultimately she grew up in modest circumstances.

She completed her schooling in Hanover and then completed a commercial apprenticeship at a travel agency.

== Career ==
Von Arnim's career began in the early 1976 when she began knitting while recovering in a hospital from a car accident.

In 1976, von Arnim opened a small boutique in Munich, and debuted her collection at the CPD fashion fair in Düsseldorf. She formally founded her own label in 1979, when she started wholesale distribution. In the early 1980s, she revolutionized the German knitwear market with previously unknown intarsia and bold color combinations, and was among the first designers to introduce cashmere in Germany, which earned her the moniker "The Cashmere Queen." The label made its mark with novelty sweaters bearing Henri Matisse and Pablo Picasso motifs as well as designs involving race-car drivers, horseback riders, golfers and tennis players. Since 1990, her knitwear collection has been complemented by matching woven and dress collections.

Today, Iris Von Arnim delivers to over 200 exclusive boutiques and department stores globally, she has her own production site in Italy and mono stores in Munich, Vienna and Kampen, Sylt. She lives in Hamburg, Germany and heads the largest European young designer competition, the Apolda European Design Award. She supports weaving mills in Cambodia, Pakistan and Mexico.

In 2006, Valentin von Arnim, her son, joined the company. Since 2009 he has been serving general manager, in charge of operations, marketing and sales.

In 2010, Iris von Arnim formed a joint venture with Claudia Schiffer to develop the Claudia Schiffer Cashmere Collection. Schiffer is creative director and von Arnim is responsible for product development, production and sales.

In November 2012, Iris von Arnim opened a store in the city center of Munich. In June 2013, the original flagship store on the North Frisian Island of Sylt was redesigned and opened with three times the space.

In July 2013 the Iris von Arnim e-store was launched.

In August 2013 Iris von Arnim presented their first menswear collection which is called Iris von Arnim UOMO. The collection includes 15 styles, from fine knitted hoodies to chunky hand knitted sweaters and cardigans, each distinguished through particular details and craftsmanship.

In October 2013 Iris Von Arnim opened a temporary store in the center of Vienna.

== Recognition ==
In April 2011, von Arnim was awarded the Thuringian Order of Merit for her role in the Apolda European Design Award and for her support of the region.
