= Janówek, Karkonosze County =

Janówek
- Village
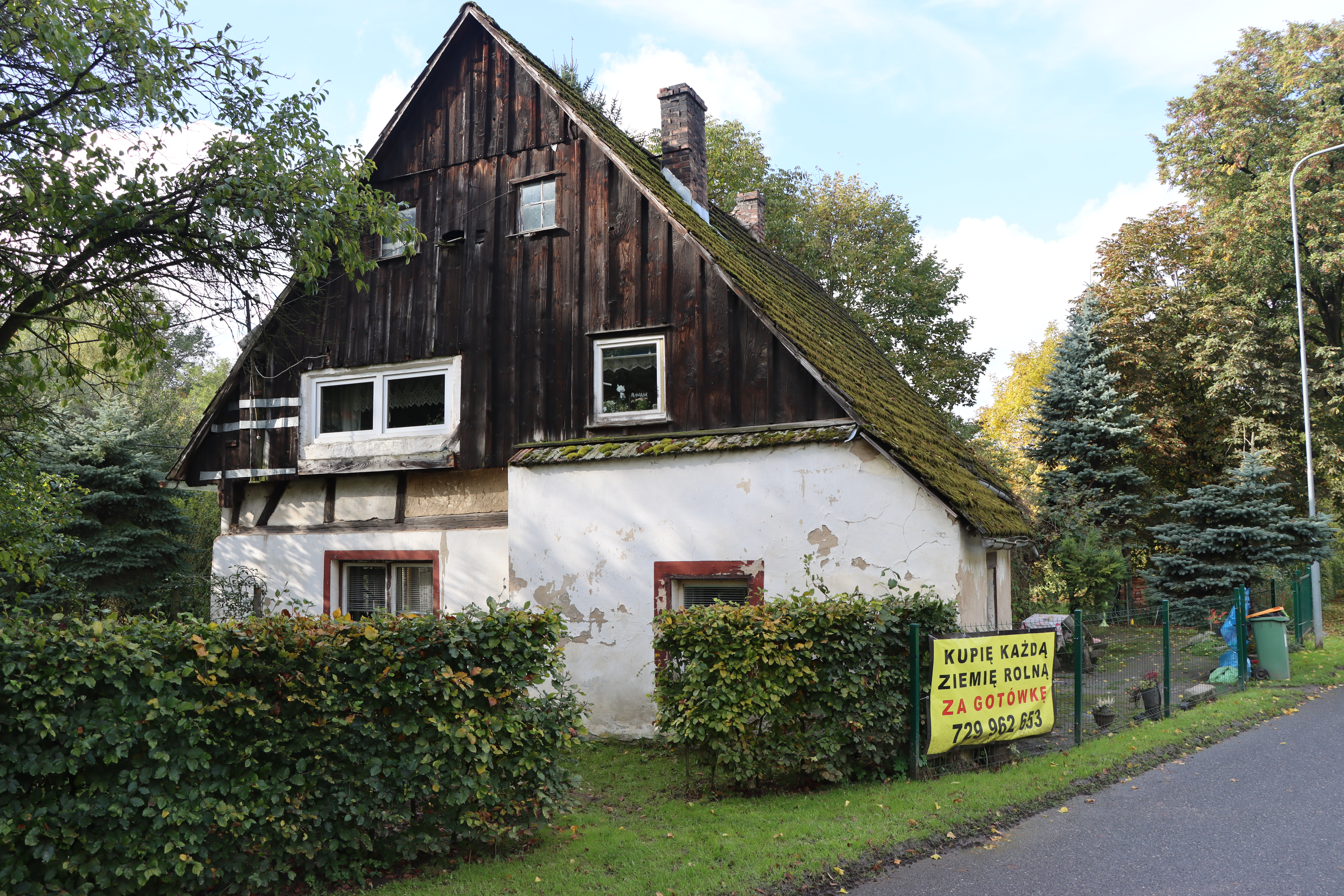
- Old house in Janówek

- Location within Poland
- Coordinates: 50°59′48″N 15°45′40″E
- Country: Poland
- Voivodeship: Lower Silesian
- Powiat: Karkonosze
- Gmina: Jeżów Sudecki

Janówek [jaˈnuvɛk] is a village in the administrative district of Gmina Jeżów Sudecki, within Karkonosze County, Lower Silesian Voivodeship, in south-western Poland.

== Gallery ==
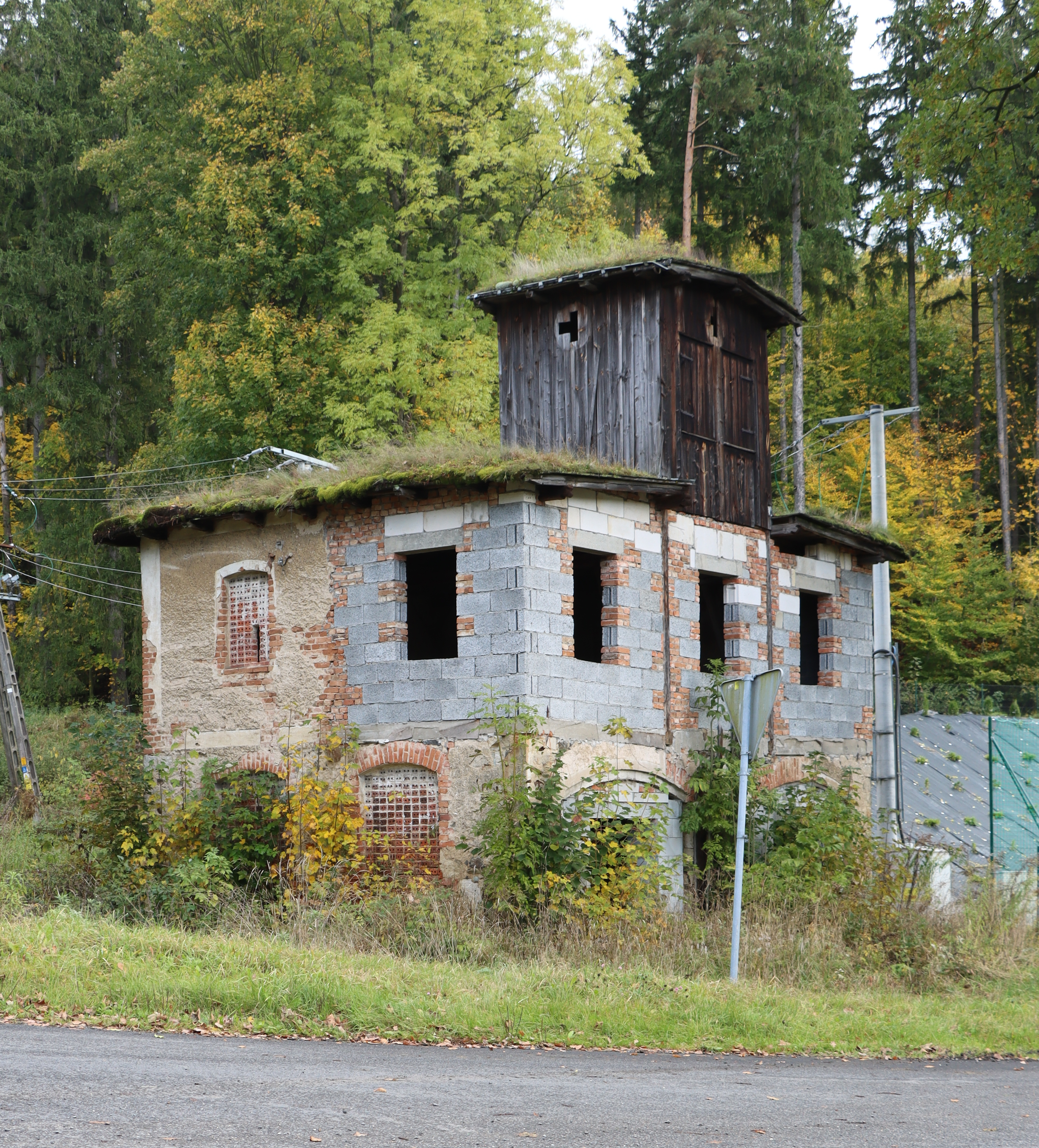
Abandoned house by the road

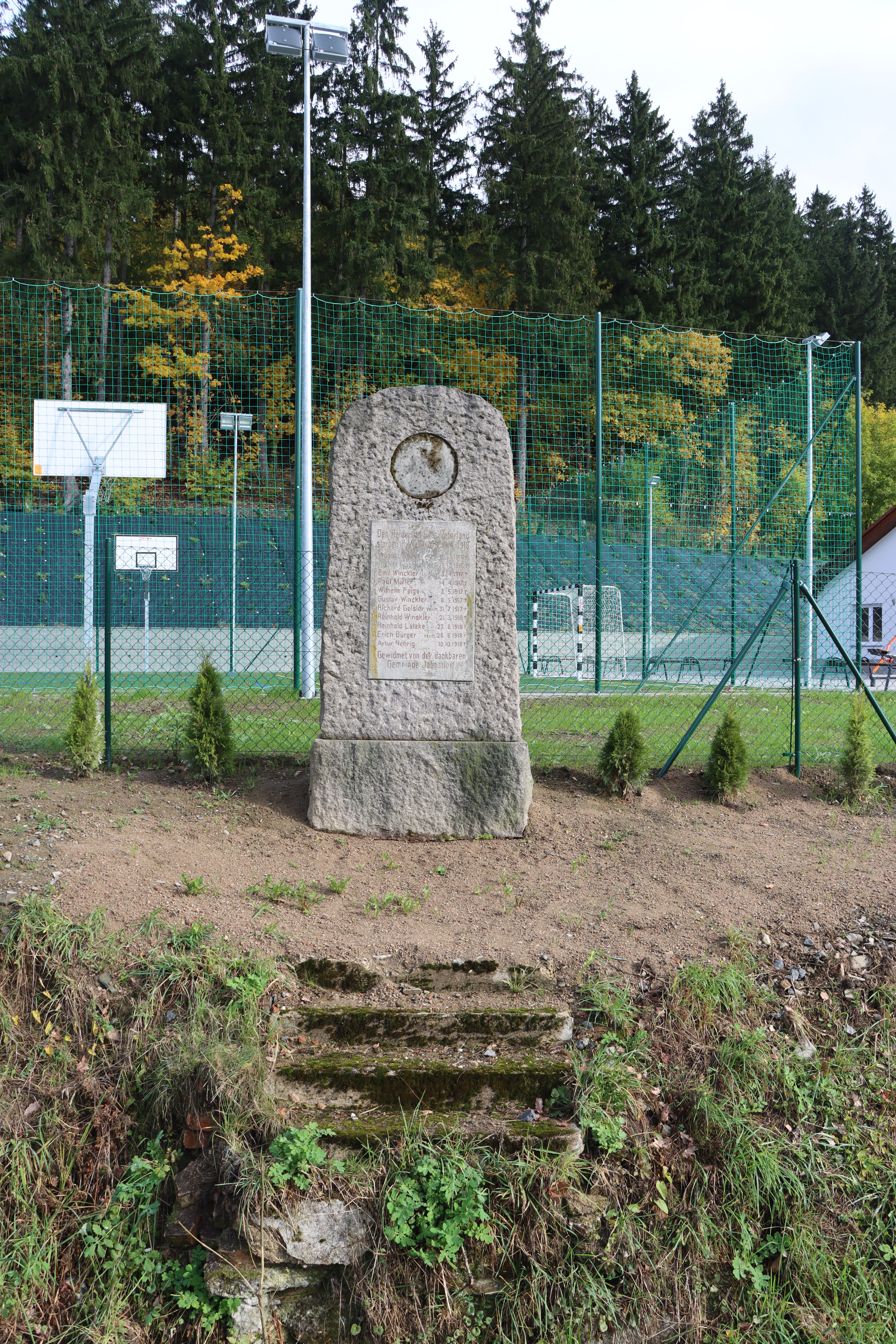
World War I memorial with a new playground (2023) behind

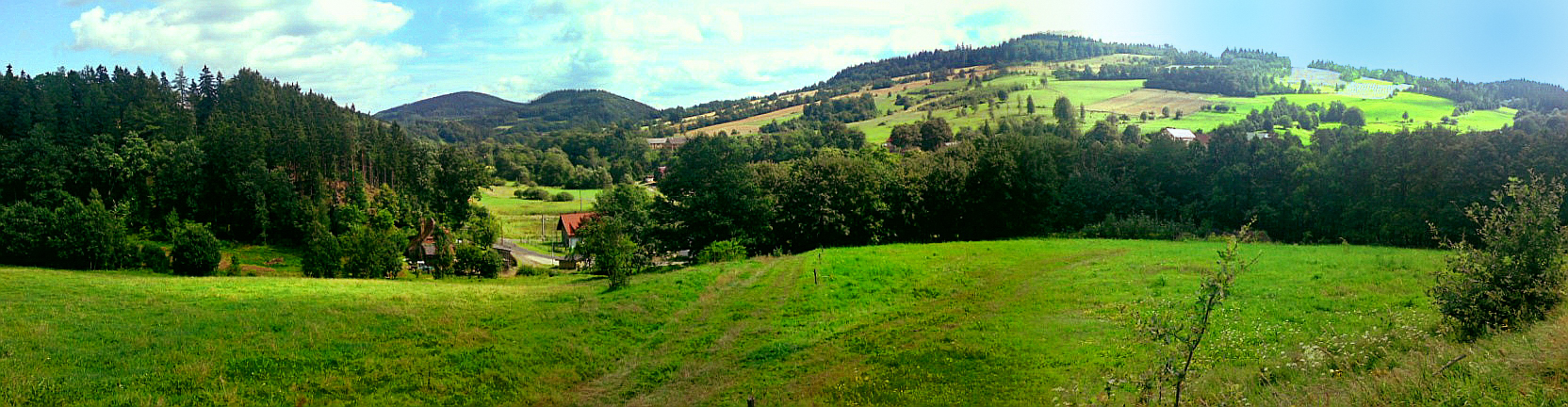
Surrounding countryside
