= Czernica, Karkonosze County =

Village in southwestern Poland

Czernica
- Village
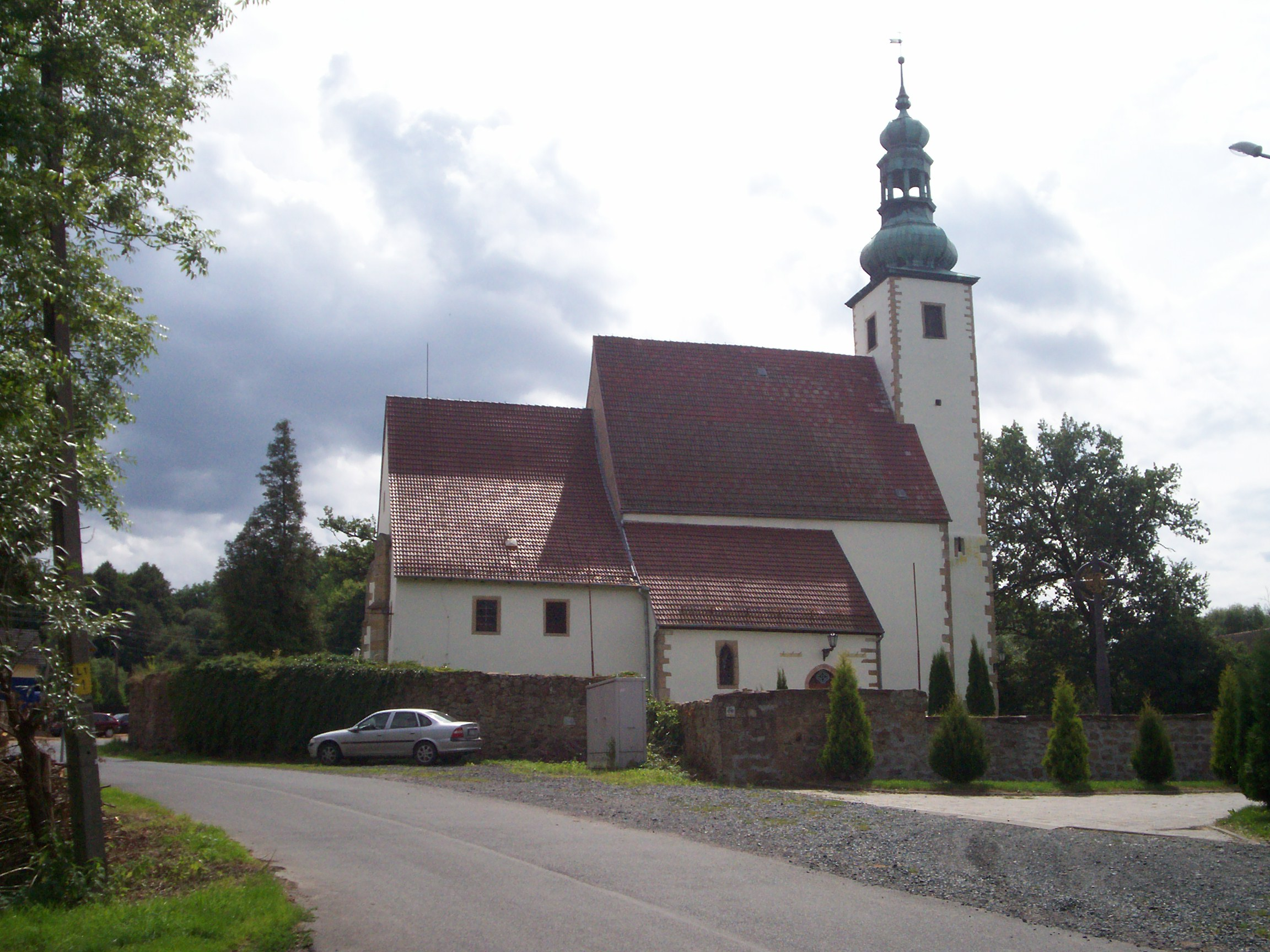
- Church of Saint Archangel Michael

- Location within Poland
- Coordinates: 50°58′38″N 15°42′51″E
- Country: Poland
- Voivodeship: Lower Silesian
- County: Karkonosze
- Gmina: Jeżów Sudecki

Czernica [t͡ʂɛrˈnit͡sa] is a village in the administrative district of Gmina Jeżów Sudecki, within Karkonosze County, Lower Silesian Voivodeship, in south-western Poland.
