= Dziwiszów =

- Village
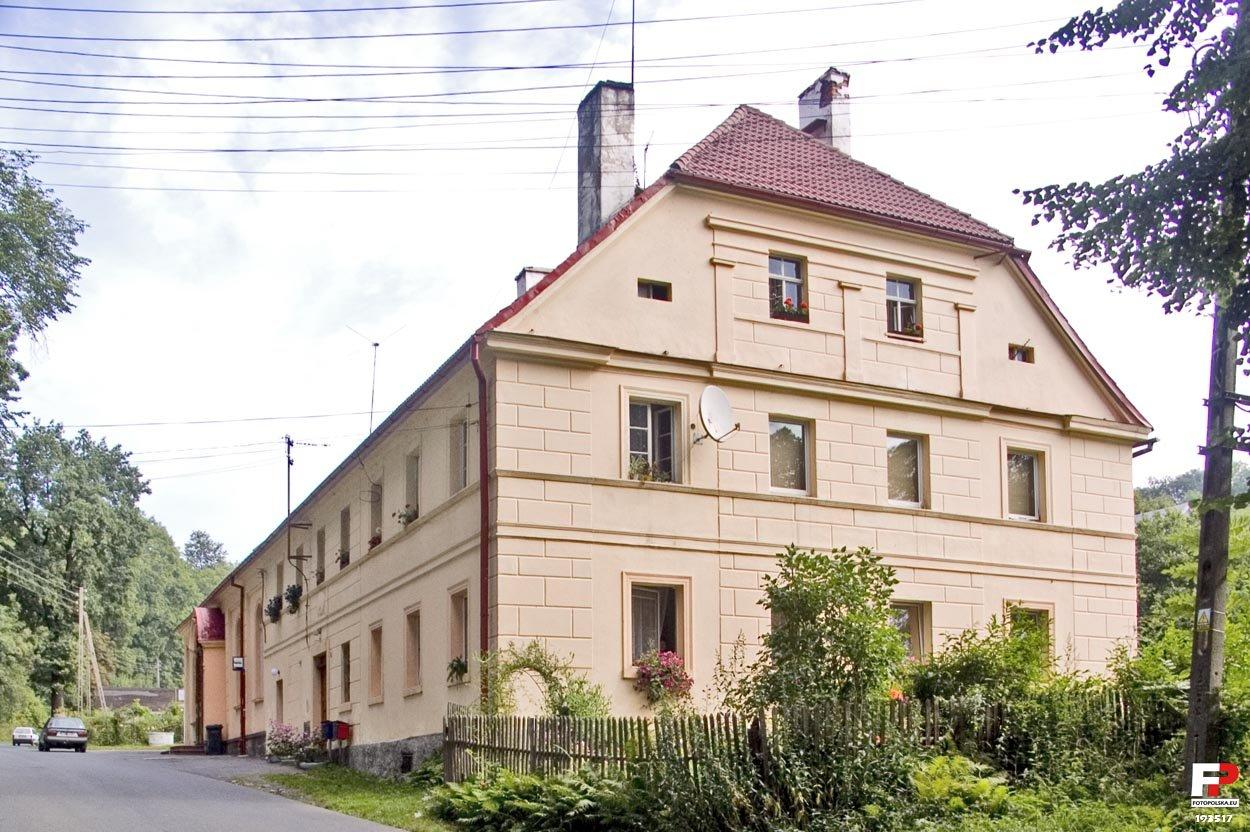

- Location within Poland
- Coordinates: 50°56′22″N 15°47′07″E
- Country: Poland
- Voivodeship: Lower Silesian
- Powiat: Karkonosze
- Gmina: Jeżów Sudecki
- Population: 1,000

Dziwiszów [d͡ʑiˈviʂuf] is a village in the administrative district of Gmina Jeżów Sudecki, within Karkonosze County, Lower Silesian Voivodeship, in south-western Poland.

== Notable residents ==
Iris von Arnim
