= Wrzeszczyn =

- Village
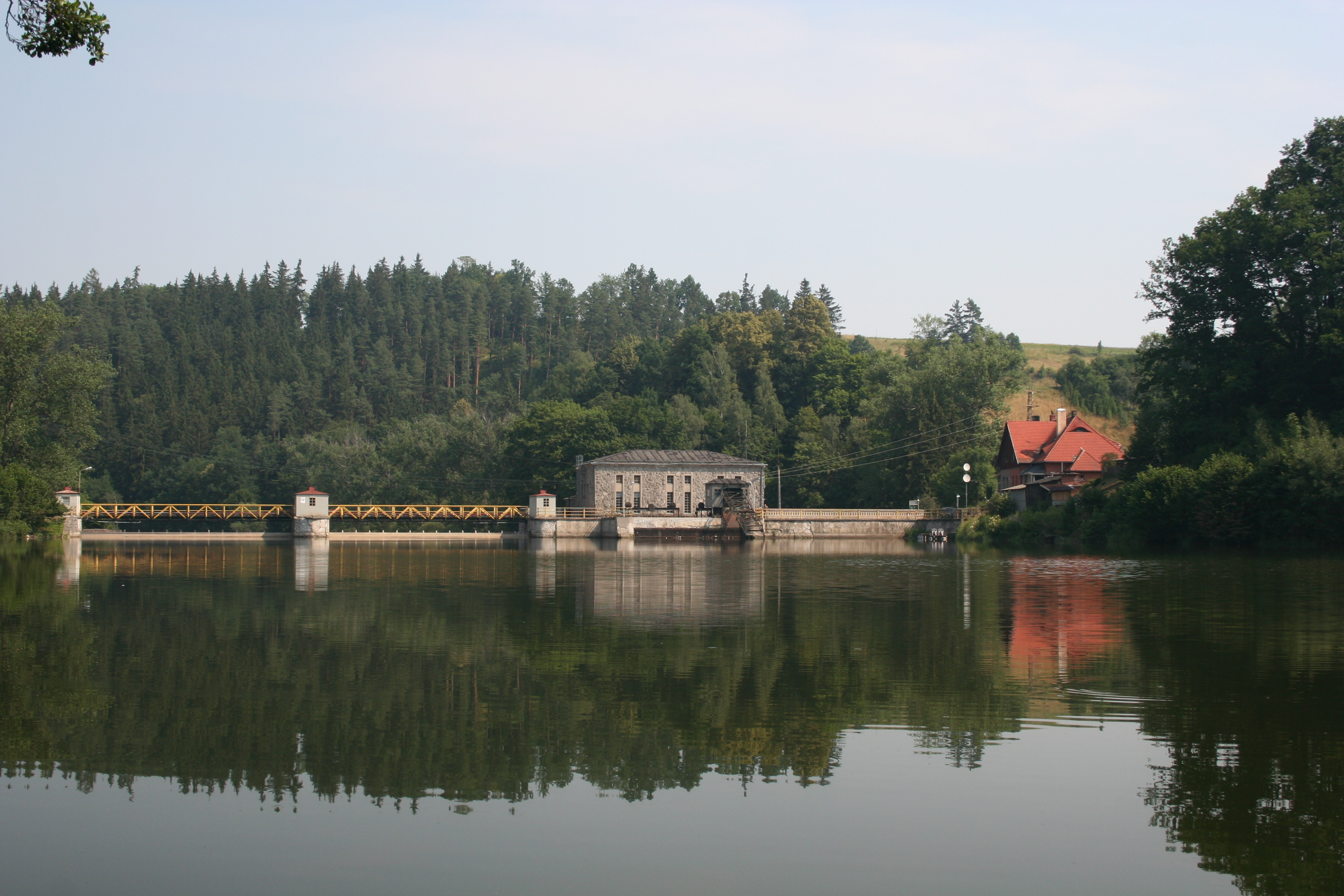
- Wrzeszczyn Dam

- Location within Poland
- Coordinates: 50°57′N 15°39′E
- Country: Poland
- Voivodeship: Lower Silesian
- Powiat: Karkonosze
- Gmina: Jeżów Sudecki

Wrzeszczyn [ˈvʐɛʂt͡ʂɨn] is a village in the administrative district of Gmina Jeżów Sudecki, within Karkonosze County, Lower Silesian Voivodeship, in south-western Poland.

== Gallery ==
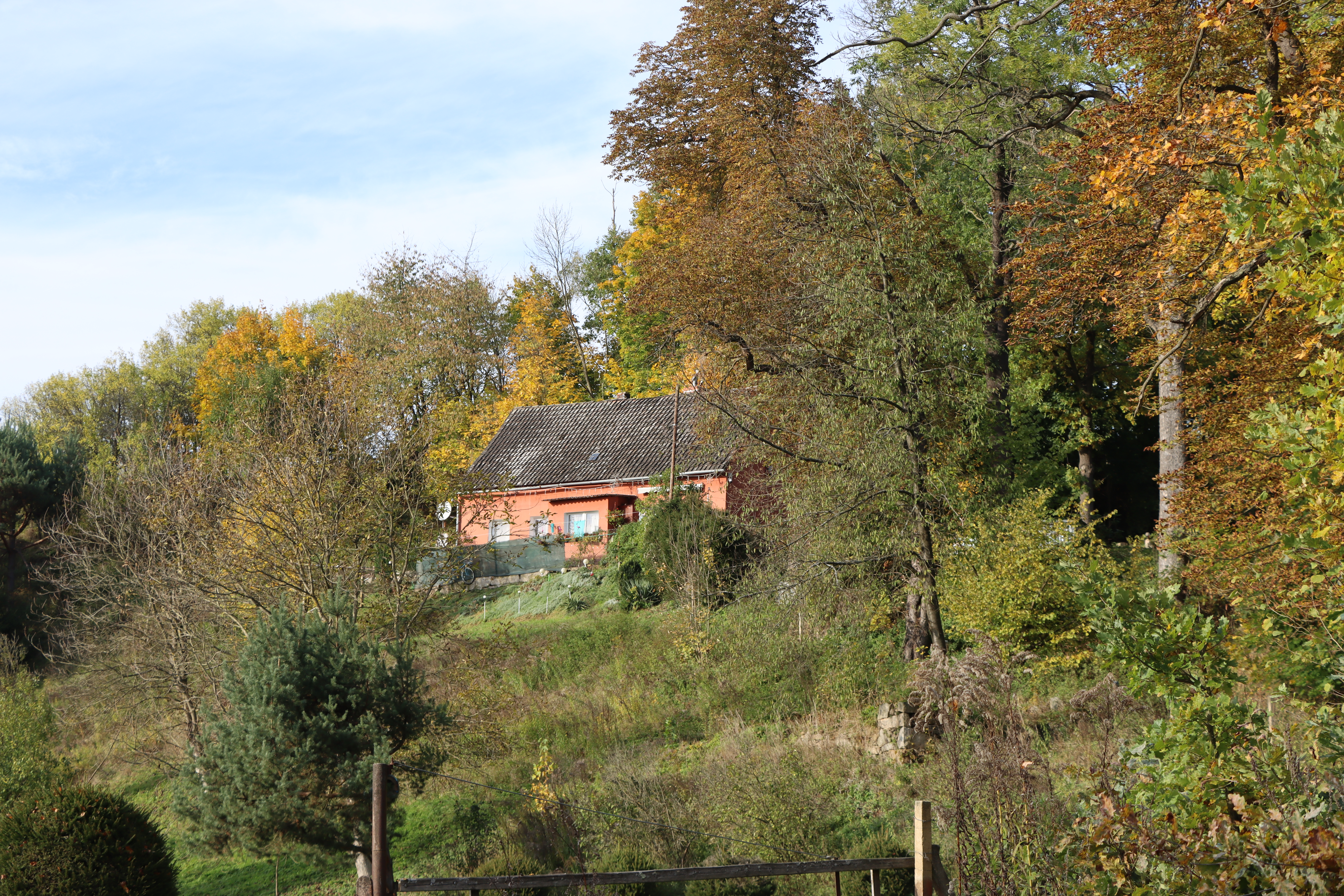
House on the slope

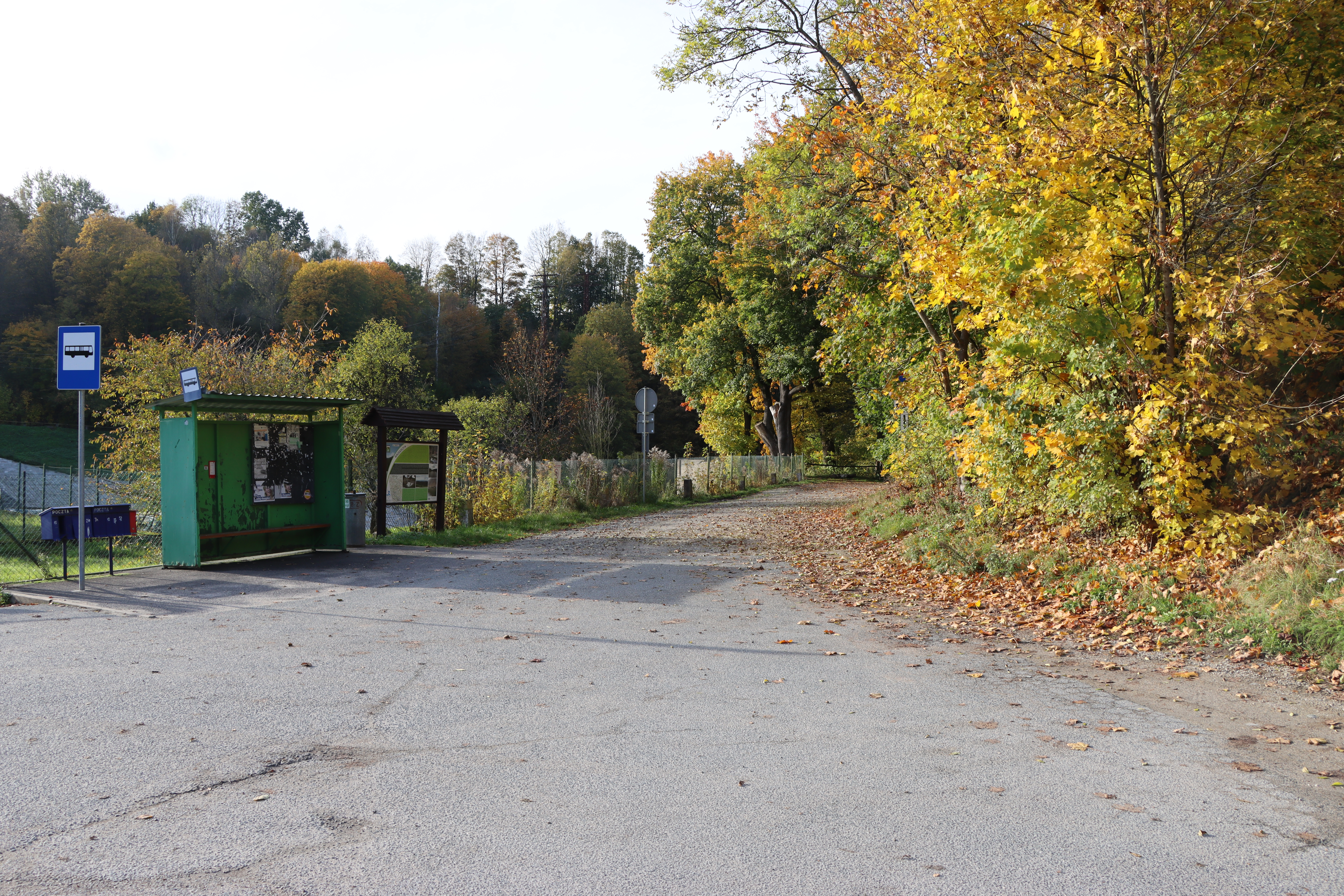
Bus stop

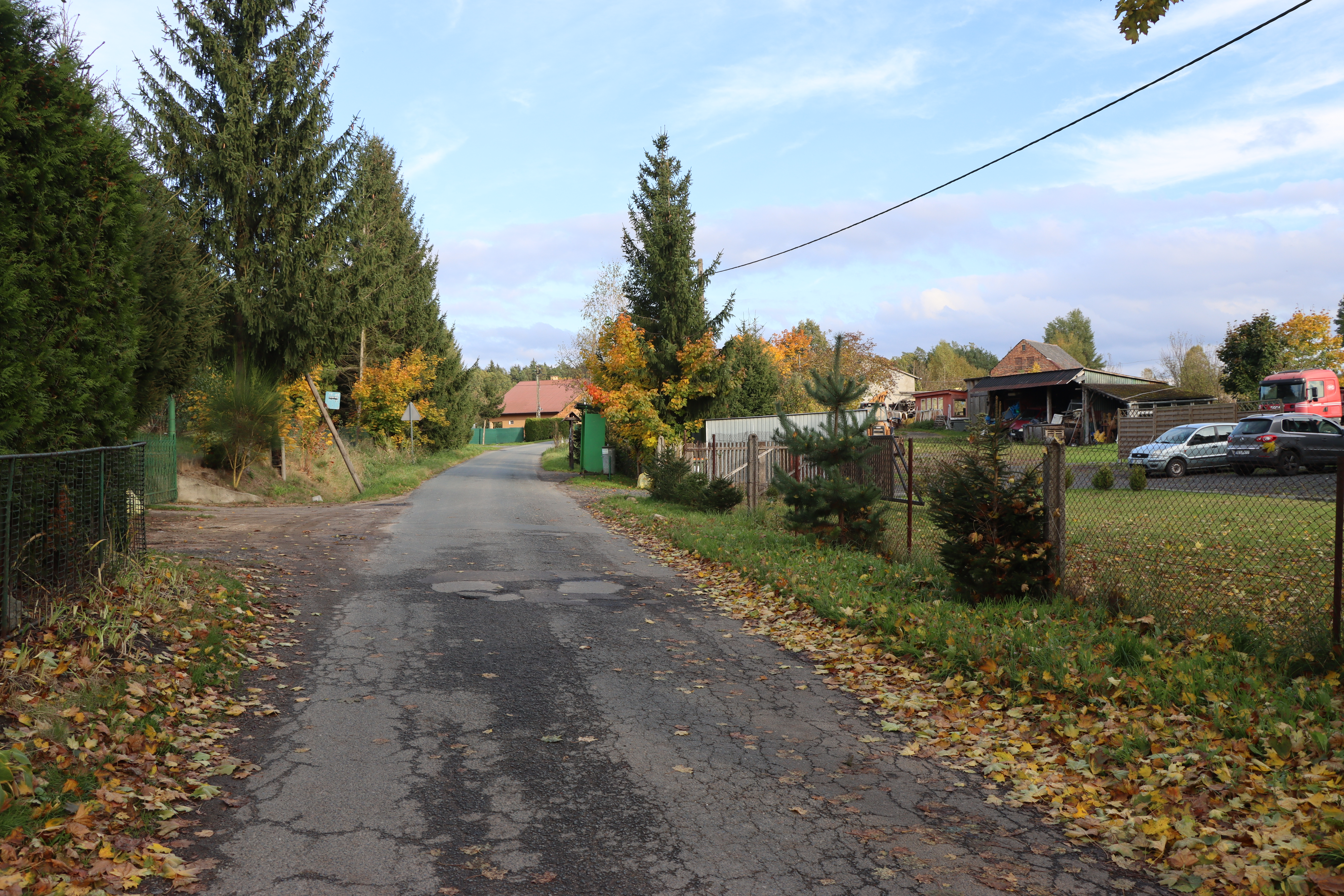
Main road
