= Arnim (surname) =

Arnim is a German surname, often preceded by the nobiliary particle "von", meaning "of". Notable people with the surname include:

- Adolf von Arnim-Boitzenburg (1832–1887), German landowner and politician
- Adolf Heinrich von Arnim-Boitzenburg (1803–1868), German statesman
- Arnulf von Arnim (born 1947), German classical pianist and teacher
- Bernd von Arnim (died 1917), German naval officer
- Bernd von Arnim (politician) (1850–1939), Prussian politician, agriculture minister
- Bettina von Arnim (1785–1859), German writer and novelist
- Daniela von Arnim (born 1964) German bridge champion
- Elizabeth von Arnim (1866–1941), British novelist
- Ferdinand von Arnim (1814–1866), German architect and watercolour-painter
- Gisela von Arnim (1827–1889), German writer
- Gustav von Arnim (1829–1909), German general of the Infantry
- Hans von Arnim (1859–1931), German philologist
- Hans von Arnim (general) (1846–1922), German general
- Hans Georg von Arnim-Boitzenburg (1583–1641), German field marshal, diplomat, and politician
- Hans-Jürgen von Arnim (1889–1962), German World War II general
- Heinrich Alexander von Arnim (1798–1861), Prussian statesman.
- Heinrich Friedrich von Arnim-Heinrichsdorff-Werbelow (1791–1859), Prussian statesman
- Harry von Arnim (1824–1881), German diplomat
- Iris von Arnim (born 1945), German fashion designer
- Karl Gustav Theodor von Arnim (1796–1877), Prussian general
- Ludwig Achim von Arnim (1781–1831), German poet and novelist

== See also ==
- Friedrich Sixt von Armin (1851–1936), German World War I general
- Hans-Heinrich Sixt von Armin (1890–1952), German World War II general
- Arnim family, German noble family
