= Deutscher Herold =

German insurance group

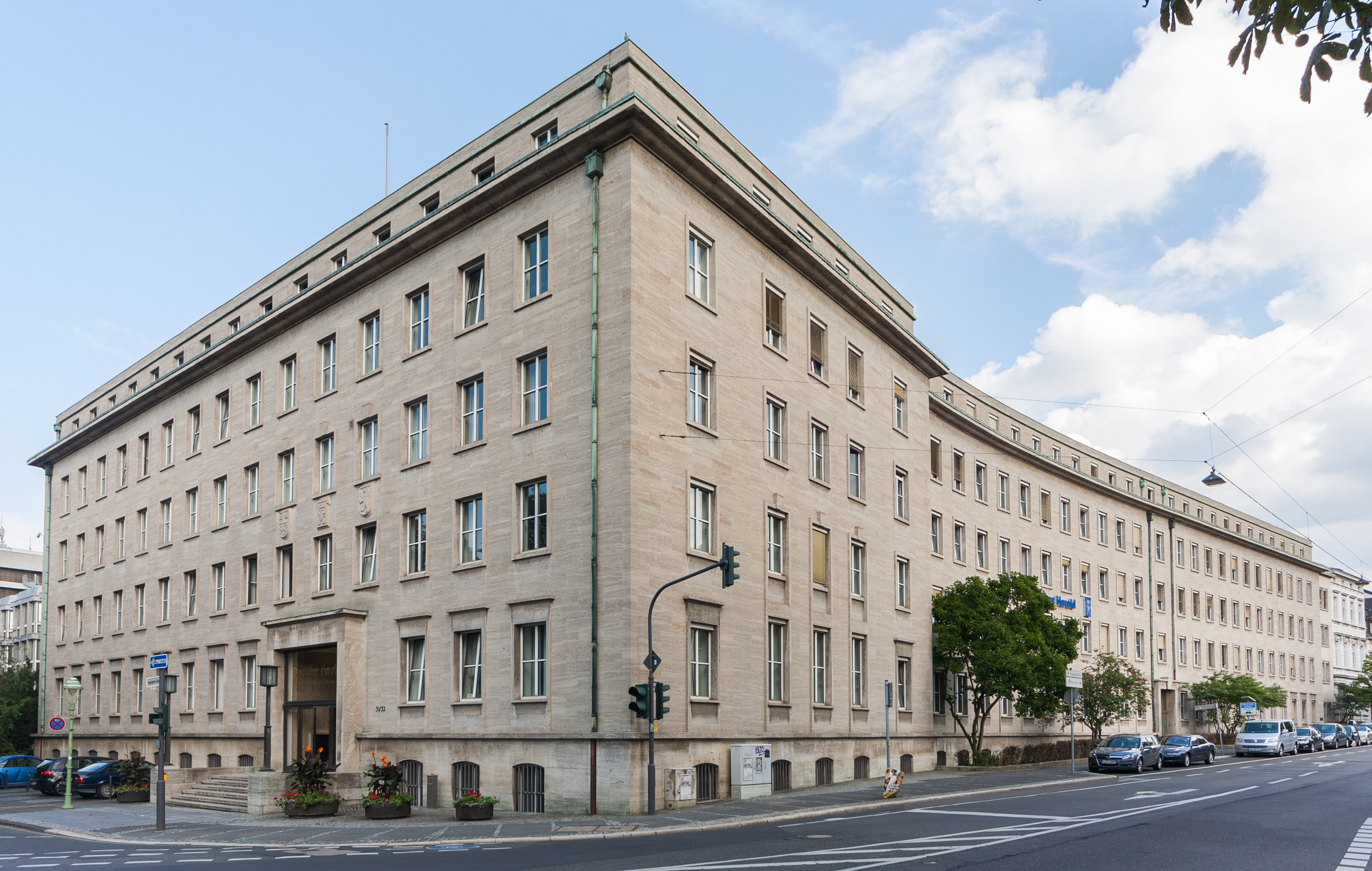
Main administration building Deutscher Herold, Poppelsdorfer Allee 31–33 (corner of Bonner Talweg), Bonn-Südstadt

Deutscher Herold Versicherungsgruppe was a German insurance group. The company, which was founded in 1922, became part of the Zurich Gruppe Deutschland in 2006, after the Zurich Insurance Group – then known as Zurich Financial Services – had already taken over the majority of the company in 2002. The name was partially retained in the new company because, on the one hand, the life insurance division is managed by Zurich Deutscher Herold Lebensversicherung AG and, on the other, the Zurich Deutscher Herold sales brand is used.

== History ==
Deutscher Herold was founded on 15 January 1922 in Berlin by the local association of undertakers under the name of the German Funeral Insurance Association as a mutual insurance association in order to enable the costs of the funeral as an insurance benefit. The funeral directors acted as agencies on the one hand, and provided insurance services in the form of funerals on the other.

After the Second World War, the company relocated to West Germany under the direction of Worch and from 1947 used Bonn as its headquarters, where it had a neoclassical office building built as the head office in 1949/50 on the corner of Poppelsdorfer Allee and Bonner Talweg. In 1950 the company, which had brokered property insurance as early as 1926, took over a property insurance company as a subsidiary, Hamburger Allgemeine-Versicherung. From then on, the group also served this line of business under the name Deutscher Herold Allgemeine-Versicherung. Worch died in 1953 and his son-in-law Willy Günther took over the management of the family-owned insurance group. In particular with a few innovations by the board member and chief mathematician Bernhard Graewe, the company strengthened its position in the German insurance market at the beginning of the 1970s and was the seventh-largest life insurer in 1976.

After Günther's death in 1976, the German Herold Insurance Group got into turmoil. On the one hand, the mismanagement that led to the bankruptcy of the entire group almost burdened the group at the reinsurer founded in 1976; on the other hand, some members of the board of management, which was at times divided, made wrong decisions with sometimes significant financial consequences. This culminated in 1984 in a claim for damages against the former chairman of the supervisory board, Gerhard Kausch, who was charged with neglecting his supervisory duties in the group.

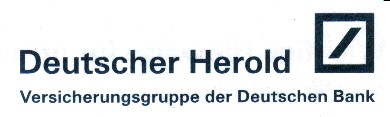
Logo after Deutsche Bank took over the majority

In early September 1992, Deutsche Bank, which a few years earlier had founded its own insurance company db-Leben, became a major shareholder with a 56 percent stake in Deutsche Herold. At the same time, the two companies agreed on a mutual cooperation, according to which the other company's products were offered via the respective sales structure.

In September 2001, Deutsche Bank confirmed negotiations with Zurich Financial Services on the acquisition of Deutscher Herold. After a few days the deal was perfect and the companies were taken over by the Swiss group.

Even after the acquisition, Zurich continued to use the former business premises of Deutscher Herold's headquarters in Bonn. In January 2015, however, the insurance company announced its intention to merge the sites in Cologne and Bonn and to construct a new company building in Cologne for this purpose, as well as to sell the buildings previously used, which were in need of renovation. In 2016, the site including the buildings was sold to Corpus Sireo, and in December 2018, the city of Bonn approved the development plan for partial demolition. After the insurance company moved out at the end of 2019, construction work began in May 2020.
