= Chrośnica, Lower Silesian Voivodeship =

Chrośnica
- Village
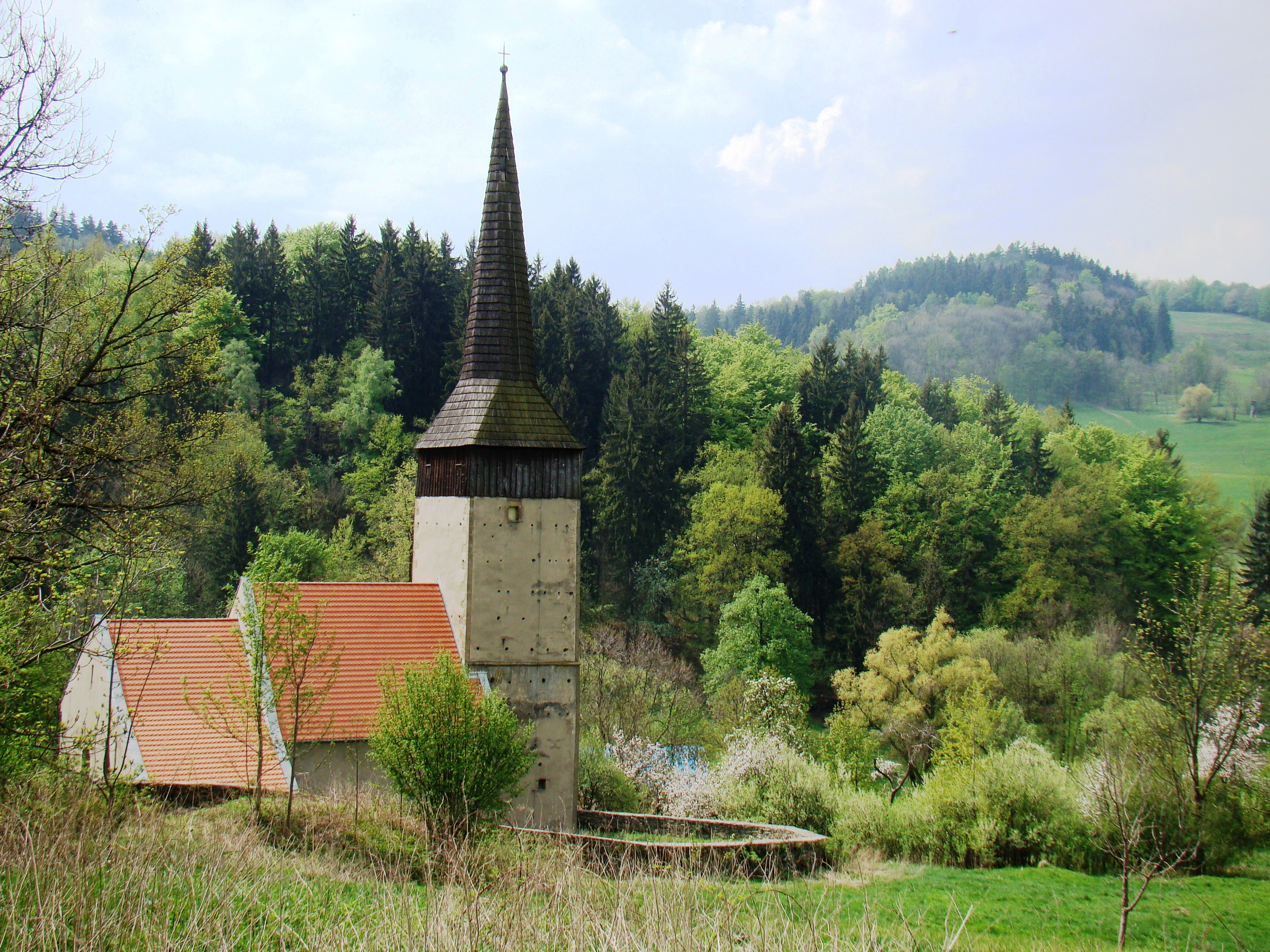
- Church of Saint Hedwig

- Location within Poland
- Coordinates: 50°58′35″N 15°47′35″E
- Country: Poland
- Voivodeship: Lower Silesian
- County: Karkonosze
- Gmina: Jeżów Sudecki

Chrośnica [xrɔɕˈnit͡sa] is a village in the administrative district of Gmina Jeżów Sudecki, within Karkonosze County, Lower Silesian Voivodeship, in south-western Poland.
