= Jan Dziedziczak =

Polish politician (born 1981)

Jan Dziedziczak MP
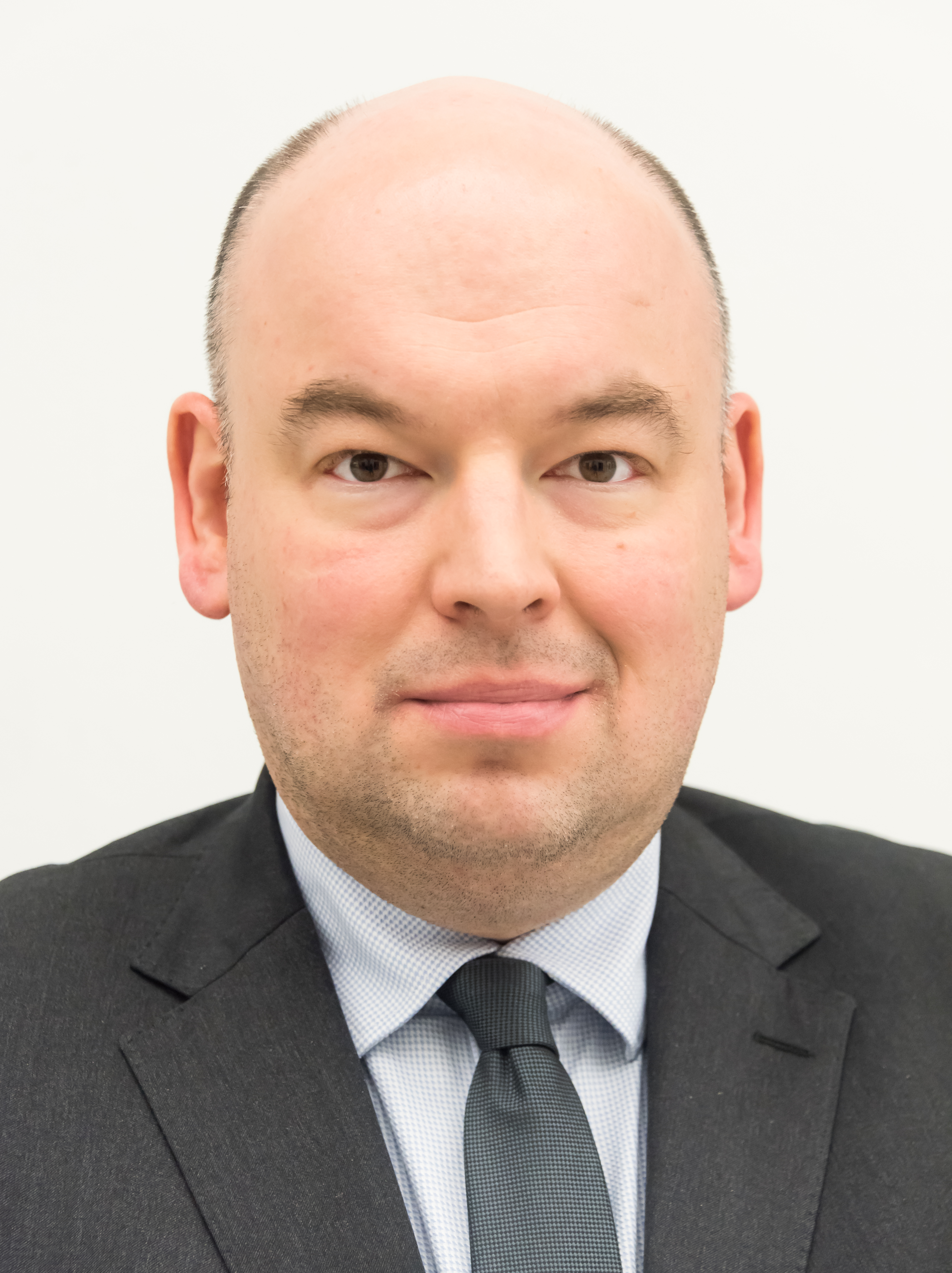
- Dziedziczak in 2023

Minister in the Chancellery of the Prime Minister
- In office 19 December 2019 – 13 December 2023
- President: Andrzej Duda
- Prime Minister: Mateusz Morawiecki

Personal details
- Born: 3 August 1981 (age 44) Warsaw
- Party: Law and Justice

Jan Michał Dziedziczak (born 3 August 1981 in Warsaw) is a Polish politician and political scientist, he was the minister in the Chancellery of the Prime Minister responsible for the Polish diaspora. from 2019 to 2023.

A graduate of the University of Warsaw, he is also a ZHR scout instructor. His career included roles as Spokesperson for the Council of Ministers and as Deputy Minister of Foreign Affairs.

== Biography ==
Dziedziczak studied at the Faculty of Political Science and International Studies of the University of Warsaw. He was active in the student union organisation, and received scholarships from the Japanese government and the United Nations University. As part of the program, Dziedziczak completed training in mass communication and communication studies. He collaborated with broadcast television networks in Japan, Australia and New Zealand.

He is a Scouting Association of the Republic instructor with the highest rank attainable. He worked with ZHR on media relations. He was later hired by the Leader of the Law and Justice party, Jarosław Kaczyński. Dziedziczak was tasked with shaping Kaczyński's public image.

He was the Spokesperson for the Council of Ministers during the premiership of Kaczyński, in office from 14 July 2006 to 4 November 2007. He has been an MP since 2007.

He was appointed as Deputy Minister of Foreign Affairs. In this role, Dziedziczak was responsible for the Polish diaspora, consular and parliamentary affairs as well as public diplomacy and cultural diplomacy. He held the post from 17 November 2015 to 3 April 2018.

On 19 December 2019 he received a ministerial appointment with the Chancellery of the Prime Minister, where he is in charge of issues pertaining to Poles and people of Polish heritage outside Poland.

Dziedziczak is a member of the Knights of Columbus.
