= Siedlęcin =

- Village
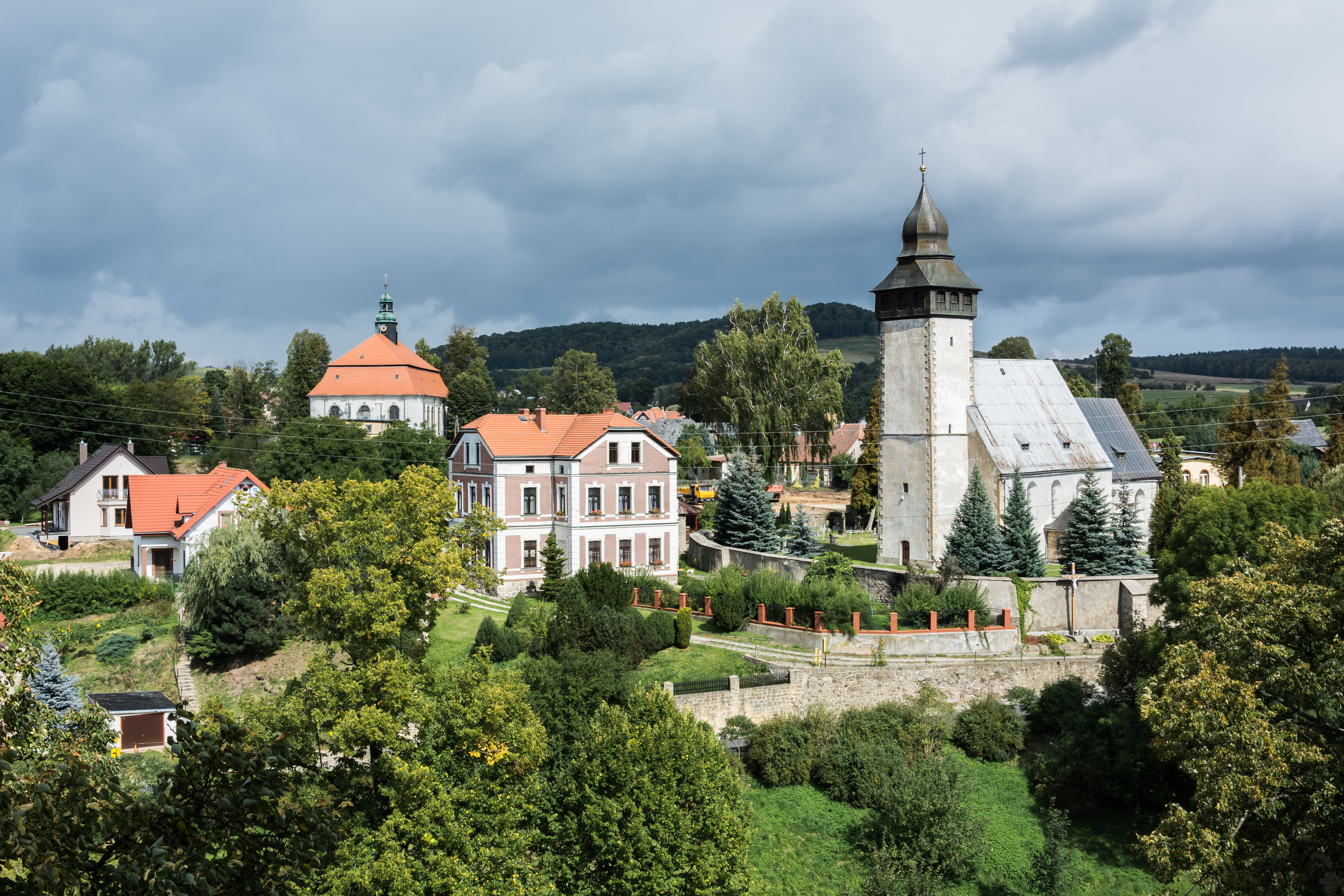

- Location within Poland
- Coordinates: 50°55′58″N 15°40′42″E
- Country: Poland
- Voivodeship: Lower Silesian
- Powiat: Karkonosze
- Gmina: Jeżów Sudecki
- First mentioned: 1305

Siedlęcin ([ɕɛdˈlɛnt͡ɕin]) (German: Boberröhrsdorf) is a village in the administrative district of Gmina Jeżów Sudecki, within Karkonosze County, Lower Silesian Voivodeship, in south-western Poland.

The river Bóbr runs through the lower part of the village.

== History ==
The area became part of the emerging Polish state in the 10th century. The village was first mentioned in 1305, when it was part of fragmented Piast-ruled Poland.

During World War II, the German administration operated a forced labour camp mostly for British, but also for French and other prisoners of war in the village.

== Sights ==
The most important historical monument in Siedlęcin is the 14th century Siedlęcin Tower.

The Perła Zachodu mountain hut of the Polish Tourist and Sightseeing Society is located in Siedlęcin.

== Transport ==
There is a railway station in Siedlęcin.
