= Arnulf von Arnim =

German classical pianist and teacher

Arnulf von Arnim (born 1947 in Hamburg) is a German classical pianist and professor.

Von Arnim studied in Germany and France and attended classes by Claudio Arrau and Wilhelm Kempff. He is the winner of several prizes - Viotti (Vercelli), Busoni (Bolzano). He has recorded concertos and sonatas by Schubert, Schumann, Liszt and others. He appears often as a jury member at major international piano contests.

In 1988, he started the Accademia Internazionale Estiva di Cervo with his wife Elfe, a meeting forum for young musical talents from all over the world, who attend master classes held by prestigious international musicians every September 1 to 12.
