= Paseky nad Jizerou =

- Municipality
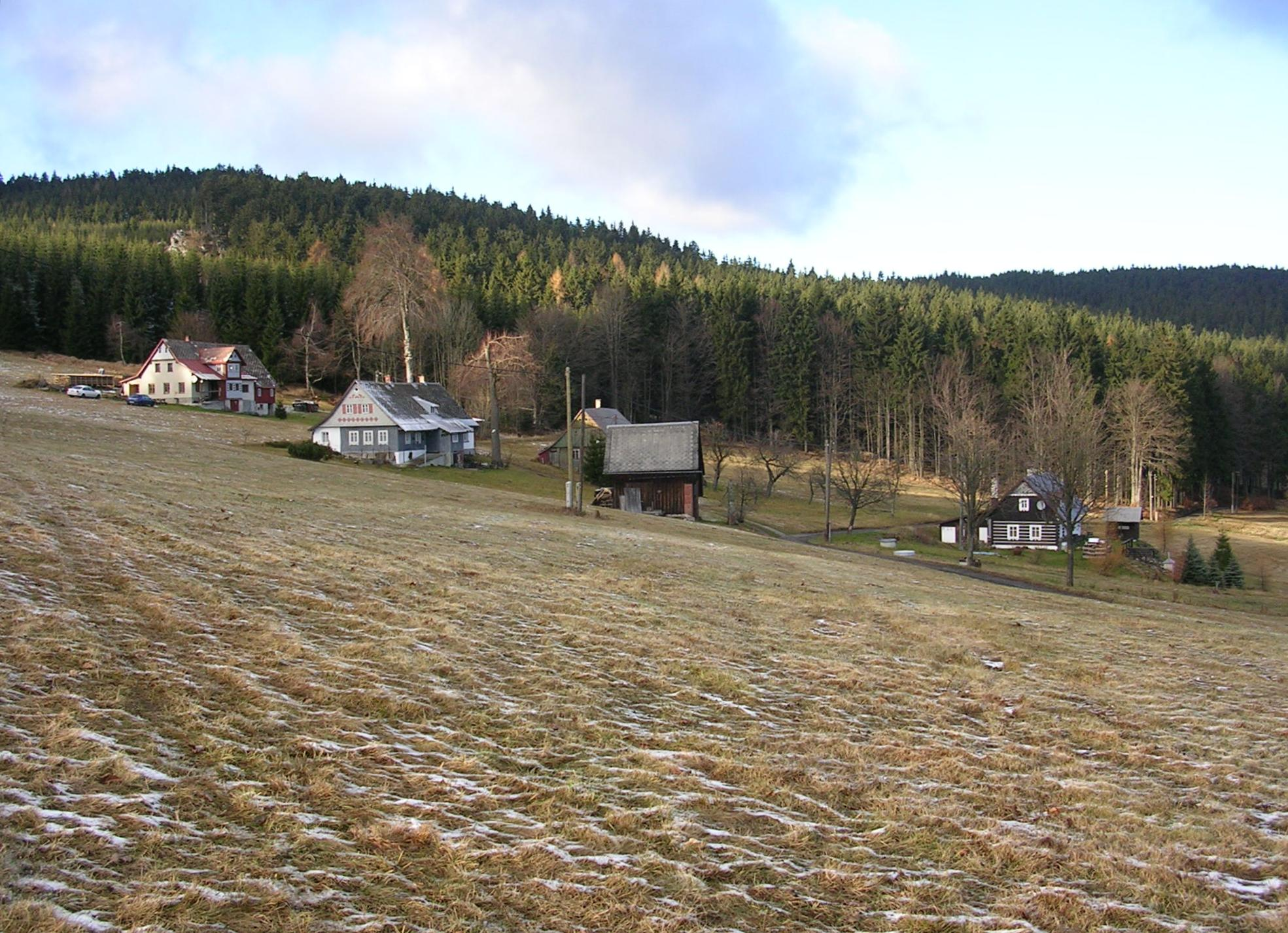
- View from the village

- Flag Coat of arms

- Location in the Czech Republic
- Coordinates: 50°43′27″N 15°24′4″E
- Country: Czech Republic
- Region: Liberec
- District: Semily
- First mentioned: 1713

Area
  - Total: 12.71 km^{2} (4.91 sq mi)
- Elevation: 675 m (2,215 ft)

Population (2026-01-01)
  - Total: 251
  - Density: 19.7/km^{2} (51.1/sq mi)
- Time zone: UTC+1 (CET)
  - Summer (DST): UTC+2 (CEST)
- Postal code: 512 47
- Website: www.paseky.cz

Paseky nad Jizerou is a municipality and village in Semily District in the Liberec Region of the Czech Republic. It has about 300 inhabitants.

== Demographics ==
Historical population
Year	Pop.	±%
1869	1,516	—
1880	1,492	−1.6%
1890	1,439	−3.6%
1900	1,340	−6.9%
1910	1,305	−2.6%
1921	1,019	−21.9%
1930	1,044	+2.5%
1950	595	−43.0%
1961	539	−9.4%
1970	428	−20.6%
1980	367	−14.3%
1991	293	−20.2%
2001	256	−12.6%
2011	243	−5.1%
2021	255	+4.9%
Source: Censuses
