= Jarosław Urbaniak =

Polish politician

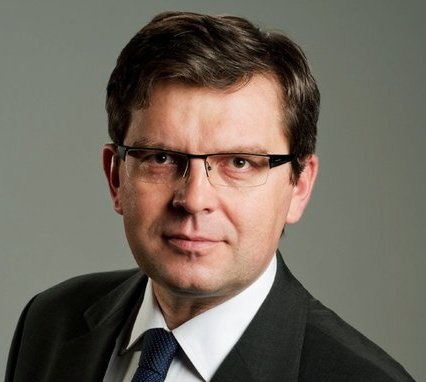

member of Sejm 2005-2007
- Incumbent
- Assumed office 25 September 2005

Personal details
- Born: 1966 (age 59–60)
- Party: Civic Platform

Jarosław Piotr Urbaniak (born 7 August 1966 in Ostrów Wielkopolski) is a Polish politician. He was elected to the Sejm on 25 September 2005, getting 7,400 votes in 36 Kalisz districts as a candidate from the Civic Platform list.

== See also ==
- Members of Polish Sejm 2005-2007
