= Siedlęcin Tower =

Ducal Tower in Siedlęcin
- Wieża książęca w Siedlęcinie
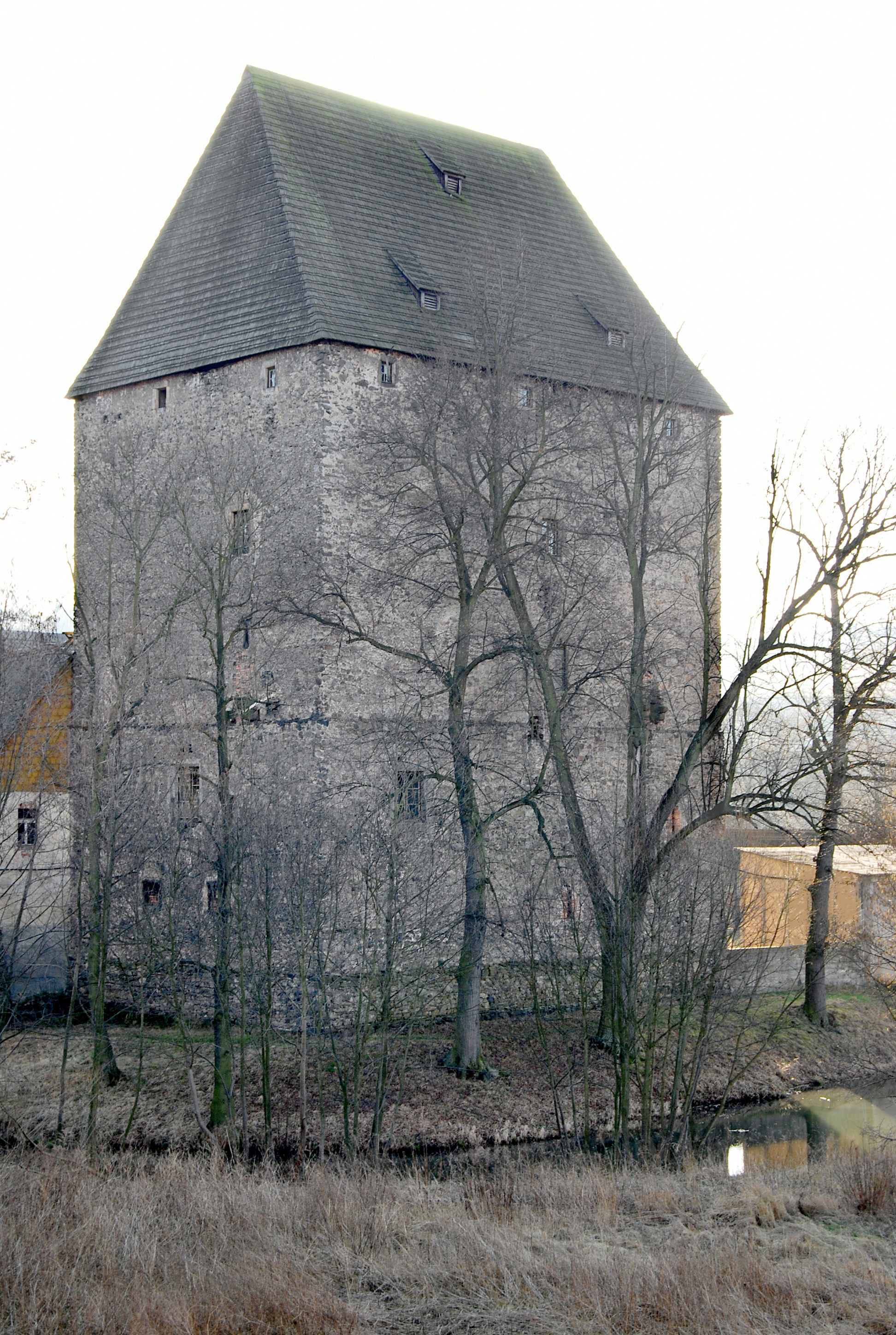

- Location within Poland

General information
- Type: Tower castle
- Architectural style: Gothic
- Location: Siedlęcin, Poland
- Coordinates: 50.935°N 15.6856°E
- Construction started: 1313
- Completed: 1315
- Client: Henry I of Jawor

Siedlęcin Tower (Polish: Wieża książęca w Siedlęcinie) is a 14th-century tower castle situated in the southwestern Polish village of Siedlęcin in the Karkonosze County, in the Lower Silesian Voivodeship.

The keep in Siedlęcin is one of the best-preserved examples of such buildings in Central Europe; its construction was probably started in 1313 by Henry I of Jawor. He and his wife Agnes of Bohemia also commissioned the medieval Gothic fresco murals depicting the legend of Lancelot that are painted in the great hall of the keep.

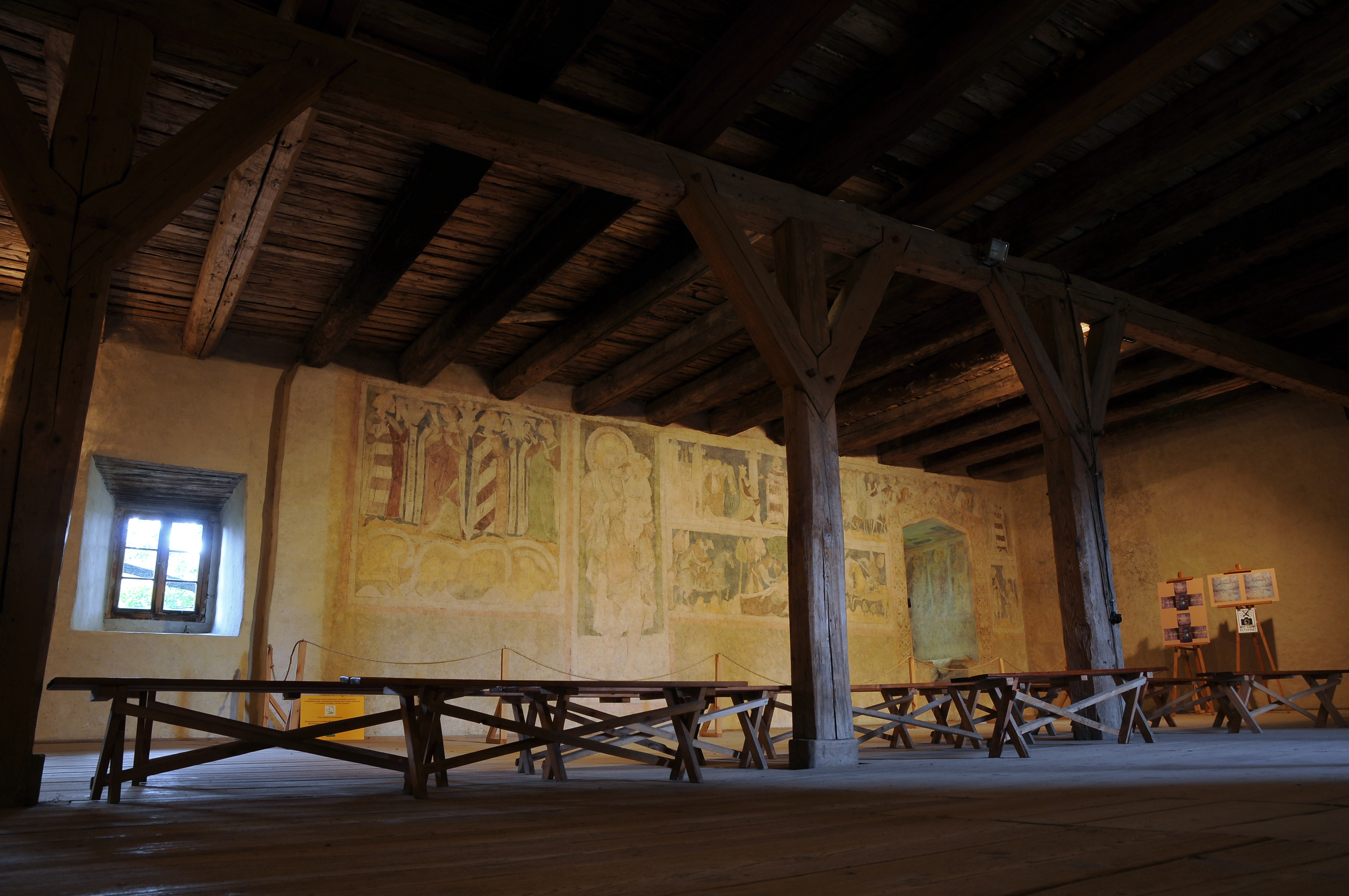
Part of the Gothic paintings inside the tower

== Description ==
The tower, surrounded by a moat, is a keep of a relatively modest sort, which combines the functions of housing, ceremony, and defence in a vertical disposition analogous to those found in other castles in Europe: the lower storeys were designed for defence and for trade and business; the upper floors consisted of living quarters, and fulfilled the ceremonial functions of the dukes; the topmost floor served watching purpose and later for seed stocking.

== History ==
The history of the Siedlęcin Tower is tightly related to the history of the Piast Dynasty, which ruled over Poland from 960 to 1370. Initially the property of Henri I of Jawor, the tower was built between 1313 and 1315 close to the river Bóbr, in one of the most gold-bearing regions of Europe back then. The second owner was his nefew, Bolko II the Small, duke of Swidnica. After his death, his widow, the duchess Agniezka sold the tower to the courtier Jenchin von Redern. His family kept the tower until the mid 15th century. For the following centuries, the tower had several owners and numerous changes were applied to the building. During the 18th century, it became the property of the von Schaffgotsch's family, who kept it until 1945. During the post-war period, after the redefinition of the borders with Germany, many families were brought from eastern Poland to live in the tower. These families stayed there until the beginning of the 21st century.

=== List of the owners of the tower ===
- 1313-1346 | Henri Ist of Jawor
- 1346-1368 | Bolko II the Small
- 1368-1369 | Agnes of Habsbourg
- ca.1369-1409 | Von Redern Family
- 1409-1437 | Von Schellendorf Family
- 1437-1452 | Von der Wieze Family
- 1453-1454 | Von Zedlitz Family
- 1454-1622 | Von Nimptsch Family
- 1622-1653 | Princes Legnicko-Brzescy
- 1653-1945 | Von Schaffgotsch Family
