= Christina Schultheiß =

German civil engineer, active in the Protestant church

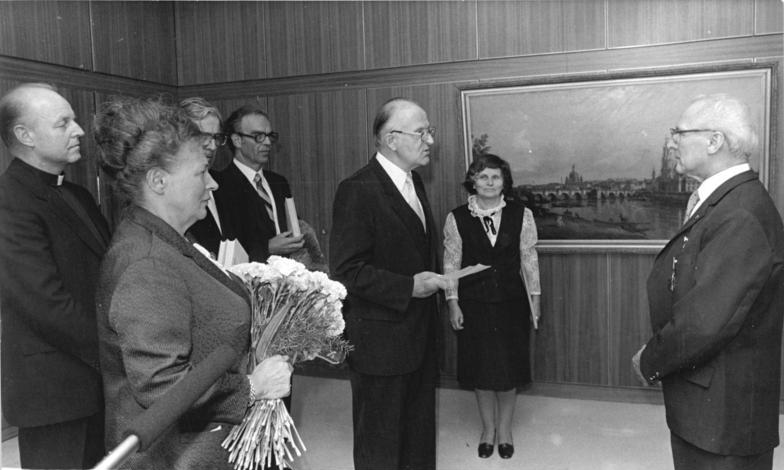
- From left to right: Bishop Werner Leich, Christina Schultheiss, Joachim Rogge, Oberkirchenrat Ernst Petzold, Bishop D. Dr Werner Krusche, Oberkirchenrätin Christa Lewek and Erich Honecker
- Born: Christina Fiedler; 27 June 1918; Chemnitz
- Died: March 26, 2016 (aged 97); Triptis-Pillingsdorf
- Occupation: civil engineer
- Known for: Role in Protestant church in East Germany

Christina Schultheiß (27 June 1918 – 26 March 2016) was a German civil engineer, best known for her involvement in the Protestant church. She was president of the Thuringian state synod from 1978 to 1990, a member of the synods of the Federation of Protestant Churches of the German Democratic Republic, the United Evangelical Lutheran Church of Germany and a board member of the Conference of Protestant Church Leaders of the GDR.

== Early life and education ==
Christina Fiedler was born in Chemnitz on 27 June 1918 to Luise and Karl Fiedler. Her father was an entrepreneur, working in building construction, civil engineering and concrete road construction. Her parents were members of Dietrich Bonhoeffer's Confessing Church and opponents of National Socialist ideology. She grew up in comfortable circumstances with two sisters.

Christina Fiedler attended primary and secondary school in Chemnitz from 1923 to 1932 and, at her mother's insistence, completed an apprenticeship as a dressmaker from 1932 to 1935 before studying fashion design for two semesters at the Europäischen Meisterakademie in Munich.

== Engineering ==
Fiedler then moved to her father's company and worked there as a technician until 1945. During this time she married and used the name Christina Schultheiß from then on. Karl Fiedler's company was partially destroyed by the SS Economic Administration Main Office in 1935 and parts of the family assets were confiscated when Karl Fiedler refused to employ Jewish forced labourers in his businesses. During the war against the Soviet Union, large parts of the company's industrial vehicle fleet were expropriated by the SS in 1941 and taken to Russia. Karl Fiedler then moved his business activities to Czechoslovakia, where he ran a quarry.

In 1952, Christina Schultheiß completed her studies as a construction technician and civil engineer and graduated as a master road builder in 1961. From 1952 to 1953, she managed the master road builder's office in Camburg in Thuringia and from 1953 to 1979 the master road builder's office in Stadtroda. Until 1984, she was a senior road foreman and branch manager of the district road directorate in Gera.

From 1965, she was actively involved in the Thuringian regional church. As President of the Thuringian Synod, she also worked in the areas of finance, forestry, agriculture and church building.

From 1991 she ran a road construction and civil engineering company, which she closed in 1998 to retire aged 80.

== Church and politics ==
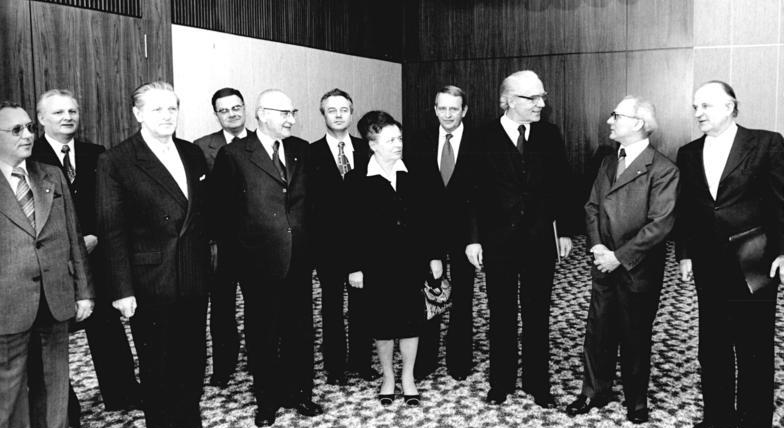
Erich Honecker (2nd from right), received the board of the Conference of Protestant Church Leaders in the GDR on 6 March 1978. From left to right: Rudi Bellmann, Hermann Kalb, Siegfried Wahrmann, Heinz Eichler, Paul Verner, Manfred Stolpe, Christina Schultheiß, Kurt Domsch, Albrecht Schönherr and Werner Krusche

Christina Schultheiß was a member of the church parliament of the Evangelical Lutheran Church in Thuringia from 1965 and was elected president of the state synod in 1978. She was also a member of the synods of the Federation of Protestant Churches in the GDR and the United Evangelical Lutheran Church of Germany from 1969 and a board member of the Conference of Protestant Church Leaders in the GDR from 1972. Schultheiß was described as the "Mutter Courage von Thüringen" (Mother Courage of Thuringia) and as a woman ‘who never minces her words’. In her church roles, she stood up to men and considered it appropriate to contradict a bishop and high-ranking officials. Former bishop Werner Leichconsidered that her practical mind and sense of reality "often brought us pastors back down to earth" and that "she was a gift for our church". Her personal cause was the fight for the ordination of female theologians, and she demanded "More self-confidence please!" from women.

Schultheiß fought to defend the independence of the church against the German Democratic Republic state. She attracted national attention when she pointed out the many injustices against church members at the first top-level meeting between the state and the church on 6 March 1978 chaired by GDR leader Erich Honecker. The meeting is regarded as one of the foundation of the increasing self-confidence of East German Christians, which was later one of the decisive factors for the peaceful reunification of Germany between 1989 and 1991.

== Personal life ==
In 1939, Fiedler married policeman and Wehrmacht officer Erhardt Schultheiß (d. 1953) and took his surname. The couple had two children, Elke and Lutz, who she raised alone after being widowed in 1953. Her husband had returned from the war paralyzed and died after seven years of serious illness. She was known for her mobility and autonomy well into old age, driving regularly until her 95th birthday and doing the housework and gardening herself until her death.

Christina Schultheiß died on 26 March 2016 in Triptis-Pillingsdorf.

== Awards and commemoration ==
Christina Schultheiß was honoured with the Order of Merit of the Federal Republic of Germany 1st Class in 1992.

A service of remembrance was held on her hundredth birthday in Pillingsdorf.
