= Christian Danz =

Christian Danz (born 1962 in Pößneck) is a German-Austrian Protestant theologian. Danz studied Protestant theology at the University of Jena from 1985 to 1990. He then worked as a vicar at the Evangelical Lutheran Church in Thuringia. In 1994, Danz received his doctorate in theology. In 1999 he habilitated in systematic theology at the University of Jena. Since the summer semester of 2002, Danz has been teaching as Professor of Systematic Theology at the Faculty of Protestant Theology at the University of Vienna.

Danz's research focuses on the following areas: fundamental theology, dogmatics, Reformation theology, history of theology of the 19th and 20th centuries, ethics (human rights), theology of religions and philosophy of religion. Danz understands religion as "an execution-bound, situational interpretation of reality".

== Selected works ==
- Religion als Freiheitsbewußtsein. Eine Studie zur Theologie als Theorie der Konstitutionsbedingungen individueller Subjektivität bei Paul Tillich, Berlin/New York 2000.
- Einführung in die Theologie der Religionen. Wien 2005.
- Einführung in die evangelische Dogmatik. Darmstadt 2010.
- Grundprobleme der Christologie. Tübingen 2013.
- Einführung in die Theologie Martin Luthers. Darmstadt 2013.
- Gottes Geist. Eine Pneumatologie. Tübingen 2019.
