= Old Mint, Stolberg =

Coordinates: 51°34′20″N 10°57′22″E

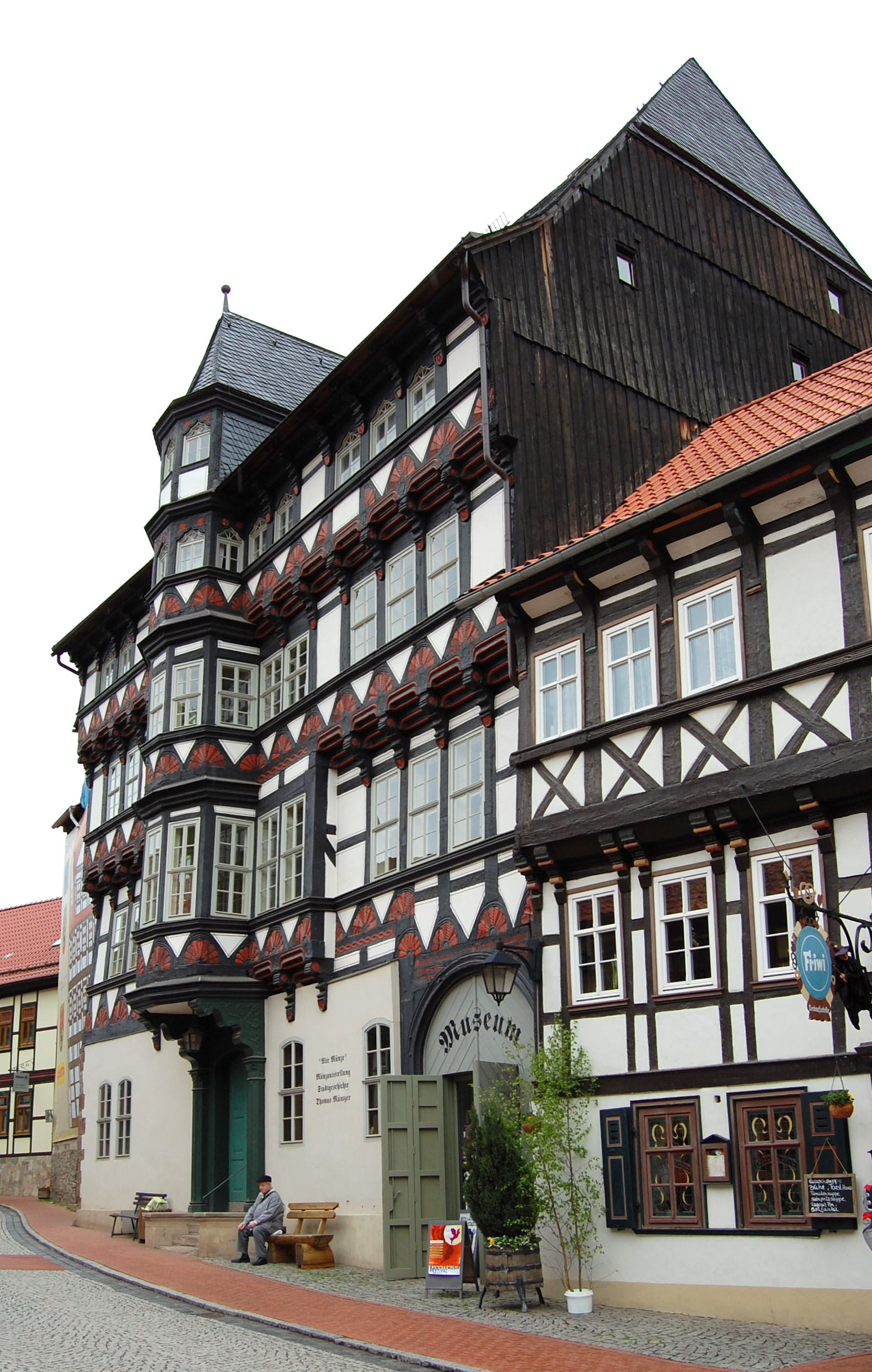
The Old Mint

The Old Mint (German: Alte Münze) is a protected timber-framed house in the town of Stolberg in the German state of Saxony-Anhalt. The building houses the Old Mint Museum (Museum Alte Münze). It is located at No. 19, Niedergasse.

== History and architecture ==
The impressively designed timber-framed building was built in 1534 or 1535 by Stolberg citizen and master minter (Münzmeister), Kilian Keßler. Over the years it has acted as a mint, mining fee office (Berglehnsamt), district court (Amtsgericht), Princely Consistory of Stolberg-Stolberg and local history museum. Major restorations took place in 1843, 1990/91 and finally in 2004. Following the 2004 renovation work it was re-opened as the Old Mint Museum (Museum Alte Münze).

The building has a solidly built ground floor above which rise three timber-framed storeys whose facade is asymmetrically designed. The two uppermost storeys are jetties, i.e. storeys that project beyond the one below. The top storey has inflexed arches. One feature of the building are its polygonal oriel windows. These oriel windows, also built in a timber-framed style, are supported on decorated corbels and project out over the eaves of the house. The building is covered with a steeply pitched gable roof. The main entranceway is designed as a semi-circular arch and has Late Gothic mullions. The house measures 23.5 metres high, is 18 metres wide and 14 metres deep.

The jetty plates (Stockschwellen) are decorated with double "ship cornices" (Schiffskehlen). On the shoulders are fan rosettes (Fächerrosetten), the heads of the jetty beams have very elaborate profiles. On the building are the inscriptions Am tage kiliani mit gots hilfe gericht ("Built on St. Kilian's Day with God's help") and Laus Deo (Latin for "Praise the Lord"). On the facade is a braid, rare even in Stolberg, which was supposed to ward off evil. There are other very varied decorations, including a heart pierced by an arrow. The windows are eight-pane windows, typical of Stolberg.

== Literature ==
- Wolfgang Knape, Stolberg, Schmidt-Buch-Verlag, Wernigerode, 2007, ISBN 978-3-928977-34-0, page 46 ff.
- Dehio, Handbuch der Deutschen Kunstdenkmäler, Sachsen-Anhalt II, Regierungsbezirke Dessau und Halle, Deutscher Kunstverlag, Munich, Berlin, 1999, ISBN 3-422-03065-4, page 806
