= Stolberg (Harz) =

Town in Saxony-Anhalt, Germany

- Ortsteil of Südharz
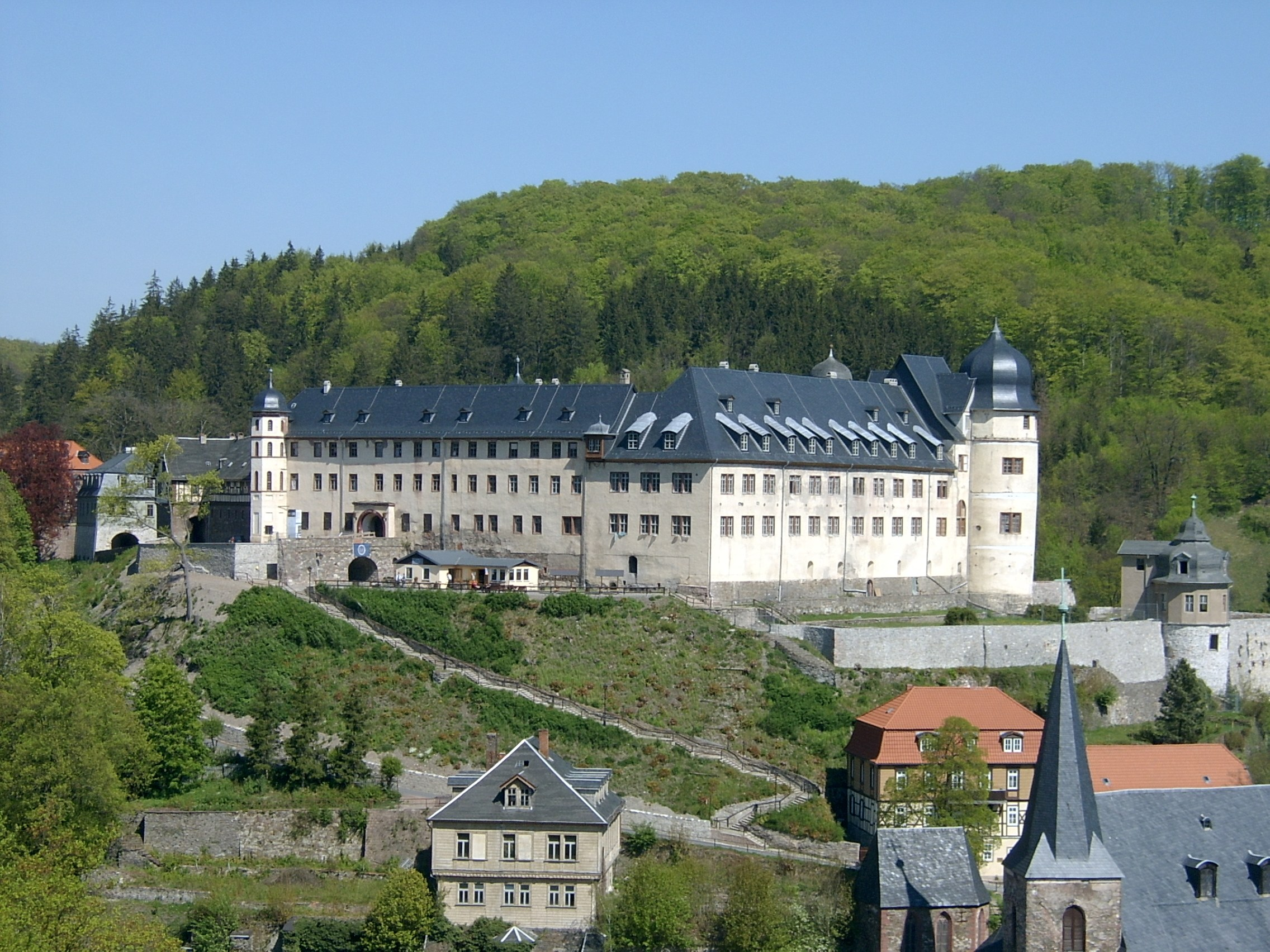

- Coat of arms
- Interactive map of Stolberg
- Location within Germany Location within Saxony-Anhalt
- Coordinates: 51°34′N 10°57′E
- Country: Germany
- State: Saxony-Anhalt
- District: Mansfeld-Südharz
- Municipality: Südharz

Area
  - Total: 67.52 km^{2} (26.07 sq mi)
- Elevation: 340 m (1,120 ft)

Population (2009-12-31)
  - Total: 1,286
  - Density: 19.05/km^{2} (49.33/sq mi)
- Time zone: UTC+01:00 (CET)
  - Summer (DST): UTC+02:00 (CEST)
- Postal codes: 06547
- Dialling codes: 034654
- Vehicle registration: SGH
- Website: www.stadt-stolberg.de

Stolberg (German pronunciation: [ˈʃtɔlbɛʁk]) is a town (sometimes itself called 'Harz' in historical references) and a former municipality in the district of Mansfeld-Südharz, in the German State of Saxony-Anhalt, Germany. It is situated in the southern part of the Harz mountains, about 27 kilometres (17 mi) west of Sangerhausen, and 13 km (8.1 mi) northeast of Nordhausen. Since 1 September 2010, it has been part of the municipality of Südharz.

== History ==
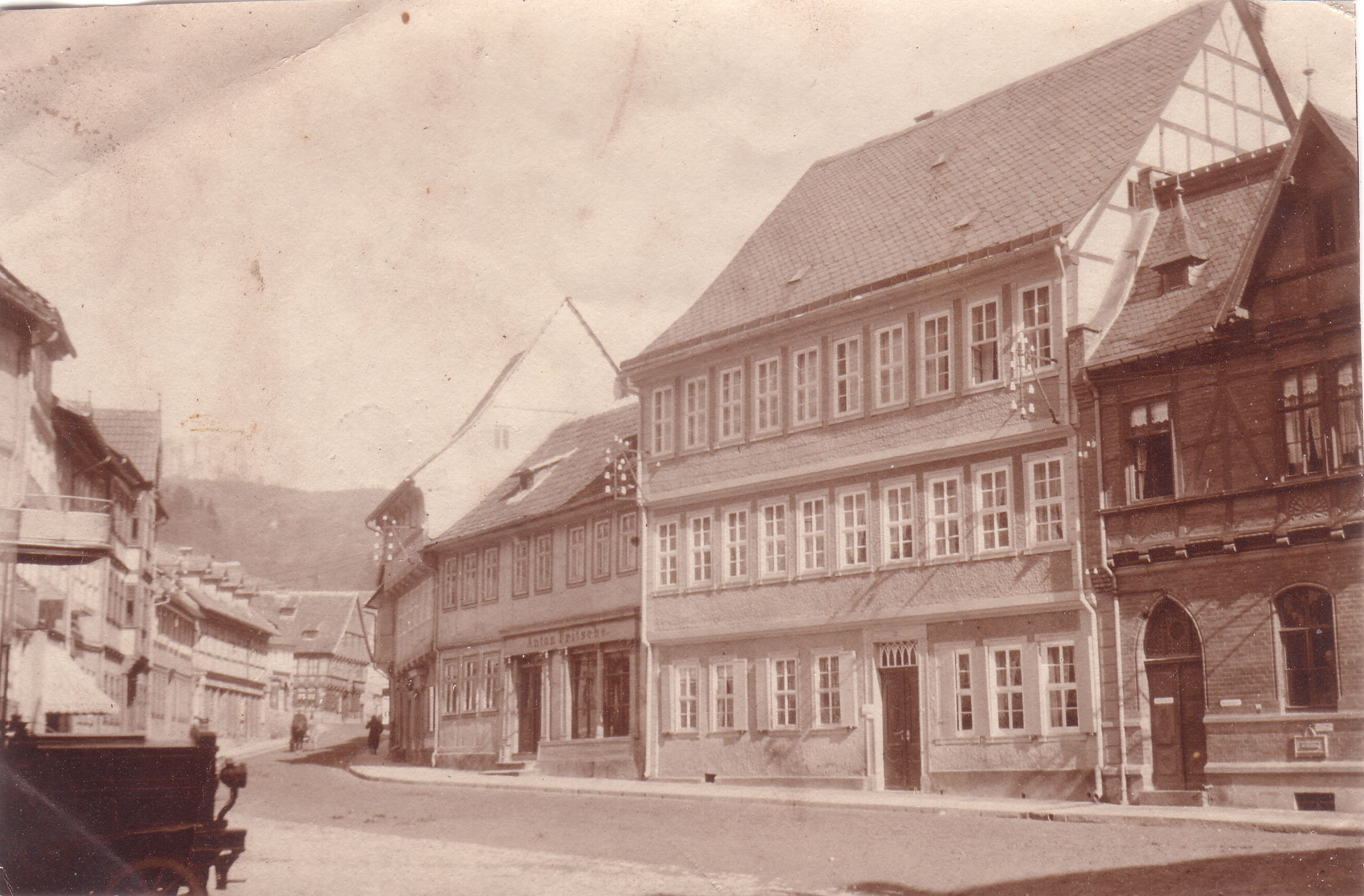
The market in Stolberg around 1905

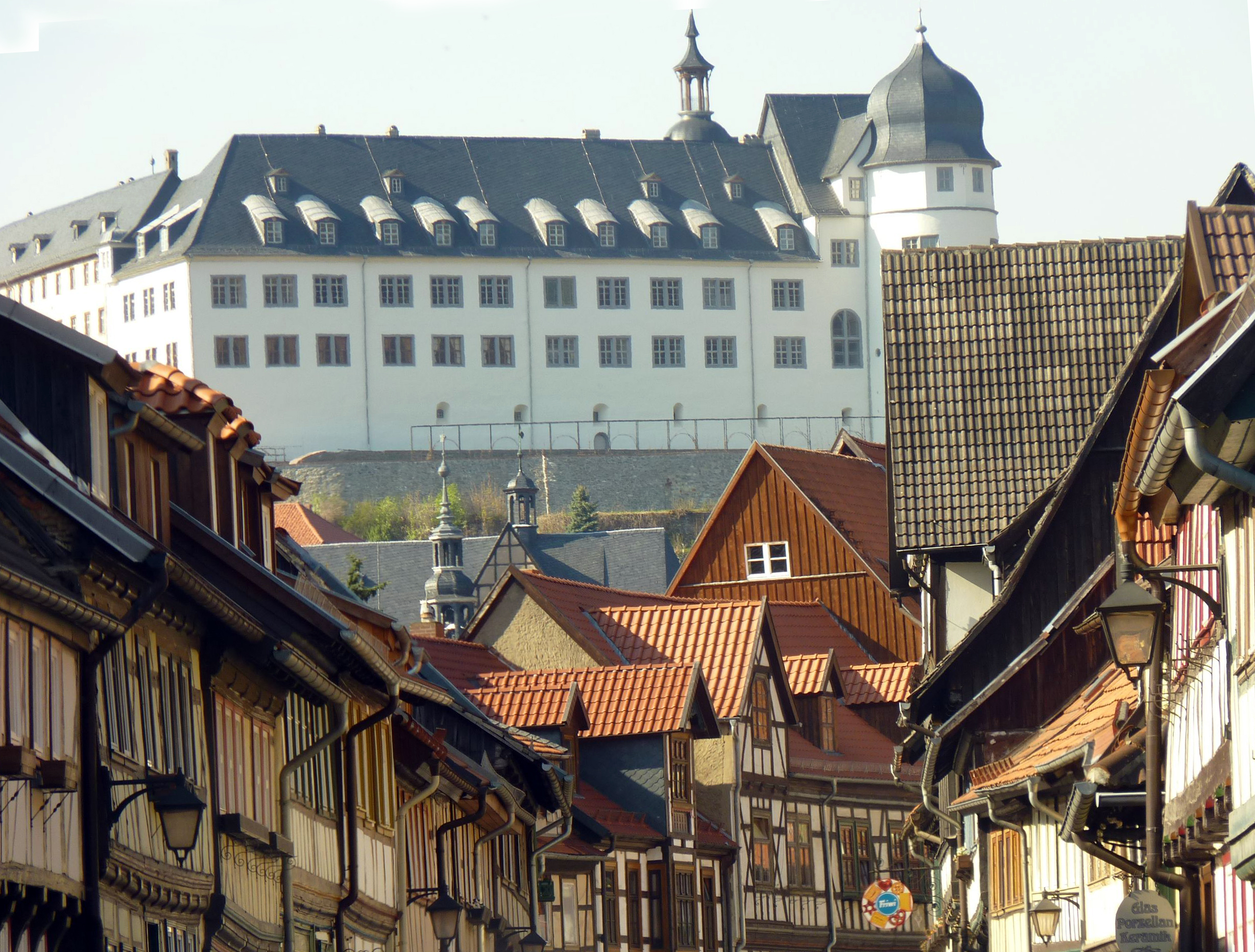
Stolberg's timber-framed houses and castle

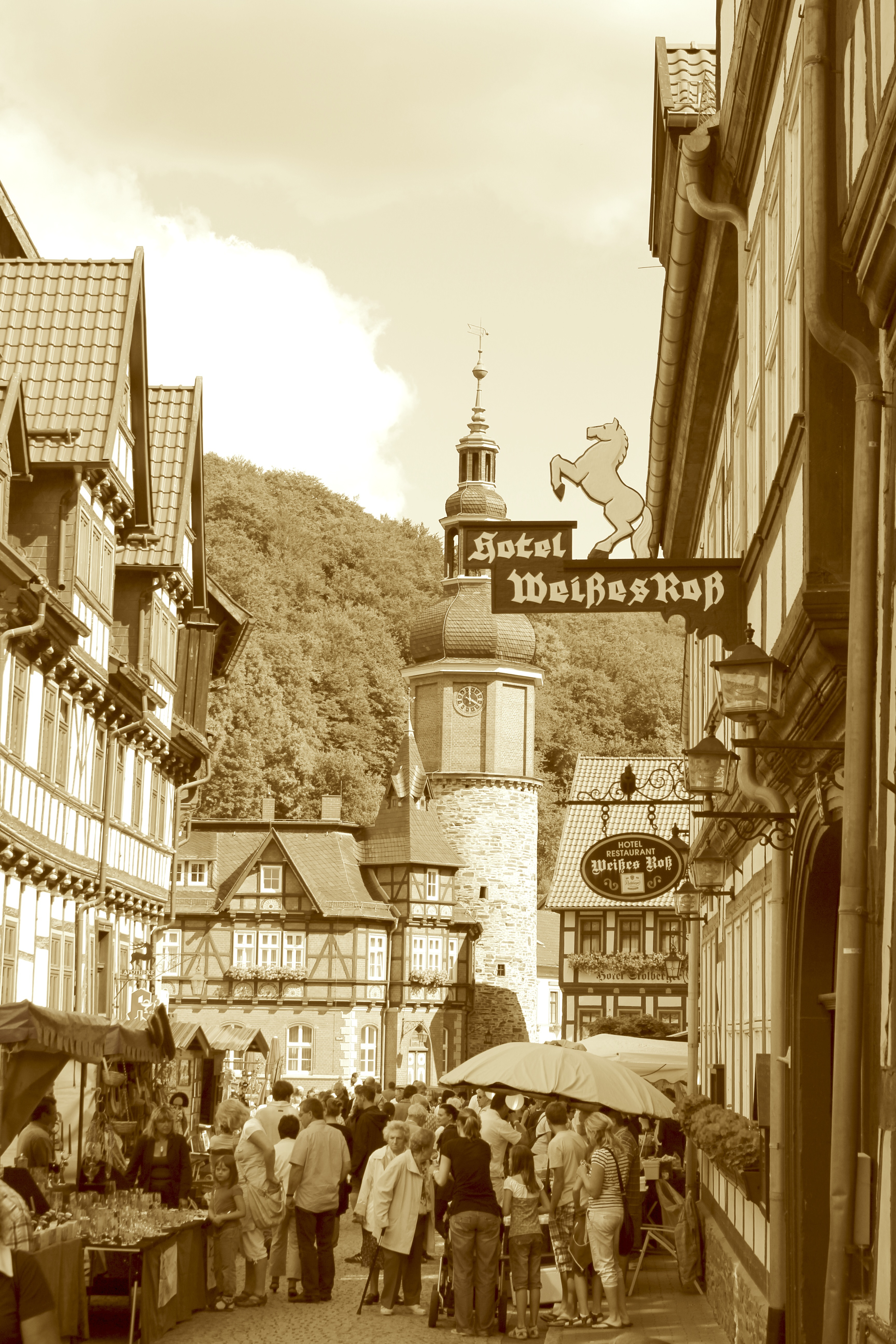
The market in Stolberg

Stolberg was established as a settlement for miners in around AD 1000, although there is evidence of mining in the area as far back as 794. The name is derived from the German words Stollen = "[mining] gallery" and Berg = "hill". Iron, copper, silver, tin and gold were extracted there. Town status was awarded to Stolberg (Harz) before 1300.

During the German Peasants' War, Stolberg was the site of several battles, the peasants being led by Thomas Müntzer who was born in the town. On 2 May 1525, rebellious peasants invaded the town and forced the ruling Count Botho of Stolberg to accept their demands, the 24 Stolberg Articles. These were quickly revoked, however, following the defeat of the peasants.

Coins were minted in Stolberg as early as the High Middle Ages, the industry reaching its heyday during the 16th century. By contrast, mining ceased in the 17th century.

From its earliest days, Stolberg had been the residence and family seat of the counts of Stolberg. In 1548 it became the seat of Stolberg-Stolberg. In 1738 the counts of Stolberg were forced to recognize the suzerainty of the Electorate of Saxony. The town was awarded to the Kingdom of Prussia in the 1815 Congress of Vienna and Stolberg was subsequently administered by the Prussian Province of Saxony.

The counts of Stolberg-Stolberg established a consistory in the mid-16th century to head the Lutheran Church in the county. In 1645 the County of Stolberg split into 2 new counties – called Stolberg-Stolberg and Stolberg-Wernigerode. When the latter established its own church seat in 1658, the one in Stolberg became known as the Comital Consistory of Stolberg-Stolberg. In 1893 it was further renamed into the Princely Consistory of Stolberg-Stolberg. Since 1821 the Lutheran parishes on the territory of the former county have been part of the Church Province of Saxony, itself part of the administratively united Evangelical State Church of Prussia. Today they belong to the Evangelical Church in Central Germany, founded in 2009.

Nevertheless, the consistory continued to have regional responsibility for the Lutheran church parishes in the former county. Until the separation of church and state in 1919 it was directly subordinate to the imperial lord (Standesherr), the Count or Prince of Stolberg-Stolberg and indirectly to the governor (Oberpräsident) of the Province of Saxony. At the end of 1944 the Evangelical High Consistory (Evangelischer Oberkirchenrat) (the headquarters of the state church) moved its seat from the endangered city of Berlin to the consistorial building at Stolberg.

On 5 November 1947 the Consistory of Stolberg-Stolberg was merged with the "old" Princely Consistory of Stolberg-Roßla, whose seat was in Roßla, to form a consistorial district, whereby the "new" Evangelical-Lutheran Consistory of Stolberg-Roßla had its seat in Stolberg. "The governing body of the Evangelical Church of the Church Province of Saxony has [...] on 28 October 2005 decided consultation with the district synod of the church parish of Eisleben to disband the Evangelical-Lutheran Consistory of Stolberg-Roßla."

In 1833, Stolberg had 2,392 inhabitants. At the beginning of the 20th century, Stolberg became a tourist town. In 1923, a railway to Berga–Kelbra was opened. The town has been a health resort since 1946.

In early 1946, "14 youths aged from 15 to 18" (two were 19 and 20 years old) were arrested by an operational group of the Soviet Security Service, the NKVD, on allegations of being involved in Werwolf, the Nazi plan to form a commando force. They were sentenced by a military tribunal to death (3 youths, carried out in two cases) or to lengthy terms in prison of up to 25 years. The majority of the youths did not survive captivity in the Soviet special camps. In 1995 the group was cleared by the Attorney General of the Russian Federation.

On 1 September 2010, Stolberg was incorporated into the municipality of Südharz ("South Harz").

== Politics ==
=== Mayor ===
The major (Ortsbürgermeister) of Stolberg is Ulrich Franke, elected on 28 May 2000.

=== Coat of arms ===
The town coat of arms has been re-designed by the herald, utz Döring.

=== Twinning ===
Stolberg, Saxony-Anhalt is twinned with:

- Stolberg, North Rhine-Westphalia, Germany
- Hardegsen, Lower Saxony, Germany
- Hodonín, South Moravia, Czech Republic

== Culture and sights ==
=== Structures ===
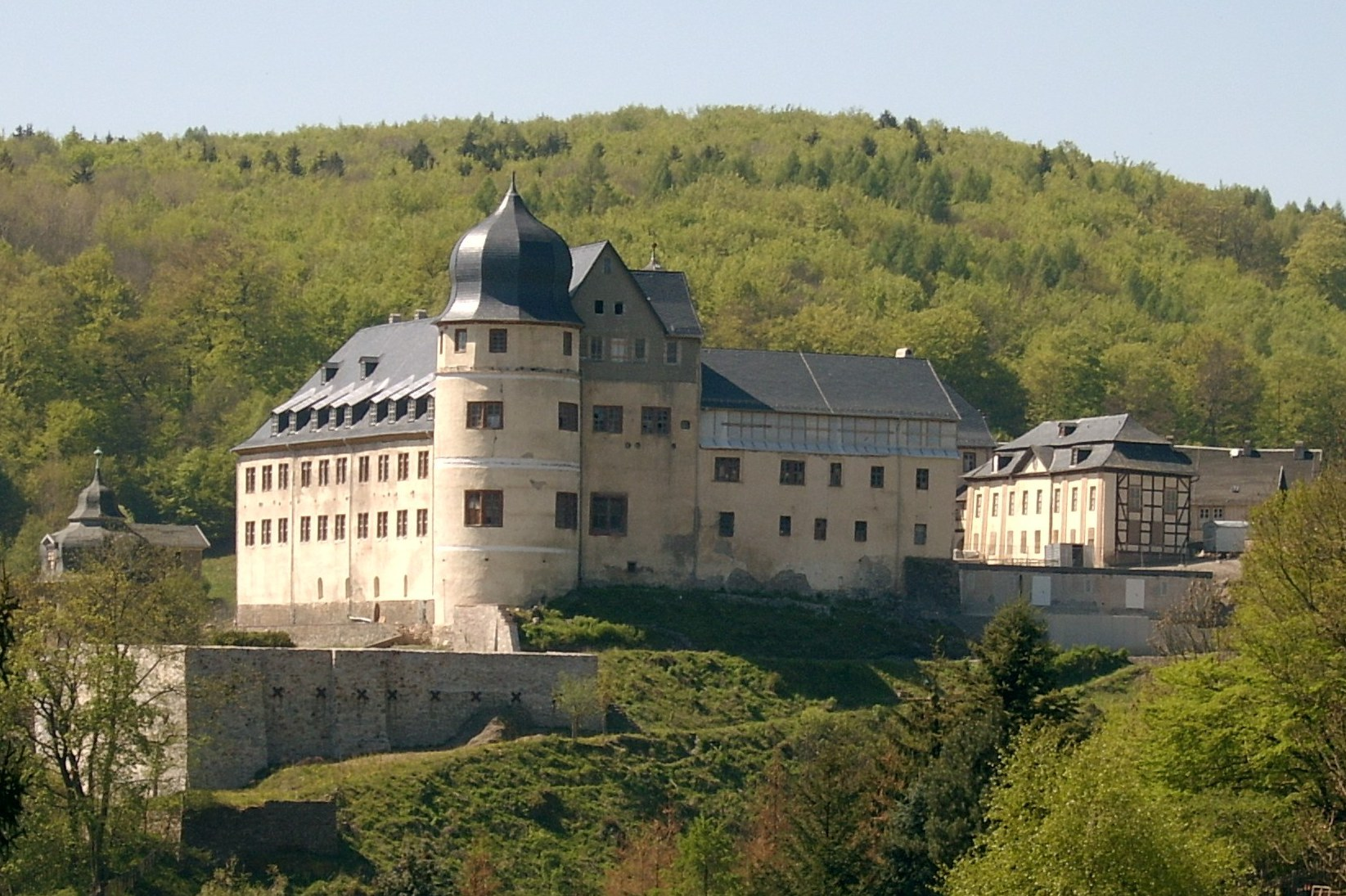
The castle

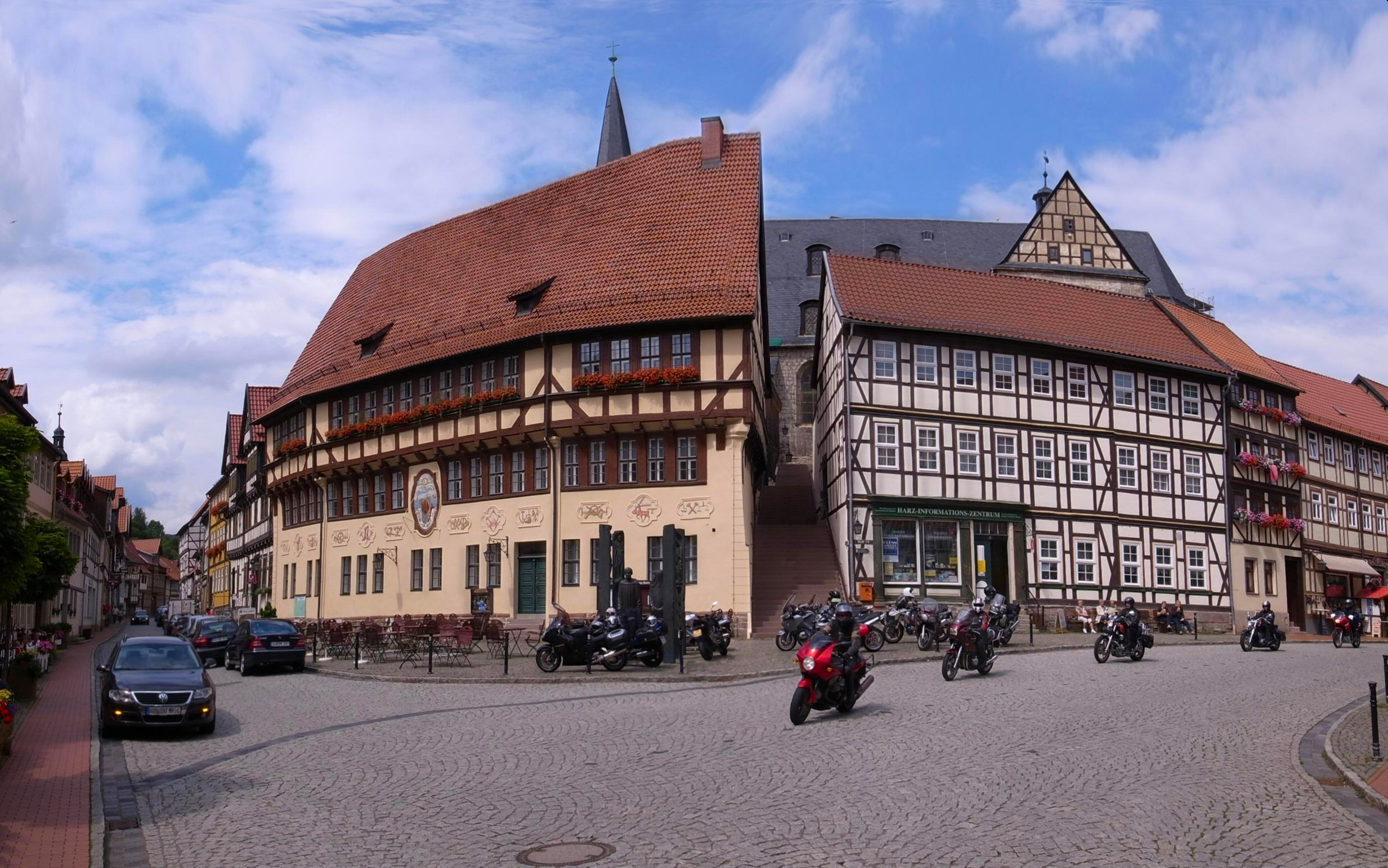
The town hall on the market square (left)

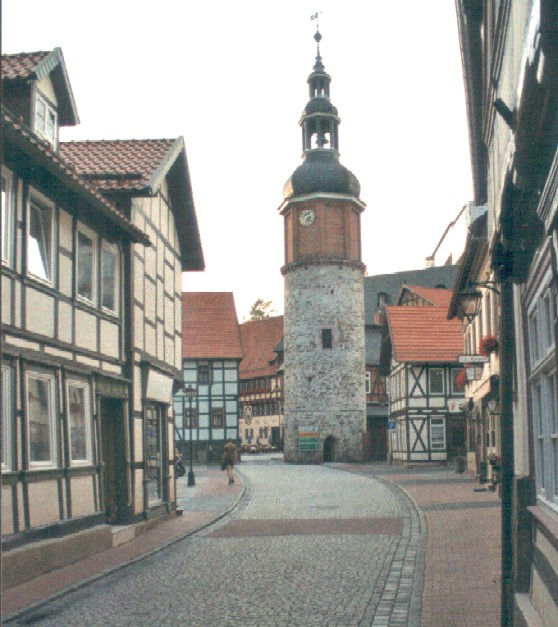
The Saiger Tower

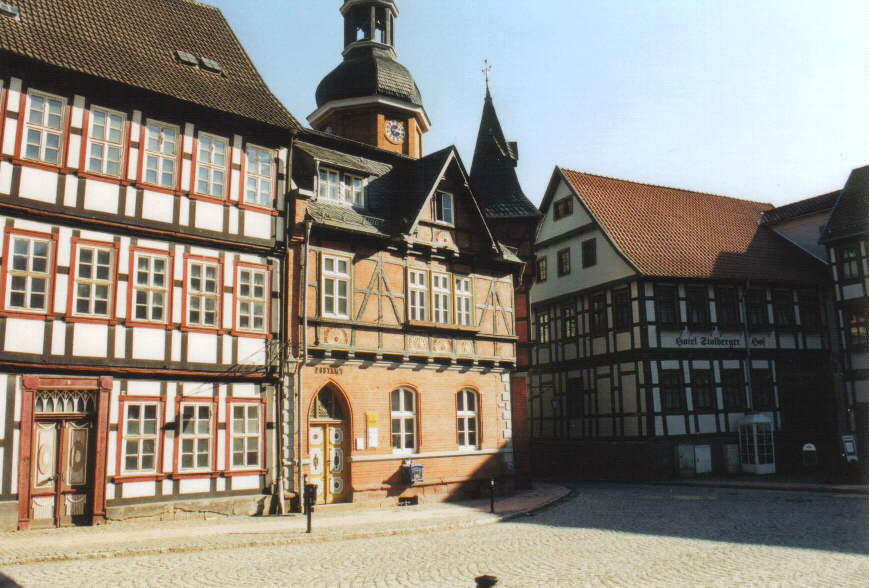
Post office with Saiger Tower behind

- Stolberg Castle (Schloss Stolberg). The castle stands on a hill that drops steeply on 3 sides. The oldest part of the castle, its round tower, dates to around 1200, although its most recent elements were built in the Renaissance style between 1539 and 1547. In the southeast wing is the Classicist Great Reception Room (Große Empfangszimmer), the Red Hall (Roter Saal), designed by Karl Friedrich Schinkel. The castle owes its present appearance to remodelling work carried out between 1690 and 1700. Until they were dispossessed in 1945 the castle was owned by the family of the Prince of Stolberg-Stolberg. At present it is being comprehensively restored and renovated by the German Foundation for Monument Conservation.
- Town Hall (Rathaus). The town hall from 1454 is an architectural curiosity because it has no internal stairs. The only access to the upper storeys is by an external flight of steps that also leads up to St. Martin's Church.
- St. Martin's Church. A Late Gothic church where Martin Luther preached on 21 April 1525 against the Peasants' Revolt. The restoration of the three-aisled basilica from the 13th century is very expensive, thanks to its hillside location. Here, too, the German Foundation for Monument Conservation is involved, alongside other donors. Northwest of the church is St. Mary's Chapel. The Müntzer Monument, made by the sculptor, Messerschmidt, was erected just in front of the town hall on the birthday of Thomas Müntzer in 1989.
- Saiger Tower. Opposite the town hall is the Saiger Tower. It dates from the 13th century, but the upper part was replaced in the early 19th century. It takes its name from the Saiger Smelting Works (Saigerschmelzhütte) that stood next to the tower in the Middle Ages.
- Niedergasse. The street known as Niedergasse is home to several historic buildings. The Thomas Müntzer House (Thomas-Müntzer-Haus) is the birthplace of Thomas Müntzer and dates to 1851, but was partly burnt down. Also on the street are St George's Chapel and the Old Mint (Alte Münze) which houses the local history museum.
- Rittertor. At the western end of Rittergasse is the Rittertor or Knight's Gate, the only surviving medieval town gate in Stolberg. West of the gate is the Chalet Waldfrieden, built in 1810 by Karl Friedrich Schinkel and, nearby, is the spot where the Chapel of the Holy Cross stood until 1818.
- Luther Beech. On a hillside overlooking the town to the southwest is the Luther Beech (Lutherbuche) that commemorates Martin Luther.
- Stag Monument. The Stag Monument (Hirschdenkmal) is located in a wood northwest of the town.
- Großer Auerberg (579 m). The hill known as the Großer Auerberg rises not far from Stolberg. At its summit is the 38-metre-high observation tower known as Joseph's Cross. It is the largest iron double cross in the world.

=== Natural monuments ===
- Hunrodeiche, a 1,000-year-old oak tree.

=== Road signs ===
The appearance of the roads in Stolberg is unique for Germany. At the entrances to the town there are signs indicating a speed limit of 30 km/h and no parking zones (cars may park in designated areas for one hour with the use of parking discs). Otherwise there are no road signs in the town. Although there is a clear separation between pavement and road, this may be seen as an early form of the shared space concept.

=== Regular events ===
- On 1 January the annual medal (Jahresmedaille) is minted in the Old Mint Museum (ALTE MÜNZE) - the only fully preserved 18th-century minting works in Europe.
- In early February, usually on the second Sunday of the month, the Winter Festival (Winterfest) takes place by Joseph's Cross, the largest iron double cross in the world. The festival offers games and fun in the snow for all the family.
- On Easter Saturday evening a traditional Osterfeuer bonfire is lit on the Festival Square (Festplatz) by the Rittertor.
- The Great Walpurgis Festival at the Joseph's Cross on the Großer Auerberg takes place on 30 April with stage plays, musicians, herb women, broom makers, witches and devils as well as a great firework display at the end. Concerts at the Joseph's Cross also take place on Ascension and Pentecost Sunday.
- On the weekend after Ascension, the Stolberg Shooting Guild, which was founded in 1421, holds its Schützenfest with competitions for the king (Königsschießen) and people's king (Volkskönigschießen) and a parade in traditional costume early on Sunday morning.
- The Museum Festival (Museumsfest) takes place on a weekend in mid-June in the Old Mint.
- The Stolberg Archery Competition (Stolberger Bogenschützen) takes places on the last weekend in June on the Festplatz by the Rittertor, with shooting with historic crossbows and Flatterschießen for children.
- On the penultimate Sunday in July a traditional Forest Festival (Waldfest) is held at the Joseph's Cross with Harz customs and folklore, specialities, music and traders.
- On the second weekend in August the Stolberg Larch Festival (Stolberger Lerchenfest) takes place, a historic town festival with traders, craftsmen, jugglers and musicians.
- The European Town Festival (Europastadtfest) is celebrated on the second weekend in September. Each year a different European town is invited with which Stolberg has friendly relations. The theme of the festival is based on the culture and cuisine of the town and its home country. Tourist information and special souvenirs from the guest town and country are also available.
- On 3 October, a festive event to celebrate the Day of German Unity is held with its twin towns of Stolberg (Rhineland) and Hardegsen (Solling).
- In early November the Johann Gottfried Schnabel Society holds its annual general meeting. This literary, scholarly club researches the life and works of the well-known 18th century author, Johann Gottfried Schnabel.
- On the 1st Advent Sunday there is an Advent concert in St. Martin's Church and a fairy tale Advent event in the alleys of the town.
- On the 2nd or 3rd Advent Sunday the Stolberg Christmas market opens in the historic hunting lodge (Jägerhof).

== Memorials ==
- 1969 memorial in the Tyrahöhe cultural park to 11 concentration camp prisoners, who were murdered by SS men during a death march in the spring of 1945.

== Transport links ==
=== Road ===
Motorists can approach the town from the Harz Mountains to the north and the Kyffhäuser Hills to the south, leaving the A 38 motorway at the Berga junction.

=== Rail ===
Until December 2011, Stolberg was linked via the Berga-Kelbra-Stolberg line to the main line from Halle to Kassel, where good connexions were possible at Berga-Kelbra station. On weekdays there were bus services from the station and, at weekends, the Burgenlandbahn ran local rail services. In addition, in the summer there were through trains from Leipzig and Magdeburg via Sangerhausen directly to Stolberg. These excursion services ran on weekends, once in the morning to Stolberg and once in the afternoon back towards Leipzig and Magdeburg. Scheduled train services to Stolberg were cancelled, however, in December 2011, by the public transport company of Saxony-Anhalt (NASA), due to low utilization of the trains.

== Notable people ==
- Georg Aemilius (1517–1569), theologian and botanist
- Johann Gottfried Schnabel (pseudonym: Gisander; 1692–1751/8), German author
- Johann Arnold Zeitfuchs (1671–1742), chronicler, theologian and Christian author

=== Sons and daughters of the town ===
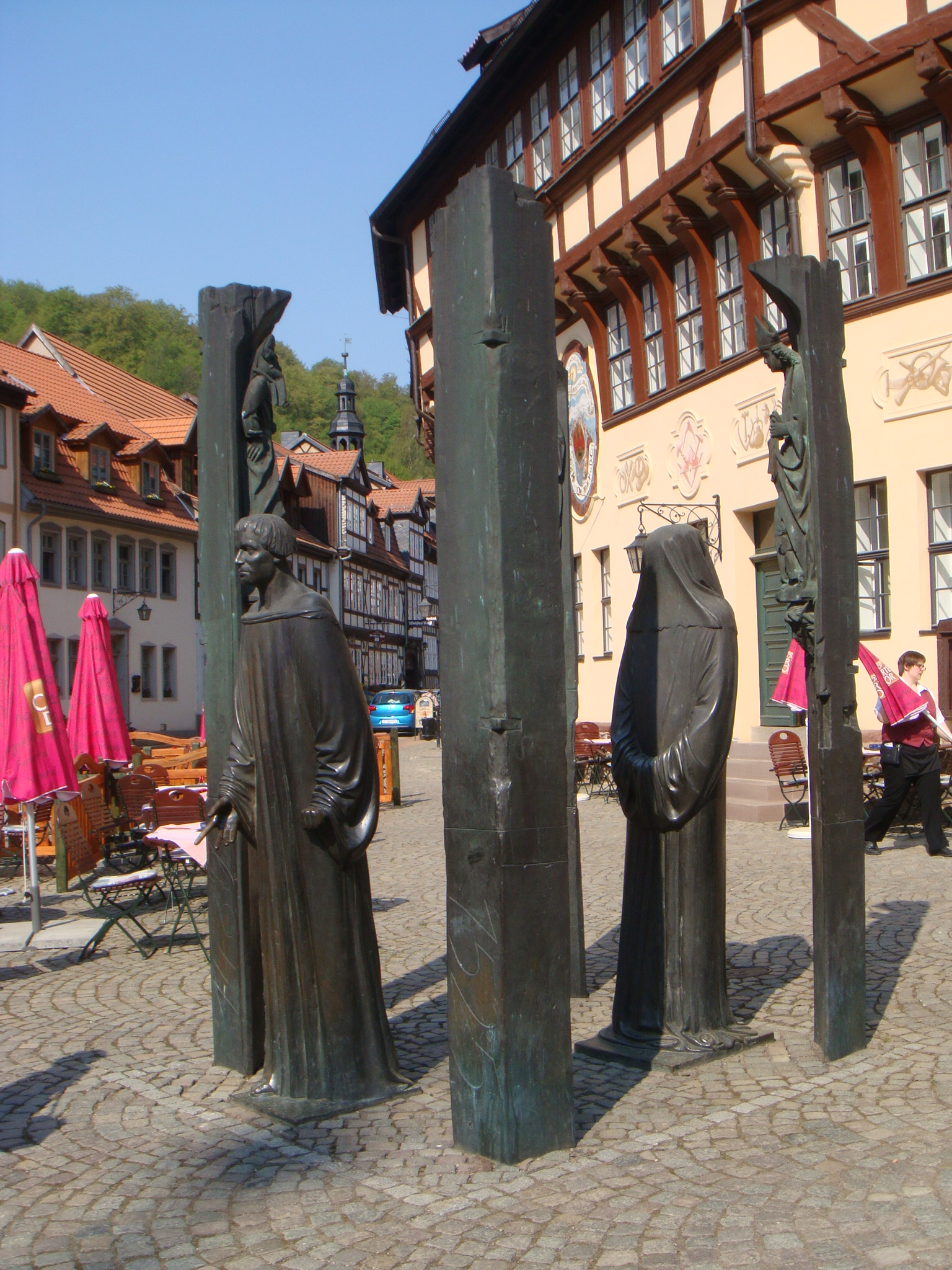
The Thomas Müntzer Monument by K.F.Messerschmidt, 1989

- Hans von Werthern (1443–1533), knight, privy councillor of the reigning dukes of Saxony, Amtmann and owner of the Barony of Brücken
- Thomas Müntzer (1489–1525), revolutionary theologian and peasants' leader.
- Tilemann Plathner (1490–1551), superintendent and first Evangelical minister in Stolberg
- Countess Anna of Stolberg (1504–1574), 28th abbess of the imperial abbey at Quedlinburg
- Countess Juliana of Stolberg (1506–1580), mother of William of Orange
- Count Henry of Stolberg (1509–1572), reigning count over Stolberg and Wernigerode
- Johann Schneidewein (1519–1568), lawyer
- Paulus von Stolzmann (1863–1930), General of Infantry in the Reichswehr
- Karl Aderhold (1884–1921), Reichstag MP of the independent Social Democrat Party of Germany
- Gustav Leidenroth (born 1885), NSDAP Reichstag MP
- Gottfried Gruner (1923-2011), sculptor
- Wolfgang Knape (born 1947), author
- Jens Lehmann (b 1967), cyclist
- Matthias Höhn (b 1975), state chairman of the Die Linke party and MP in the Saxony-Anhalt parliament (Landtag)
- Daniel Seibert (born 1980), bearer of the Bundeswehr Cross of Honour for Valour.

== See also ==
- House of Stolberg
