= Rolf-Dieter Arens =

German University professor and pianist

Rolf-Dieter Arens (born 16 February 1945) is a German University professor and pianist. From 2001 to 2010 he was Rector of the Hochschule für Musik Franz Liszt, Weimar.

== Life ==
Arens was born in Zinnwald-Georgenfeld. He received his first piano lessons at the age of five and completed his studies at the University of Music and Theatre Leipzig from 1963 to 1968 with H. Volger (piano) and L. Schuster (chamber music). From 1970 to 1986 he taught piano in Leipzig and Weimar, from 1986 until his retirement in 2011 he was full professor for piano at the Hochschule für Musik Franz Liszt in Weimar. In 1987 he served on the jury of the Paloma O'Shea Santander International Piano Competition. From 1986 to 1991 he was a soloist with the Berlin Symphony Orchestra. In 1995 he founded the Kammermusikvereinigung Weimarer Solisten.

Arens has been President of the Kulturstiftung Leipzig since 2011.

== Awards ==
- 1982: Art Prize of the German Democratic Republic
- 2014: Order of Merit of the Free State of Thuringia
