= Hunrodeiche =

Oak tree in Saxony-Anhalt, Germany

Coordinates: 51°34′18.9″N 10°56′12.5″E

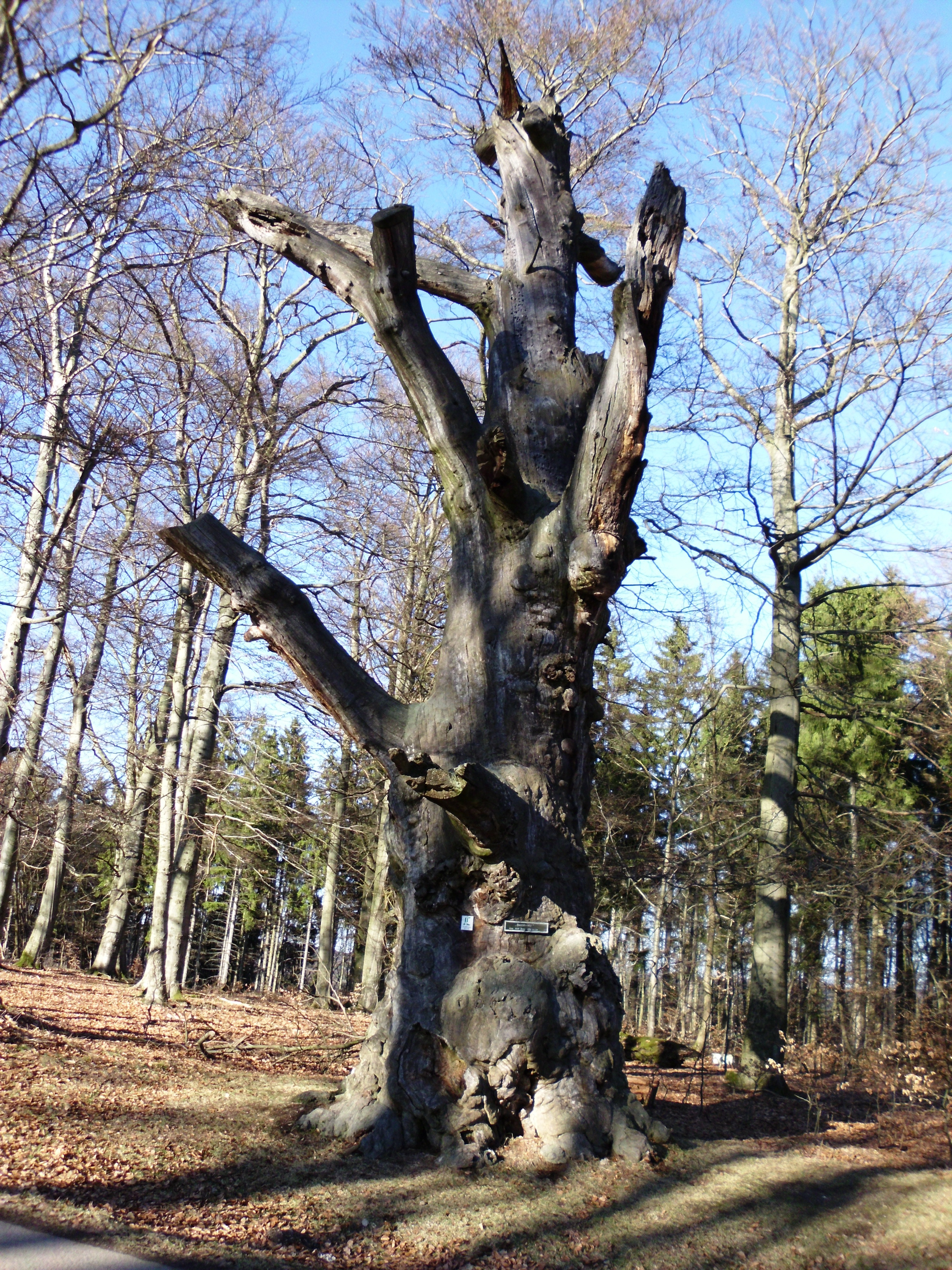
The Hunrodeiche

The Hunrodeiche or, more rarely, the Hunrodseiche, in the Harz Mountains of central Germany is an oak tree over 1,000 years old near Hainfeld in the county of Mansfeld-Südharz in the state of Saxony-Anhalt.

== Location ==
The Hunrodeiche is located in the Lower Harz in the Harz/Saxony-Anhalt Nature Park and within the South Harz Karst Landscape Biosphere Reserve. It is due east of Hainfeld, a village in the municipality of Stolberg, on the wooded edge of the Hainfeld plateau at a height of about 461 m above sea level (NN) on the Silberbachstraße (from Hainfeld to Stolberg). The stream of the same name, a tributary of the Thyra, rises a few hundred metres southeast of the oak.

== Description ==
The Hunrodeiche has been declared a natural monument. It takes about six people to reach around its gnarled trunk. Until about 2000 the tree still had many green shoots; today only the trunk and several, in some cases, thick, but mostly cut branches indicate the long life of the oak with just the occasional leafy shoot.

== Hiking ==
The Hunrodeiche is no. 216 in the system of checkpoints of the Harzer Wandernadel hiking network. The checkpoint box, which used to be fixed to the tree, is now on a post next to it.
