= Helmut Fritsche =

German agronomist and politician

Friedrich Heinrich Helmut Fritsche
- Born: 2 January 1932; Weißensee, Thuringia
- Died: 2008; Weißensee, Thuringia
- Occupations: agronomist and politician
- Political party: Christian Democratic Union
- Spouse: Ursula Fritsche née Rothe
- Father: Friedrich Fritsche
- Awards: Order of Merit of the Free State of Thuringia; Golden Badge of Honour on Ribbon

Friedrich Heinrich Helmut Fritsche (January 2, 1932 - 2008) was a German agronomist and politician.

== Life ==
He was born in 1932 as the first son of the farmer Friedrich Fritz Fritsche and his wife Marta Fritsche née Möser. He studied and made a diploma as agricultural engineer. He spend much time of his life being an environmentalist. From 1990 to 1999 he was the municipal fire chief and from 1990 unto his death city councillor.

For his merits he awarded the Order of Merit of the Free State of Thuringia by Minister-President Dieter Althaus in 2004.
