= Demandware =

American web technology company, 2004–2016

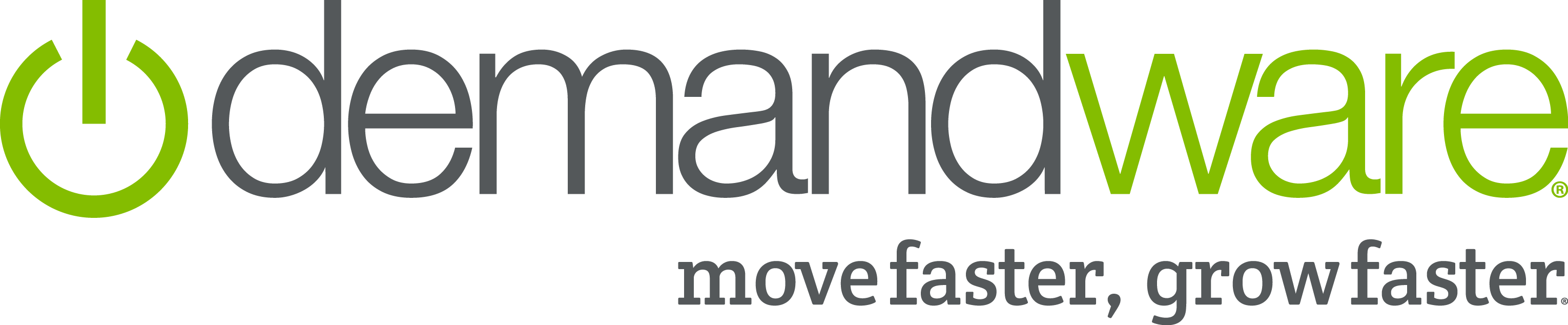
- Founded: 2004; 22 years ago
- Founder: Stephan Schambach; Wayne Whitcomb
- Defunct: July 11, 2016
- Fate: Acquired
- Headquarters: United States
- Services: e-commerce, mobile commerce, software, SaaS, cloud computing
- Parent: Salesforce
- Website: Salesforce.com

Demandware was a cloud-based software technology company headquartered in Burlington, Massachusetts.

Founded in 2004, Demandware was acquired by Salesforce in 2016 for $2.8B, and was rebranded to Salesforce Commerce Cloud.

== History ==
Demandware was founded in February 2004 by Stephan Schambach to provide a hosted service to enable companies to develop and manage e-commerce websites. The service was launched in the first quarter of 2005. Schambach previously founded the early e-commerce company Intershop in 1992. Seed money for Demandware was provided by venture capital firms General Catalyst Partners and North Bridge Venture Partners.

=== 2012 IPO ===
On March 15, 2012, Demandware began trading on the New York Stock Exchange, raising $88 million in its initial public offering of $16 per share. Following its IPO, shares were up more than 50% from the IPO price by the next morning. In November 2013, Demandware announced an underwritten registered public offering.

=== Acquisition ===
On June 1, 2016, Salesforce signed a definitive agreement to acquire Demandware for $2.8 billion. The acquisition was completed on July 11th, 2016.
