= Order of Merit of the Free State of Thuringia =

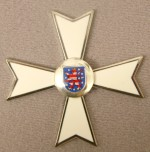
- Insignia of the Order of Merit of the Free State of Thuringia
- Type: Order of merit
- Country: Germany
- Presented by: the Free State of Thuringia
- Established: 19 September 2000
- First award: 22 November 2000
- Ribbon bar of the order

The Order of Merit of the Free State of Thuringia (German: Verdienstorden des Freistaats Thüringen) is the highest order which is bestowed by the Free State of Thuringia. The number of living holders of the order is limited to 300 persons.

== Notable recipients ==
- Iris von Arnim
- Rolf-Dieter Arens
- Alan Bern
- Andreas Birkmann
- Yehoshua Büchler
- Tankred Dorst
- Josef Duchac
- Helmut Fritsche
- Stéphane Hessel
- Ivan Ivanji
- Sarah Kirsch
- Hans-Reinhard Koch
- Hilmar Kopper
- Reiner Kunze
- Werner Leich
- Peter Maser
- Gunda Niemann-Stirnemann
- Peter Röhlinger
- Stephan Schambach
- Lothar Späth
- Bernhard Vogel
- Nike Wagner
- Günter Weiler
