= Intershop Communications AG =

German e-commerce software provider

- Type: Public
- ISIN: DE000A254211
- Industry: E-Commerce, Enterprise Software
- Founded: 1992 (as "NetConsult")
- Founder: Stephan Schambach, Karsten Schneider, Wilfried Beeck
- Headquarters: Jena, Germany
- Number of locations: 10 (Germany: Jena, Ilmenau, Stuttgart, Frankfurt am Main, USA: Chicago, San Francisco, Australia: Melbourne, Bulgaria: Sofia, France: Paris, Sweden: Stockholm)
- Area served: Worldwide
- Key people: Board of Management: Markus Dränert (CEO), Petra Stappenbeck (CFO), Supervisory Board: Frank Fischer (Chairman of the Supervisory Board), Günter Hagspiel (Vice Chairman of the Supervisory Board), Hans-Jürgen Rieder (Member of the Supervisory Board), Matthias Breuckmann (Member of the Supervisory Board).
- Services: Implementation and integration, cloud operations/hosting, managed services, consulting and professional services, training and enablement, technical support and maintenance
- Website: https://www.intershop.com/en/

Intershop Communications AG is a public e-commerce company headquartered in Jena, Thuringia, Germany. Intershop operates in Europe, the United States of America, and the Asia-Pacific region.

== Company history ==
Intershop was founded in 1992 as NetConsult by Stephan Schambach, Karsten Schneider, and Wilfried Beeck. In 1995, the company created the first German online store. That same year, they created "The first standard software for e-commerce applications." marketed in the U.S. one year later (see also Online shopping) and became one of the leading software developers for this early market.

Intershop is one of the best examples of the "New Economy bubble" in Germany. The company value rose to $11 billion (US$) in 2000 and quickly fell to penny stock levels. Low earning warnings by Intershop caused widespread losses for other tech companies; in one instance, SAP's publicly listed shares fell by 8%. In 2001, an Intershop earnings warning spread through the sector, causing the stock exchange segment Neuer Markt (NEMAX 50) to slump nearly 10%. The company barely survived the crash but could keep operating and continue the development of products. About 30 spin-offs were founded, including Pixaco (later acquired by Hewlett-Packard), ePages, and Demandware (later acquired by Salesforce.com).
