= Hans-Reinhard Koch =

German Catholic priest and theologian

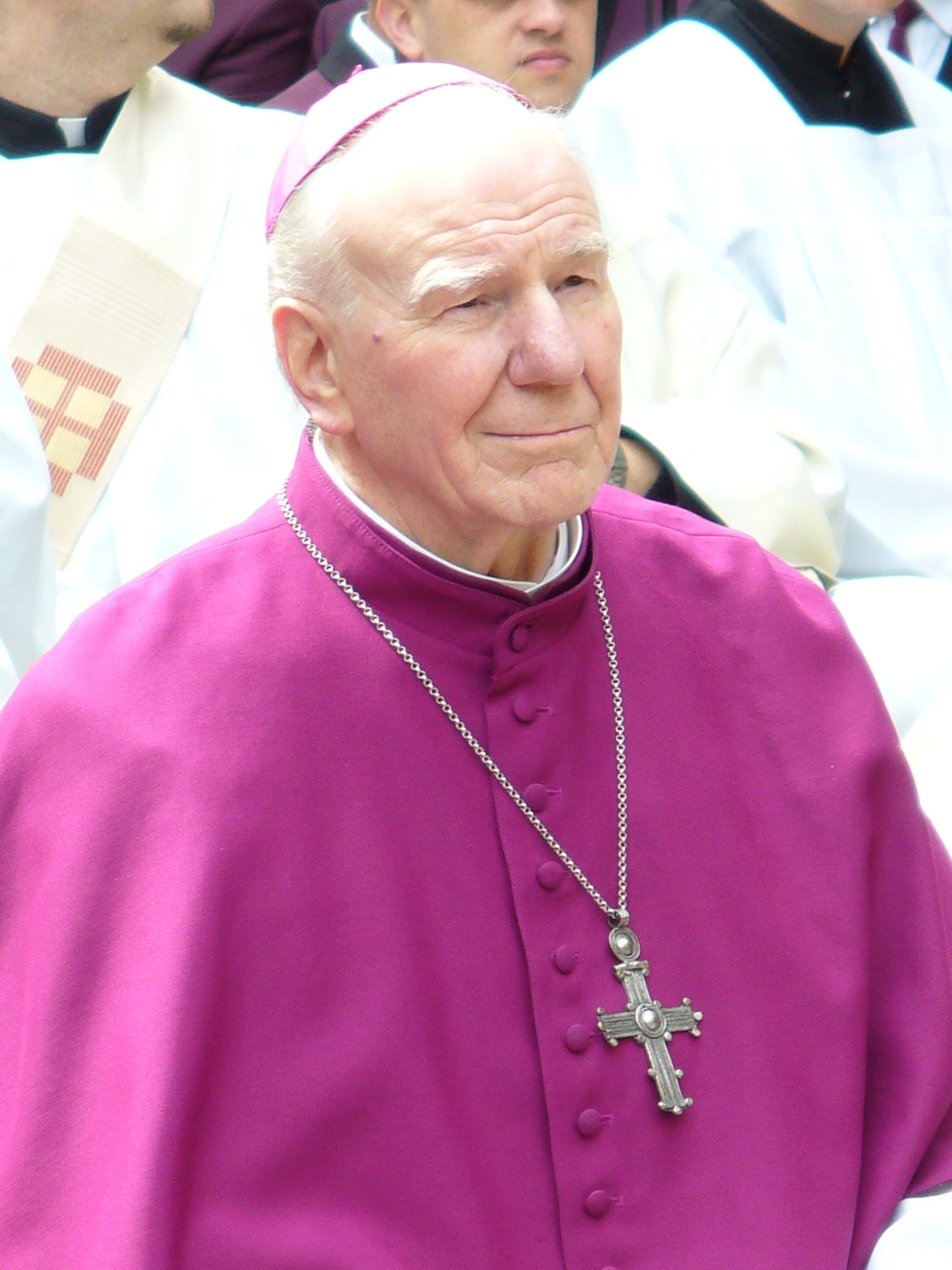
Hans-Reinhard Koch, 2007

Coat of arms of Hans-Reinhard Koch.

Hans-Reinhard Koch (27 November 1929 – 25 April 2018) was a German Roman Catholic prelate. Ordained to the priesthood in 1955, he served as titular bishop of Mediana and as auxiliary bishop of the Roman Catholic Diocese of Erfurt, Germany, from 1985 to 2004.

== Early life and education ==
Koch was born in Leinefelde in Thuringia as the son of dentist Adolf Koch and housewife Maria Koch. He had two older and two younger siblings. After elementary school in Leinefelde he completed secondary school in Heiligenstadt and Duderstadt where he received his abitur in 1950. He went on to study theology at the seminary in Fulda, Erfurt, and Neuzelle Abbey.

== Career ==
He was ordained priest by bishop Josef Freusberg in Erfurt Cathedral in 1955. After working as chaplain in Nordhausen, he got a position in Kölleda where he worked as pastor for youth in district of Sömmerda. In 1965, he started working at the seminary in Erfurt where he became in charge of the education of priests. In 1968, he started working at the diocesan chancery where he became administrator for priests and lay staff. He served as cathedral priest at Erfurt Cathedral from 1983.

He was appointed auxiliary apostolic administrator of Erfurt-Meiningen and titular bishop of Mediana in May 1985 and ordained bishop by apostolic administrator and titular Bishop Joachim Wanke on 6 July 1985. When the area became Roman Catholic Diocese of Erfurt in 1994, Koch became auxiliary bishop to Wanke. His motto as bishop, Illum oportet crescere, was derived from John 3:30 ("He must become greater; I must become less"). He retired in 2004 at the age 75, the statutory retirement age in the diocese.

== Personal life and awards ==
Koch continued to live in Erfurt after his retirement and enjoyed reading and art. He made a pilgrimage to the church of Klüschen Hagis in 2013, when he was more than 80 years old.

He served for many years on the board of the German Caritas (Deutscher Caritasverband). In 2009, he was awarded the highest award of the organization, the Silbernen Brottellers. He received the Order of Merit of the Free State of Thuringia from Christine Lieberknecht in 2010.

Koch was found unconscious in his home on 21 April 2018 and diagnosed with intracranial hemorrhage. He never regained consciousness, and died on 25 April 2018 at the age of 88.
