= Beethovenhalle =

Concert hall in Bonn, Germany

Coordinates: 50°44′27″N 7°06′18″E

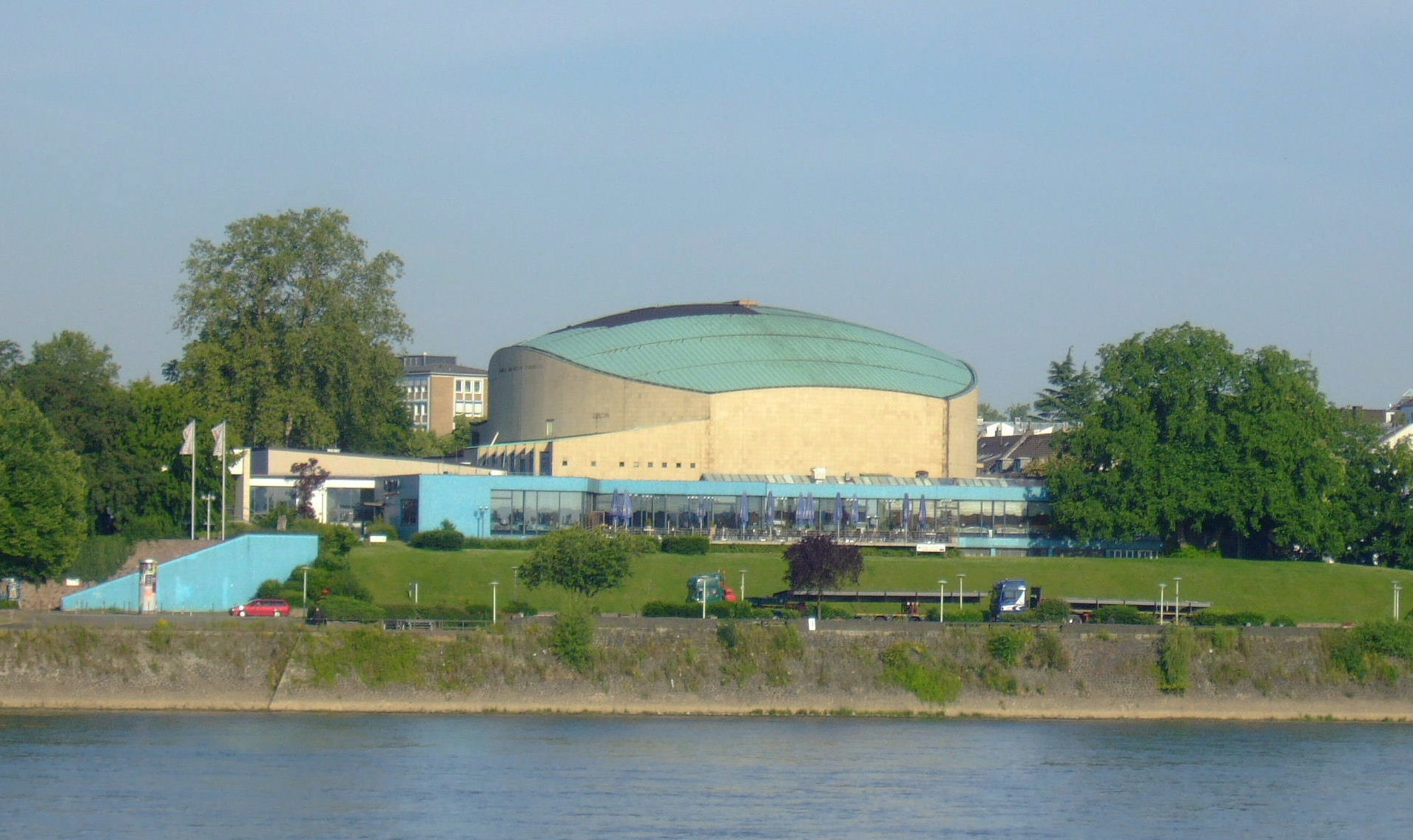
Beethovenhalle (2005) on the shores of the Rhine

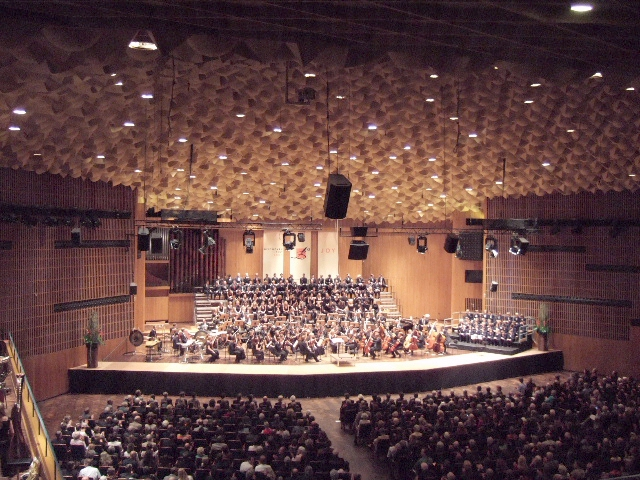
Großer Saal during Beethovenfest 2007

The Beethovenhalle (German: [ˈbeːthoːfn̩ˌhalə]) is a concert hall in Bonn. It is the third hall in the city to bear the name of the Bonn-born composer Ludwig van Beethoven. The initial building was constructed in 1845 to commemorate the unveilling of the Beethoven monument at Münsterplatz, and a second was erected in 1870 to mark the 100th birthday of Ludwig van Beethoven. The second formation was destroyed during the second world war. In 1950, plans were initiated to reconstruct the building.

The current Beethovenhalle, designed by Siegfried Wolske, was completed in September 1959 and has become an iconic landmark of the city. It is also considered one of the most significant structures in the young Federal Republic of Germany.

The concert hall promotes the legacy of Beethoven through musical performances and serves as the home hall for the Beethoven Orchester Bonn, hosting the opening and closing concerts of the annual Beethovenfest in its Great Hall. Beyond classical music concerts, the hall is utilised for various events, including carnivals, exhibitions, parties, congresses, celebrations, and conventions such as AnimagiC.

== Location ==
The Beethovenhalle is a cultural landmark located in the northern part of Bonn, Germany. Situated along the banks of the Rhine, the hall is easily accessible on foot from the inner Nordstadt and the city center.

The Beethovenhalle is located on a rectangular area stretching from Welschnonnenstrasse to the banks of the Rhine. It features outdoor facilities such as a parking lot in the northwestern section and a green area with trees designed by the Bonn landscape architect, Heinrich Raderschall. Some of the trees on the site date back to the 19th century. Towards the east, the green area slopes down a steep embankment towards the Rhine. The building itself has become an iconic feature of the cityscape, thanks to its elevated location and unique architecture, highlighted by a distinctive green dome that can be seen from afar. While Bonn boasts several sacred buildings, the Beethovenhalle is the only notable secular cultural building with a direct connection to the Rhine in the cities north of Lake Constance.

== History ==
=== First Hall ===
The history of the first Beethovenhalle, dates back to the 19th century, when a temporary structure was erected in 1845, serving as a temporary venue for the unveiling celebrations of the inauguration of the Beethoven Monument, located in the Münsterplatz. The building also served as a concert hall for Franz Liszt in thanks for his generous donations toward the Beethoven Monument.

Located on private property of the Räss' Garden, next to the Franciscan Church, it was designed and built by a team of 14 master craftsmen from Bonn, under the direction of the Köln Dom builder Ernst Friedrich Zwirner and architect Vincenz Statz. This building was constructed in the basilica style with wood, and boasted impressive acoustics. The construction was praised for its intricate handcrafted details. Within twelve days, 95 carpenters and decoraters had created the building with painted friezes, wall pannelling and other decorations. Despite being able to accommodate up to 3,000 people, the hall was sold for demolition a mere two months after the Beethoven Festival. This was due to concerns over fire safety, leading to the auctioning off of its building materials.

Today, the site of the first Beethoven Hall is occupied by the Viktoriabad, a cultural complex that pays homage to the musical and cultural legacy of Beethoven and Bonn.

=== Second Hall ===
In commemoration of the centennial celebration of renowned composer Ludwig van Beethoven's birth, a new hall was constructed on Vierecksplatz in Brückenstraße, now known as Berliner Freiheit 20–24. This decision was reached by the city council on 4 February 1870. A careful search was conducted for suitable locations to host the planned celebration. Among the options considered were the Protestant Kreuzkirche on Kaiserplatz, which was not yet completed at the time, the university auditorium, and the arcade courtyard of the university. Various entities including industrialist Joseph Drammer, the Bonn citizens' association, and a Beethoven stock association, engaged in discussions with the city as potential financiers for the project, proposing different ideas. After much deliberation, a new building plan was adopted on 3 March 1870, based on a financing proposal put forward by a Beethoven committee composed of 38 Bonn citizens, the city administration, and building contractor Joseph Engelskirchen. The foundation stone was laid on 2 April 1870, and Engelskirchen's design for the Beethovenhalle was implemented.

The construction of the building was primarily composed of fir wood, with a single-story Neoclassical stucco façade on the front. The façade was adorned with a gable-crowned arched portal, resembling the shape of the hall it enclosed. This structure was a three-aisled basilica, with a gallery located on its longer side. With a capacity of approximately 1500 attendees. It served as a venue for various events and performances. Notably, it was inaugurated on 17 December 1870, in honour of Beethoven's 100th birthday.

Ranked among the top musical centers in the world, the hall gained international recognition for its exceptional acoustics. However, it was not solely dedicated to promoting classical music, as it also hosted a wide range of events including poetry readings, boxing matches, and agricultural exhibitions. Iconic productions such as Max Reinhardt's Oedipus and the Oberammergau Passion Play were performed here as well. Other uses included university celebrations, carnival meetings, meetings of the Nazi Party, and Catholic days. In 1938, a marble bust of Beethoven, crafted by renowned artist Richard Lange and donated by Wilhelm Frick, the Reich Interior Minister, was unveiled.

During World War II the hall fell victim to a bomb attack on 18 October 1944 and was completely destroyed.

=== The New Hall ===
In order to fund the reconstruction project for a third Beethovenhalle, various activities and fundraising campaigns were held both domestically and internationally, beginning in 1950. In May 1950, a benefit festival screening was held at the Metropol to showcase the Austrian film Eroica. On 10 June 1950, the Bonner Rundschau helped raise money by displaying a wooden replica of the Bonn Bridge Man on Münsterplatz, accepting donations in exchange for viewing. Additionally, the Beethoven Bonn Donors' Association played a crucial role in supporting the construction of the new hall from 1951 onward. Numerous support campaigns took place in following years, attracting the participation of prominent artists, such as Elly Ney and Andor Foldes. One such campaign included a special concert at Carnegie Hall, New York, by Andor Foldes on 5 December 1956.

Due to the destruction of the previous hall during the war, when selecting a location for the new Beethoven Hall, the city discounted the possibility of rebuilding the hall in its original location as a feasible option. After careful consideration, on 19 January 1952, the city council's building committee recommended the new hall be built on the site of destroyed university clinics at the northern edge of the old town. This decision was officially approved by the city council on 21 March 1952.

To obtain the best designs for the new hall, an architectural competition was announced in January 1954. This competition attracted 109 architects from around the world. Under the direction of Otto Bartning and Paul Bonatz, the jury convened in August 1954 to evaluate the designs. Models were displayed in the hallways of the Ernst-Moritz-Arndt-Gymnasium and could be viewed by the public. However, six designs were eliminated in the first round due to missing documents. Another 42 models were unanimously eliminated after a first tour of the competition site. After four further rounds, 14 designs were shortlisted. These designs were kept anonymous through the use of code numbers. In the final round, envelopes containing the names of the designers were opened. The first prize was awarded to Siegfried Wolske, a 29-year-old German architect and student of Hans Scharoun. The second prize went to Berlin architects Willy Kreuer and Heinz Weden.

On 8 June 1955, the city council confirmed their decision to begin construction of the new 73,000 m^{3} concert hall in the city of Bonn. This decision was followed by the laying of the foundation stone for the 1,402 seater venue on 16 March 1956, a ceremonial event attended by then Federal President of Germany Theodor Heuss. In a certificate signed by Heuss for the foundation stone laying, the mayor of Bonn, Peter Maria Busen, and members of the city council expressed their desire for the new hall to become "an international centre for the cultivation of Beethovian music". The building was completed in 1959 with a total cost of 9.5 million DM. Of this, over 1 million DM had been collected through public fundraising or private contributions, in addition to contributions of 1 million DM from the national and state governments of North Rhine-Westphalia respectively, and a further 6.5 million DM contributed by the city council of Bonn.

The inauguration ceremony of the new hall took place on 8 September 1959, featuring Beethoven's Consecration of the House. Notable figures in attendance included the Federal President Theodor Heuss, Minister of Culture for North-Rhine Westfalia, Wener Schütz, and Mayor Wilhelm Daniels who gave speeches during the event. In addition, renowned composer Paul Hindemith personally conducted his work Nobilissima Visione.

Ten days after its inauguration, the Beethoven Festival (also referred to as Beethovenfest), was held for the first time in the new concert hall. The XXII edition of the festival featured acclaimed violinist, Yehudi Menuhin.

== Architecture ==
The Beethovenhalle building complex is a unique architectural construction consisting of a series of irregularly shaped cubes with varying roof pitches. These cubes are strategically placed around the central structure, the domed hall building. The central feature of the hall is its dome, which has been fashioned to rise like a wave from the banks of the Rhine. The dome stands at a height of 25 meters above the foundation. Spanning 36 meters in width and 49 meters in depth, the dome is a self-supporting steel structure that is covered in copper. The roof of the Beethovenhalle, which covers an area of 2000 square metres, underwent a major renovation in 1975 due to water damage. As part of the renovation, a wooden structure was installed under the roof to address the water damage, which slightly altered the height of the eaves. As a result, the roof now features seven steps in parallel to the Rhine, which intersect with the curve of the dome that runs from east to west. However, in 2007, a storm caused further damage to the roof, resulting in the middle step, or the center of the dome, being partially covered with a temporary material that does not match the surrounding aesthetics.

The components of the complex are separated from each other and subordinate to the dome, which governs the overall organisation of the space and the asymmetrical non-axial interior floor plan. The interior consists of a series of interconnected components, each with its own distinctive features and purposes. Located to the south of the Great Hall, is a transverse studio spanning 500 square meters. To the east of the Great Hall is a striking fan-shaped layout, and to the west is the chamber music hall, covering an area of 192 square meters with a trapezoidal floor plan. To the south of this, on an irregularly elongated square floor plan, is the 145 square metre lecture hall. The complex underwent an expansion in the mid-1990s, resulting in the addition of three seminar rooms.

== Spot for political and historical events ==
When Bonn was the capital of West Germany, the Beethovenhalle was often an important venue for political and historical events. The Bundesversammlung met in the hall on four occasions between 1974 and 1989 to elect the President of Germany. Since 1990, the Beethovenhalle has been a protected monument. In 1996, Siegfried Wolske oversaw renovations to the building for an estimated cost of DM 22.6 million (€11.55 million) that included adding three meeting rooms to the south wing.
