= Stephan Schambach =

German entrepreneur

- Born: August 1, 1970 (age 55); Erfurt, East Germany, Germany
- Occupations: Entrepreneur, Software engineer
- Known for: Created the first online shopping software in 1995

Stephan Schambach (1 August 1970) is a German entrepreneur and e-commerce pioneer who in 1995 created the first software package for online shopping which was called Intershop. In addition to being the founder of Intershop Communications, Schambach also founded Demandware and NewStore.

== Early life ==
Schambach grew up in East Germany, where he graduated from Polytechnic High School. After the fall of the Berlin Wall and the following monetary union, Schambach left his apprenticeship as a laboratory technician for physics and became a partner in the Hard & Soft Stanja KG in Jena.

== Career ==
In 1992, he founded the NetConsult Computer Systeme GmbH. After the first in-house development "Archive 2000," the company presented the ecommerce software "Intershop Online." NetConsult secured venture capital funding to guarantee further development and active international marketing measures. Further financial rounds enabled robust growth for more than a few hundred employees worldwide.

In 1996, Schambach established the first U.S. office for the company in Burlingame, CA near San Francisco. Prior to its IPO, Intershop software naming rights were acquired from the Swiss Intershop AG. Meanwhile, the company was renamed Intershop Communications. The IPO took place on the Neuer Markt in 1998 and on the U.S. NASDAQ technology stock exchange in 2000. Schambach ceded his position as chairman of the board in 2003.

In 2004, he founded the U.S. company, Demandware Inc., and offered the first ecommerce solution as a cloud service. Demandware was listed at the NYSE (New York Stock Exchange) in 2012. In 2016, Demandware was acquired by Salesforce for $2.8 billion.

In 2015 Stephan Schambach founded NewStore, Inc., a tech company that sells a cloud-based omnichannel platform to retailers to manage point of sale (POS), order management (OMS), clienteling, and inventory management. It was headquartered in Boston, MA with offices in New York City, as well as in the German cities Berlin, Hanover, and Erfurt.

In 2020, NewStore received $20M in strategic investment from Salesforce. The next year, in 2021, NewStore raised a Series B-1 financing round, receiving a $45 million investment from General Catalyst, Activant Capital, and Salesforce Ventures to support company growth. In April 2024, NewStore appointed Mike DeSimone as CEO with Schambach transitioning to Chairman of the Board.

== Other interests and recognition ==
In addition to his work as an entrepreneur, Schambach has committed himself to improving the environment for start-ups and high-growth companies in Germany. This includes improving the practices of funding and exit opportunities. Furthermore, he and the Intershop Foundation are major sponsors of the E-Commerce Chair at the University of Applied Sciences in Jena.

For his contribution to developing of the software industry in Thuringia, Germany, he received the Order of Merit of the Free State of Thuringia in 2000.
