= Yehoshua Büchler =

Slovak-Israeli historian (1929–2009)

Robert Yehoshua Büchler
- רוברט יהושע ביכלר
- Born: January 1, 1929; Topoľčany, Czechoslovakia
- Died: August 14, 2009 (aged 80); Lehavot Haviva, Israel
- Occupation: Historian
- Awards: Order of Merit of the Free State of Thuringia

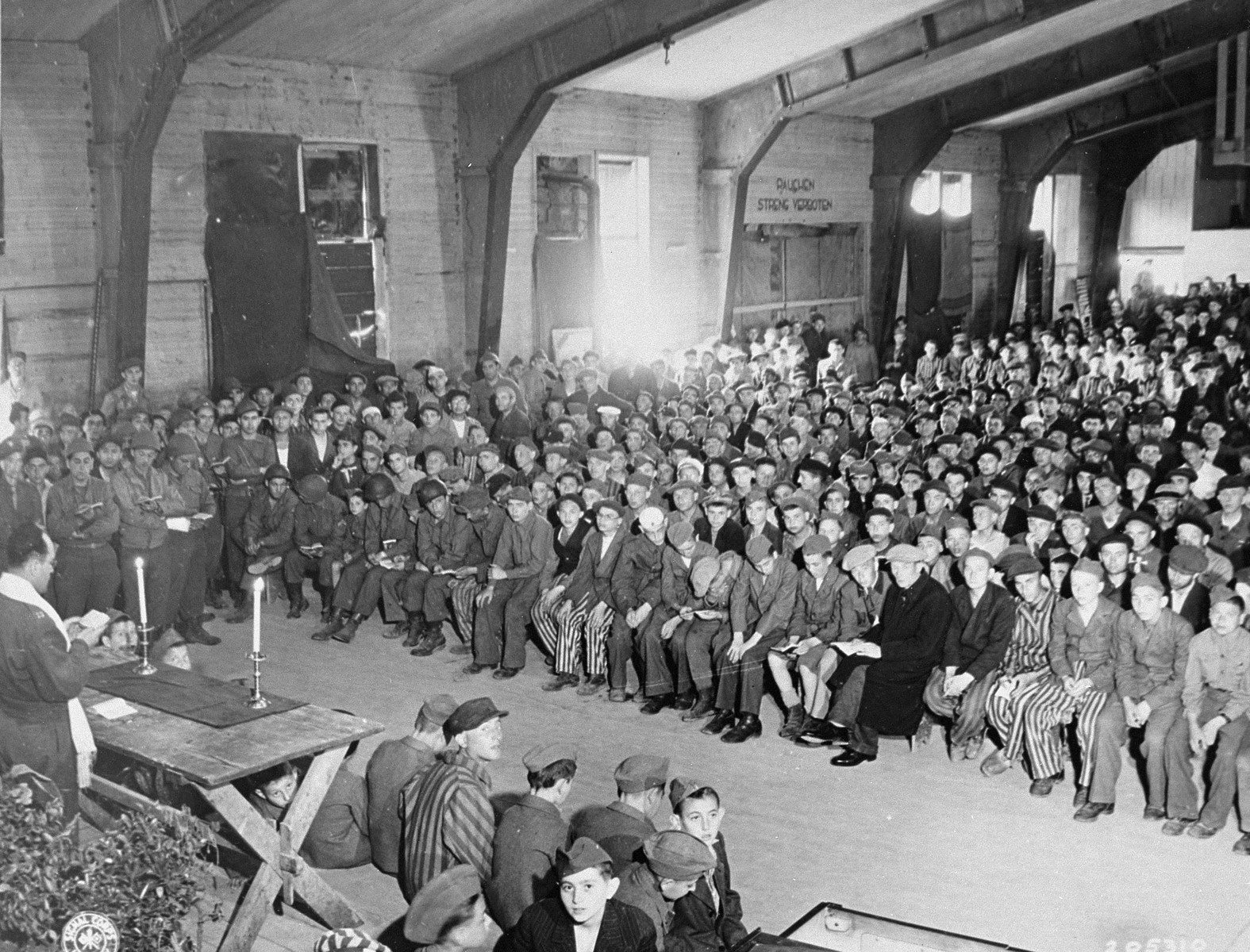
Büchler pictured in front row wearing shorts at a Shavuot service in recently liberated Buchenwald concentration camp, 18 May 1945

Robert Yehoshua Büchler (Hebrew: יהושע ביכלר; January 1, 1929 – August 14, 2009) was a Slovak-Israeli historian. In 1944, he was deported from Slovakia and survived Auschwitz and Buchenwald concentration camps. He was the director of the Moreshet Archive in Israel. Büchler was awarded the Order of Merit of the Free State of Thuringia.

== Works ==
- Büchler, Yehoshua Robert (1995). Topolčany: The Story of a Perished Ancient Community. Givat Haviva: Yad Yaari. OCLC 34310101.
