= Pillingsdorf =

- Ortsteil of Triptis
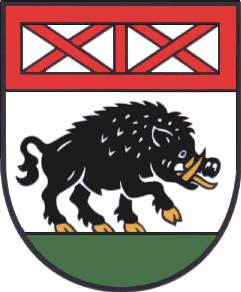
- Coat of arms
- Interactive map of Pillingsdorf
- Location within Germany Location within Thuringia
- Coordinates: 50°46′48″N 11°47′35″E
- Country: Germany
- State: Thuringia
- District: Saale-Orla-Kreis
- Town: Triptis
- Subdivisions: 2

Area
  - Total: 7.06 km^{2} (2.73 sq mi)
- Elevation: 310 m (1,020 ft)

Population (2010-12-31)
  - Total: 168
  - Density: 23.8/km^{2} (61.6/sq mi)
- Time zone: UTC+01:00 (CET)
  - Summer (DST): UTC+02:00 (CEST)
- Postal codes: 07819
- Dialling codes: 036481
- Vehicle registration: SOK
- Website: www.triptis.de

Pillingsdorf is a village and a former municipality in the district Saale-Orla-Kreis, in Thuringia, Germany. Since 1 January 2012, it is part of the town Triptis.
