= Werner Leich =

German Lutheran theologian (1927–2022)

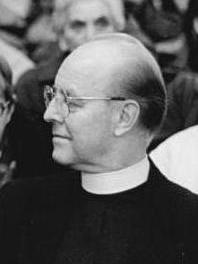
- Leich in 1989
- Born: 31 January 1927; Mühlhausen, Thuringia, Germany
- Died: 17 December 2022 (aged 95); Gotha, Thuringia, Germany
- Education: University of Marburg; University of Tübingen; Heidelberg University
- Occupations: Lutheran theologian; Landesbischof
- Awards: Order of Merit of the Free State of Thuringia; Four Freedoms Award

Werner Leich (31 January 1927 – 17 December 2022) was a German Protestant theologian and pastor. From 1978 to 1992, he was the longest-serving Landesbischof of the Lutheran Church in Thuringia during the era of the German Democratic Republic, and led the state church’s independence from the regime.

== Early life and education ==
Leich was born in Mühlhausen on 31 January 1927. His father was a jurist and the mayor of Schalkau, and his mother was a teacher; she died six months after he was born. Leich grew up living with his aunt and his grandmother in Weimar, until his father married again and integrated him into the new family in Schalkau. In 1939, his father lost his position as mayor due to arguments with the Nazi party, and was assigned to a minor position in Gotha. Leich was then educated at the Ernestine-Gymnasium there until 1942. In 1942, he left the school early to volunteer for the German Luftwaffe, and by 1945 had risen to the rank of Fahnenjunker. After World War II, he first trained to be a metalworker. He returned to his school, earning his Abitur in 1946. He met his future wife, Trautel Sickert, during a ball at a dancing school In 1947 he began studying theology at the University of Marburg with Rudolf Bultmann. He completed his studies at the Heidelberg University from 1950 to 1951, studying with Edmund Schlink.

== Professional career ==
In 1951, Leich entered his first post as a vicar in Angelroda. A year later, he and his wife married; they had two children. He became pastor in Wurzbach in 1954. From 1960 he was a member of the synod of the Lutheran Church in Thuringia, and the synod's vice-president from 1967 to 1978. From 1978 to 1992, he was bishop of the Lutheran Church in Thuringia, holding the position longer than anyone during the era of the German Democratic Republic (GDR).

In 1983 Leich, along with Erich Honecker, reopened the Wartburg castle after its restoration. He was also the leading bishop of the united Lutheran churches in the GDR from 1983 to 1986, and president of the conference of Protestant church leaderships (Vorsitzender der Konferenz der evangelischen Kirchenleitungen) in the GDR from 1986 to 1990. For much of his career, Leich defended worshipping God in an anti-religious communist environment, saying of this, "a lot of times we did hide being Christians". Leich promoted ecumenism. He steered a firm course of independence of state and church. On 3 March 1988, he met with Honecker, demanding social reforms in the GDR. The Lutheran Church had offered an avenue for critics of the regime and people who wanted to leave the country to make their demands public, but its Berlin office was closed due to over-crowding. After the spring of 1989, he no longer used the slogan "Kirche im Sozialismus". He is remembered as a proponent of the Peaceful Revolution.

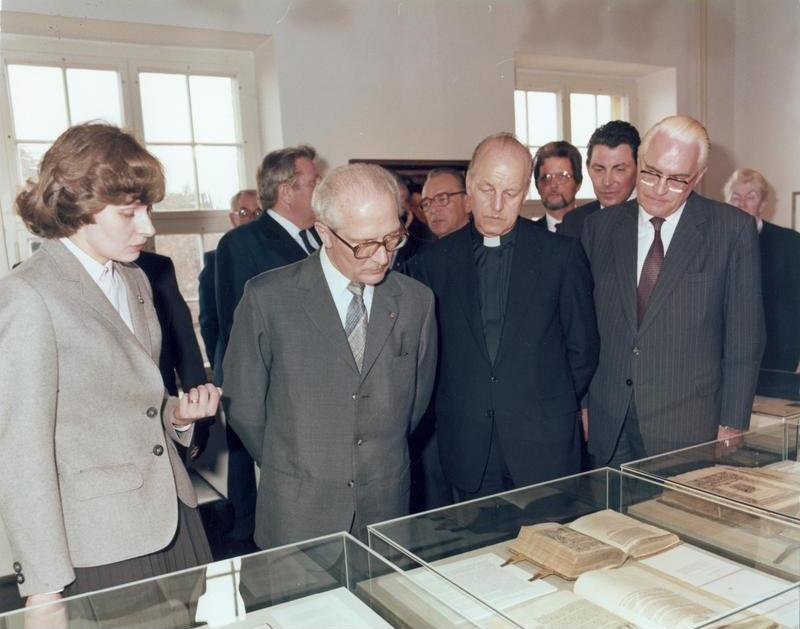
Reopening of the Wartburg, Honecker (2nd from l.) and Leich, 1983

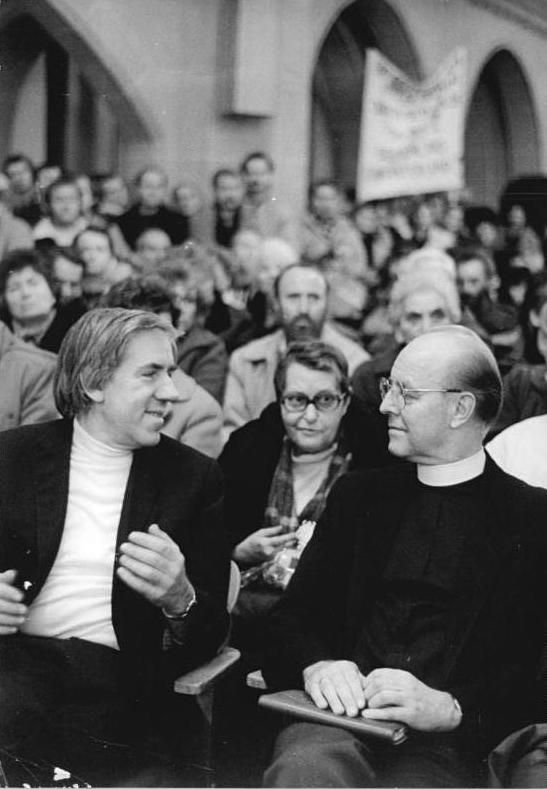
Peace prayer in the Johanniskirche in Gera; Joachim Urbig (l.), Leich

== Personal life ==
Leich retired in 1992, and published an autobiography, Wechselnde Horizonte. Mein Leben in vier politischen Systemen (Changing Horizons: My Life in Four Political Systems). He took care of his wife until her death in 2021.

Leich died at a hospital in Gotha after a short illness, on 17 December 2022 at age 95.

== Awards ==
In 1984 he received the Four Freedoms Award for the Freedom of Worship. In 2005, he was awarded the Order of Merit of the Free State of Thuringia.

== Autobiography ==
- 1992: Wechselnde Horizonte. Mein Leben in vier politischen Systemen. (in German) (ISBN 9783417241259)
