= Evangelical Church of the Church Province of Saxony =

The Evangelical Church of the Church Province of Saxony (German: Evangelische Kirche der Kirchenprovinz Sachsen, KPS) was the most important Protestant denomination in the German Province of Saxony, also known as Prussian Saxony (1816–1944) and state of Saxony-Anhalt (from 1945). As a united Protestant church, it combined both Lutheran and Reformed traditions (Prussian Union). On 1 January 2009 the church body merged with the Evangelical Lutheran Church in Thuringia into the Evangelical Church in Central Germany.

== History ==
The Evangelical Church of the Church Province of Saxony emerged on 1 October 1950, when the ecclesiastical province of Saxony within the Evangelical Church of the old-Prussian Union assumed its independence as church body of its own. The history of the old-Prussian Union is tied with the history of the kingdom of Prussia.

Following the second constitution of the German Democratic Republic (GDR), enacted on 9 April 1968 and accounting for its de facto transformation into a communist dictatorship, the church bodies were deprived their status as statutory bodies (German: Körperschaft des öffentlichen Rechts) and the church tax, automatically collecting parishioners' contributions as a surcharge on the income tax, was abolished. Now parishioners had to fix the level of their contributions and to transfer them again and again on their own. This together with ongoing discrimination of church members, which let many secede from the church, effectively eroded the adherence of parishioners and the financial situation of the Evangelical Church.

The Evangelical Church of the Church Province of Saxony was a full member of the Protestant Church in Germany (Evangelische Kirche in Deutschland, EKD). The leader of the church was bishop Axel Noack (2006). The church had approx. 504,200 members (in December 2005) in 2,020 church parishes.

The seat of the bishop was Magdeburg Cathedral. There are several former cathedrals in the territory retaining their original name, notably the Halberstadt Cathedral, the Merseburg Cathedral, the Naumburg Cathedral and Zeitz Cathedral. There are also some other imposing churches (often former collegiate churches) called "Dom" (often translated as cathedral) in the area.

The Evangelical Church of the Church Province of Saxony was a member of the Union of Evangelical Churches in Germany and the Community of Protestant Churches in Europe. In Wittenberg the church had its own academy.

The Ordination of women and the blessing of same-sex unions has been allowed.

Since 1 July 2004 the church was on the way to merge with the Evangelical Lutheran Church in Thuringia into the Evangelical Church in Central Germany, with effect of 1 January 2009.

== Area covered ==
The area covered by the Evangelical Church of the Church Province of Saxony was equivalent to the old Prussian Saxony province, similar to the East German state of Saxony-Anhalt (1946–1952; except of former Anhalt) and small parts of the states of Brandenburg and Thuringia.

== General superintendents and bishops ==
The chief executive body was the consistory in Magdeburg, however, there were three more consistories with regional competence in Roßla (for the Lutheran church of the mediatised County of Stolberg-Rossla; 1719–1947 then merged with the following), in Stolberg at the Harz (for the Lutheran church of the mediatised County of Stolberg-Stolberg; 1553–2005, then merged into the consistory in Magdeburg) and in Wernigerode (for the Lutheran church of the mediatised County of Stolberg-Wernigerode; 1658–1930, then merged into the consistory in Magdeburg). A consistorial president chaired the consistory as an executive, as to the spiritual leadership there was one general superintendent, supported by a second and a third general superintendent (as of 1867 and 1911, respectively). Some holders of the general superintendency were royally styled as bishop, then still considered a rather non-Protestant title. In 1933 Nazi-submissive German Christians, then dominating the legislative general and provincial synods, introduced the title bishop for the spiritual leaders, including their hierarchical supremacy over other church collaborators. The title was retained also after the end of the Nazi dictatorship, however, without any hierarchical supremacy.

=== General superintendents till 1867 ===
- 1802–1815: Johann Konrad Christoph Nachtigall for the Principality of Halberstadt seated in Halberstadt
- 1790–1817: Karl Ludwig Nitzsch for the Saxon Electoral Circle seated in Wittenberg on the Elbe
- 1823–1829: Ernst Friedrich Gabriel Ribbeck for the Governorate of Erfurt seated in Erfurt
- 1812–1831: Franz Bogislaus Westermeier for the Elbe department seated in Magdeburg, styled bishop as of 1826, directing the royal consistory in Magdeburg since 1829
- 1832–1843: Johann Heinrich Bernhard Draesecke, styled bishop
- 1843–1858: Johann Friedrich Möller
- 1858–1866: Johann Ludwig Daniel Karl Lehnerdt (1803–1866)

=== General superintendents, 1st office (1867–1933) ===
- 1867–1890: Ludwig Carl Möller
- 1891–1893: Leopold Schultze
- 1893–1899: Ernst Adolf Friedrich Textor
- 1899–1909: Karl Heinrich Vieregge
- 1909–1924: Justus Julius August Jacobi (1850–1937)
- 1925–1929: Otto Heinrich Meyer
- 1929–1933: Johannes Eger (1873–1954)

=== General superintendents, 2nd office (1867–1933) ===
- 1867–1870: Ludwig Johann Carl Borghardt
- 1871–1891: Leopold Schultze
- 1891–1893: Ernst Adolf Friedrich Textor
- 1894–1899: Karl Heinrich Vieregge
- 1899–1906: Otto Gottlob Albin Holtzheuer (1836–1906)
- 1907–1909: August Julius Justus Jacobi (1850–1937)
- 1909–1933: Max Ludwig August Hermann Stolte (1863–1937), Magdeburg Cathedral preacher

=== General superintendents, 3rd office (1912–1933) ===
- 1912–1917: Paul Johannes Gennrich
- 1917–1931: Johannes Ludolf Theodor Schöttler
- 1931–1933: Karl Lohmann

=== Bishops (1933–2008) ===
- 1933–1936?: Friedrich Peter, bishop according to the new church laws legislated by the German Christians majority in the old-Prussian general synod on 6 September 1933
- 1936?–1947: vacancy due to the struggle of the churches with the Nazi state and Nazi-submissive church functionaries against protagonists of the Confessing Church
- 1947–1955: Ludolf Hermann Müller
- 1955–1968: Johannes Jänicke
- 1968–1983: Werner Krusche
- 1983–1997: Christoph Demke
- 1997–2008: Axel Noack

== Synod ==
The election of the synod was for six years. The synod met each year for one meeting. The elected leader of the "provincial synod" was called Präses (preases).

=== Praesides of the synod ===
Praesides (since 1946):

- 1946 – 1947: Ludolf Hermann Müller (later bishop)
- 1947 – 1964: Lothar Kreyssig
- 1964 – 1980: Helmut Waitz
- 1980 – 1994: Reinhard Höppner
- 1994 – 2004: Jürgen Runge
- 2004 – 2009: Petra Gunst
