= Evangelical Lutheran Church in Thuringia =

Church in Germany

The Evangelical Lutheran Church in Thuringia (German: Evangelisch-Lutherische Kirche in Thüringen) was a Lutheran member church of the umbrella Protestant Church in Germany (Evangelische Kirche in Deutschland, EKD). The seat of the church was in Eisenach. The church covered those parts of the state of Thuringia that were not part of the former Province of Saxony. It was the largest Protestant denomination in this area.

== History ==
After in early November 1918 the grand duke, the dukes and princes of the eight monarchies, later merging into the new State of Thuringia, had abdicated and thus released each of the eight territorial Lutheran church bodies from their respective supreme governorate (summepiscopacy), Lutheran church leaders, among them the Saxe-Altenburgian court preacher Wilhelm Reichardt as one of the driving forces, decided the unification of the church bodies on 15 November 1918. Within seven of these Lutheran church bodies majorities formed to merge, to wit:

- Evangelical Lutheran Church of the Principality of Reuss Junior Line (Evangelisch-lutherische Kirche des Fürstentums Reuß jüngere Linie)
- Evangelical Lutheran Church of the Duchy of Saxe-Gotha (Evangelisch-lutherische Kirche des Herzogtums Sachsen-Gotha)
- Evangelical Lutheran Church of the Duchy of Saxe-Altenburg (Evangelisch-lutherische Kirche des Herzogtums Sachsen-Altenburg)
- Evangelical Lutheran Church of the Duchy of Saxe-Meiningen (Evangelisch-lutherische Kirche des Herzogtums Sachsen-Meiningen)
- Evangelical Lutheran Church of the Grand Duchy of Saxony (Evangelisch-lutherische Kirche des Großherzogtums Sachsen)
- Evangelical Lutheran Church of the Principality of Schwarzburg-Rudolstadt (Evangelisch-lutherische Kirche des Fürstentums Schwarzburg-Rudolstadt) and
- Evangelical Lutheran Church of the Principality of Schwarzburg-Sondershausen (Evangelisch-lutherische Kirche des Fürstentums Schwarzburg-Sondershausen).

Only the Evangelical Lutheran Church of the Principality of Reuss Elder Line (Evangelisch-lutherische Kirche des Fürstentums Reuß ältere Linie) refused the merger and renamed as the Evangelical Lutheran Church in Reuss Elder Line (German: Evangelisch-lutherische Kirche in Reuß ältere Linie). On 5 December 1919 synodals from the seven other church bodies then convened for the constitutive synod, founding the Thuringian Evangelical Church (Thüringer evangelische Kirche), a Lutheran church body, with effect of 13 February 1920 and Reichardt as its spiritual leader then titled state supreme pastor (Landesoberpfarrer). Three months later all the eight former monarchies merged into the new state of Thuringia.

In 1922 the Thuringian Evangelical Church became a member of the German Evangelical Church Confederation, which was dissolved in 1933 in favour of a united Protestant church for all of Germany, which, however, never materialised due to inner church struggles on the Nazi intrusion in ecclesiastical affairs.

The parishioners within the Thuringia church body voted by a majority for candidates of the Nazi-submissive German Christians in the presbyteries and the synod in the unconstitutional reelection imposed by Hitler on 23 July 1933. Nazi opponents then formed the Confessing Church of Thuringia, gradually pressed into hiding. In 1934 the Evangelical Lutheran Church in Reuss Elder Line with 70,000 parishioners (as of 1922) merged in the Thuringian Evangelical Church, which thus comprised all the area of the state of Thuringia in its borders of 1920. During the struggle of the churches the official submissive church leadership even further radicalised in its extremism as to anti-Semitism and suppression of confessing church adherents.

In 1933 Reichardt adopted the title of a state bishop (Landesbischof) and deprived the synod of its legislative rights. Martin Sasse succeeded Reichardt after his retirement in 1934. After Sasse's death in 1942 the quarrelling fractions within the Thuringian German Christians blocked the appointment of a new state bishop, but Hugo Rönck, the head of the central church administration, assumed the leadership using the title church president. With the defeat of the Nazis in sight Confessing Church members within the Thuringia church body urged Rönck to resign in April 1945 and the US occupying power later arrested him only days after. In May 1945 Moritz Mitzenheim succeeded Rönck again using the constitutional title state supreme pastor. In August 1945 Mitzenheim participated for the Thuringian Evangelical Church in a meeting in Treysa, where the foundation of a new Protestant umbrella, the Protestant Church in Germany (EKD) was decided, of which the Thuringian Evangelical Church became a founding member.

In 1948 the church body renamed into the Evangelical Lutheran Church in Thuringia. An orderly synod legalised the new title state bishop (Landesbischof), later used by Mitzenheim. He turned out to be a rather uncritical collaborator of the upcoming communist dictatorship. Under the influence of the high church functionary and later state bishop Ingo Braecklein, the Evangelical Lutheran Church in Thuringia seceded from the Protestant Church in Germany (EKD) and prompted the foundation of the Confederation of Protestant Churches in the GDR (Bund der Evangelischen Kirchen in der DDR) in 1969. In 1991 that confederation was dissolved again and the Evangelical Lutheran Church in Thuringia rejoined the EKD.

Between 1945 and 1969 and again from 1991 to 2008 the church was also a full member of the United Evangelical Lutheran Church of Germany (VELKD) and since 1973 also of the Community of Protestant Churches in Europe. The church body was based on the teachings brought forward by Martin Luther during the Reformation.

In December 2006 the church body had approx. 440,000 parishioners in 1,308 church parishes. There was no cathedral church. The church had its own academy in Neudietendorf.

On 1 July 2004 the church announced its intention to merge with the Evangelical Church of the Church Province of Saxony to form the new Evangelical Church in Central Germany. The merger was completed on 1 January 2009.

== Spiritual leaders ==
- 1920–1934: Wilhelm Reichardt, titled Landesoberpfarrer (state supreme pastor), then - after July 1933 - Landesbischof (state bishop)
- 1934–1942: Martin Sasse, title state bishop
- 1942–1945: vacancy
  - 1943–1945: Hugo Rönck per pro, Kirchenpräsident (church president), usurping the title of state bishop in early 1945, forced to resign in April 1945
- 1945–1970: Moritz Mitzenheim, at first titled state supreme pastor, then state bishop
- 1970–1978: Ingo Braecklein, state bishop
- 1978–1992: Werner Leich, state bishop
- 1992–2001: Roland Hoffmann, state bishop
- 2001–2008: Christoph Kähler, state bishop

== Parishioners ==
- 1922: 1,384,000
- 2006: 440,000
