= Magdalene of Nassau-Siegen (1596–1662) =

German countess (1596–1662)

- Freifrau von Oeynhausen-Velmede; Freifrau von Innhausen und Knyphausen
- Coat of arms
- Full name: Magdalene Countess of Nassau-Siegen
- Native name: Magdalena Gräfin von Nassau-Siegen
- Born: Magdalena Gräfin zu Nassau, Katzenelnbogen, Vianden und Diez, Frau zu Beilstein; 23 February 1596
- Died: 6 December 1662 (aged 66)
- Noble family: House of Nassau-Siegen
- Spouses: Bernhard Moritz Freiherr von Oeynhausen-Velmede; Philipp Wilhelm Freiherr von Innhausen und Knyphausen
- Issue: ?
- Father: John VII 'the Middle' of Nassau-Siegen
- Mother: Magdalene of Waldeck-Wildungen

Countess Magdalene of Nassau-Siegen (23 February 1596 – 6 December 1662), German: Magdalena Gräfin von Nassau-Siegen, official titles: Gräfin zu Nassau, Katzenelnbogen, Vianden und Diez, Frau zu Beilstein, was a countess from the House of Nassau-Siegen, a cadet branch of the Ottonian Line of the House of Nassau, and through marriage successively member of the families von Oeynhausen, and von Innhausen und Knyphausen.

== Biography ==
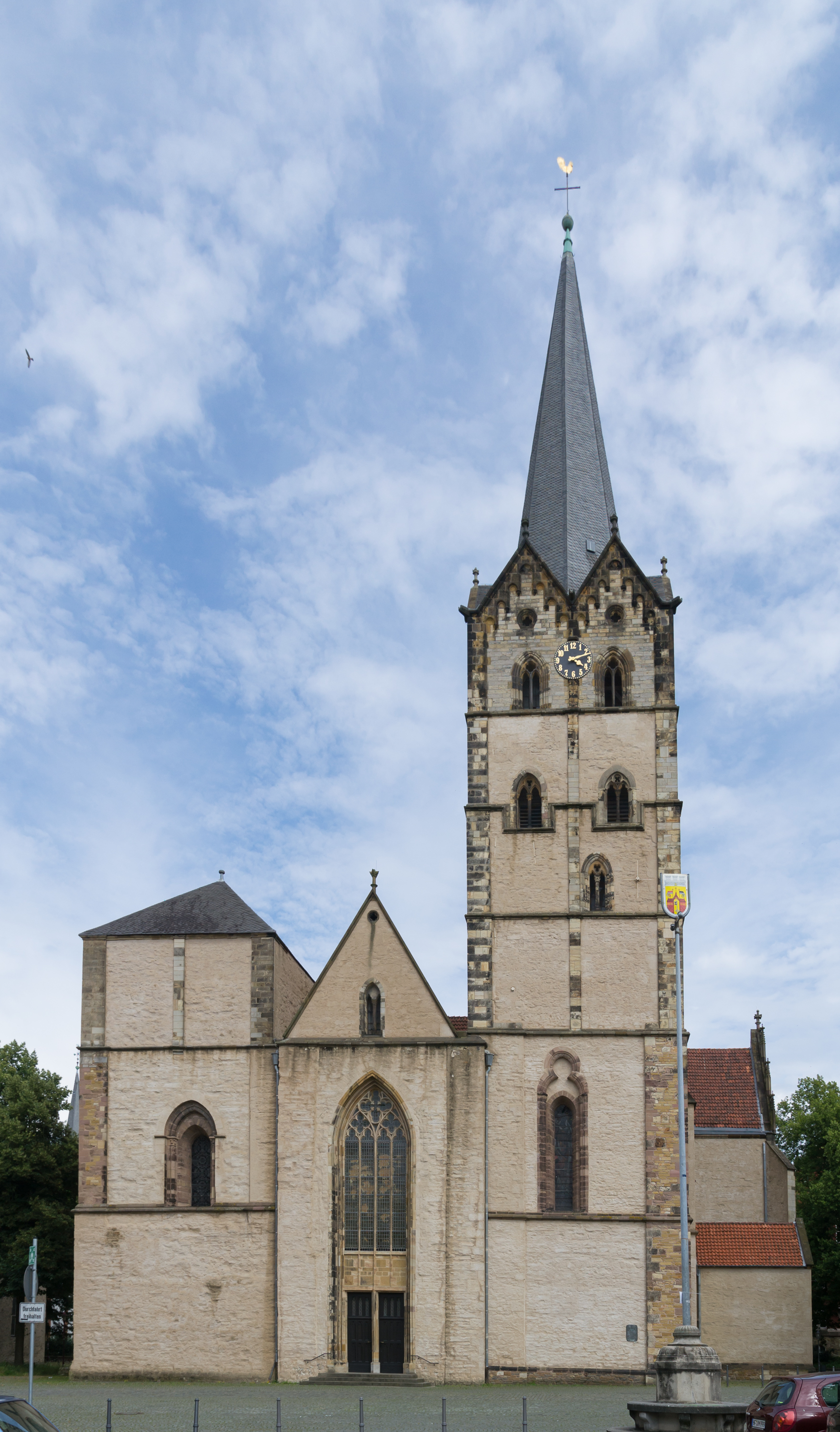
Herford Abbey, 2014.

Magdalene was born on 23 February 1596 as the fifth and youngest daughter of Count John VII 'the Middle' of Nassau-Siegen and his first wife, Countess Magdalene of Waldeck-Wildungen. From 1622 Magdalene spent most of her time in Herford Abbey, where she held the office of deaconess since 1628.

From the inheritance of her parents, Magdalena could claim 6875 guilders, on which Orange-Nassau paid 343 guilders in interest, as well as 100 guilders of annual expenses until her marriage and 200 guilders after her marriage. She claimed 4000 guilders in matrimonial money, 1000 guilders in dowry, and 1500 guilders for hat-strings, wedding ring, coach and horse. However, all these monies were paid out very slowly and Magdalena was forced to exhort the Nassau councillors almost constantly to get her money. In general, her life gives a sad picture of the internal relations of the small royal houses during the Thirty Years' War – a picture of impoverishment and helplessness.

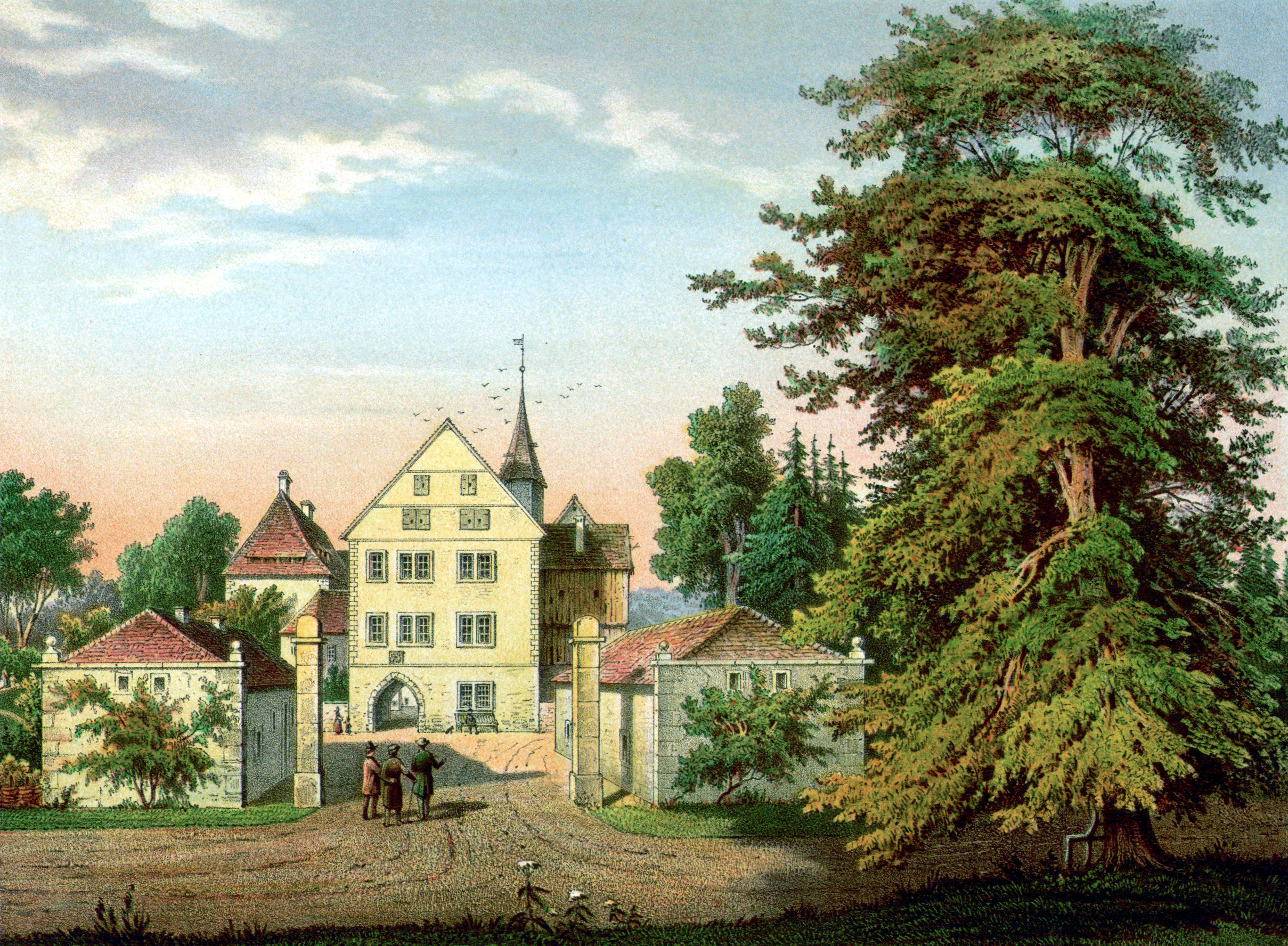
Grevenburg Manor, dower of Magdalene. Painting by Alexander Duncker, 1857–1883.

Magdalene married in August 1631 to Bernhard Moritz Freiherr von Oeynhausen-Velmede (Note: "It seems that Dek (1970) wrongly attributed the title of count to him. In von Oeynhausen & Grotefend (1889) he is called baron of the empire.") (1602 – Leipzig, 20 November 1632). After the death of her husband, Magdalene went to the dower Grevenburg Manor, where in March 1633 Count Simon Louis of Lippe-Detmold obtained a sauvegarde for her from Landgrave William V of Hesse-Kassel, requesting the landgrave not to use her husband's services on the imperial side against her.

In the summer of 1634 her brother-in-law Rab Arnd von Oeyhausen died, at whose deathbed she stood, thus depriving Magdalene of her last male patron. At the same time, the most fierce disputes arose over the acquired part of Grevenburg Manor, which was taken into possession both by the Countess and her mother-in-law and sisters-in-law, supported by their patroness, the Countess of Schaumburg, née Countess of Lippe-Varenholz, as well as Adam Arnd von Oeynhausen as the next and rightful heir to the fief. Both parties now turned to Count Simon Louis of Lippe-Detmold, who was closely related to Magdalene through his mother, (Note: Countess Anne Catherine of Nassau-Idstein, the mother of Count Simon Louis of Lippe-Detmold was a first cousin of Magdalene. Besides that Simon Louis was married to Countess Catherine of Waldeck-Wildungen, daughter of Magdalene's eldest sister Elisabeth.) but who was also the feudal lord of Grevenburg Manor. Also Landgrave George II of Hesse-Darmstadt appealed to him in May 1635 in favour of the heirs of the now deceased Adam Arnd von Oeynhausen.

Magdalene's letters express everywhere her deep love for her deceased husband, "mit dem sie nur sechs Monate zu Grevenburg gewohnt habe" ("with whom she only lived six months in Grevenburg") and in a confidential letter to Count Simon Louis of Lippe-Detmold, probably dated 20 November 1635, she wrote:

"Ich bin so von ganzem Herzen betrübt, ich weiß mir keinen Rath mehr. Heute ist der unglückselige Tag der Jahrzeit, daß ich in den elenden Stand meiner Trübseligkeit getreten bin und mit dem, so ich in der Welt über Alles geliebet, alles meines Glückes und Wohlfahrt beraubet bin, und keinen andern Trost weiß ich zu finden, als in Glauben und Hoffnung zu leben, der liebe Gott werde uns in ewiger Freude wieder zusammenbringen." (English translation: "I am so wholeheartedly saddened, I no longer know what to do. Today is the unhappy day of the year that I have entered the miserable state of my unhappiness and with the one I loved more than anything in the world, all my happiness and well-being have been taken away from me, and no other consolation I know to find than to live in faith and hope that the good God will bring us together again in eternal peace.")

At the same time Magdalene also showed the best will towards her relatives to settle the disputes amicably and she sincerely regretted the death of Adam Arnd von Oeynhausen in April 1635. Shortly afterwards, on 20 June 1635, Grevenburg Manor was thoroughly ransacked by the Swedes and Magdalene and her niece Countess Louise of Waldeck-Wildungen (Note: Countess Louise of Waldeck-Wildungen was the youngest daughter of Magdalene's eldest sister Elisabeth.) were robbed of all their possessions. For the following years there is no further information available about Magdalene.

Magdalene remarried on 25 August 1642 to Philipp Wilhelm Freiherr von Innhausen und Knyphausen (20 March 1591 – Bremen, 5 May 1652). About this marriage she wrote to the Nassau government in the same year:

"Sie habe viel Jammer und Elend ausstehen müssen und wegen Nichteinbringung ihrer Ehegelder sei sie von den Angehörigen ihres ersten Ehemannes sehr übel gehalten und ihr gedroht, sie aus dem Witthum zu stoßen. Dies habe sie sich zu Herzen gezogen und weil es der Höchste so geschickt, daß der Wohlgeborene Philipp Wilhelm Freiherr zu Knyphausen sie zur Ehe begehrt, so habe sie ihren früher gefaßten Entschluß, ihr mühseliges Leben im Wittwenstande endigen zu wollen, soweit geändert und damit sie ein sicheres Bleibens habe, in die Heirath gewilligt. Sie wolle nun nach Hamburg wo ihr Gemahl jetßt seine Wohnung habe." (English translation: "She had had to endure much misery and hardship, and because she had failed to pay her marriage fees, she was treated very badly by the relatives of her first husband, who threatened to expel her from her dower. This she had taken to heart and because the Almighty had it arranged that the well-born Philipp Wilhelm Freiherr zu Knyphausen wanted to marry her, so she had changed her earlier decision to want to end her arduous life in widowhood and so that she would have a secure place to stay, had consented to the marriage. She now wants to go to Hamburg where her husband currently has his residence.")

In 1651 Magdalene filed a claim against Johann Melchior von Oeynhausen for arrears in the usufruct of Grevenburg Manor. On 5 May 1652 her second husband also died and the financial problems started again. On 27 July of that year she wrote again to Johann Melchior about her claims and described her distressed situation, since the contract between her husband and Count Anton Günther of Oldenburg had not come to fruition and he therefore did not want to pay out any money. In 1656 she wrote to Nassau that the means of her second husband were not great and she had to make do with a small amount. She also complained a lot about the arrears that Orange-Nassau still had to pay her. In that same year she was given the hope that she would be paid if she would reduce her demands a little. At that time, she demanded a total of 45,496 guilders in capital, interest and debt.

Magdalene died on 6 December 1662, (Note: "The date of death given by Europäische Stammtafeln seems very plausible. On the other hand, we cannot accept the indication by Dek (1970) that the countess died in Bremen on 31-7-1661. We found a copy of the will with codicil in the State Archives Marburg (115, Waldeck 2, Nassau 343). The countess testified in Verden on 4-4-1658 and on 29-11-1662. There is therefore every reason to assume that she died in that town.") probably in Verden, where she made her will and testament in 1658, bequeathing a capital of 600 thaler, which the town of Steinheim owed her, to the gasthuis and orphanage in Bremen. On 29 November 1662 she made a second will.

== Children ==
The biography of Magdalene in von Oeynhausen & Grotefend (1889) does not show that children were born from her marriage to Bernhard Moritz von Oeynhausen-Velmede. After all, after the death of her brother-in-law, there is talk of an heir from another branch of the family. Dek (1968), p. 277, however, mentions that Magdalene had two children in the 15 months that the marriage lasted:

1. Bernhard Simon, married to Katharina von Steinberg.
2. Rab Arnd, married to Gertruda von Steinberg.

The marriage of Magdalene and Philipp Wilhelm von Innhausen und Knyphausen remained childless.

== Ancestors ==
Ancestors of Magdalene of Nassau-Siegen
Great-great-grandparents	John V of Nassau-Siegen (1455–1516) ⚭ 1482; Elisabeth of Hesse-Marburg (1466–1523)	Bodo III 'the Blissful' of Stolberg-Wernigerode (1467–1538) ⚭ 1500; Anne of Eppstein-Königstein (1481–1538)	John IV of Leuchtenberg (1470–1531) ⚭ 1502; Margaret of Schwarzburg-Blankenburg (1482–1518)	Frederick V 'the Elder' of Brandenburg-Ansbach (1460–1536) ⚭ 1479; Sophia of Poland (1464–1512)	Philip I of Waldeck-Waldeck (1445–1475) ⚭ 1464; Joanne of Nassau-Siegen (1444–1468)	William of Runkel (?–1489) ⚭ 1454; Irmgard of Rollingen (?–1514)	Gerlach II of Isenburg-Grenzau (?–1500) ⚭ 1455; Hildegard of Sierck (?–1490)	Henry of Hunolstein-Neumagen (?–1486) ⚭ 1466; Elisabeth de Boulay (?–1507)
Great-grandparents	William I 'the Rich' of Nassau-Siegen (1487–1559) ⚭ 1531; Juliane of Stolberg-Wernigerode (1506–1580)		George III of Leuchtenberg (1502–1555) ⚭ 1528; Barbara of Brandenburg-Ansbach (1495–1552)		Henry VIII of Waldeck-Wildungen (1465–1513) ⚭ before 1492; Anastasia of Runkel (?–1502/03)		Salentin VII of Isenburg-Grenzau (before 1470–1534) ⚭ Elisabeth of Hunolstein-Neumagen (c. 1475–1536/38)	
Grandparents	John VI 'the Elder' of Nassau-Siegen (1536–1606) ⚭ 1559; Elisabeth of Leuchtenberg (1537–1579)				Philip IV of Waldeck-Wildungen (1493–1574) ⚭ 1554; Jutta of Isenburg-Grenzau (?–1564)			
Parents	John VII 'the Middle' of Nassau-Siegen (1561–1623) ⚭ 1581; Magdalene of Waldeck-Wildungen (1558–1599)							

== Sources ==
- Behr, Kamill (1854). Genealogie der in Europa regierenden Fürstenhäuser (in German). Leipzig: Verlag von Bernhard Tauchnitz.
- Dek, A.W.E. (1962). Graf Johann der Mittlere von Nassau-Siegen und seine 25 Kinder (in German). Rijswijk: Krips Repro.
- Dek, A.W.E. (1968). "De afstammelingen van Juliana van Stolberg tot aan het jaar van de Vrede van Münster". Spiegel der Historie. Maandblad voor de geschiedenis der Nederlanden (in Dutch). 1968 (7/8): 228–303.
- Dek, A.W.E. (1970). Genealogie van het Vorstenhuis Nassau (in Dutch). Zaltbommel: Europese Bibliotheek.
- von Ehrenkrook, Hans Friedrich; Förster, Karl & Marchtaler, Kurt Erhard (1928). Ahnenreihen aus allen deutschen Gauen. Beilage zum Archiv für Sippenforschung und allen verwandten Gebieten (in German). Görlitz: Verlag für Sippenforschung und Wappenkunde C.A. Starke.
- Hoffmeister, Jacob Christoph Carl (1883). Historisch-genealogisches Handbuch über alle Grafen und Fürsten von Waldeck und Pyrmont seit 1228 (in German). Cassel: Verlag Gustav Klaunig.
- Huberty, Michel; Giraud, Alain & Magdelaine, F. & B. (1981). l'Allemagne Dynastique (in French). Vol. Tome III: Brunswick-Nassau-Schwarzbourg. Le Perreux: Alain Giraud.
- Huberty, Michel; Giraud, Alain & Magdelaine, F. & B. (1987). l'Allemagne Dynastique (in French). Vol. Tome V: Hohenzollern-Waldeck-Familles alliées A-B. Le Perreux-sur-Marne: Alain Giraud.
- Lück, Alfred (1981) [1967]. Siegerland und Nederland (in German) (2nd ed.). Siegen: Siegerländer Heimatverein e.V.
- Menk, Friedhelm (1971). Quellen zur Geschichte des Siegerlandes im niederländischen königlichen Hausarchiv (in German). Siegen: Stadt Siegen/Forschungsstelle Siegerland.
- Graf von Oeynhausen, Julius & Grotefend, H. (1889). Geschichte des Geslechts von Oeynhausen. Aus gedruckten und ungedruckten Quellen (in German). Vol. Dritter Theil: Biographische Bearbeitung. Frankfurt am Main: Wilhelm Rommel.
- Schutte, O. (1979). "Genealogische gegevens". In Tamse, C.A. (ed.). Nassau en Oranje in de Nederlandse geschiedenis (in Dutch). Alphen aan den Rijn: A.W. Sijthoff. pp. 40–44, 224–228. ISBN 90-218-2447-7.
- Textor von Haiger, Johann (1617). Nassauische Chronik (in German). Herborn: Christoph Raab.
- Vorsterman van Oyen, A.A. (1882). Het vorstenhuis Oranje-Nassau. Van de vroegste tijden tot heden (in Dutch). Leiden/Utrecht: A.W. Sijthoff/J.L. Beijers.
