= Magdalene of Waldeck =

German countess (1558–1599)

Magdalene of Waldeck-Wildungen
- Countess of Hanau-Münzenberg; Countess of Nassau-Siegen
- Coat of arms
- Full name: Magdalene Countess of Waldeck-Wildungen
- Native name: Magdalena Gräfin zu Waldeck-Wildungen
- Born: 1558
- Died: 9 September 1599; Idstein Castle
- Buried: 13 September 1599; Fürstengruft, Evangelische Stadtkirche, Dillenburg; Reburied: unknown date St. Nicholas Church, Siegen; Second reburial: 29 April 1690; Fürstengruft, Siegen
- Noble family: House of Waldeck
- Spouses: Philip Louis I of Hanau-Münzenberg; John VII the Middle of Nassau-Siegen
- Issue Detail: Philip Louis II of Hanau-Münzenberg; Juliane of Hanau-Münzenberg; William of Hanau-Münzenberg; Albrecht of Hanau-Schwarzenfels; John Ernest of Nassau-Siegen; John VIII the Younger of Nassau-Siegen; Elisabeth of Nassau-Siegen; Adolf of Nassau-Siegen; Juliane of Nassau-Siegen; Anne Mary of Nassau-Siegen; John Albert of Nassau-Siegen; William of Nassau-Siegen; Anne Joanne of Nassau-Siegen; Frederick Louis of Nassau-Siegen; Magdalene of Nassau-Siegen; John Frederick of Nassau-Siegen
- Father: Philip IV of Waldeck-Wildungen
- Mother: Jutta of Isenburg-Grenzau

Countess Magdalene of Waldeck-Wildungen (1558 – 9 September 1599), German: Magdalena Gräfin zu Waldeck-Wildungen, was a countess from the House of Waldeck and through marriage successively Countess of Hanau-Münzenberg and Countess of Nassau-Siegen.

== Biography ==
Magdalene was born in 1558 as the youngest daughter of Count Philip IV of Waldeck-Wildungen and his third wife Countess Jutta of Isenburg-Grenzau. (Note: Other sources that mention both parents indicate other parents.) The exact date and place of Magdalene's birth are unknown.

Magdalene married at Hanau Castle (Note: Dek (1970), p. 86 states married in Hanau.) on 5 February 1576 (Note: Hoffmeister (1883), p. 27, however, states the date 2 February 1576.) to Count Philip Louis I of Hanau-Münzenberg (21 November 1553 – Hanau, 4 February 1580), the eldest son of Count Philip III of Hanau-Münzenberg and Countess Palatine Helena of Simmern. Philip Louis succeeded his father in 1561 and was first under the regency of his uncle Count John VI the Elder of Nassau-Siegen (Philip III of Hanau-Münzenberg and John VI the Elder of Nassau-Siegen were both sons of Countess Juliane of Stolberg-Wernigerode). Politically, the marriage could represent a conscious withdrawal on her groom's part from the politically dominant influence of his guardian, John VI the Elder of Nassau-Siegen. Philip Louis died "Donnerstag nach Purificationis Mariæ, zwischen 4 und 5 Uhr Nachmittag durch eine Ohnmacht, welche ihre Gnaden ganz unversehentlich über Tisch und dem Spielen ankommen" ("Thursday after Purificationis Mariæ, between 4 and 5 o'clock in the afternoon by a fainting which His Grace completely unexpectedly suffered at the table and at the games").

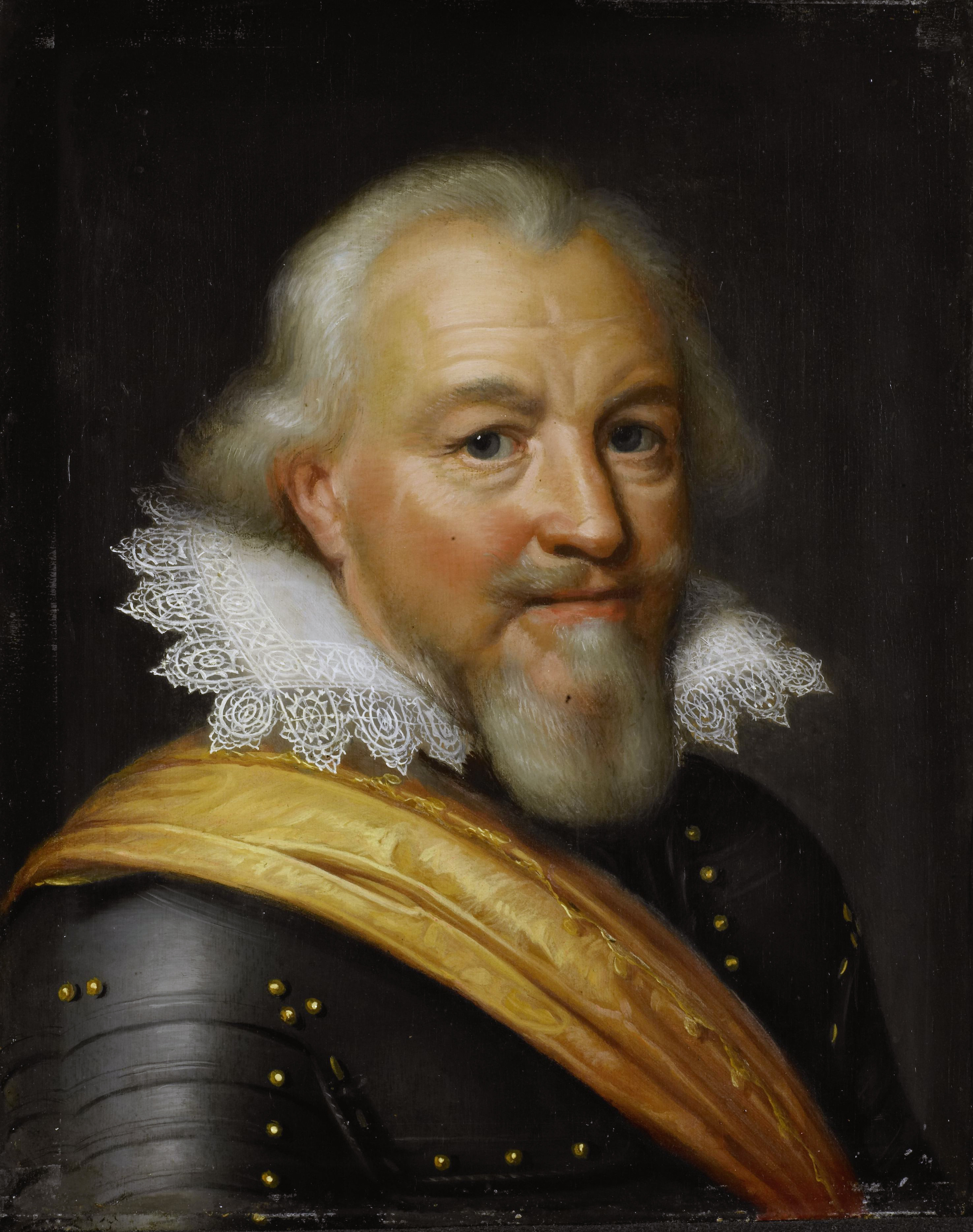
Count John VII the Middle of Nassau-Siegen, Magdalene's second husband. Studio of Jan Antonisz. van Ravesteyn, c. 1610–1620. Rijksmuseum Amsterdam.

Magdalena remarried at Dillenburg Castle (Note: The other sources that mention a place of marriage, state married in Dillenburg.) on 9 December 1581 (Note: All but one of the sources that mention a full date of marriage, state this date. Hoffmeister (1883), p. 27, however, states the date 24 November 1581.) to Count John VII the Middle of Nassau-Siegen (Siegen Castle, (Note: Glawischnig (1974) states that he was born in Siegen. All older sources that mention a place of birth, state that he was born in Dillenburg.) 7 June 1561 – Siegen Castle, (Note: The other sources that mention a place of death, state that he died in Siegen.) 27 September 1623 (Note: All but one of the sources that mention a complete date of death, state this date. Only Glawischnig (1974) states the date 7 October 1623. It is not clear whether the author meant to convert the date mentioned by the other sources to the Gregorian calendar, nor whether the date mentioned by the other sources is according to the Julian calendar.)), the second son of Count John VI the Elder of Nassau-Siegen and his first wife Landgravine Elisabeth of Leuchtenberg. Through his marriage to Magdalene, John the Middle strengthened relations within the Wetterauer Grafenverein and thus contributed to the strengthening of the House of Nassau. John the Middle was a cousin of Magdalena's first husband. Magdalena's great-grandmother Countess Joanne of Nassau-Siegen, was an older sister of Count John V of Nassau-Siegen, the great-grandfather of John the Middle. Magdalene's great-great-grandmother Countess Jutta of Eppstein-Münzenberg was a granddaughter of Count Adolf I of Nassau-Siegen, the elder brother of Count Engelbert I of Nassau-Siegen, the grandfather of Count John V.

Magdalene died at Idstein Castle (Note: The other sources do not mention a place of death.) on 9 September 1599, where she stayed for the funeral of her nephew Count John Philip of Nassau-Idstein. (Note: John Philip of Nassau-Idstein was the eldest son of Mary of Nassau-Siegen, a younger sister of John the Middle.) She was buried in the Fürstengruft in the Evangelische Stadtkirche in Dillenburg on 13 September 1599. Bernhard Textor wrote a Leichenpredigt for Magdalene which was published in Herborn in 1600.

John the Middle remarried at Rotenburg Castle (Note: Glawischnig (1974) states married in Rotenburg/Fulda. Textor von Haiger (1617), p. 153 states married in Rotenburg in Hessen and specifies that this was the Beilager and that the Heimführung took place on 3 September 1603 in Dillenburg.) on 27 August 1603 (Note: All but one of the sources that mention a full date of marriage, state this date. Only Glawischnig (1974) mentions the date 6 September 1603. It is not clear whether the author intended to convert the date mentioned by the other sources to the Gregorian calendar, or whether the date mentioned by the other sources is according to the Julian calendar.) to Duchess Margaret of Schleswig-Holstein-Sonderburg (Haus Sandberg am Alsensund near Sonderburg, 24 February 1583 – Nassauischer Hof, Siegen, 10/20 April 1658 (Note: The other sources that mention the place and date of death, state that she died in Siegen on 10 April 1658.)), the youngest daughter of Duke John II the Younger of Schleswig-Holstein-Sonderburg and his first wife Duchess Elisabeth of Brunswick-Grubenhagen.

When his father died on 8 October 1606, John the Middle succeeded his father together with his brothers William Louis, George, Ernest Casimir and John Louis. On 30 March 1607 the brothers divided their possessions. John acquired Siegen, Freudenberg, Netphen, Hilchenbach, Ferndorf and the Haingericht.

John the Middle died aged 62 and was buried in the St. Nicholas Church in Siegen on 5/15 November 1623. There he had planned the construction of a dignified burial vault for the dynasty he founded. For this, there are remarkable notes in Latin, partly in elegiac couplets, for a projected memorial and burial place of the sovereign family, from the time around 1620, with the names of all 25 children from his two marriages, also with details of birth, marriage and death of his relatives. Since the project was not carried out, the burials of the members of the sovereign family between 1607 and 1658 took place in the inadequate burial vault under the choir of the mentioned parish church. At a time hitherto unknown, Magdalene was interred there with her husband John the Middle. On 29 April 1690 (Note: Lück & Wunderlich (1956), p. 27 however, state the date 26 April 1690.) Magdalene and John were transferred to the Fürstengruft in Siegen.

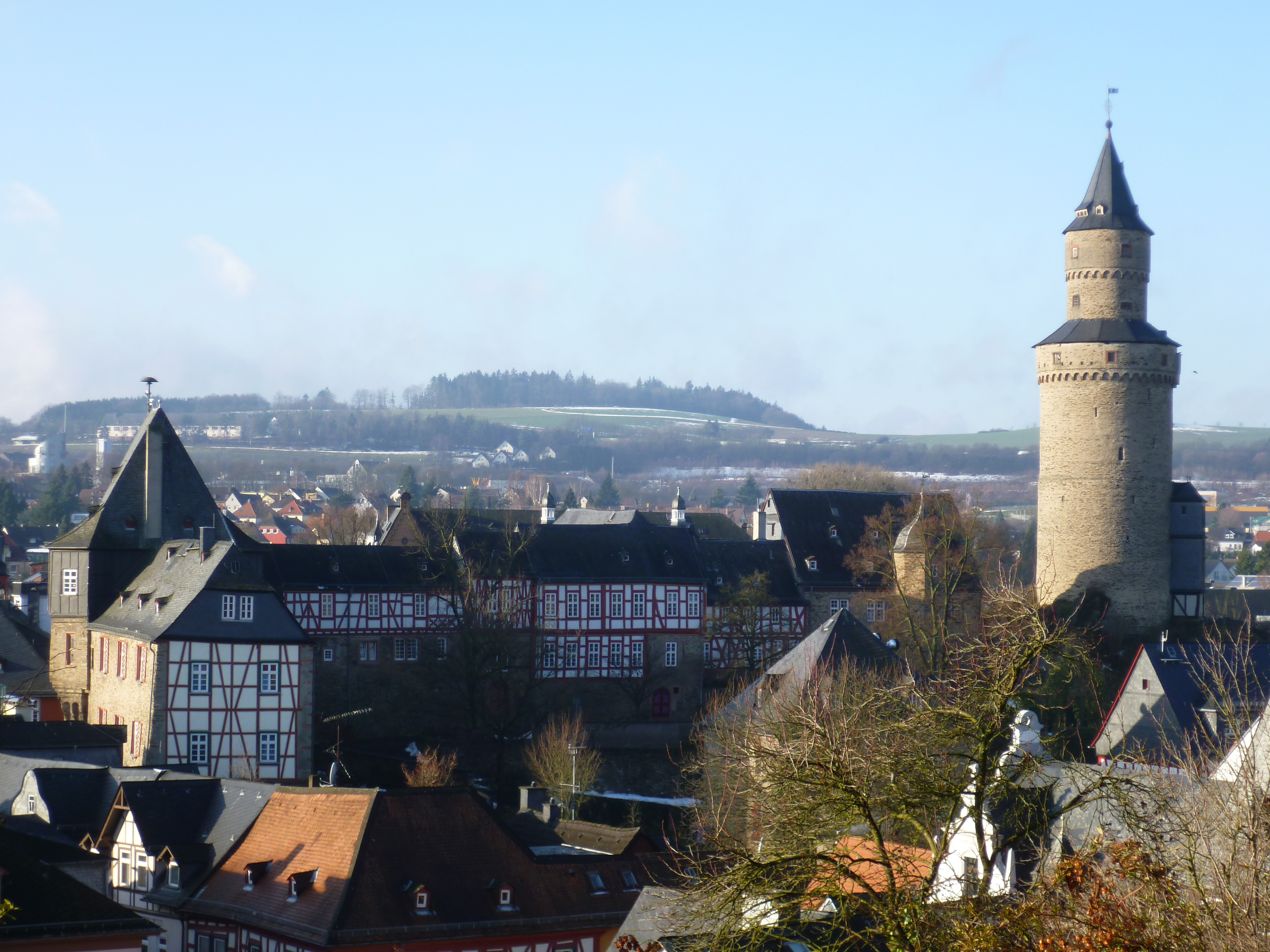
Idstein Castle. Photo: Frank Winkelmann, 2011.

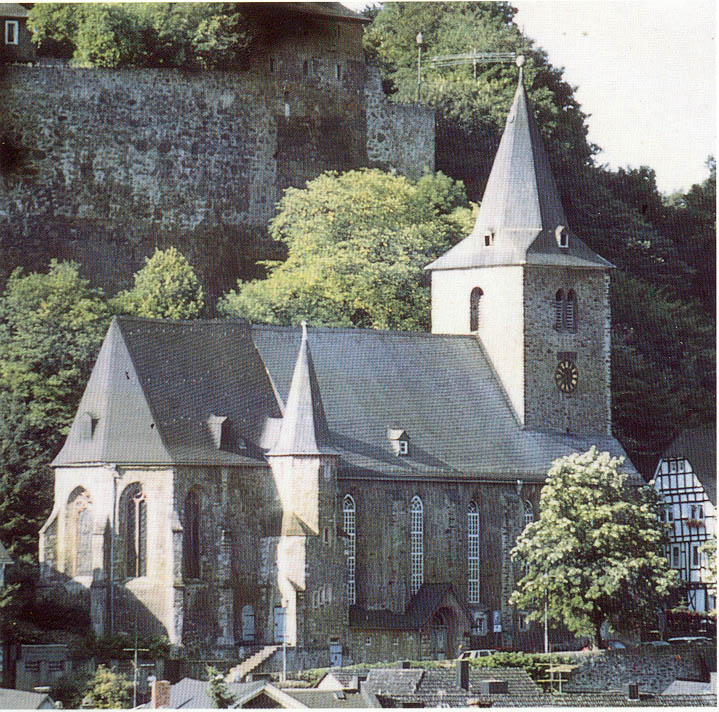
The Evangelische Stadtkirche in Dillenburg, 2014.

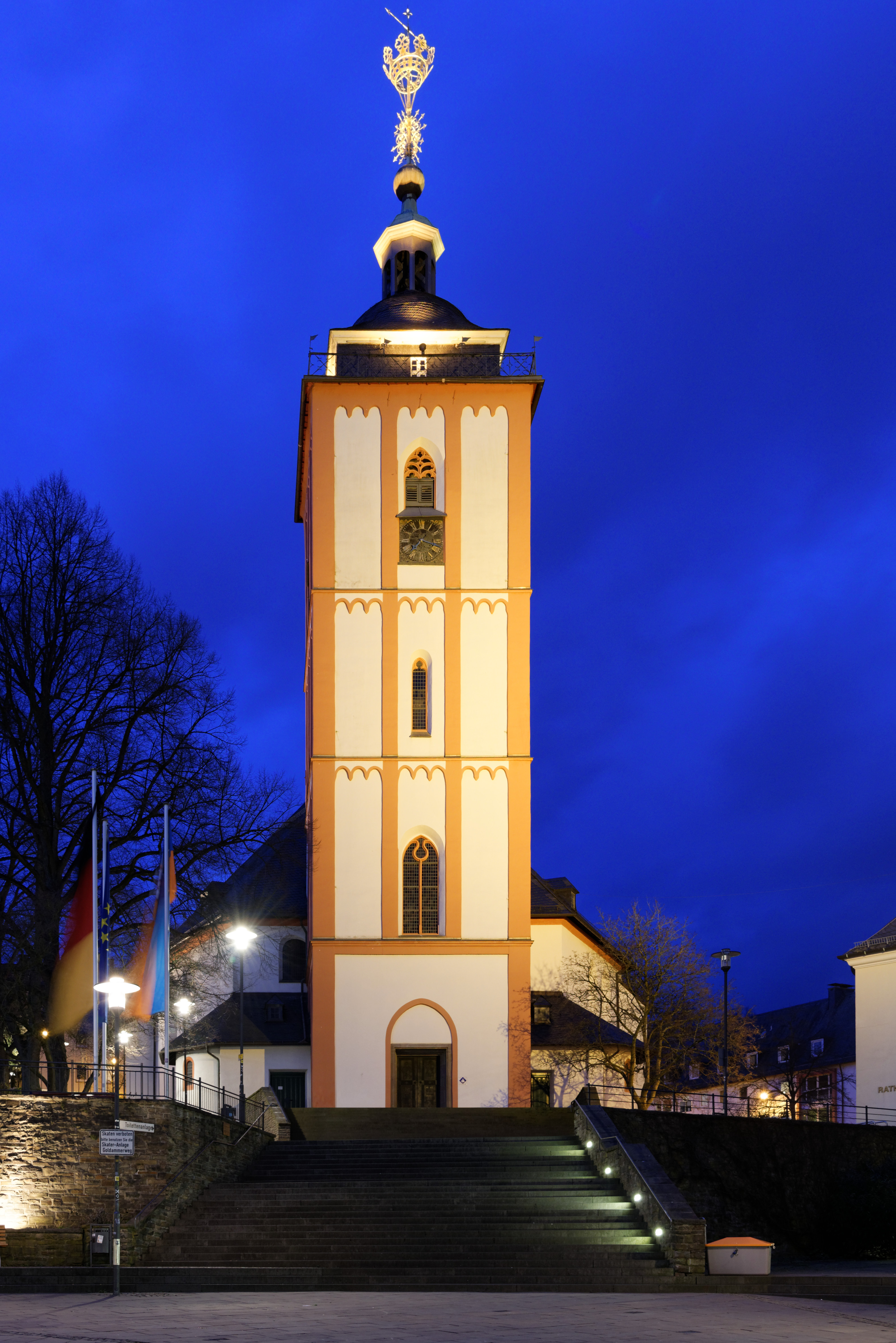
The St. Nicholas Church in Siegen. Photo: Matthias Böhm, 2016.

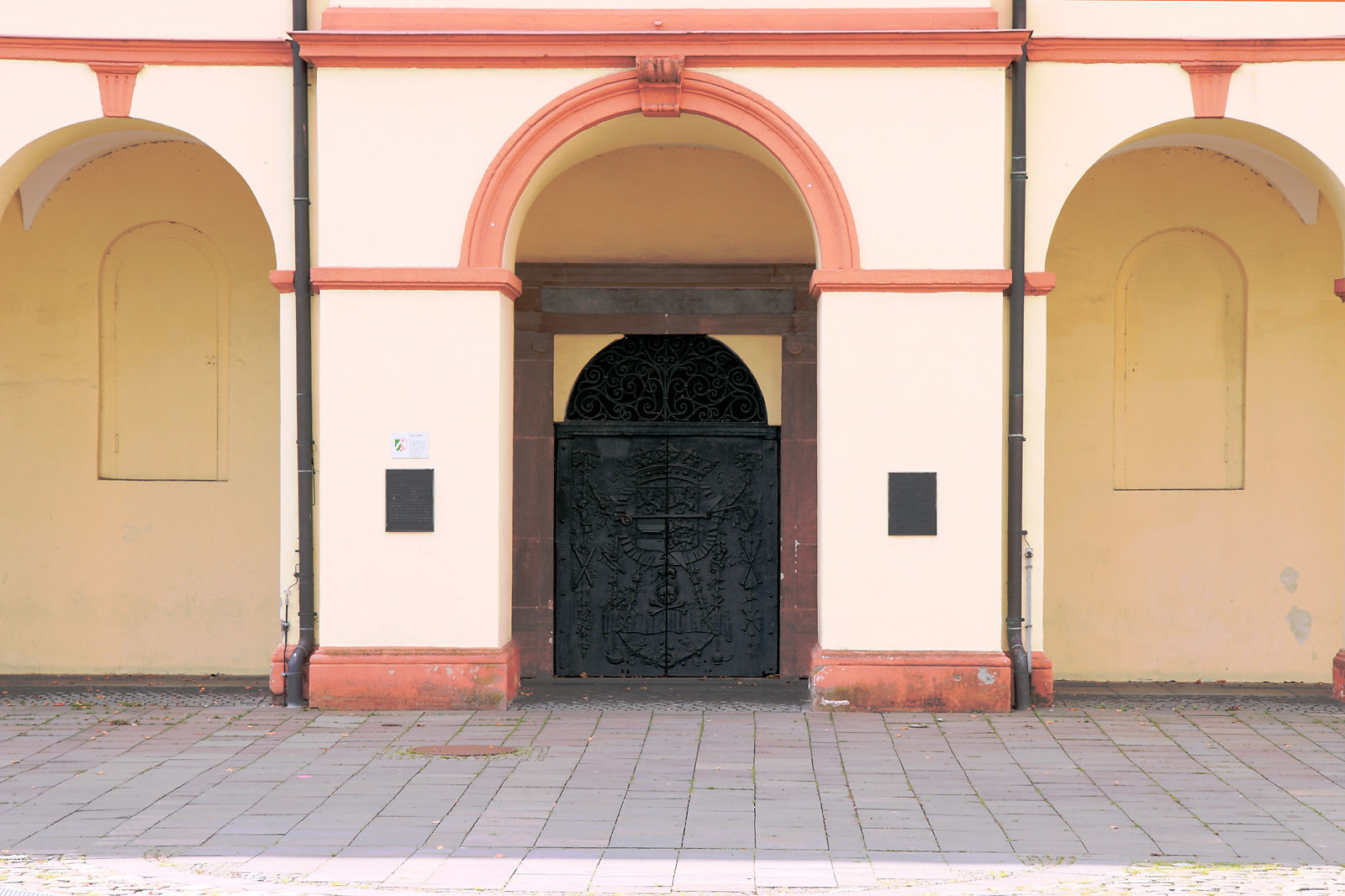
The entrance to the Fürstengruft in Siegen. Photo: Bob Ionescu, 2009.

== Issue ==
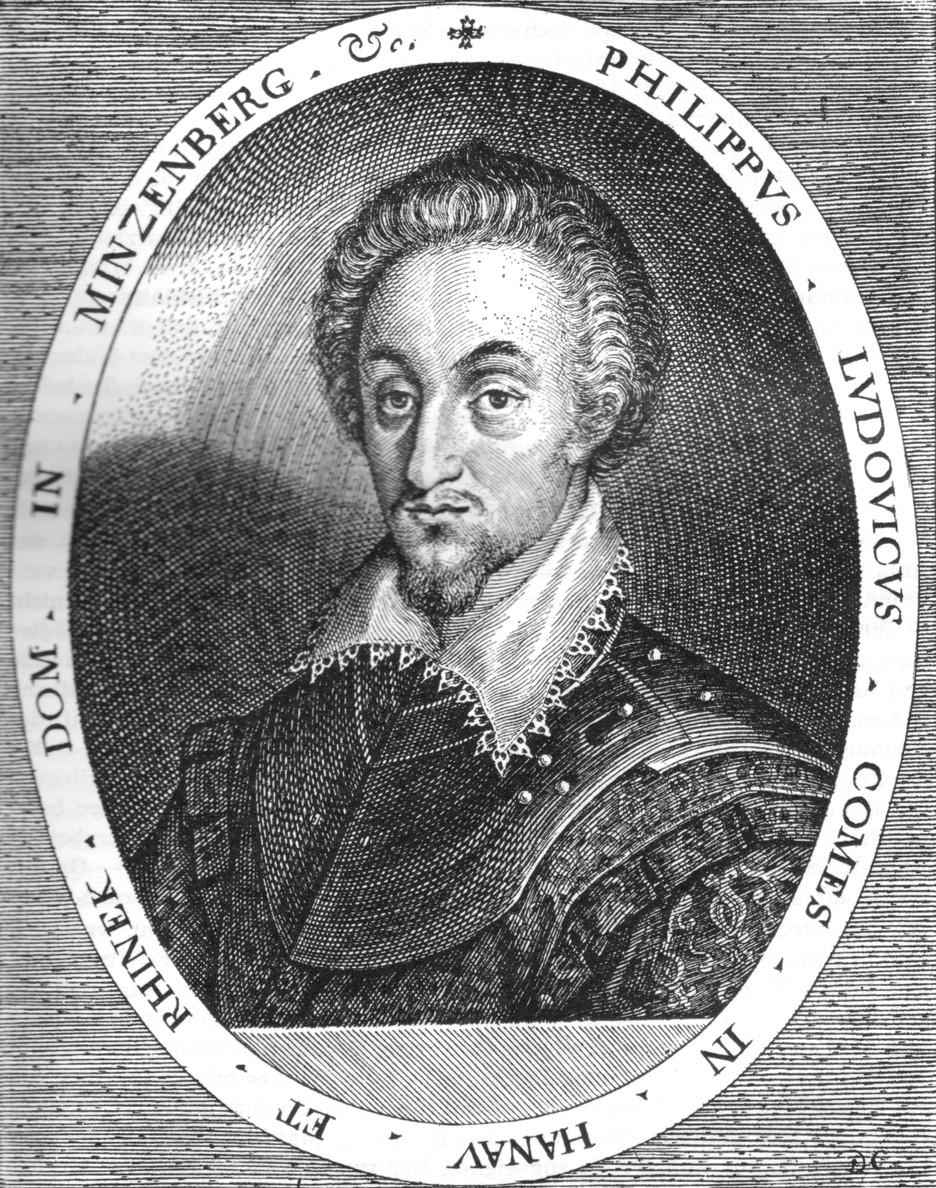
Count Philip Louis II of Hanau-Münzenberg (1576–1612). Copper engraving by Dominicus Custos. Historisches Museum, Hanau.

=== First marriage ===
Magdalene was constantly pregnant during her first marriage with Philip Louis I of Hanau-Münzenberg, giving birth to four children in just four years, although only two of them survived infancy:

1. Count Philip Louis II (Hanau, 18 November 1576 – Hanau, 19 August 1612), succeeded his father as Count of Hanau-Münzenberg in 1580. Married in Dillenburg on 23 October/2 November 1596 to Countess Catherine Belgica of Nassau (Antwerp, 31 July 1578 – The Hague, 12/22 April 1648), daughter of Prince William I the Silent of Orange and Duchess Charlotte of Bourbon-Montpensier.
2. Juliane (13 October 1577 – 2 December 1577), buried in the choir of the Saint Mary's Church in Hanau.
3. William (26 August 1578 – 4 June 1579), also buried in the choir of St. Mary's Church in Hanau.
4. Count Albrecht (12 November 1579 – Strasbourg, 19 December 1635), succeeded his father as Count of Hanau-Schwarzenfels in 1580. Married on 16 August 1604 to Countess Ehrengard of Isenburg-Birstein (1 October 1577 – Frankfurt, 21 September 1637).

=== Second marriage ===
From the marriage of Magdalene was also frequently pregnant during her second marriage with John VII the Middle of Nassau-Siegen, giving birth to 12 more children in just 15 years:

1. John Ernest (Siegen Castle, 21 October 1582^{Jul.} (Note: "Dek (1962) and Dek (1968) write that he was born at Dillenburg Castle, but Dek (1970) corrects this and gives Siegen as place of birth, which is confirmed by Menk (1971), p. 18. Dek (1962) indicates as date of birth Sunday 21-10-1582, which corresponds with the Julian calendar.") – Udine, 16/17 September 1617^{Jul.} (Note: "Dek (1962) indicates Udine as the place of death. See the file in the Royal House Archive of the Netherlands (4/135), entitled: «Ableben von Johann Ernst, Erbgraf zu Nassau-Siegen den 17 September stil veteri (1617) in Mitternacht zu Udine». The death announcement contained therein, as well as other announcements found in the State Archives Wiesbaden (170^{III} 1617 Sep. Dez.) or in the State Archives Marburg (File 115, Waldeck 2, Nassau 339), were all sent from Udine by the brother of the deceased on 27-9 (i.e. new style), and indicate that the death, after an illness of three or four weeks, occurred, either «heute diese Nacht umb 12 Uhr», or «le 26, environ à minuit». All this information is consistent, and we can be sure that the count died during the siege of Udine, in the night of 16 to 17-9-1617 old style. See also a document concerning his death, on the occasion of his burial on 19-4-1618 in Siegen (Royal House Archive of the Netherlands 3/1072): «27 Septembris, Anno 1617 ohngefehr umb Mitternacht … zu Udina».")), was, among other things, a general in the Venetian army, involved in the Uskok War.
2. Count John VIII the Younger (Dillenburg Castle, 29 September 1583^{Jul.} (Note: "Place of birth mentioned in Dek (1962), Dek (1968), Dek (1970) and in his biography (Royal House Archive of the Netherlands IV, 1638). Dek (1962) says he was born on Sunday 29-9-1583, so old style.") – Ronse Castle near Oudenaarde, 27 July 1638 (Note: "In Genealogisches Handbuch des Adels XXXIII, 51 it is erroneously stated that he died in Roubaix, Flanders. He died in 1638 on his estate in Ronse, near Oudenaarde in East Flanders (see De Clercq (1962), p. 132, which gives many details about his death and burial). Ronse Castle then passed to the Merode Family, and was sold and demolished in 1823 (see De Ligne (1936), p. 26). The date of death mentioned by all authors, 27-7-1638, is the one that appears in the notifications sent from Ronse, where the new calendar was in force. So it is most likely 27-7, new style.")), succeeded his father as Count of Nassau-Siegen in 1623. Married in Brussels on 13 August 1618 to Princess Ernestine Yolande de Ligne (2 November 1594 – Brussels, 4 January 1663).
3. Elisabeth (Dillenburg Castle, 8 November 1584 – Landau, 26 July 1661), married in Wildungen in November 1604 (Note: "Wildungen 19-11-1604 in Dek (1962) (date confirmed in Europäische Stammtafeln I, 117). Wildungen 29-11-1604 (new style?) in von Ehrenkrook, et al. (1928) I, 195 and 409. Europäische Stammtafeln I, 139 on the other hand places the marriage on 18-11-1604, which is the date Hoffmeister (1883) states. However, an original copy of the latter work with handwritten notes by various archivists, which is in the State Archives Marburg, states that the following inscription about Elisabeth is on the baptismal font at Arolsen: «dicta Ao 1604 19 Novemb. et Nuptiae Wildungen celebratae».") to Count Christian of Waldeck-Wildungen (Eisenberg Castle, 24/25 December 1585 – Waldeck Castle, 31 December 1637).
4. Adolf (Dillenburg Castle, 8 August 1586 – Xanten, 7 November 1608), was a captain in the Dutch States Army.
5. Juliane (Dillenburg Castle, 3 September 1587 (Note: "Birthplace in Dek (1962), with the date 3-9 also found in Europäische Stammtafeln I, 98, while Europäische Stammtafeln I, 117 states 8-9. We have chosen the first of these two dates because the Personalia in the funeral sermon (quoted by Knetsch (1931)) says that she was born at Dillenburg Castle on 3 September 1587 «abends zwischen 7 und 8 Uhr».") – Eschwege, 15 February 1643 (Note: "See Dek (1962) and Knetsch (1931). The latter mentions as sources: a) Schminke, Geschichte von Eschwege, 1857, p. 14; b) «Personalia» in the funeral sermon: «abends zwischen 5 und 6 Uhr»; c) Notification of Landgravine Amelia Elisabeth, Kassel 16‑2‑1643; d) Notification of Landgrave Herman of Hesse-Rotenburg (Dresden Archive N. 8658).")), married at Dillenburg Castle on 21 May 1603^{Jul.} (Note: "On 21‑5‑1603, in Europäische Stammtafeln I, 117. On 22‑5‑1603 in Europäische Stammtafeln I, 98 and in Dek (1962) and Dek (1970) (place of marriage: Dillenburg). Knetsch (1931) also indicates Dillenburg 22-5 (according to the Annals of the University of Marburg). According to this author (who refers to the Hessian matrimonial affairs) was it the marriage contract (pactum dotale) that was signed on 21-5; but he adds that the «présent du lendemain» (Morgengabeverschreibung) was signed on the 22nd. This information confirms that the marriage was celebrated religiously on the 21st (and was consummated on the night of the 21st to the 22nd): as we find in the State Archives Wiesbaden (130^{II} 2380^{II} d) a letter of invitation sent from Dillenburg on 11-5-1603 in which the Count of Nassau-Ottweiler was asked to arrive in Dillenburg on the 18th to attend the wedding «zur Vollziehung des ehelichen BEYLAGERS auff Sambstag den 21 hujus alhier». So there is no doubt that the date of the religious ceremony is Saturday 21-5-1603 (thus old style).") (Beilager) and in Kassel on 4 June 1603^{Jul.} (Heimführung) to Landgrave Maurice of Hesse-Kassel (Kassel, 25 May 1572 – Eschwege, 15 March 1632).
6. Anne Mary (Dillenburg Castle, 3 March 1589 – 22 February 1620), married in Dillenburg on 3 February 1611^{Jul.} (Note: "The marriage took place in Dillenburg according to Dek (1962) and Dek (1970), who place the ceremony on 2-6-1611 (2-2 in Europäische Stammtafeln I, 117 and IV, 137). See in the Royal House Archive of the Netherlands (4/134) an invitation «uff Sambstagk den 2 Tagk künftigen Monats Februari … gegen Abend zeitlich einkommen und Sontags der christliche Kirchgang und Hochzeitlich Ehrentagk gehalten werden soll». So there is no doubt about the date 3-2, old style.") to Count John Adolf of Daun-Falkenstein-Broich (c. 1581 – 13 March 1653), Count of Falkenstein and Broich.
7. John Albert (Dillenburg, 8 February 1590 (Note: "Dek (1962) and Dek (1970) say that he was born in Dillenburg on 9-2-1590. The place of birth indeed seems obvious, as the baptism took place in Dillenburg (see Royal House Archive of the Netherlands 3/1047) on 22 February. In fact, the date of birth was not the 9th but the 8th. In the Royal House Archive of the Netherlands (4/1331 II) we find documents concerning the inheritance of the first wife of John the Middle, born Countess of Waldeck: there is mention of the first of the brothers, who died in 1590 «der erste mit Todt abgegangen Anno 1590 … Herrchen Hanns Albrecht … geboren den 8 Februar 1590, auch in demselben Jahr wieder mit Todt abgangen». In the same file there is a correspondence between John the Middle and his daughter Elisabeth. In the letter of 25-2-1619 the count mentions John Albert, his son, who was born in 1590 and died in the same year.") – Dillenburg, 1590).
8. Count William (Dillenburg, 13 August 1592 (Note: "Europäische Stammtafeln says he was born on 12-8-1592, a date confirmed by Dek (1970), with mention of the place of birth. But a notification from the father sent from Siegen of 24 August 1592 (see State Archives Wiesbaden 170^{III}, Korrespondenzen) indicates the date «13 hujus».") – Orsoy, 7/17 July 1642 (Note: "See Menk (1967), p. 57. The author establishes that the death took place in Orsoy (Lower Rhine) on Thursday 7/17 July 1642, between one and two o'clock in the afternoon, and bases himself on the documents found in the Royal House Archive of the Netherlands (IV, 1444): a notification addressed to the widow from Orsoy on 7/17 July 1642 («heute den 7/17 disses …») and an death announcement from a priest from Kampen («Donnerstag, den 7/17 juli 1642 zwischen 1 u. 2 Uhr nachmittags zu Orsoy …»).")), was since 1624 count in a part of Nassau-Siegen and since 1633 field marshal of the Dutch States army. Married at Siegen Castle on 17 January 1619 (Note: "The marriage is said to have taken place on 20-8-1616, according to Europäische Stammtafeln. Dek (1970) is closer to the truth when he puts forward the date of 16-1-1619 (without place). It is in fact on 17-1-1619 that the ceremony on the occasion of the baptism of John Ernest was celebrated, which had taken place on 10-1, old style, in Siegen (see State Archives Wiesbaden 170^{III}: Count Ernst Casimir of Nassau-Diez answers to his brother John the Middle of Nassau-Siegen about the marriage that followed the recent baptism in Siegen «auf nächstabgewichener Kindstauf zu Siegen mit dem Fraulein zu Erbach sein hochzeitliches Beilager gehalten»). See also Royal House Archive of the Netherlands (4/1591 II): John the Middle writes on 2‑1‑1619 in Siegen to his daughter Juliane with the request to arrive on the evening of the 16th to attend William's wedding on the 17th. On 3-1-1619, William personally requests the Landgrave of Hesse-Kassel to arrive on the 16th in the evening to attend his wedding that would take place «den 17 dieses allhier». It is the marriage contract that was signed on the 16th, in Siegen.") to Countess Christiane of Erbach (5 juni 1596 – Culemborg, 6 juli 1646 (Note: "See Dek (1962). On the other hand, her daughter Mary Magdalene reports from Culemborg on 9-7-1646 that the death took place «auf den 1 huius des Vormittags um zehn Uhr».")).
9. Anne Joanne (Note: The given name Anne in Huberty, et al. (1981), p. 234. The given name Anna in Romein (1937), pp. 125–126, Van der Aa (1855), p. 1267 and Textor von Haiger (1617), p. 172.) (Dillenburg Castle, 2 March 1594^{Jul.} (Note: "She was baptised in Siegen on Sunday 17-3-1594 (see State Archives Wiesbaden 170^{III}), letter from Count Wolfgang Ernst I of Ysenburg-Büdingen. Another notification preserved in the archives of the princes of Isenburg-Büdingen-Birstein at Büdingen Castle clearly shows that the date 23-2-1594, indicated by Dek (1962) and all printed genealogies, is incorrect. The letter, dated Dillenburg 3 März 1594, states that Anne was born «verschiedenen Tag … und Sonntag Judicae den 17ten Marty … getauft». The reference to Sunday 17 March clearly indicates that the writer of the letter used the old style and that, when he speaks of a birth that took place the day before, this can only be a birth that took place on 2 March, old style. The mistake may be due to the fact that in Holland (where the countess later lived) the new style was in use. Probably, it was believed that her date of birth was calculated according to the new calendar and German authors converted it to the old calendar, which is indeed the incorrect date of 23 February.") – The Hague, December 1636 (Note: "The place of death in Dek (1970), with the date 7-12-1636 (as in Europäische Stammtafeln). However, a serious reservation must be made with this information, since the bell in the Great Church or St. James' Church in The Hague was not rung for her until 23 December 1636. See the register of fees received for opening graves or ringing the bell (church registers inv. n2. 68, f. 16v.). This information was obtained from the Municipal Archives in The Hague, according to whom no actual death certificates existed at the time.")), married at Broich Castle near Mülheim an der Ruhr on 19 June 1619 (Note: "According to Dek (1970) and Europäische Stammtafeln, the marriage took place on 14-6, but in the State Archives Wiesbaden 170^{III} we find a letter from Jakob Schickhard, addressed to John the Middle, Count of Nassau-Siegen, which recounts in full detail the ceremony celebrated in Broich on 19-6 and then the couple's departure for Vianen. This letter is dated Siegen 30 June 1619. See also Royal House Archive of the Netherlands IV/1345. The contract was signed in Siegen on 18-3-1619 (Royal House Archive of the Netherlands 4/1346 I).") to Johan Wolfert van Brederode (Heusden (?), 12 June 1599 – Petersheim Castle near Maastricht, 3 September 1655), Lord of Brederode, Vianen, Ameide and Cloetingen.
10. Frederick Louis (2 February 1595 – Dillenburg, 22 April 1600^{Jul.} (Note: "See State Archives Wiesbaden (170^{III}). John the Middle writes on 23-4-1600 from Dillenburg to his son Adolf to inform him of the death of his younger brother, Frederick Louis «den 22. dieses, am Abend ungefähr um acht Uhr». He announces the funeral for the next day, Thursday, which proves that the date of death is calculated according to the old style.")).
11. Magdalene (23 February 1596 – 6 December 1662 (Note: "The date of death given by Europäische Stammtafeln seems very plausible. On the other hand, we cannot accept the indication by Dek (1970) that the countess died in Bremen on 31-7-1661. We found a copy of the will with codicil in the State Archives Marburg (115, Waldeck 2, Nassau 343). The countess testified in Verden on 4-4-1658 and on 29-11-1662. There is therefore every reason to assume that she died in that town.")), married:
  1. in August 1631 to Bernhard Moritz Freiherr von Oeynhausen-Velmede (1602 – Leipzig, 20 November 1632);
  2. on 25 August 1642 Philipp Wilhelm Freiherr von Innhausen und Knyphausen (20 March 1591 – Bremen, 5 May 1652).
12. John Frederick (10 February 1597 (Note: "See Textor von Haiger (1617). The author writes that John Frederick was born on 10-2, between eleven and twelve o'clock in the evening.") – 1597 (Note: "See Textor von Haiger (1617): «ist von dieser Welt im selbigen Jahr wiederumb abgeschieden und in die Pfarrkirche zu Dillenburg begraben». So there is every reason to assume that birth and death took place in Dillenburg, which was also the family's residence at that time. Dek (1970) situates the death in 1598.")).
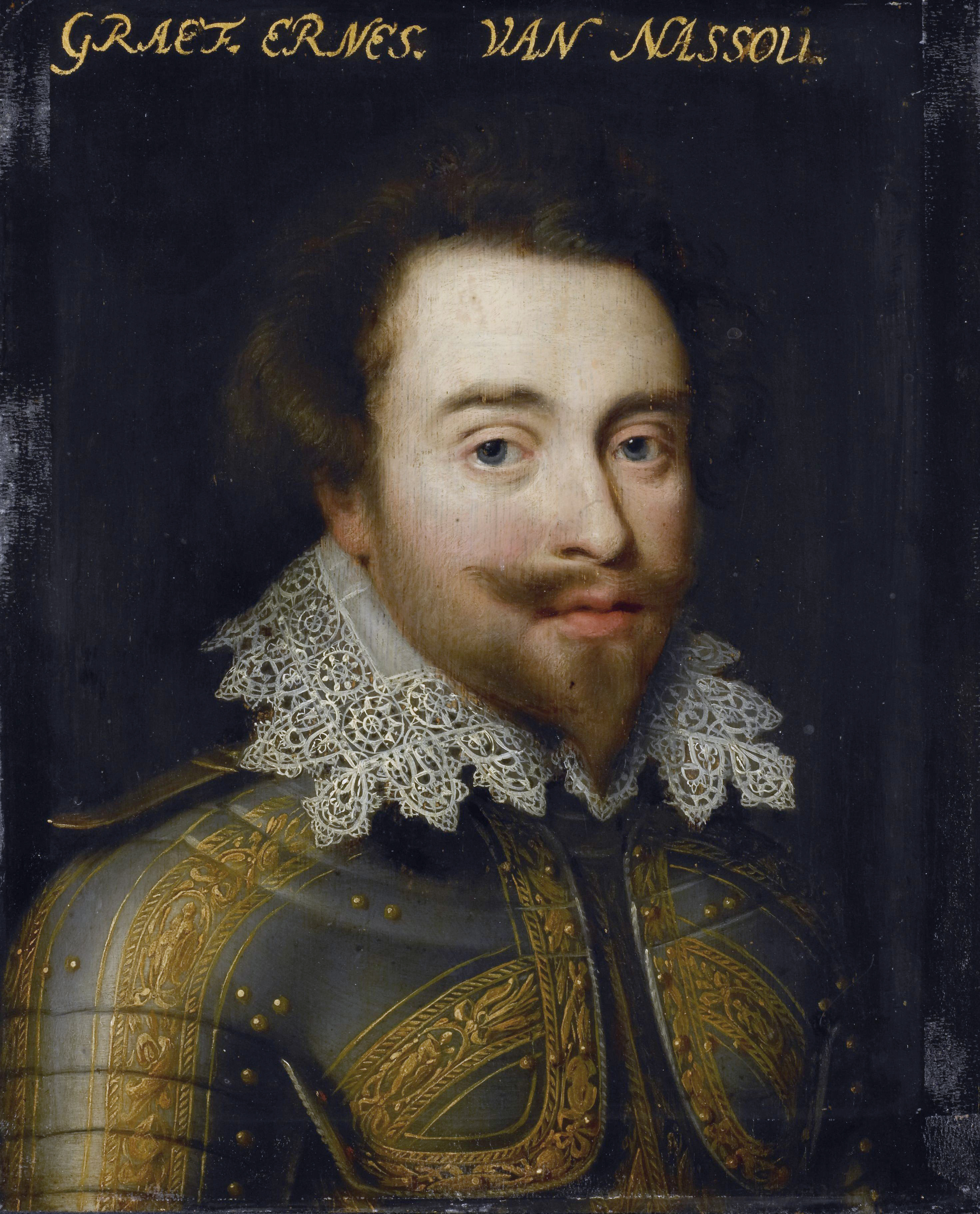
John Ernest of Nassau-Siegen (1582–1617). Studio of Jan Antonisz. van Ravesteyn, c. 1609–1633. Rijksmuseum Amsterdam.

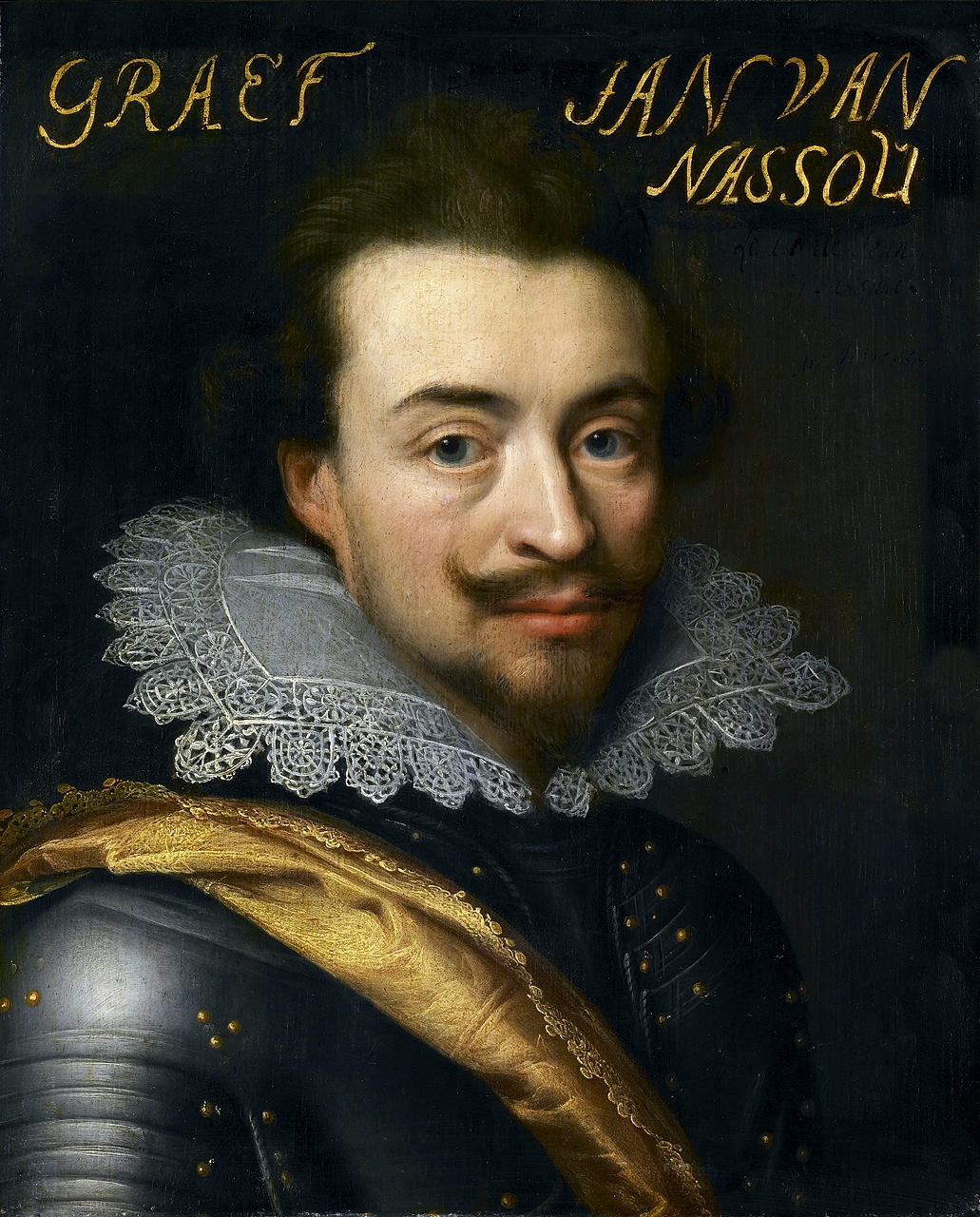
Count John VIII the Younger of Nassau-Siegen (1583–1638). Studio of Jan Antonisz. van Ravesteyn, c. 1614–1633. Rijksmuseum Amsterdam.

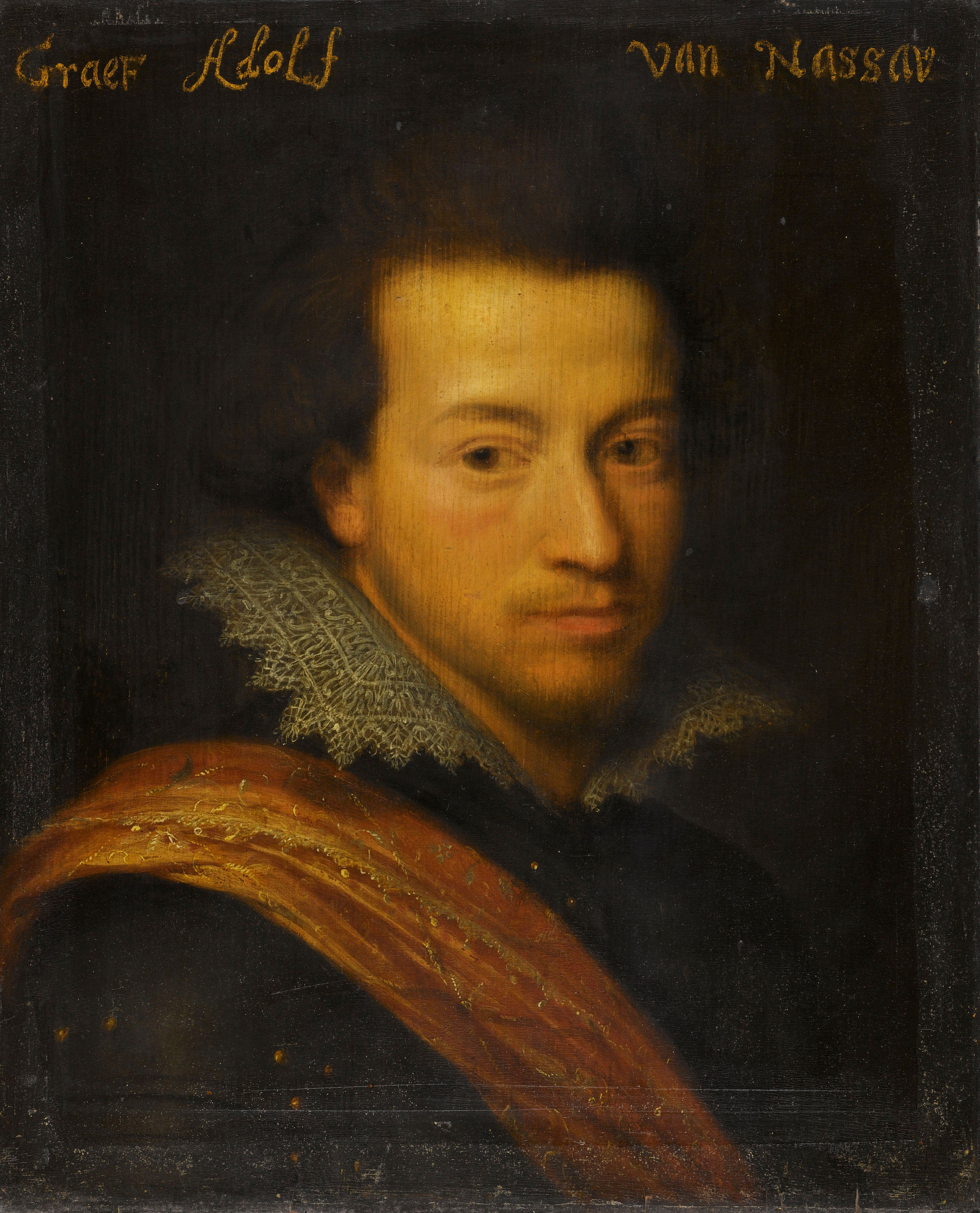
Adolf of Nassau-Siegen (1586–1608). Attributed to Jan Antonisz. van Ravesteyn, c. 1609–1633. Rijksmuseum Amsterdam.

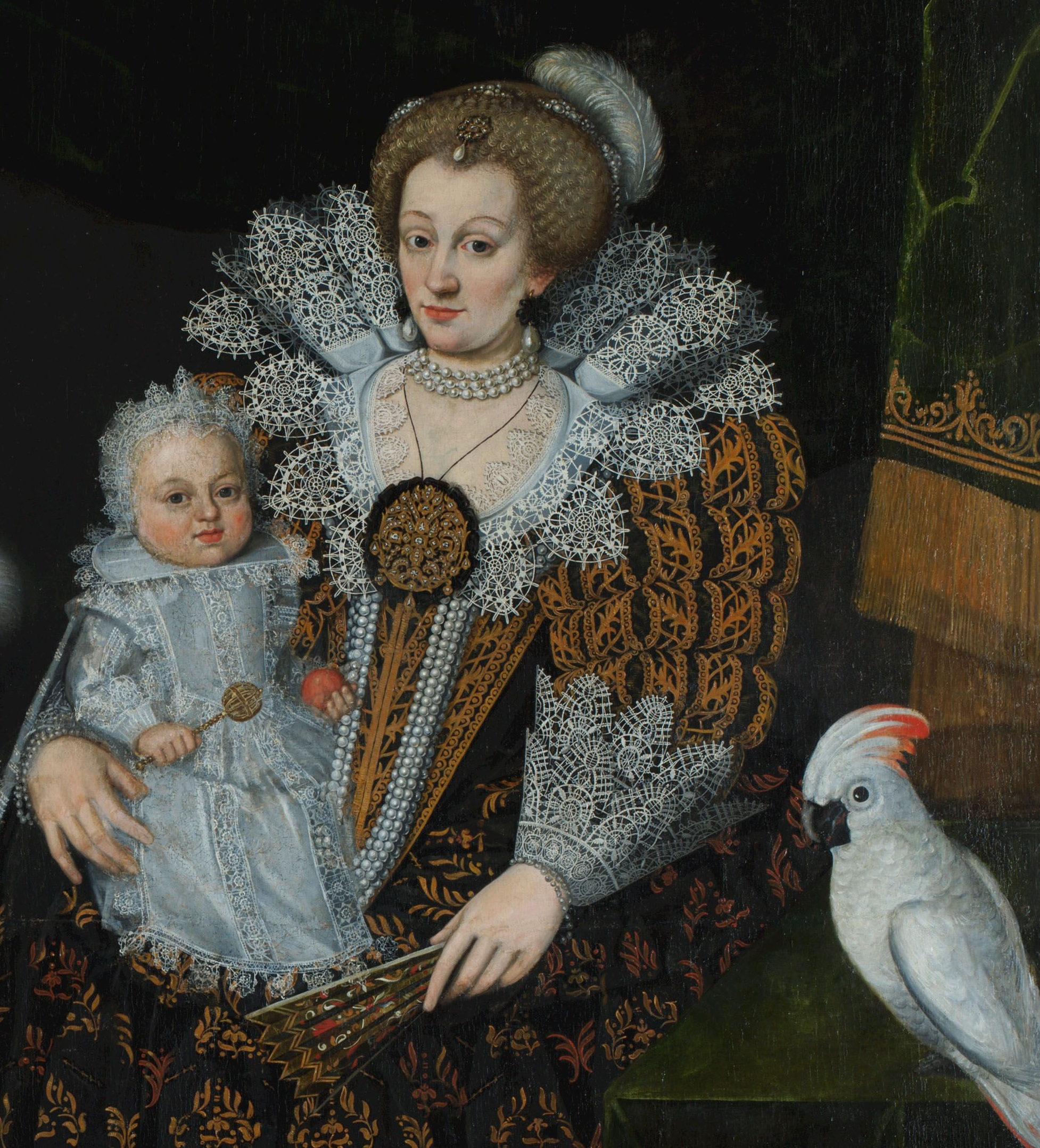
Juliane of Nassau-Siegen (1587–1643). Detail of a painting by August Erich, 1618–1628. Gemäldegalerie Alte Meister, Museumslandschaft Hessen Kassel.

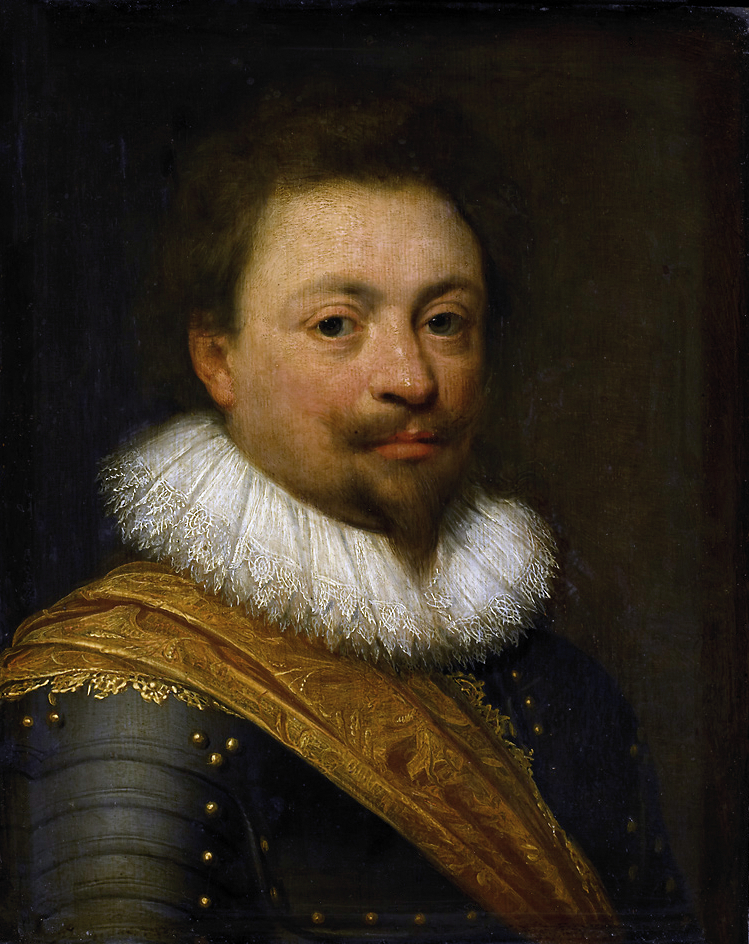
Count William of Nassau-Siegen (1592–1642). Studio of Jan Antonisz. van Ravesteyn, c. 1620–1630. Rijksmuseum Amsterdam.

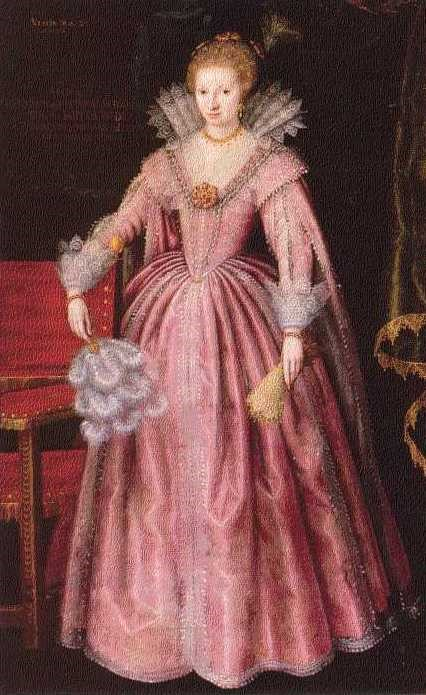
Anne Joanne of Nassau-Siegen (1594–1636). Anonymous portrait, 1620. Braunfels Castle.

=== Known descendants ===
Magdalene has many known descendants. All reigning European monarchs, with the exception of the Fürst of Liechtenstein, are descendants of her, and also the heads of the no longer reigning royal houses of Baden, Greece, Lippe, Prussia, Romania and Waldeck and Pyrmont. Other known descendants are:

- the Prussian Field Marshal Fürst Leopold I of Anhalt-Dessau (der Alte Dessauer),
- the French Field Marshal Maurice of Saxony,
- the Austrian chancellor Klemens von Metternich,
- the Romanian writer Carmen Sylva,
- the Norwegian explorer Fridtjof Nansen,
- the German chancellor Max von Baden, and
- the German fighter pilot from World War I Manfred von Richthofen (The Red Baron).

== Ancestors ==
Ancestors of Magdalene of Waldeck-Wildungen
Great-great-grandparents	Wolrad I of Waldeck-Waldeck (c. 1399–1475) ⚭ before 1440; Barbara of Wertheim (1420/22–after 1443)	John IV of Nassau-Siegen (1410–1475) ⚭ 1440; Mary of Looz-Heinsberg (1424–1502)	Thierry IV of Runkel (d. 1462) ⚭ Anastasia of Isenburg-Wied (d. 1429)	John VII of Rollingen (d. 1457) ⚭ c. 1437; Margaret of Sierck (d. 1496)	Gerlach I of Isenburg-Grenzau (d. 1485) ⚭ 1425; Jutta of Eppstein-Münzenberg (d. 1455)	Arnold VII of Sierck (d. 1440) ⚭ Eve of Stein (d. 1485)	Nicholas VI of Hunolstein-Neumagen (d. 1453) ⚭ ? (?–?)	John IV de Boulay (d. 1468) ⚭ 1435; Elisabeth d'Autel (d. 1475)
Great-grandparents	Philip I of Waldeck-Waldeck (1445–1475) ⚭ 1464; Joanne of Nassau-Siegen (1444–1468)		William of Runkel (d. 1489) ⚭ 1454; Irmgard of Rollingen (d. 1514)		Gerlach II of Isenburg-Grenzau (d. 1500) ⚭ 1455; Hildegard of Sierck (d. 1490)		Henry of Hunolstein-Neumagen (d. 1486) ⚭ 1466; Elisabeth de Boulay (d. 1507)	
Grandparents	Henry VIII of Waldeck-Wildungen (1465–1513) ⚭ before 1492; Anastasia of Runkel (d. 1502/03)				Salentin VII of Isenburg-Grenzau (before 1470–1534) ⚭ Elisabeth of Hunolstein-Neumagen (c. 1475–1536/38)			
Parents	Philip IV of Waldeck-Wildungen (1493–1574) ⚭ 1554; Jutta of Isenburg-Grenzau (d. 1564)							

== Literature ==
- Dietrich, Reinhard (1996). Die Landesverfassung in dem Hanauischen. Hanauer Geschichtsblätter (in German). Vol. 34. Hanau. ISBN 3-9801933-6-5.
- Lübbecke, Fried (1951). Hanau. Stadt u. Grafschaft (in German). Köln: Verlag E.A. Seemann.
- Menk, Gerhard (1982). "Philipp Ludwig I. von Hanau-Münzenberg (1553–1580). Bildungsgeschichte und Politik eines Reichsgrafen in der zweiten Hälfte des 16. Jahrhunderts". Hessisches Jahrbuch für Landesgeschichte (in German). Vol. 32. pp. 127–163.
- Schmidt, Georg (1989). Der Wetterauer Grafenverein. Veröffentlichungen der Historischen Kommission für Hessen (in German). Vol. 52. Marburg. ISBN 3-7708-0928-9.
- Suchier, Reinhard (1894). "Genealogie des Hanauer Grafenhauses". Festschrift des Hanauer Geschichtsvereins zu seiner fünfzigjährigen Jubelfeier am 27. August 1894 (in German). Hanau: G. Heydt.
- Varnhagen, Johann Adolf Theodor Ludwig (1853). Grundlage der Waldeckischen Landes- und Regentengeschichte (in German). Vol. Zweiter Band. Arolsen: Verlag der Speyer'schen Buchhandlung.
- Zimmermann, Ernst J. (1978) [1903]. Hanau. Stadt und Land (in German) (3rd ed.). Hanau: Hans Peters Verlag. ISBN 3-87627-243-2.

== Sources ==
- Van der Aa, A.J. (1855). "Brederode (Joan Wolfert van)". Biographisch Woordenboek der Nederlanden, bevattende levensbeschrijvingen van zoodanige personen, die zich op eenigerlei wijze in ons vaderland hebben vermaard gemaakt (in Dutch). Vol. Tweede deel. Tweede stuk. Haarlem: J.J. van Brederode. pp. 1265–1268.
- Aßmann, Helmut & Menk, Friedhelm (1996). Auf den Spuren von Nassau und Oranien in Siegen (in German). Siegen: Gesellschaft für Stadtmarketing Siegen e.V.
- von Behr, Kamill (1854). Genealogie der in Europa regierenden Fürstenhäuser (in German). Leipzig: Verlag von Bernhard Tauchnitz.
- Blok, P.J. (1911). "Johan VII". In Molhuysen, P.C. & Blok, P.J. (eds.). Nieuw Nederlandsch Biografisch Woordenboek (in Dutch). Vol. Eerste deel. Leiden: A.W. Sijthoff. p. 1221.
- Blok, P.J. (1911). "Johan (Johann), de Jongere, graaf van Nassau-Siegen". In Molhuysen, P.C. & Blok, P.J. (eds.). Nieuw Nederlandsch Biografisch Woordenboek (in Dutch). Vol. Eerste deel. Leiden: A.W. Sijthoff. pp. 1221–1222.
- De Clercq, Carlo (1962). "Die katholischen Fürsten von Nassau-Siegen". Nassauische Annalen (in German). Vol. Band 73. Wiesbaden. pp. 129–152.
- Deconinck, J. & J. (1965). "Genealogie van de Heren van Ronse (De Families Nassau-Siegen en Mero-de-Westerloo)". Annalen. Geschied- en oudheidkundige kring van Ronse en het tenement van Inde (in Dutch). Ronse/Renaix. pp. 103–118.
- Dek, A.W.E. (1962). Graf Johann der Mittlere von Nassau-Siegen und seine 25 Kinder (in German). Rijswijk: Krips Repro.
- Dek, A.W.E. (1968). "De afstammelingen van Juliana van Stolberg tot aan het jaar van de Vrede van Münster". Spiegel der Historie. Maandblad voor de geschiedenis der Nederlanden (in Dutch). 1968 (7/8): 228–303.
- Dek, A.W.E. (1970). Genealogie van het Vorstenhuis Nassau (in Dutch). Zaltbommel: Europese Bibliotheek.
- von Ehrenkrook, Hans Friedrich; Förster, Karl & Marchtaler, Kurt Erhard (1928). Ahnenreihen aus allen deutschen Gauen. Beilage zum Archiv für Sippenforschung und allen verwandten Gebieten (in German). Görlitz: Verlag für Sippenforschung und Wappenkunde C.A. Starke.
- Glawischnig, Rolf (1974). "Johann VII.". Neue Deutsche Biographie (in German). Vol. Band 10. Berlin: Duncker & Humblot. p. 501. ISBN 3-428-00191-5.
- Glawischnig, Rolf (1974). "Johann VIII.". Neue Deutsche Biographie (in German). Vol. Band 10. Berlin: Duncker & Humblot. pp. 501–502. ISBN 3-428-00191-5.
- Haarmann, Torsten (2014). Das Haus Waldeck und Pyrmont. Mehr als 900 Jahre Gesamtgeschichte mit Stammfolge. Deutsche Fürstenhäuser (in German). Vol. Heft 35. Werl: Börde-Verlag. ISBN 978-3-981-4458-2-4.
- Heniger, J. (1999). "Genealogische tabellen". In Koenhein, A.J.M.; Brederoo, P.; Will, Chr.; Heniger, J.; Leeuwenberg, H.L.Ph. & Den Hertog, P.T. (eds.). Johan Wolfert van Brederode 1599-1655. Een Hollands edelman tussen Nassau en Oranje (in Dutch). Vianen & Zutphen: Historische Vereniging Het Land van Brederode & Uitgeversmaatschappij Walburg Pers. pp. 133–135. ISBN 90-5730-034-6.
- Hoffmeister, Jacob Christoph Carl (1883). Historisch-genealogisches Handbuch über alle Grafen und Fürsten von Waldeck und Pyrmont seit 1228 (in German). Cassel: Verlag Gustav Klaunig.
- Huberty, Michel; Giraud, Alain & Magdelaine, F. & B. (1976). l'Allemagne Dynastique (in French). Vol. Tome I: Hesse-Reuss-Saxe. Le Perreux: Alain Giraud. ISBN 2-901138-01-2.
- Huberty, Michel; Giraud, Alain & Magdelaine, F. & B. (1981). l'Allemagne Dynastique (in French). Vol. Tome III: Brunswick-Nassau-Schwarzbourg. Le Perreux: Alain Giraud. ISBN 2-901138-03-9.
- Huberty, Michel; Giraud, Alain & Magdelaine, F. & B. (1989). l'Allemagne Dynastique (in French). Vol. Tome V: Hohenzollern-Waldeck-Familles alliées A-B. Le Perreux-sur-Marne: Alain Giraud. ISBN 2-901138-05-5.
- Joachim, Ernst (1881). "Johann der Mittlere von Nassau-Siegen". Allgemeine Deutsche Biographie (in German). Vol. Band 14. Leipzig: Duncker & Humblot. pp. 265–266.
- Joachim, Ernst (1881). "Johann der Jüngere von Nassau-Siegen". Allgemeine Deutsche Biographie (in German). Vol. Band 14. Leipzig: Duncker & Humblot. pp. 266–268.
- Knetsch, Carl (1931). Das Haus Brabant. Genealogie der Herzoge von Brabant und der Landgrafen von Hessen (in German). Vol. II. Teil: Die Nachkommen Philipps des Grossmütigen. Darmstadt: Historischer Verein für das Großherzogtum Hessen.
- Koenhein, A.J.M. & Heniger, J. (1999). "Johan Wolfert van Brederode 1599–1655 – 'In Opbloey neergetoghen'". In Koenhein, A.J.M.; Brederoo, P.; Will, Chr.; Heniger, J.; Leeuwenberg, H.L.Ph. & Den Hertog, P.T. (eds.). Johan Wolfert van Brederode 1599-1655. Een Hollands edelman tussen Nassau en Oranje (in Dutch). Vianen & Zutphen: Historische Vereniging Het Land van Brederode & Uitgeversmaatschappij Walburg Pers. pp. 9–46. ISBN 90-5730-034-6.
- De Ligne née Cossé-Brissac, Princesse (1936). Claire Marie de Nassau, Princesse de Ligne (in French). Brussel: l'Édition universelle.
- Lück, Alfred (1981) [1967]. Siegerland und Nederland (in German) (2nd ed.). Siegen: Siegerländer Heimatverein e.V.
- Lück, Alfred & Wunderlich, Hermann (1956) [1952]. Die Fürstengruft zu Siegen (in German). Siegen: Verkehrsverein Siegen e.V.
- Menk, Friedhelm (1971). Quellen zur Geschichte des Siegerlandes im niederländischen königlichen Hausarchiv (in German). Siegen: Stadt Siegen & Forschungsstelle Siegerland.
- Menk, Friedhelm (1994). "Die nassauischen Begräbnisstätten in der ev. Stadtkirche zu Dillenburg". In Pletz-Krehahn, Hans-Jürgen (ed.). 650 Jahre Stadt Dillenburg. Ein Text- und Bildband zum Stadtrechtsjubiläum der Oranierstadt (in German). Dillenburg: Verlag E. Weidenbach GmbH + Co. KG. pp. 119–125.
- Menk, Friedhelm (2004). "Die Fürstengruft zu Siegen und die darin von 1669 bis 1781 erfolgten Beisetzungen". In Burwitz, Ludwig; Menk, Friedhelm; Opfermann, Ulrich Friedrich; Pfau, Dieter & Plaum, Bernd D. (eds.). Siegener Beiträge. Jahrbuch für regionale Geschichte (in German). Vol. 9. Siegen: Geschichtswerkstatt Siegen – Arbeitskreis für Regionalgeschichte e.V. pp. 183–202. ISSN 1431-6684.
- Muller, P.L. (1898). "Wilhelm (Graf von Nassau-Siegen und Dillenburg)". Allgemeine Deutsche Biographie (in German). Vol. Band 43. Leipzig: Duncker & Humblot. p. 133.
- Graf von Oeynhausen, Julius & Grotefend, H. (1889). Geschichte des Geslechts von Oeynhausen. Aus gedruckten und ungedruckten Quellen (in German). Vol. Dritter Theil: Biographische Bearbeitung. Frankfurt am Main: Wilhelm Rommel.
- Pletz-Krehahn, Hans-Jürgen (1994). "Beisetzungen in den 15 Grabstellen der Dillenburger Nassauergruft". In Pletz-Krehahn, Hans-Jürgen (ed.). 650 Jahre Stadt Dillenburg. Ein Text- und Bildband zum Stadtrechtsjubiläum der Oranierstadt (in German). Dillenburg: Verlag E. Weidenbach GmbH + Co. KG. pp. 115–118.
- Romein, J.M. (1937). "Brederode, Joan Wolfert van". In Molhuysen, P.C. & Kossmann, F.K.H. (eds.). Nieuw Nederlandsch Biografisch Woordenboek (in Dutch). Vol. Tiende deel. Leiden: A.W. Sijthoff. pp. 125–126.
- Textor von Haiger, Johann (1617). Nassauische Chronik. In welcher des vralt, hochlöblich, vnd weitberühmten Stamms vom Hause Naßaw, Printzen vnd Graven Genealogi oder Stammbaum: deren geburt, leben, heurath, kinder, zu Friden- vnd Kriegszeiten verzichtete sachen und thaten, absterben, und sonst denckwürdige Geschichten. Sampt einer kurtzen general Nassoviae und special Beschreibung der Graf- und Herschaften Naßaw-Catzenelnbogen, etc (in German). Herborn: Christoph Raab.
- Vorsterman van Oyen, A.A. (1882). Het vorstenhuis Oranje-Nassau. Van de vroegste tijden tot heden (in Dutch). Leiden & Utrecht: A.W. Sijthoff & J.L. Beijers.

Magdalene of Waldeck House of Waldeck Born: 1558 Died: 9 September 1599
Regnal titles
Vacant Title last held by Countess Palatine Helena of Simmern	Countess Consort of Hanau-Münzenberg; 5 February 1576 – 4 February 1580	Vacant Title next held by Countess Catharina Belgica of Nassau
